= Burlington-Edison High School =

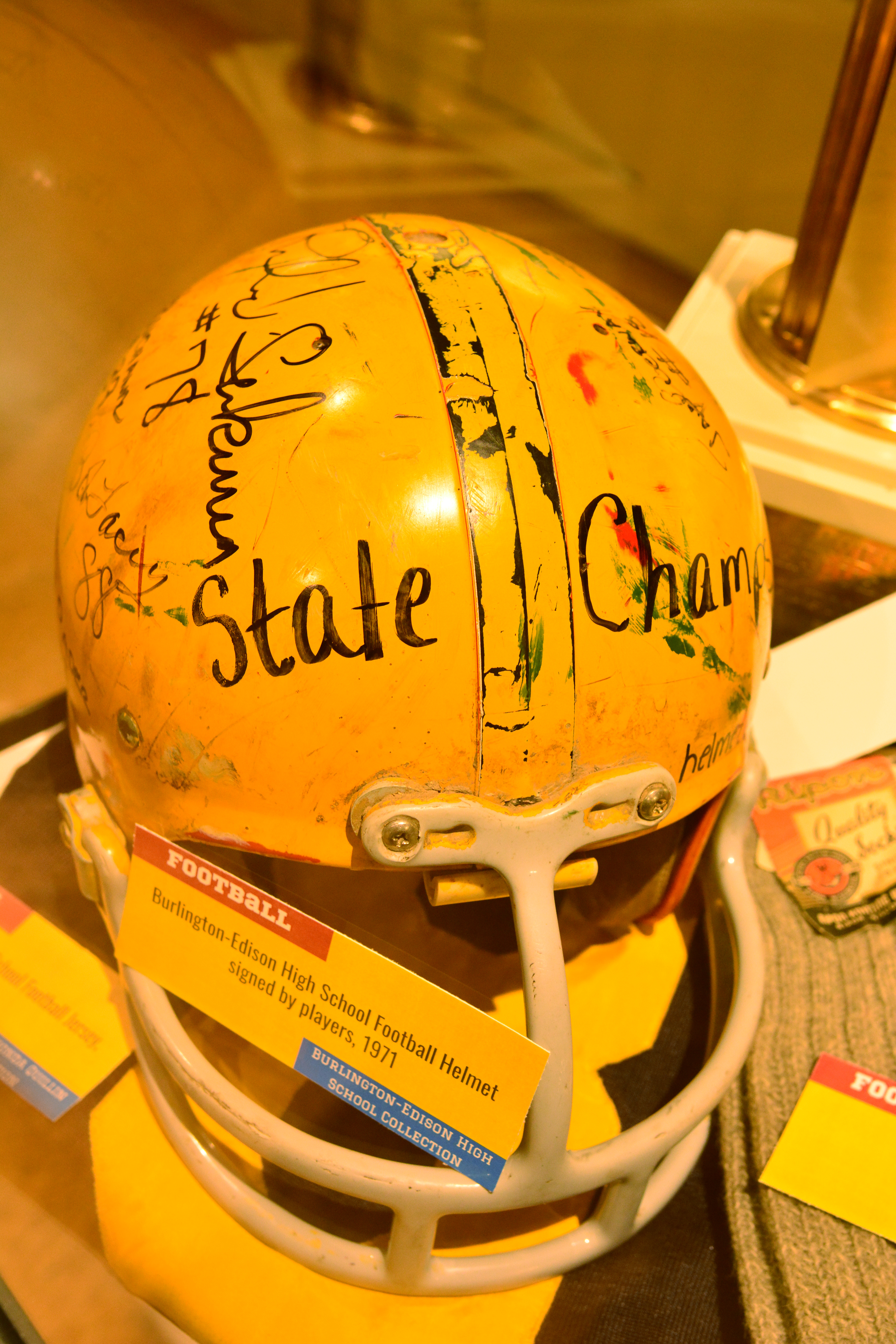
- Burlington-Edison High School football helmet signed by players

Location
- 301 N. Burlington Blvd; Burlington, Washington 98233; United States; 48°28′40″N 122°20′12″W

Information
- Type: Public high school
- Established: 1943 (as Burlington-Edison)
- School district: Burlington-Edison School District
- CEEB code: 480130
- NCES School ID: 530078000155
- Principal: Alejandro Vergara
- Teaching staff: 55.52 (FTE)
- Grades: 9 to 12
- Enrollment: 1,091 (2023-2024)
- Student to teacher ratio: 19.65
- Colors: Blue & gold
- Mascot: Tigers
- Rivals: Mount Vernon, Sedro-Woolley and Anacortes
- Yearbook: Tinas Coma
- Website: www.be.wednet.edu/o/behs

Burlington-Edison High School (B-EHS) is a public high school in Burlington, Washington, United States. It serves students in grades 9–12 in the Burlington-Edison School District, including the communities of Burlington, Bow, Edison, and Alger. The current principal is Alejandro Vergara. The mascot is the Tiger, and the school colors are blue and gold.

In 1943, Burlington High School combined with Edison High school to form Burlington-Edison High School. The Edison High School mascot was the Sparkplug and their colors were red and white. Burlington-Edison High School kept the Tiger mascot when the schools combined, as well as their blue and gold colors. Burlington-Edison's main rival is Mount Vernon High School.

== Demographics ==
In the 2013-2014 school year, the total student population was 1,099. 64.7% of those students were White, 29.9% were Hispanic, 2.3% were Asian, 0.7% were African American, and 1.3% were American Indian or Native Alaskan. As of October 2013, 41.2% qualified for free or reduced lunches.

== Intelligent design controversy ==
In 1997 it became known to the public that longtime biology teacher Roger DeHart had been teaching intelligent design in his curriculum through excerpts of Of Pandas and People and Inherit the Wind. This brought forth national attention and controversy. From 1986 to 1997, DeHart had subtly posed the intelligent design theory in the classroom. After parents of one of his students notified the American Civil Liberties Union, the group threatened to sue the Burlington-Edison School District if DeHart did not stop teaching intelligent design. The event sparked a large debate, and support groups for both sides were formed. DeHart was later reassigned to earth sciences, and in 2001 he resigned and took a teaching job at Marysville-Pilchuck High School. He taught there for one year before transferring to a Christian school in California.

== NJROTC ==
The Naval JROTC Unit at Burlington-Edison, also known as the "Tiger Company" teaches leadership, followership, and basic skills needed to succeed in the world today. The unit consists of 90-100 students on average.

The class also offers many teams, including Color Guard, Drill Teams, Physical Strength, and Air Rifle teams. Each team competes monthly at a meet hosted by different local JROTC schools. Students on teams are required to show up each morning at 6:20 for practice. Drill teams practice on Monday, Tuesday, Thursday, and Friday; Color Guard practices on Wednesday.

=== Field trips ===
As a part of the curriculum, the freshman class, NS1, takes a field trip to Naval Air Station Whidbey Island and gets a private tour of the operations that take place there. The sophomore/junior class, NS2, takes a field trip to Bangor Sub Base on the Olympic Peninsula. In the past, the senior class, NS3, has taken a field trip aboard a naval destroyer for a day, but due to terror threats and security, these have been discontinued.

== Athletics ==
=== Kirkby Field ===
Burlington-Edison High School's stadium was named in November 1992 after the legendary Burlington-Edison athlete Roland Kirkby. It is the home to the Tiger Football team. During the 1970s and 1980s they experienced great success, winning state championships in 1971, 1977 and 1986 under Coach Glenn Rickert.

=== Hall of Fame ===
Starting in the winter of 2005, Burlington-Edison High School has honored outstanding former athletes. Every winter at a home basketball game, honorees are inducted. The Hall of Fame is displayed in the foyer of the main gym.

=== Volleyball ===
The girls' volleyball program is one of the most successful programs in the entire state. Coach Tawnya Brewer has taken this program to the state tournament for 12 years in a row, and has won the 2A State Championship four times: 2011, 2013, 2015, and 2017. The volleyball program has placed in the top 8 in the state in 11 out of the last 12 years. Coach Brewer's teams have won 11 conference / league championships, in 1996, 2000, 2001, 2006, 2007, 2009, 2010, 2011, 2013, 2015, and 2017. Coach Brewer's teams have won nine district championships, in 2000, 2001, 2006, 2007, 2008, 2011, 2012, 2013, and 2017. Coach Brewer's teams have won one academic state championship, in 1996. Coach Brewer's teams have won 12 state trophies: four state championships; one 4th-place finish in 2010; four 5th-place trophies in 2000, 2006, 2014, and 2016; one 6th-place trophy in 2012; and two seventh-place trophies in 2007 and 2008. Coach Christie Peterson won two state volleyball championships, in 1982 and 1983.

=== Soccer ===
The girls' soccer program went to the state tournament in 2005 and 2006. In 2007, they had a final record of 19-4, claiming the Northwest League Championship and 2nd place in districts, losing to Archbishop Murphy High School. That same season, the girls' soccer team placed second in the state, losing 2-1 to Fife High School in the championship game.

=== Golf ===
The golf program earned state championships in 1975, 1979, 1990, 1991, 1992, 1993, 1994, and 1997. They finished second in 1983, and their 1988 and 1989 second-place finishes were just a preview for the four straight state titles to follow and five in eight years. The girls' golf team won state titles in 1989 and 1990 in the 3A division. They also finished second in 1993, 1995, 1999, and 2000. The golf program has also had many individual state champions.

=== Cross Country ===
The cross country team under coach Sue Wright has seen much success over the past half-decade. In 2004, they traveled to state and placed 5th. The following year they returned to state and placed 3rd. In 2006, the Tigers finished their season with only one loss. They won the league and district meets and traveled again to state, earning first place. The following year, the team returned to state, again taking first. In 2008, they made the state tournament, but lost the first-place trophy to rival Sehome, finishing second. In 2009, the team returned to state once more, taking first for the third time in four years. In 2012, the girls' team qualified for state for the first time in school history and placed 5th. The girls' team also placed 5th in 2013, while Rayn Joy Norton became the Class 2A State Champion. The boys' team were Academic State Champions in 2013.

=== Football ===
The Tiger football team won state titles in 1971, 1977 and 1986, led by coach Glenn Rickert. The Tigers have found recent success in the past decade under head coach Bruce Shearer, who retired after the 2011 season. They have made the state playoffs in six straight years from 2005 and present, including a state championship run against the Prosser Mustangs in 2007. The football game between the Burlington-Edison Tigers and the Mount Vernon Bulldogs, known as "Battle of the Bridge", is played every year either at Kirkby Field or Bulldog Stadium.

== Notable alumni ==
- Danielle Fisher - first female and, at the time, youngest person to climb the Seven Summits (the tallest peaks on each continent), class of 2003
- Edward R. Murrow - iconic radio and television broadcaster and journalist (Edison High School)
- Mary Mapes - former 60 Minutes producer, subject of 2015 film Truth starring Cate Blanchett as Mapes
- Mel Hein - NFL Hall of Fame and only offensive lineman to ever win NFL Most Valuable Player award; one of only two players to have his number retired at Washington State University
- Will Watson - baseball player in the New York Mets organization
