= Çetin =

- Gender: Male

Origin
- Language: Turkish
- Meaning: Tough, Robust, Strong, Hard, Arduous

Other names
- Related names: Cetinkaya, Cetina

Çetin (Turkish pronunciation: [tʃeˈtin]) is a Turkish masculine given name. In Turkish, "Çetin" means "Tough", "Robust", "Strong", "Hard", and/or "Arduous"

== People ==
=== Given name ===
- Çetin Alp (1947–2004), Turkish pop music singer
- Çetin Altan (1927–2015), Turkish writer, journalist, and former member of parliament
- Çetin Emeç, prominent Turkish journalist and columnist, who was assassinated
- Çetin Güngör, Turkish footballer
- Çetin İnanç, Turkish film director
- Çetin Mandacı, Greek politician
- Çetin Özek, Turkish jurist, author and journalist
- Çetin Tekindor, Turkish actor
- Çetin Topçuoğlu, former Turkish taekwondo athlete, who died in the Gaza flotilla raid

=== Surname ===
- Arcan Cetin, American perpetrator of the Cascade Mall shooting
- Bülent Çetin (born 1985), Turkish amputee football player
- Cansu Çetin (born 1993), Turkish volleyball player
- Edanur Çetin (born 2000), Turkish female handball player
- Hikmet Çetin, Turkish politician
- Oğuz Çetin, Turkish football player
- Recep Çetin, Turkish footballer
- Serhat Çetin, Turkish basketball player
- Servet Çetin, Turkish footballer
- Sevil Rojbin Çetin, Turkish politician
- Sinan Çetin, Turkish actor, film director, and producer
- Yavuz Çetin, Turkish rock music artist
