= 2016 Cascade Mall shooting =

Mass shooting in Washington, U.S.

- Closed-circuit television stills of the perpetrator (Arcan Cetin)

- 2016 Cascade Mall shooting (Washington (state)) 2016 Cascade Mall shooting (the United States)
- Location: 48.462213°N 122.337782°W; Cascade Mall, Burlington, Washington, U.S.
- Date: September 23, 2016; 10 years ago 6:52 p.m. (PDT)
- Attack type: Mass shooting, mass murder
- Weapon: .22 caliber Ruger 10/22 semi-automatic rifle
- Deaths: 5
- Perpetrator: Arcan Cetin

On September 23, 2016, a mass shooting occurred at Cascade Mall in Burlington, Washington, United States. Five people were killed in the incident. The gunman was identified as Arcan Cetin, a 20-year-old who emigrated from Turkey as a child with his family. He was arrested the following day in Oak Harbor, Washington, his hometown. On September 26, he confessed to committing the shooting. On April 16, 2017, Cetin killed himself via hanging in his jail cell.

== Killings ==
On September 23, 2016, Cetin bought tickets to an evening showing of the movie Snowden at Cascade Mall in Burlington, Washington. He propped open the theater's exit door with his cell phone and left the theater, an action reminiscent of how the 2012 Aurora, Colorado shooting was carried out. However, a theater associate found the phone and turned it in to a theater kiosk, where Cetin subsequently retrieved it. Shortly before 7:00 p.m. PDT on the same day, Cetin walked into a Macy's store at Cascade Mall with a stolen Ruger 10/22 rifle and opened fire, killing a teenage girl, three women, and one man, the latter of whom died the next day at a Seattle hospital from three gunshot wounds, including one to the head.

Video footage of the shooting, released on October 28, showed the gunman randomly targeting his victims. He first killed a teenage girl near some clothing racks, then approached a cosmetics counter, where he killed one man and three women. All of the victims were shot at close range, while others present in the store escaped unharmed because of their distance from the shooter. Afterwards, the gunman abandoned his weapon and fled the scene in a blue four-door vehicle.

The FBI and ATF provided assistance to the Burlington police and Washington state police in investigating the shooting.

The shooting followed a number of widely publicized attacks on shopping centers, and came a week after a mass stabbing at the Crossroads Center shopping mall in St. Cloud, Minnesota.

=== Victims ===
Five people were killed in the shooting. They were Sarai Lara (16), a sophomore at Mount Vernon High School and cancer survivor; Chuck Eagan (61), a Boeing maintenance worker from Lake Stevens; Belinda Galde (64), a probation officer with the Snohomish County District Court; Beatrice Dotson (95), Galde's mother; and Shayla Martin (52), a make-up artist at Macy's.

== Legal proceedings ==
Cetin was charged with "premeditated intent" on five counts of aggravated murder, a charge that was upgraded from the initial charge of first-degree premeditated murder. The charge of aggravated murder is punishable by a sentence of life without parole, or, at the time of the shooting, by the death penalty.

=== Perpetrator ===
Arcan Cetin (pronounced [aɾˈdʒan tʃeˈtin], August 20, 1996 – April 16, 2017) was born in Adana, Turkey. He immigrated to the United States as a child after his mother married a U.S. citizen. Authorities initially identified him as a "permanent resident" until further investigation found that he was a naturalized American citizen. He graduated from Oak Harbor High School in 2015 and worked as a bagger at the Commissary in Naval Air Station Whidbey Island.

Cetin was arrested without incident on the evening of September 24 while he was walking on Oak Harbor Road at Northeast Seventh Avenue in Oak Harbor, Washington. Two days later, he confessed to the shooting. Cetin was charged with five counts of aggravated murder. He was being evaluated for mental health concerns.

Cetin had prior arrests; he was a defendant in seven cases in Island County District Court from 2013 to 2015 and was arrested in July 2015 on charges of assault in the fourth degree. Cetin was ordered to undergo mental health counseling, which he completed in March 2016. The court also imposed an order for him not to take drugs or drink alcohol. As of August 25, 2016, no breach of the court order against Cetin had been identified.

On April 17, 2017, the media reported that Cetin had hanged himself the previous night in the Snohomish County Jail. An investigation by the Snohomish County Sheriff's Office concluded that Cetin had killed himself.

=== Possible motive ===
Police have not determined a motive for the shooting. Before Cetin's arrest, authorities stated they had no reason to believe the incident was related to terrorism. Cetin told authorities that he was interested in the activities of ISIS, but when asked if the terrorist group had inspired his actions he replied, "I can't answer that." On social media, Cetin posted photos of serial killer Ted Bundy and Islamic State leader Abu Bakr al-Baghdadi. Cetin had a YouTube channel on which he posted gameplay clips from several video games including Call of Duty: Black Ops II and The Elder Scrolls V: Skyrim, but never expressed intent to commit acts of violence in real life.

On September 25, 2016, reports said that Cetin may have been motivated by the break-up of a relationship with a worker from the Macy's store he targeted, but at the time the ex-girlfriend had not worked there in months and lived in another county. Authorities alleged that Cetin called out women's names as he killed his victims during the shooting.

=== Voting ===
Initial reporting had revealed that Cetin had completed the legal steps to become a voter and had voted three times despite apparently not being a United States citizen. According to Washington's Secretary of State Kim Wyman, his voting "shined a light in a hole in the voter registration system" as county auditors were not allowed to check the citizenship of voters; Wyman said she would submit a package to the legislature addressing this. It was later determined that Cetin was a naturalized US citizen and therefore permitted to vote.

== See also ==
- 2008 Skagit County shootings
- Tacoma Mall shooting
