= Turks of Western Thrace =

Turkish ethnic minority in Greece

Turks of Western Thrace Batı Trakya Türkleri Τούρκοι της Δυτικής Θράκης
Total population
- 100,000–210,000

Regions with significant populations
- Western Thrace

Languages
- Turkish, Greek

Religion
- mostly Sunni Islam, minority Alevism

Related ethnic groups
- Other Turks, Pomaks, Muslim Roma

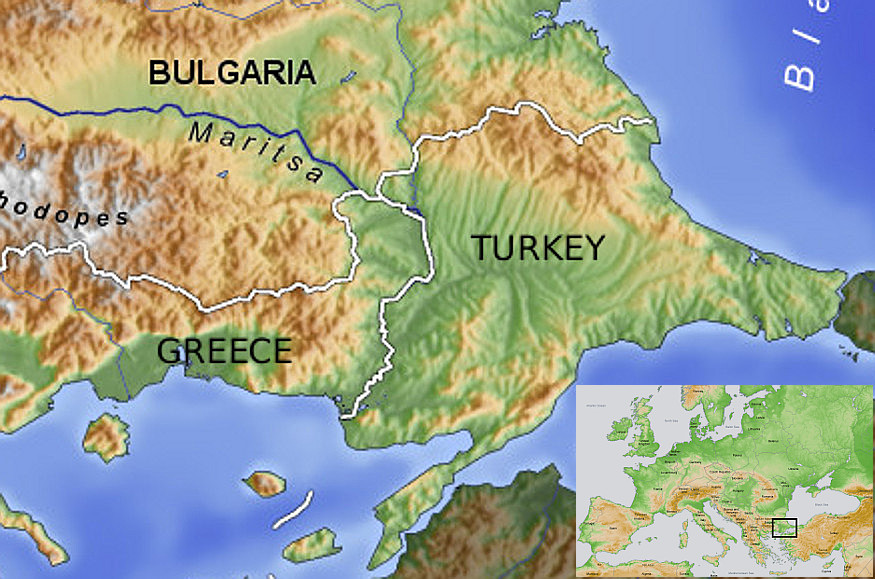
The region of Thrace. West Thrace

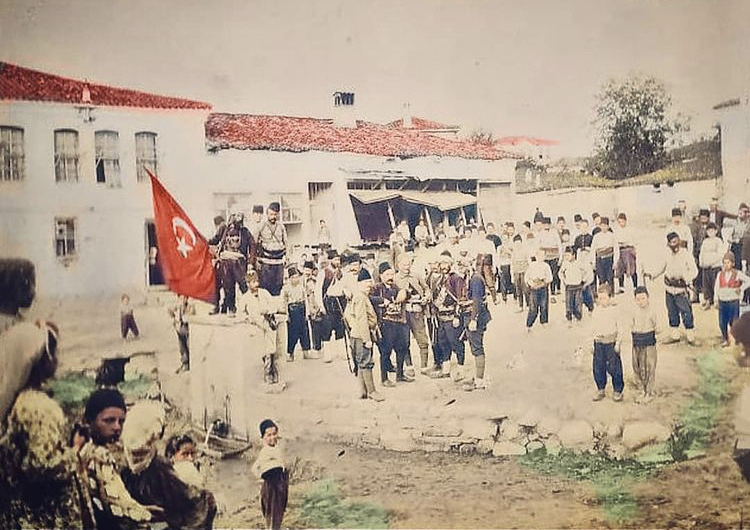
West Thrace Republic voluntary Turkish soldiers in Kardzali Streets, 1913

Turks of Western Thrace (Turkish: Batı Trakya Türkleri; Greek: Τούρκοι της Δυτικής Θράκης, romanized: Toúrkoi tis Dytikís Thrákis) are ethnic Turks who live in Western Thrace, in the province of East Macedonia and Thrace in Northern Greece.

According to the Greek census of 1991, there were approximately 50,000 of Turkish origin in Western Thrace, out of the approximately 98,000 strong Muslim minority of Greece. Other sources estimate the size of the Muslim community between 90,000 and 120,000. Their community of Western Thrace is not to be confused with Pomaks nor with Muslim Roma people of the same region, counting 35% and 15% of the Muslim minority respectively.

Due to the multiethnic character of the Muslim minority of Greece, which includes Greek Muslims, Turks, Pomaks and Roma Muslims, the Government of Greece does not refer to it by a specific ethnic background, nor does recognize any of these ethnicities, including the Turks, as separate ethnic minority in Western Thrace, instead referring to the whole Muslim minority on religious grounds, as the "Muslim Minority of Western Thrace" or "Greek Muslims". This is in accordance with the Treaty of Lausanne to which Greece, along with Turkey, is a signature member. The Lausanne Treaty, along with the Greek Constitution and the Charter of Fundamental Rights of the European Union, enshrines the fundamental rights of the Turks and other ethnic groups of East Macedonia and Thrace and the obligations towards them.

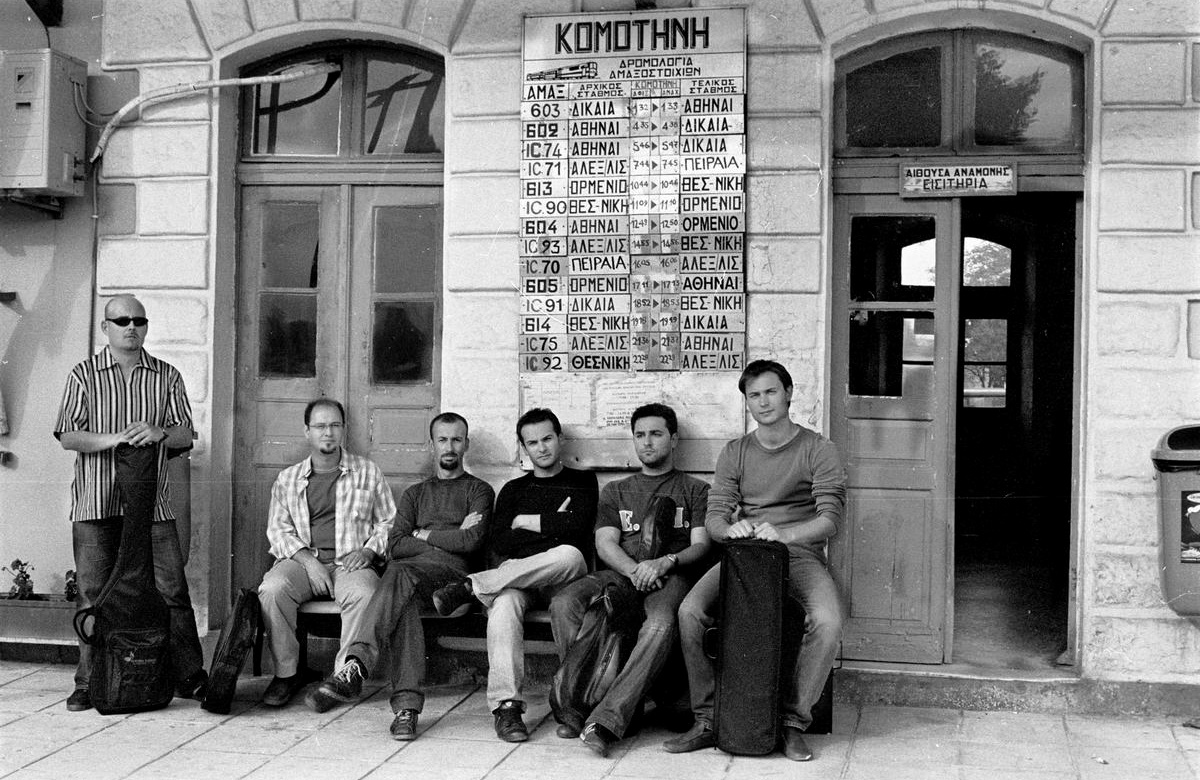
Western Thracian Turkish band Balkanatolia (2006)

== History ==
Parts of Western Thrace were overrun by the expanding Ottoman Empire in 1354 and remained in Ottoman control until 1913. During this time, the Turkish community grew to outnumber the Greek community four to one and owned close to 84% of the land. By August 31, 1913, the Turks of Western Thrace had formed the first 'Turkish republic', the Provisional Government of Western Thrace. However, it was taken over by the Kingdom of Bulgaria on October 25, 1913, which had been victorious in the First Balkan War. France occupied the area at the end of the First World War, following the defeat of Bulgaria, and it passed into Greek hands under the Treaty of Sèvres in August 1920. Under a protocol of the same year, the Turks of Western Thrace were exempted from the 1922–1923 exchange of populations agreement between Greece and Turkey and were granted rights within the framework of the Lausanne Treaty. However, since 1923, between 300,000 and 400,000 Turks have left Western Thrace most of which have immigrated to Turkey. The actual Ottoman-era Greek Muslims of Macedonia had been included among those 'Turks' expatriated to Turkey in 1924. including the Vallahades. In contrast, the Western Thrace Turks are completely distinct from those referred to as Greek Muslims and were exempt from the terms of the population exchange.

A number of estimates and censuses during the 1912–1920 period gave the following results about the ethnic distribution of the area that would become known as Western Thrace:

General Distribution of Population in Western Thrace (1912–1920)
Census/Estimate	Muslims	Pomaks	Bulgarians	Greeks	Others	Total
1912 estimate	120,000	–	40,000	60,000	4,000	224,000
1919 Bulgarian	79,539	17,369	87,941	28,647	10,922	224,418
1919 Bulgarian	77,726	20,309	81,457	32,553	8,435	220,480
1920 French	74,730	11,848	54,092	56,114	7,906	204,690
1920 Greek	93,273	–	25,677	74,416	6,038	201,404

The Pomak population depending on the source was sometimes counted together with the Turks according to the Ottoman system of classifying people depending on religion, while in other occasions was specified separately. On the other hand, according to the Bulgarian view, they are considered "Bulgarian Muslims" and an integral part of the Bulgarian nation.

According to the Turkish thesis, as it was presented at Lausanne Peace Conference (1920), the general distribution of population in Western Thrace was as follows:

Turkish thesis on the General Distribution of Population in Western Thrace in 1920 (before the population exchange)
Cities	Turks	Greeks	Bulgarians	Jews	Armenians	Total
Komotini	59,967 (74.8%)	8,834 (11%)	9,997 (12.5%)	1,007 (1.3%)	360 (0.4%)	80,165 (100%)
Alexandroupolis	11,744 (42.7%)	4,800 (17.5%)	10,227 (37.2%)	253 (0.9%)	449 (1.6%)	27,473 (100%)
Soufli	14,736 (46.4%)	11,542 (36.3%)	5,490 (17.3%)	–	–	31,768 (100%)
Xanthi	42,671 (81.7%)	8,728 (16.7%)	522 (1%)	220 (0.4%)	114 (0.2%)	52,255 (100%)
Total	129,120 (67.4%)	33,910 (17.7%)	26,266 (13.7%)	1,480 (0.8%)	923 (0.5%)	191,699 (100%)

During Ottoman rule before 1912, Greeks constituted a minority in the region of Western Thrace. After the Balkan Wars and World War I the demography of the region was changed. While groups such as the Turks and Bulgarians decreased, the Greek population increased by the resettlement of ten thousands of Greek refugees from other areas of the Ottoman Empire, after the flight of the Greek refugees from Asia Minor, as a result of the Greco-Turkish War (1919-1922), the Greek genocide and the subsequent population exchange between Greece and Turkey. Of all Greek Asia Minor refugees (around 1.2 million), 8% of them were resettled in Western Thrace. The Greek government's reason to settle the refugees in this region was to strengthen the Greek presence in the newly acquired provinces and the homogenization of the population. The Greek government especially resettled the refugees in Komotini, Xanthi and Sapes regions where the majority of Muslim Turks lived.

General Distribution of Population in Western Thrace in 1923, presented by the Greek delegation in Laussane (after the relocation of Asia Minor refugees)
Districts	Total	Total Greeks	Local Greeks	Relocated Greek refugees	Turks	Bulgarians	Jews	Armenians
Komotini	104,108	45,516	11,386	33,770	50,081	6,609	1,112	1,183
Alexandroupolis	38,553	26,856	9,228	17,518	2,705	9,102	–
Soufli	32,299	25,758	11,517	14,211	5,454	1,117	–	–
Xanthi	64,744	36,859	18,249	18,613	27,882	–	–
Didymoteicho	34,621	31,408	21,759	9,649	3,213	–	–	–
Orestiada	39,386	33,764	22,087	11,677	6,072	–	–	–
Total	314,235	199,664 (63.5%)	94,226 (30.0%)	105,438 (33.6%)	95,407 (30.4%)	16,828 (5.4%)	1,112 (0.4%)	1,183 (0.4%)

== Demographics ==
The Turkish community has a strong presence in the Komotini (Turkish: Gümülcine) and Xanthi (Turkish: İskeçe) departments of East Macedonia and Thrace, while it is scarcely present in the Evros prefecture, the closest to the international boundary with Turkey. According to estimates, Muslims as a whole, represented 36–38% of the Rhodopi Department population, 12–24% in the Xanthi Department and less than 5% in the Evros Department.

== Culture ==
=== Language ===
According to Ethnologue, in 1976 the Turkish language was spoken by 128,000 people in Greece, the majority of whom are located in the Western Thrace portion of the province of East Macedonia and Thrace. However, the Greek language is also widely used.

The Muslims of Western Thrace between 1919 and 1995
Census/ statistics	Total	Turks	Pomaks	Roma	Others
Bulgarian 1919 (A)	96,908	79,539	17,369	–	–
Bulgarian 1919 (B)	98.035	77,726	20,309	–	–
French 1920	86,578	74,730	11,848	–	–
Greek 1920 3rd version	100,491	93,522	6,969	–	–
Greek official 1928	102,621	84,585	16,740	<1,023	?
Greek official 1951	105,092	85,945	18,664	303	180
Turkish MFA (1995)	150,000	?	?	?	?
Greek MFA (1995)	120,000	~60,000	~42,000	~18,000	-

== Obligations of the Treaty of Lausanne ==
Article 37 through 45 of the Lausanne Treaty set forth the obligations of the Greek and Turkish governments to protect the Turkish and Greek minorities in their territories. Each country agreed to provide the following:

- Protection of life and liberty without regard to birth, nationality, language, race or religion
- Free exercise of religion
- Freedom of movement and of emigration
- Equality before the law
- The same civil and political rights enjoyed by the majority
- Free use of language in private, in commerce, in religion, the press and publications, at public meetings and in the courts
- The right to establish and control charitable, religious and social institutions and schools
- Primary schools in which instruction is given in both languages
- Full protection for religious establishments and pious foundation

The Lausanne Treaty defined the rights of the Muslim communities in Western Thrace, on the basis of religion, not ethnicity, as well as maintained a balance between the minority communities of both countries (Turks in Greece and Greeks in Turkey) on reciprocal obligations toward each of those minorities. The Treaty contained specific obligations for their cultural and religious rights. These have been largely respected, in contrast to measures taken by successive Turkish governments against the Greek minority in Turkey (like forced labor battalions, the Istanbul pogrom and Varlik Vergisi), a minority that is nearly eliminated today (from 70,000 in 1923 to 3,000 in 2000).

== Politics ==
=== Members of the Greek Parliament ===
In 1990 a new electoral law was enacted in Greece, which set a threshold of at least 3% of the nationwide vote for a party to be represented in the parliament. Consequently, independent Turkish MPs were barred from election at the 1993 elections. Since then the Turkish minority in the Hellenic Parliament has been represented by Turkish deputies belonging to nationwide political parties, and the Party of Friendship, Equality and Peace, which succeeded the Independent Muslim List in 1991, practically disappeared from the electoral scene.

Turkish MPs from Rhodopi and Xanthi
election	elected Turkish MPs
1989 (June)	Sadik Achmet (Independent Muslim List)
1989 (November)	Ismail Molla (Independent Muslim List)
1990	Sadik Achmet, Achmet Faikoglou (Independent Muslim List)
1993	none
1996	Moustafa Moustafa (Synaspismós), Galip Galip (PASOK, architect), Birol Akifoglou (ND)
2000	Galip Galip (PASOK), Mechmet Achmet (PASOK; Mechmet Achmet, already elected in 1981, was not directly elected in 2000, but he acted so that the elected MP, Hrissa Manolia, was forced to abandon her seat because she had not relinquished her other political mandate at the local level)
2004	Ilchan Achmet (New Democracy, lawyer)
2007	Tsetin Mantatzi (PASOK), Achmet Chatziosman (PASOK)
2009	Tsetin Mantatzi (PASOK), Achmet Chatziosman (PASOK)
2012	Aichan Kara Giousouf (Syriza, dentist), Chousein Zeimpek (Syriza, pharmacist), Achmet Chatziosman (PASOK)
2015	Rhodopi: Moustafa Moustafa, Aichan Kara Giousouf (Syriza) . Xanthi: Chousein Zeimpek (Syriza)

=== Greek legislative election, 2009 ===
There are presently two Turkish MPs from the Western Thrace portion of East Macedonia and Thrace, both of whom are affiliated to the Panhellenic Socialist Movement: Tsetin Mantatzi (Xanthi) and Achmet Chatziosman (Rhodope), former president (1999–2007) of the Party of Friendship, Equality and Peace created by former (1989) MP Sadik Achmet in 1991.

At least 14 candidates from the Turkish minority have been nominated, mainly in Rhodope and Xanthi.

For New Democracy, former MP (2004–2007) Ilchan Achmet and Achmet Achmet are candidates in Rhodope, and in Xanthi Aisel Zeimpek and Achmet Mpountour. Zeimpek had lost her Greek citizenship under Article 19 of the Greek Citizenship Code, which allowed of its revocation for non-ethnic Greeks who left the country. After a lengthy legal battle, she finally won her case with a second appeal before the European Court of Human Rights and re-secured her Greek citizenship in 2001.

For PASOK, Tsetin Mantatzi and Seval Osmanoglou are among the 5 candidates in Xanthi, Rintvan Kotzamoumin and Achmet Chatziosman among the 5 in Rhodope.

For the KKE (which presently has no MP in Xanthi or Rhodope), Faik Faik in Rhodope and Chasan Efendi in Xanthi.

For SYRIZA (which presently has no MP in Xanthi or Rhodope), Chasan Malkots and Chousein Zeimpek are candidates in Xanthi, and in Rhodope Dr. Moustafa Moustafa (former MP) and Tzelalentin Giourtsou.

=== European Parliament Elections ===
Turkish minority's Party of Friendship, Equality and Peace emerged as the first party in Xanthi and Rhodope in 2019 European Parliament elections.

In 2014 and 2019 European Parliament election in Greece, Party of Friendship, Equality and Peace (DEB) has emerged as the first party in Xanthi and Rhodope constituencies, under Moustafa Ali Tsavous, and most currently under Tsidem Asafoglou, respectively. In 2019 elections, DEB received 38% of the votes in Xanthi regional unit and 25.24% of the votes in Rhodope regional unit. DEB also received 1.30% of the votes in Evros regional unit. While in the overall region of Eastern Macedonia and Thrace, the party came in as the 3rd biggest party after top 2 national parties New Democracy and Syriza.

== Human rights issues ==
=== Citizenship ===
According to the former Article 19 of the 1955 Citizenship Law (No. 3370), a person of non-Greek ethnic origin leaving Greece without the intention of returning may be declared as having lost Greek nationality. According to the Greek government, between 1955 and 1998, approximately 60,000 Greek Muslim individuals, predominantly Turkish, were deprived of their citizenship under Article 19. Of these 60,000, approximately 7,182 lost their citizenship between 1981 and 1997. The application of this law to the Turks of Western Thrace was a retaliatory measure in response to the devastating state-sponsored pogrom which targeted the Greeks of Istanbul in September 1955. The pogrom precipitated an exodus of ethnic Greeks from Turkey. Article 19 was repealed in 1998, though not retroactively.

=== Ethnic identity ===
Since the Treaty of Lausanne used the criterion of religion to refer to the ethnic communities, the Greek Government has usually insisted that the basis of identification of a minority is religious and not ethnic (or national). Successive Greek Government policies refused to acknowledge the existence of an ethnic Turkish community in Northern Greece, and insisted on referring to Western Thrace Turks as Greek Muslims, suggesting that they were not of ethnic Turkish origin but were the descendants of Ottoman-era Greek converts to Islam like the Vallahades and other Greek Muslims of Greek Macedonia. This policy was introduced immediately after the unilateral declaration of independence of the Turkish Republic of Northern Cyprus in 1983 on lands that once had an 82% Greek majority before becoming refugees during the Turkish invasion in 1974. The Greek government declared that it was a measure to avert the possibility of the Greek region of Eastern Macedonia and Thrace becoming a "second Cyprus" sometime in the future or of being ceded to Turkey on the basis of the ethnic origin of its Muslim inhabitants.

Greek courts have also outlawed the use of the word 'Turkish' to describe the Turkish community. In 1988, the Greek Supreme Court affirmed a 1986 decision of the Court of Appeals of Thrace in which the Union of Turkish Associations of Western Thrace was ordered closed. The court held that the use of the word 'Turkish' referred to citizens of Turkey, and could not be used to describe citizens of Greece; the use of the word 'Turkish' to describe Greek Muslims was held to endanger public order. This led to about 10,000 people demonstrating against the decision in Western Thrace. According to members of the Turkish minority, it was the first time ethnic Turks had taken to the streets.

=== Freedom of expression ===
More than 10 newspapers are issued in the Turkish language. According to some sources, newspapers, magazines and books published in Turkey are not allowed entry into Western Thrace, and Turkish television and radio stations are sometimes jammed. According to other sources, the minority has full and independent access to its own newspapers radio, television, and other written media coming from Turkey, regardless of their content.

=== Religious freedom ===
According to the Treaty of Lausanne, the Muslim minority is entitled to freedom of religion and to the right to control charitable and religious institutions. However, the Turkish community believes that these international law guarantees have been violated by the Greek government by denying permission to repair or rebuild old mosques or to build new mosques, by denying the right to choose the muftis (this chief religious officers), and by efforts to control the Turkish communities charitable foundations. According to another source, more than five new mosques are being built in the prefecture of Xanthi alone and 19 new mosques are being built in the prefecture of Rhodope alone, while in the same prefecture the number of mosques exceeds 160.

=== Incidents ===
According to a report by a local organization there have been frequent (six in 2010 and three in the first months of 2011) attacks against the private and public property of Turks in Western Thrace. Among the recent incidents are three in 2010 (in Kahveci, Kırmahalle, Popos and Ifestos at Komotini) where attackers desecrated Turkish cemeteries and broke tombstones. There were also attacks against mosques, Turkish associations and Turkish consulates, attackers used methods like throwing stones, molotov bombs and damaging buildings.

== Migration ==
=== Diaspora ===
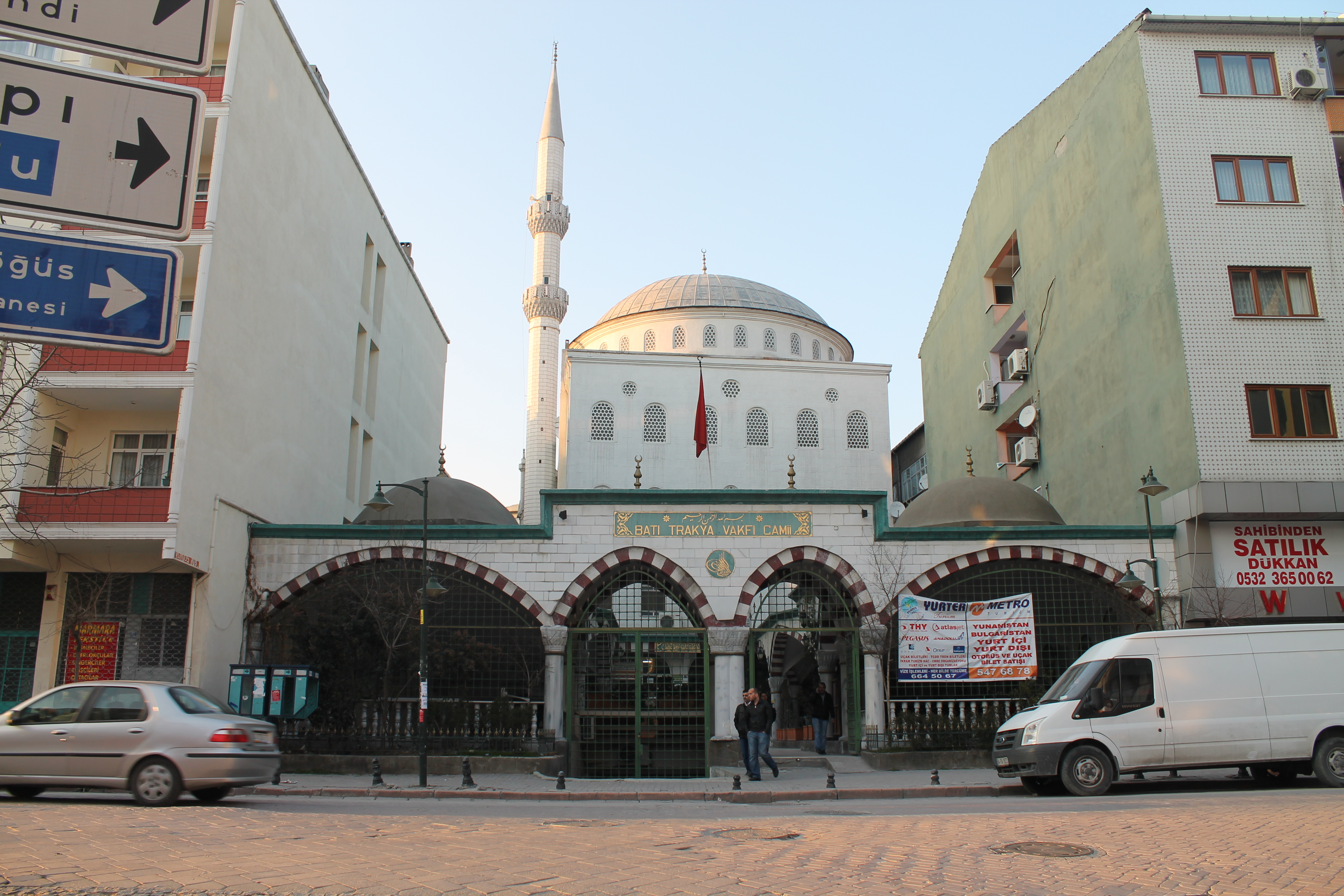
Western Thrace Foundation Mosque in Zeytinburnu, Istanbul

Between 300,000 and 400,000 Turks have left Western Thrace since 1923; most of them immigrated to Turkey. Western Thrace Turks have also immigrated to Germany, the Netherlands, the United States, the United Kingdom, Australia, Austria and Italy. Thus, overall there are an estimated 1 million Turks whose roots are from Western Thrace.

=== Europe ===
It is estimated that there are between 25,000 and 40,000 Western Thrace Turks living in Western Europe.

==== Germany ====
There are some members of the Greek Muslim community among the some 350,000 Greeks living in Germany who are Turks or who espouse a Turkish identity. The majority of Turks immigrated from Western Thrace. In the 1960s and 1970s, the Thracian tobacco industry was affected by a severe crisis and many tobacco growers lost their income. This resulted in many Turks leaving their homes and immigrating to Germany with estimates suggesting that today there are now between 12,000 and 25,000 residing in Germany.

==== Netherlands ====
A minority of Western Thrace Turks can be found in the Netherlands, especially in the Randstad region; after Germany, the Netherlands is the most popular destination for Turkish immigrants.

==== United Kingdom ====
There are an estimated 600–700 Western Thrace Turks living in London although this does not include those who are British-born. The total number living outside London is unknown. However even their small number, Western Thrace Turks in the UK have their own community (Association of Western Thrace Turks UK)

=== Oceania ===
==== Australia ====
There are approximately 600 Western Thrace Turks who predominately live in greater Melbourne and are represented by the Australia Western Thrace Turkish Association. Turks from Western Thrace started immigrating to Australia in 1969 and opened a Turkish language school in 1971. The community organisation was officially established in 1975 in Melbourne and was intended to continue the promotion of the Western Thrace Turkish culture and language. The association has its own building with administration offices, weekend Turkish school, café, prayer room and a function/reception hall based in Windsor (Melbourne). According to the 2021 Australian census, there are 340 people born in Greece who identify as Muslim and 1,943 who identify having Greek ancestry who also identify as Muslim. As of 2025, most Western Thrace Turks are 2nd and 3rd generation with many being born in Australia and have blended into the wider Turkish Australian community.

== Notable people ==
- Simon Atumano, was the Bishop of Gerace in Calabria and was of Greco-Turkish origin
- Ilchan Achmet, Greek politician
- Sadik Achmet, Greek doctor and politician
- Achmet Chatziosman, Greek politician
- Hakan Çavuşoğlu, Turkish Deputy Prime Minister
- Aichan Kara Giousouf, Greek politician
- Cemile Giousouf, German politician (2nd generation Turkish German with roots from Western Thrace)
- Şerif Gören, Turkish film director, Winner of 1982 Palme d'Or in Cannes Film Festival
- Hamza Hamzaoğlu, Turkish football manager of Galatasaray
- Tsetin Mantatzi, Greek politician
- Moustafa Moustafa, Greek politician
- Mehmet Müezzinoğlu, Turkish politician

== See also ==
- 1990 Komotini events
- Turkish minorities in the former Ottoman Empire
  - Turks in the Balkans
  - Cretan Turks
  - Turks of the Dodecanese
- Western Thrace
- Provisional Government of Western Thrace
- Party of Friendship, Equality and Peace
- Turkish Union of Xanthi
- Greeks in Turkey
- Greek Muslims
- Federation of Western Thrace Turks in Europe
- Kardzhali Province

== Bibliography ==
- Ataöv, Türkkaya (1992), THE ETHNIC TURKISH MINORITY IN WESTERN THRACE, GREECE (PDF), The Turkish Yearbook of International Relations
- Cin, Turgay (2009), The Current Problems of the Turks of Western Thrace in Greece as a Member of the European Union (PDF), Ege Academic Review
- Clogg, Richard (2002), Minorities in Greece: Aspects of a Plural Society, C. Hurst & Co. Publishers, ISBN 1-85065-705-X.
- Commission on Security and Cooperation in Europe. "Turkish Minority in Western Thrace" (PDF). Briefing of the Commission on Security and Cooperation in Europe.
- Council of Europe: Parliamentary Assembly (2007), Parliamentary Assembly: Working Papers 2007 Ordinary Session 22–26 January 2007, Council of Europe, ISBN 978-92-871-6191-8.
- Hirschon, Renée (2003), Crossing the Aegean: An Appraisal of the 1923 Compulsory Population Exchange Between Greece and Turkey, Berghahn Books, ISBN 1-57181-562-7.
- Karpat, Kemal (2002), Studies on Ottoman Social and Political History: Selected Articles and Essays, BRILL, ISBN 90-04-12101-3.
- Karpat, Kemal H. (2004), Studies on Turkish Politics and Society: Selected Articles and Essays:Volume 94 of Social, economic, and political studies of the Middle East, BRILL, ISBN 90-04-13322-4.
- Madianou, Mirca (2005), Mediating the nation: news, audiences and the politics of identity, Routledge Cavendish, ISBN 1-84472-028-4.
- Minahan, James (2002), Encyclopedia of the Stateless Nations: S-Z, Greenwood Publishing Group, ISBN 0-313-32384-4.
- Levinson, David (1998), Ethnic groups worldwide: a ready reference handbook, Greenwood Publishing Group, ISBN 978-1-57356-019-1.
- Lytra, Vally (2007), Play frames and social identities: contact encounters in a Greek primary school, John Benjamins Publishing Company, ISBN 978-90-272-5407-8.
- Öksüz, Hikmet (2004), "The Reasons for Immigration from Western Thrace to Turkey (1923-1950)" (PDF), Azınlıkça, archived from the original (PDF) on 2010-02-15
- Panayi, Panikos (1999), Outsiders: a history of European minorities, Continuum International Publishing Group, ISBN 1-57356-019-7.
- Şentürk, Cem (2008), West Thrace Turkish's Immigration to Europe (PDF), The Journal of International Social Research
- Sugar, Peter F. (1983), Southeastern Europe under Ottoman rule, 1354–1804, University of Washington Press, ISBN 0-295-96033-7.
- Westerlund, David; Svanberg, Ingvar (1999), Islam Outside the Arab World, Palgrave Macmillan, ISBN 0-312-22691-8.
- Western Thrace Minority University Graduates Association (2009), Western Thrace Turkish Minority (PDF), Culture and Education Foundation of Western Thrace Minority, archived from the original (PDF) on 2011-07-27
- Whitman, Lois (1990), Destroying ethnic identity: the Turks of Greece, Human Rights Watch, ISBN 0-929692-70-5.
