= Burlington-Edison School District =

Public school district in Skagit County, Washington

Address
- 927 E Fairhaven Ave Burlington, Washington, 98233-1900; United States
- Coordinates: 48°28′34″N 122°19′21″W

District information
- Type: Public
- Motto: Educating each student for lifelong success
- Grades: Pre-K through 12
- Superintendent: Dr. Chris Pearson
- Asst. superintendent(s): Bryan Jones
- Business administrator: Valori Vargas
- School board: 5 members
- Governing agency: OSPI
- Budget: $39,258,000 (2011–2012)
- NCES District ID: 5300780

Students and staff
- Students: 3829 (2013–2014)
- Teachers: 202 (2013–2014)
- Student–teacher ratio: 18.94 (2013–2014)
- Athletic conference: WIAA

Other information
- Website: www.be.wednet.edu

Burlington-Edison School District No. 100 is a public school district in Skagit County, Washington, USA and serves the communities of Alger, Bow, Burlington and Edison.

== Schools ==
=== High schools ===
- Burlington-Edison High School

=== Primary schools ===
- Allen Elementary School
- Bay View Elementary School
- Edison Elementary School
- Lucille Umbarger Elementary School
- West View Elementary School

=== Alternative schools ===
- Burlington North
