= Edison Elementary School =

Edison Elementary School is the name of many primary schools, with most of them named after Thomas Edison. They include:

- Edison Elementary school (Alameda California)
- Edison Elementary School (Ontario, California)
- Edison Elementary School (Long Beach, California)
- Edison Elementary School (Glendale, California)
- Edison Elementary School (Santa Ana, California)
- Edison Elementary School (Torrance, California)
- Edison Elementary School (Denver, Colorado)
- Edison Elementary School (Hammond, Indiana)
- Edison Elementary School (Kankakee, Illinois)
- Edison Elementary School (Fraser, Michigan)
- Thomas A. Edison School (Union City, New Jersey)
- Edison Elementary School (Minot, North Dakota)
- Edison Elementary School (Ashland, Ohio)
- Edison Elementary School (Eugene, Oregon)
- Thomas A. Edison Elementary School (Nashville, Tennessee)
- Edison Elementary School (Edison, Washington)
- Edison Elementary School (Tacoma, Washington)
- Edison Elementary school (Phoenix Arizona)
- Thomas A. Edison Elementary School (Fort Gratiot, Michigan)

Edison Elementary School (Dayton, Ohio)
