= Anacortes School District =

School district in Washington state, United States

Anacortes School District No. 103 is a public school district in Skagit County, Washington which serves the city of Anacortes.

Dr. James Everett is the superintendent of the school district, having entered the role on July 1, 2026.

According to the school's official website, the school district has over 2,500 enrolled students.

== Schools ==
=== High Schools ===
- Anacortes High School

Notable Alumni - Craig Bartlett, Rien Long, Phil Elverum, Bret Lunsford of "Beat Happening"

- Cap Sante High School

=== Middle School ===
- Anacortes Middle School

=== Elementary Schools ===
- Fidalgo Elementary School K-5
- Island View Elementary School K-5
- Mount Erie Elementary School K-5
- Whitney Elementary School Preschool and Kindergarten

=== Special Schools and Programs ===
- Anacortes Home Education Partnership
