= Cetin =

Cetin may refer to:

- Çetin, Turkish name
- Cetin Castle, Croatia
- CETIN, a Czech telecoms company
- CETIN (software engineering), a Kazakh cost estimation method
