= Edison Elementary School (Edison, Washington) =

Coordinates: 48°33′41″N 122°26′17″W

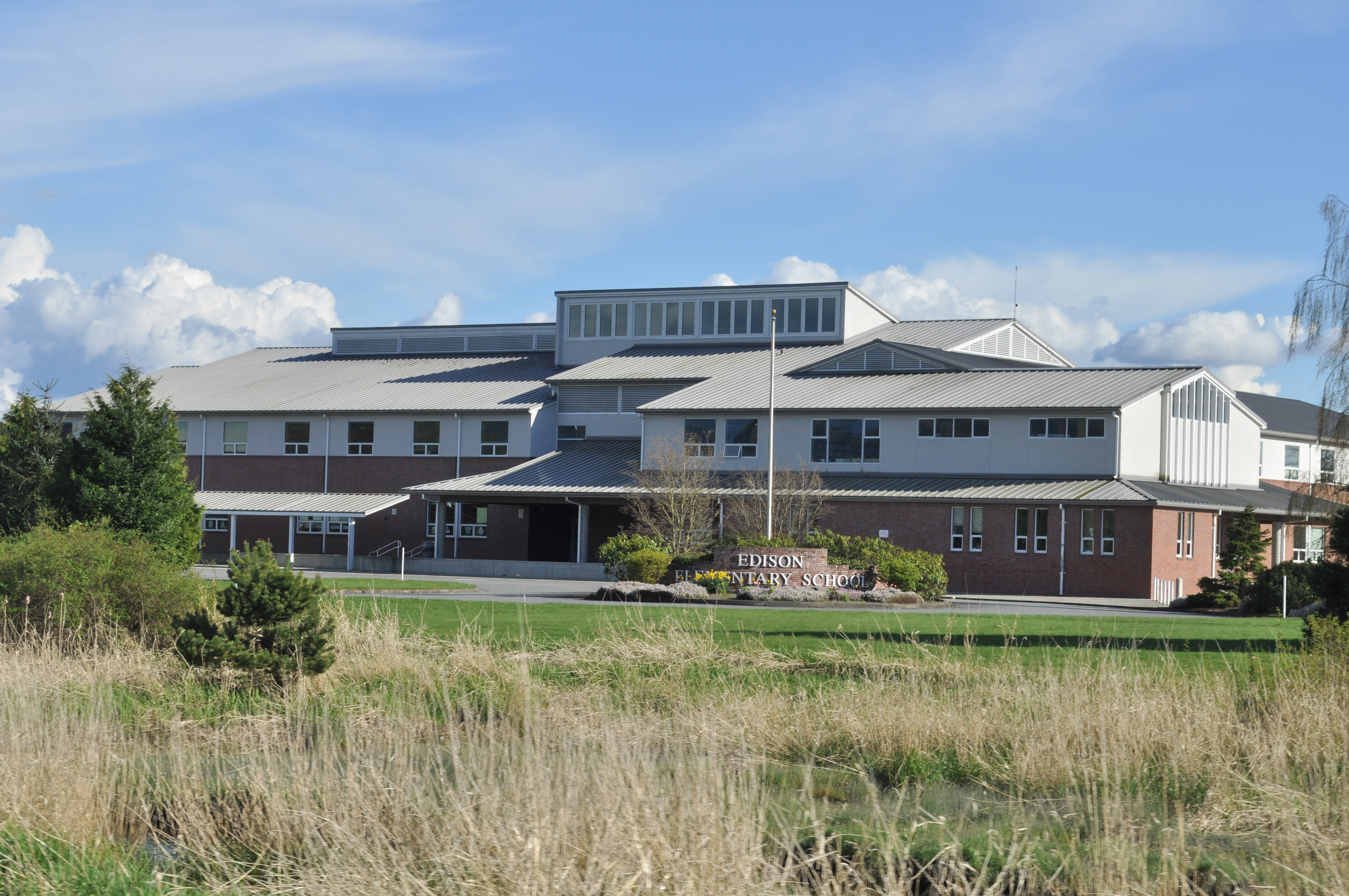
- Edison Elementary, 2013
- Edison, Washington

Information
- Type: Public
- School district: Burlington-Edison School District
- NCES School ID: 530078000156
- Principal: Amy Staudenraus
- Staff: 46
- Grades: K–8
- Enrollment: 444 (as of October 2015)
- Mascot: Wildcat
- Information: (360) 757-3375
- Website: www.be.wednet.edu/o/edison

Edison Elementary School is the name of a K–8 grade school in the town of Edison, Washington, United States. Its mascot is the Wildcat.

== History ==
The original building was built in 1914 and was used for Edison High School, but by the late 1940s, Edison had partnered with nearby Burlington to create the Burlington-Edison School District, including a new high school, Burlington-Edison High School. In 1996, the district tore down the original building and constructed a new building for Edison Elementary.
