= Bow, Washington =

Unincorporated community in Washington, US

- CDP, Unincorporated community
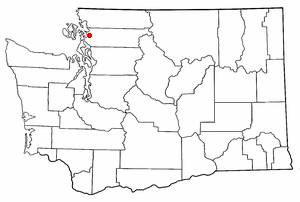
- Location of Edison, Washington
- Interactive map of Bow, Washington
- Coordinates: 48°33′41″N 122°24′28″W
- Country: United States
- State: Washington
- County: Skagit
- Homesteaded: 1869
- Elevation: 13 ft (4.0 m)

Population (2020)
  - Total: 203
- Time zone: UTC−08:00 (Pacific (PST))
  - Summer (DST): UTC−07:00 (PDT)
- Area code: 360, 564
- GNIS feature ID: 2807190

Bow is an unincorporated community and census-designated place in Skagit County, Washington. It is located near the towns of Bay View, Edison, Burlington, and Mount Vernon. Bow is included in the Mount Vernon-Anacortes, Washington Metropolitan Statistical Area. Bow overlooks Samish Bay. The population of Bow is 203 in the 2020 census.

The 2 ft (610 mm) narrow gauge Bow Hill Railroad, complete with a working steam locomotive, is located in the Bow area. It can be found on the private property of Diz Schimke, who allows the public to ride the train during Christmastime in exchange for donations to the Alger food bank.

== History ==
Bow was originally known as Brownsville, after William J. Brown, who homesteaded the townsite in 1869. The advent of the railroad resulted in a population boom and the need for a post office. Apparently inspired by the growth brought by the railroad, Brown suggested the new name of Bow, after the large railway station in London, England, which in turn was named for the bow or poplar tree. Although this is the most common belief, there are some who believe it was named after homesteader James T. Bow.

An alternate story claims that the settlement is named for a Norwegian immigrant family that settled in that area in the 1890s. Their last name was Boe.

== Geography and location ==
Bow is located in Skagit County, Washington, in the Mount Vernon-Anacortes metro area. The original town of Bow was located off Bow Hill Road and included a church, a mercantile, and a hotel. Bow is often confused with the nearby town of Edison, on Samish Bay. Both Edison and Bow - as well as the nearby town of Blanchard - share the Bow zip code.

== Demographics ==
Historical population
Census	Pop.	Note	%±
2020	203		—
U.S. Decennial Census

Bow first appeared as a census designated place in the 2020 U.S. census.

=== Racial and ethnic composition ===
Bow CDP, Washington – Racial and ethnic composition Note: the US Census treats Hispanic/Latino as an ethnic category. This table excludes Latinos from the racial categories and assigns them to a separate category. Hispanics/Latinos may be of any race.
Race / Ethnicity (NH = Non-Hispanic)	Pop 2020	2020
White alone (NH)	179	88.18%
Black or African American alone (NH)	0	0.00%
Native American or Alaska Native alone (NH)	0	0.00%
Asian alone (NH)	4	1.97%
Native Hawaiian or Pacific Islander alone (NH)	0	0.00%
Other race alone (NH)	2	0.99%
Mixed race or Multiracial (NH)	7	3.45%
Hispanic or Latino (any race)	11	5.42%
Total	203	100.00%

== Education ==
It is in the Burlington-Edison School District.
