= Edison, Washington =

- CDP
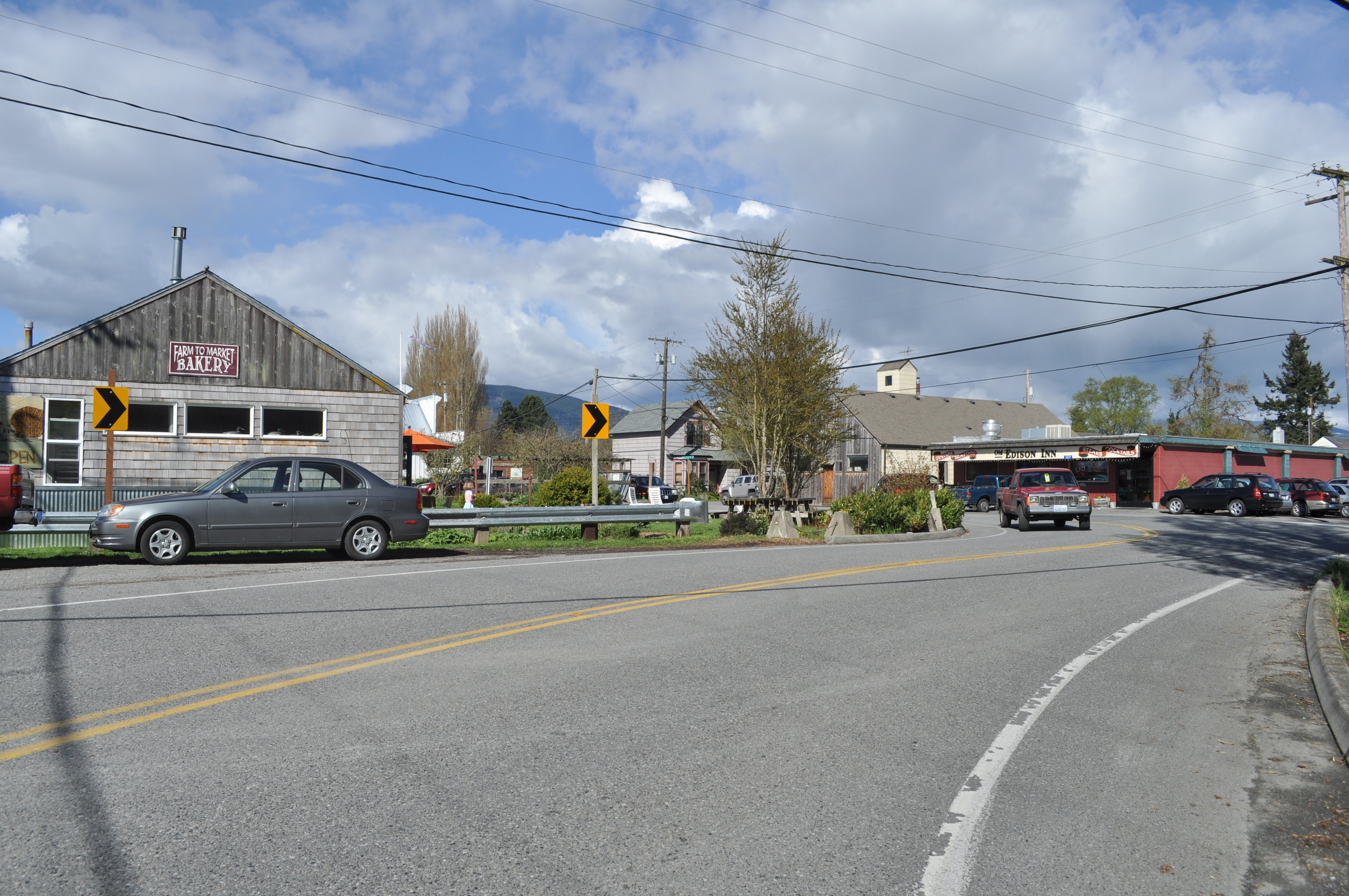
- Approaching the center of Edison from the south on Farm to Market Road

- Location of Edison, Washington
- Coordinates: 48°33′50″N 122°26′05″W
- Country: United States
- State: Washington
- County: Skagit

Area
  - Total: 0.58 sq mi (1.5 km^{2})
  - Land: 0.58 sq mi (1.5 km^{2})
  - Water: 0 sq mi (0.0 km^{2})
- Elevation: 10 ft (3.0 m)

Population (2020)
  - Total: 240
  - Density: 410/sq mi (160/km^{2})
- Time zone: UTC-8 (Pacific (PST))
  - Summer (DST): UTC-7 (PDT)
- ZIP Code: 98232
- Area code: 360, 564
- FIPS code: 53-20680
- GNIS feature ID: 2408046

Edison is a census-designated place (CDP) in Skagit County, Washington, United States. The population was 240 at the 2020 census. It is included in the Mount Vernon–Anacortes, Washington Metropolitan Statistical Area.

Bow–Edison refers to Edison and the neighboring community of Bow, Washington.

== History ==
First settled in 1869 by Ben Samson, it was later named for famous inventor Thomas Alva Edison (1847–1931), with his inventing productive laboratories in Menlo Park, New Jersey, East Orange, New Jersey, and Fort Myers, Florida.

In 1897, Edison became the headquarters of a national utopian socialist project known as Equality Colony, backed by an organization known as the Brotherhood of the Cooperative Commonwealth. The socialist colony was established on 280 acres just outside Edison and it engaged in farming and timber milling and included a school as well as blacksmith and copper-working shops. The Edison-based Brotherhood also published a newspaper called Industrial Freedom for national circulation to its approximately 3,000 supporters. The socialist community folded shortly after 1903, by which time only about 100 colony members remained.

== Geography ==
According to the United States Census Bureau, the CDP has a total area of 0.6 square miles (1.5 km^{2}), all of it land.

== Demographics ==
Historical population
Census	Pop.	Note	%±
2000	133		—
2010	133		0.0%
2020	240		80.5%
U.S. Decennial Census; 1970 1980 1990; 2000 2010

Edison first appeared as a census designated place in the 2000 U.S. census.

=== Racial and ethnic composition ===
Edison CDP, Washington – Racial and ethnic composition Note: the US Census treats Hispanic/Latino as an ethnic category. This table excludes Latinos from the racial categories and assigns them to a separate category. Hispanics/Latinos may be of any race.
Race / Ethnicity (NH = Non-Hispanic)	Pop 2000	Pop 2010	Pop 2020	% 2000	% 2010	% 2020
White alone (NH)	123	127	199	92.48%	95.49%	82.92%
Black or African American alone (NH)	0	3	1	0.00%	2.26%	0.42%
Native American or Alaska Native alone (NH)	5	0	0	3.76%	0.00%	0.00%
Asian alone (NH)	3	0	1	2.26%	0.00%	0.42%
Native Hawaiian or Pacific Islander alone (NH)	0	0	0	0.00%	0.00%	0.00%
Other race alone (NH)	0	0	2	0.00%	0.00%	0.83%
Mixed race or Multiracial (NH)	1	3	25	0.75%	2.26%	10.42%
Hispanic or Latino (any race)	1	0	12	0.75%	0.00%	5.00%
Total	133	133	240	100.00%	100.00%	100.00%

== Economy and culture ==
Edison and neighboring Bow, Washington are popular day trip destinations for residents and visitors to the Skagit Valley, the Seattle area, and Bellingham, Washington. Edison is known for its concentration of artists and galleries, shops, bakeries, and farm-to-table restaurants serving locally sourced ingredients.

The Edison Chicken Parade is an annual event held at "high noon" on the last Sunday in February. The two-block parade last about five minutes and features real-life chickens alongside locals dressed as chickens and other fowl.

== Notable people ==
- George Boomer (1862–1915) and Harry Ault (1883–1961), journalists and members of the Equality Colony
- Edward R. Murrow (1908–1965), news journalist, graduate of Edison High School

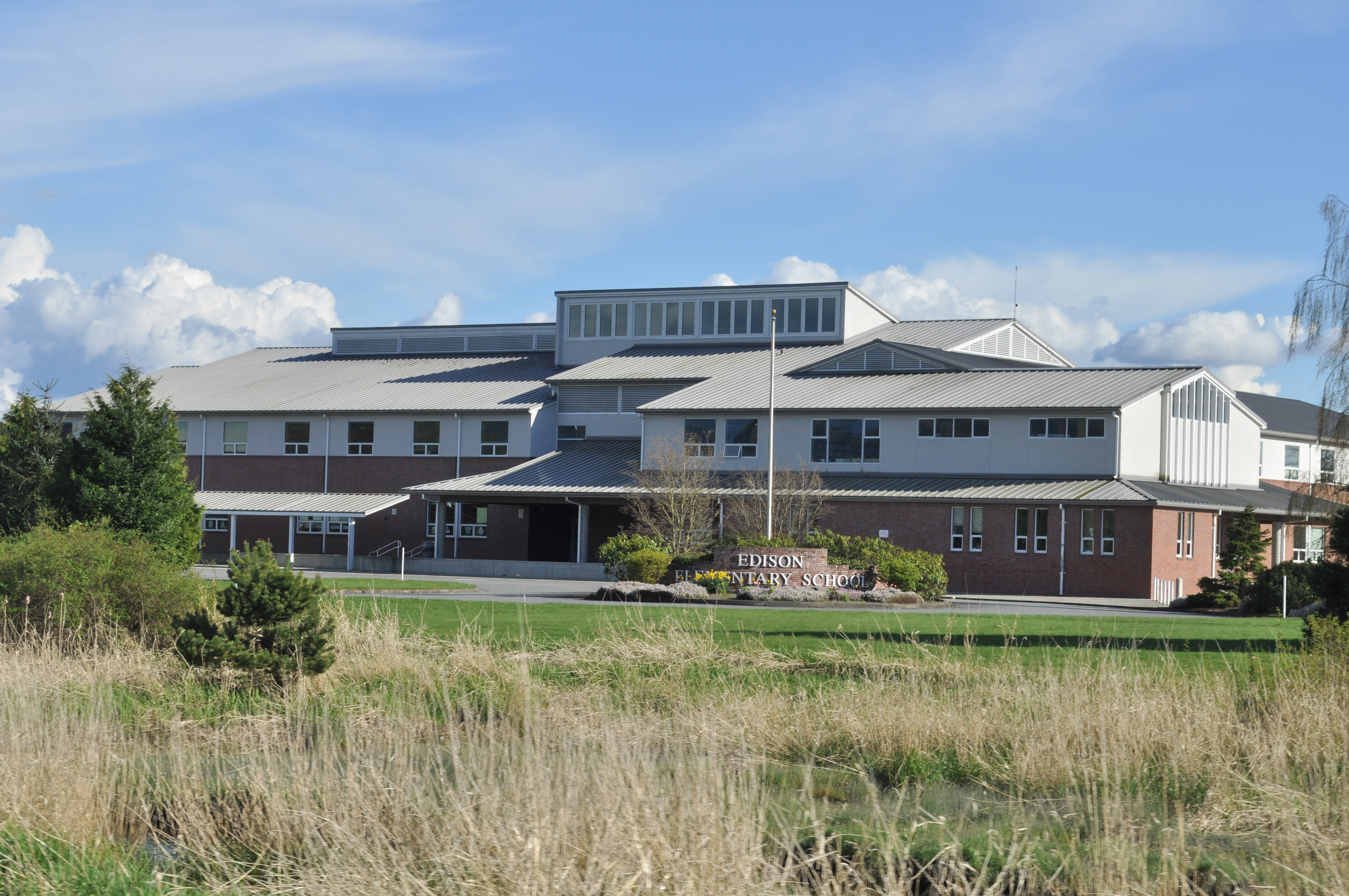
Edison Elementary, 2013

== Education ==
The community is served by the Burlington-Edison School District.

Edison High School was in use as Edison Elementary School until its replacement with a new, larger building in 1996. Currently, the only school located in Edison is (the new) Edison Elementary School, a K-8 school, built on the site of the former Edison High School.

== See also ==
- Equality Colony
- Socialist Party of Washington
