= Çetin Emeç =

Turkish journalist and columnist (1935–1990)

- Born: 1935; Istanbul, Turkey
- Died: 7 March 1990 (aged 54–55); Suadiye, Istanbul, Turkey
- Education: Law School, Istanbul University
- Occupations: Executive editor, chief columnist, media coordinator
- Years active: 1952–1990
- Spouse: Bilge Emeç
- Children: 2

Çetin Emeç (1935 – 7 March 1990) was a prominent Turkish journalist and columnist, who was assassinated.

== Early life ==
He was born to Selim Ragıp Emeç, journalist and later co-founder of the Democratic Party, and his wife Rabia Emeç. He had two sisters, Zeynep and Leyla, and a brother, Aydın.

After finishing the Galatasaray High School, Emeç studied law at Istanbul University. In 1952, he entered journalism at his father's newspaper Son Posta as a reporter. After the 1960 Turkish coup d'état, he became the leader of the newspaper, since his father was imprisoned for his membership in the parliament and the political party, which was on the government at that time.

He served later as editor-in-chief at the popular weekly magazines Hayat and Ses until 1972. Between 1972 and 1984, Emeç was the executive editor of the liberal rightist daily Hürriyet. In 1984, he switched to another major newspaper Milliyet that lasted until 1986. He returned to Hürriyet Media Group to become its coordinator and chief columnist. He was also appointed a member of the board.

== Death ==
Çetin Emeç was assassinated in the morning of 7 March 1990 in front of his home in Suadiye, Istanbul as he got in his car to go to his office. Two gunmen wearing ski mask and sunglasses approached the car he was already seated in. While one gunman opened the right back door and fired his gun with silencer, the other one shot from the left back door's window. His driver, Sinan Ercan, tried to escape, however, was shot down as well.

Severely injured by seven bullets, Çetin Emeç was taken to a nearby hospital. However, it has been declared that he died already during the transportation. His driver died at the crime scene.

Soon after the attack, someone called the newspaper Hürriyet and told that "he was calling on behalf of the organization 'Türk İslam Komandoları Birliği' (literally: The Turkish Union of Islam's Commandos, an Iranian-based militant group) and took on the responsibility for the murder of Çetin Emeç, adding they will kill everyone (in the newspaper)". During the day, someone, who spoke clear Turkish language, called Hürriyet's office in Berlin, Germany and said "We killed Çetin Emeç. Dev-Sol, (literally: Revolutionary People's Liberation Party–Front, a Marxist-Leninist militant organization)".

Emeç was buried at the Zincirlikuyu Cemetery in Istanbul. His murder remained so far unsolved.

Çetin Emeç was survived by his wife Bilge, a daughter Mehveş and a son Mehmet (Memo). Mehveş Emeç became a notable classical pianist. Memo Emeç is the General Manager of Vialand.

== Legacy ==
A football stadium in Bayrampaşa, Istanbul and several streets across the country are named after him.

== See also ==
- List of unsolved murders (1980–1999)
