= Danielle Fisher =

American mountain climber (born 1985)

Danielle Fisher (born 1985) is an American mountain climber who in 2005 became the youngest person to complete the Seven Summits and the youngest American to climb Mount Everest.

== Biography ==
Fisher was raised in Bow, Washington, where she was introduced to the outdoors at an early age, visiting the Cascade Mountains often with her parents and sister. She struggled academically throughout elementary school, and was diagnosed with attention deficit disorder in the sixth grade. By her junior year of high school, she had climbed Mount Adams, Mount Baker and Mount Rainier with her father and Mike Woodmansee, an experienced mountaineer, and had soon resolved to climb the Seven Summits, the highest mountains in each of the seven continents.

Fisher began her bid to complete the Seven Summits in January 2003, with Aconcagua in Argentina, followed in July by Kilimanjaro in Tanzania and Mount Elbrus in Russia. In 2004, she climbed Mount Kosciuszko in Australia in January, and Denali in May. She climbed her penultimate peak of the Seven Summits, Vinson Massif in Antarctica, in January 2005. In June 2005, Fisher successfully reached the summit of Mount Everest in Nepal, making her at 20 years old the youngest American to have done so at the time. Her ascent of Everest marked her completion of the Seven Summits; she became the youngest person ever to have completed the challenge. Most of Fisher's Seven Summit climbs were made with expeditions run by Alpine Ascents International, a Seattle-based guiding company, costing a total of US$96,000.

Fisher attended Washington State University, where she majored in material science engineering with plans to work in the production of climbing equipment.
