= Lowell Wakefield =

Lowell Alvin Wakefield (August 17, 1909 – 1977) is regarded as the founder of the Alaskan king crab industry, and Port Wakefield on the north-east coast of Raspberry Island, Alaska is named after him.

Lowell Alvin Wakefield was born in Anacortes, Washington on August 17, 1909, to Emma Lanora (née Easter) and Lee Howard Wakefield. His father, a native of Texas, was well known in the salmon and herring industries throughout the Pacific Northwest.

Wakefield was a committed Communist as a young man. He was expelled from the University of Washington for leading a student protest against the ROTC. In 1931, he covered and wrote dispatches from The Scottsboro Boys trial. Back in Washington State in 1932, he founded and edited the "Voice of Action", The State Communist Party newspaper. By 1938, Wakefield was a correspondent for "The Daily Worker", the CPUSA national publication. (The Millionaire was a Soviet Mole, The Twisted Life of David Karr by Harvey Klehr, published by Encounter Books, 2019. Chapter One: Young Radical on The Make)

He established Port Wakefield shortly after World War II by Wakefield, having relocated his father's salmon cannery business, Apex Fish Company, from Anacortes, Washington, to Raspberry Island, Alaska, renaming it Wakefield Fisheries.

Wakefield, who is regarded as the founder of the Alaskan king crab industry, introduced the canning and freezing of king crab, partly because of declining salmon stocks in surrounding waters. As well as the cannery, cedar log houses and a church were built for the workers.
