= Cascade Mall =

- Location: Burlington, Washington, United States
- Coordinates: 48°27′44″N 122°20′21″W
- Address: 201 Cascade Mall Drive
- Opened: 1989
- Closed: June 30, 2020
- Developer: Winmar
- Owner: Burlington Investment Properties
- Num. of stores: 50+ (7 open)
- Num. of anchor tenants: 6 (2 open, 4 vacant)
- Floor area: 595,000 square feet (55,000 m^{2})
- Floors: 1 (2 in AMC Theatres)

Cascade Mall is a shopping mall in Burlington, Washington, United States that formerly had an interior walkway. Opened in November 1989, the mall's anchor stores are AMC Theatres and TJ Maxx. There are 4 vacant anchor stores that were once 2 Macy's stores, Sears, and JCPenney. Macerich owned the property before selling it to Merlone Geier Partners in January 2017. The mall permanently closed on June 30, 2020, due to the COVID-19 pandemic in Washington. Some stores will be allowed to stay open if they provide essential services, including those on the outer perimeter. As of 2024, the Cascade Mall has been renamed into the Burlington Gallery.

== History ==
Cascade Mall was built in 1989 by Winmar Company. Its original anchor stores were JCPenney, The Bon Marché, Troutman's Emporium, and Sears.

Winmar also built an adjacent strip mall called Cross Court, featuring a Target store. The opening of the mall caused many stores to close in nearby Anacortes. The Emporium store later became a second Bon Marché before both Bon Marché stores were re-branded as Macy's.

In 2012, mall management removed the food court and replaced it with a TJ Maxx.

On October 16, 2014, it was announced that Sears would be closing in January 2015. JCPenney followed suit in 2018. In January 2020, Macy's announced that it would close both of its stores as part of a plan to close 125 stores nationwide, leaving AMC Theatres and TJ Maxx as the only remaining anchor stores left.

Cascade Mall was sold to Merlone Geier Partners in January 2017 for $25 million.

=== Mass shooting ===
Five people were killed in a mass shooting at the mall on September 23, 2016. The shooter was Arcan Cetin, a 20-year-old immigrant from Turkey.

== Closure and sale ==
On June 9, 2020, Cascade Mall announced that it would close permanently as a mall with interior access on June 30, citing the impacts of the COVID-19 pandemic in Washington. The interior is set to close, while exterior-facing tenants will be able to continue to operate. The mall was acquired by Burlington Investment Properties, the owners of the adjacent outlet mall, in April 2023 for $18.5 million. It was rebranded as the Burlington Gallery in 2024 and new tenants were announced with a focus on non-retail uses; these include a church, pickleball club, and restaurants.
