= Çetin Güngör =

Turkish footballer

Personal information
- Full name: Çetin Güngör
- Date of birth: 17 June 1990 (age 36)
- Place of birth: Istanbul, Turkey
- Height: 1.78 m (5 ft 10 in)
- Position: Right back

Team information
- Current team: Eyüpspor

Youth career
- 2002–2005: Beşyüzevler Spor
- 2005–2009: Galatasaray

Senior career*
Years	Team	Apps	(Gls)
2007–2010	Galatasaray A2	47	(5)
2009–2011	Galatasaray	1	(0)
2010–2011	→ Şanlıurfaspor (loan)	20	(0)
2011–2012	Gaziantepspor	3	(0)
2012–2013	Çaykur Rizespor	1	(0)
2013–2014	Altay	8	(0)
2014–2016	Nilüferspor	30	(0)
2016–	Eyüpspor	1	(0)

International career
2007–2008	Turkey U18	3	(0)
2008–2009	Turkey U19	10	(0)
2010	Turkey U20	2	(0)
- * Club domestic league appearances and goals as of 27 December 2016

Çetin Güngör (born 7 June 1990) is a Turkish footballer who plays as a defender for Eyüpspor.

== Club career ==
=== Galatasaray S.K. ===
Çetin Güngör rose through the ranks of the Galatasaray youth and academy team, and was promoted to Galatasaray S.K. first team during the 2009–10 season.

=== Kartalspor ===
In the summer of 2010 he signed for Turkish Second League side Şanlıurfaspor on loan.

=== Gaziantepspor ===
On 27 June 2011, he signed a four-year contract with Gaziantepspor on free transfer.

=== Çaykur Rizespor ===
After struggling to become the first team at Gaziantepspor for the 2011–12 season, he moved to Çaykur Rizespor on a two-year contract in August 2012.

== Career statistics ==
=== Club ===
Club performance			League		Cup		Europe		Total	
Club	Division	Season	Apps	Goals	Apps	Goals	Apps	Goals	Apps	Goals
Turkey			League		Turkish Cup		Europe		Total	
Galatasaray S.K.	Süper Lig	2009–10	1	0	2	0	1	0	4	0
Galatasaray S.K.	Süper Lig	Club Total	1	0	2	0	1	0	4	0
TOTAL	Turkey		1	0	2	0	1	0	4	0
CAREER TOTAL			1	0	2	0	1	0	4	0
Correct as of 31 January 2011
