= Northwest Educational School District 189 =

School district in Washington, United States

Northwest Educational School District 189 is located in Anacortes, Washington, United States. It serves over 35 school districts in Western Washington and runs over fifty separate programs. It is one of nine special school districts in Washington State set aside for the purpose of serving regular school districts with needed programs and services through opt-in and contracts.
