= Ahmet Hacıosman =

Greek politician

Ahmet Hacıosman or Achmet Chatzi Osman (Greek: Αχμέτ Χατζηοσμάν Achmét Chatziosmán; born 1 January 1958 in Komotini) is a Greek politician from the West Thracian Turkish minority.

He has been elected to the Greek Parliament for the Panhellenic Socialist Movement in 2007 and was reelected in 2009 and in May 2012.

Professor and farmer, he graduated from the Superior Institute of Theology of Marmara University in Turkey and is married to Fadile Ali Oglu. They have a son and a daughter.

From 1985 to 1990 he was chief editor of Hakka Davet. In 1986 he was elected as an alderman at the Komotini municipality. From 1991 to 2001 he was the President of the School Council of the Mastanli Minority Elementary School in Komotini. In 1999 he was elected general secretary of the Association of West Thracian Minority Scientists. From 1999 to 2007 he was the president of the Party of Friendship, Equality and Peace, based in Komotini. He was elected in 2002 and 2006 at the Rhodope Prefecture, and was its vice-prefect from 2002 to 2007, when he was elected to the Hellenic Parliament
