= Rien Long =

American football player (born 1981)

No. 99
- Position: Defensive tackle

Personal information
- Born: August 7, 1981 (age 45); Los Angeles, California, U.S.
- Listed height: 6 ft 6 in (1.98 m)
- Listed weight: 300 lb (136 kg)

Career information
- High school: Anacortes (Anacortes, Washington)
- College: Washington State
- NFL draft: 2003: 4th round, 126th overall pick

Career history
- Tennessee Titans (2003–2006); Florida Tuskers (2009)*
- * Offseason or practice squad member only

Awards and highlights
- Outland Trophy (2002); Consensus All-American (2002); First-team All-Pac-10 (2002); Second-team All-Pac-10 (2001)

Career NFL statistics
- Total tackles: 63
- Sacks: 9.5
- Forced fumbles: 1
- Stats at Pro Football Reference

Rien Michael Long (born August 7, 1981) is an American former professional football player who was a defensive tackle in the National Football League (NFL). He played college football for the Washington State Cougars, earning consensus All-American honors and recognition as the top college interior lineman in 2002. The Tennessee Titans chose him in the fourth round of the 2003 NFL draft, and he played for the Titans until his pro career was cut short by injuries.

== Early life ==
Long was born in Los Angeles, California. He attended Anacortes High School in Anacortes, Washington.

== College career ==
Long accepted an athletic scholarship to attend Washington State University, where he played for the Washington State Cougars football team from 2000 to 2002. As a junior in 2002, he won the Outland Trophy as that year's best college football interior lineman, and was recognized as a consensus first-team All-American.

== Professional career ==
=== Tennessee Titans ===
The Titans drafted Long in the fourth round in 2003, and he started five of 39 games through his first three seasons with 9½ career sacks and 99 career tackles. He missed the 2006 season with a torn Achilles' tendon, then was placed on injured reserve for 2007 with a knee injury before being waived.

=== Florida Tuskers ===
Long was selected by the Florida Tuskers on the UFL Premiere Season Draft in 2009 and signed with the team on September 3. He was released on September 22.

== Television career ==
Long co-starred in Going Native on Animal Planet with his brother Devan Long. The pair subject themselves to the 9,000-year-old rites of passage of the Tatooya tribe in the Colombian Amazon to begin their journey into manhood, including ceremonial vomiting, blowdart hunting and ritual whipping. The show first aired on June 7, 2015.

== Personal ==
Long is of one-fourth Armenian descent and cherishes his heritage greatly. He has a tattoo of the seventh letter of the Armenian alphabet (Է) over the Armenian flag on his biceps. Rien Long's trip to Armenia and Nagorno-Karabakh in March 2006 was the subject of a feature-length documentary, The Long Journey from the NFL to Armenia

Rien has one son by the name of Gavon who plays soccer, football, and basketball in Anacortes.

Just before midnight on January 21, 2008, Long crashed his 2005 Ford Mustang into a rock wall while driving too fast on an I-40 on-ramp near downtown Nashville. Long was taken to Vanderbilt University Medical Center where he suffered injuries that left him in critical condition.
