= Grant Leep =

American college basketball coach

Current position
- Title: Assistant Coach
- Team: Seattle University
- Conference: Western Athletic Conference

Biographical details
- Born: September 30, 1979 (age 47); Mount Vernon, Washington

Playing career
- 1998-2002: Washington
- Position: Forward

Coaching career (HC unless noted)
- 2002-2003: North Seattle Community College (assistant)
- 2003-2005: Spokane Community College (assistant)
- 2005-2009: Eastern Washington (assistant)
- 2009-2016: Seattle Pacific (assistant)
- 2016-2023: Seattle Pacific
- 2023-present: Seattle (assistant)

Head coaching record
- Overall: 114–69 (.623)
- Tournaments: 1–1 (.500) (NCAA Division II)

Grant Leep (born September 30, 1979) is an American college basketball coach who is currently an assistant coach for the Seattle University men's basketball team. He previously served as the head coach at Seattle Pacific and played college basketball for the Washington Huskies.

== Early life and playing career ==
=== High school ===
Leep grew up in Mount Vernon, Washington, attending Mount Vernon High School. During his high school career, he was an all-state selection three times, and his team also made it into the state tournament three times, losing in the 1997 championship game in his junior year after compiling a 28-1 record, and losing in the state semifinal game his senior year in 1998. He averaged 20.1 points and 9 rebounds per game his sophomore year, 18.2 points and 8.5 rebounds per game his junior year, and 17.3 points per game his senior year. He was also named the Gatorade Player of the Year for Washington in 1998, as well as being named Washington Mr. Basketball that same year.

=== College ===
Leep attended the University of Washington from 1998-2002 and played under head coach Bob Bender. He appeared in 21 games in his freshman season, but he only appeared in 10 games in his sophomore season before missing the rest of the season with a knee injury. He appeared in 29 games and made one start his junior season, averaging 3.1 points and 1.8 rebounds per game. In his senior season, he appeared in 29 games and made 27 starts, averaging 7.8 points and 4.1 rebounds per game. During his senior season, Leep shot 52.7% (39-of-74) from 3-point range, a school record for highest such percentage in a single season, and he also holds the school record for highest career 3-point shooting percentage, shooting 42.9% (60-of-140).

== Coaching career ==
After graduating from Washington, he became an assistant coach at North Seattle Community College, where he stayed for a year before becoming an assistant coach for Spokane Community College, where he stayed for two seasons between 2003-2005. From 2005-2009, Leep was an assistant coach for Eastern Washington, where he worked under head coach Mike Burns and later Kirk Earlywine. The team went 53-66 in the four seasons he was there and included players such as Rodney Stuckey, who would later go on to be a first round draft pick in the 2007 NBA Draft and have his jersey retired by the school on January 11, 2009, the first such retirement in school history.

=== Seattle Pacific (assistant) ===
On June 23, 2009, Leap became an assistant head coach at Seattle Pacific under then-head coach Ryan Looney, who had just been hired a month earlier on May 26 from Eastern Oregon. Under Looney, from 2009-2016, the Falcons went 164-51 (.763) and had a school record streak of 7 consecutive 20-win seasons.

=== Seattle Pacific ===
On May 9, 2016, Leep officially became the 12th head coach of Seattle Pacific after Looney left to become the head coach at Point Loma. The team, which had claimed a playoff berth in 12 consecutive seasons going into Leep's first season as head coach, went 12-16 and finished tied for 9th in the GNAC conference standings. In 2017, the Falcons ended the season 17-12, finishing tied for fourth in the conference standings. In 2018, Leep lead the Falcons to a 22-7 record, finishing second in the regular-season conference standings but winning the conference tournament with a 78-66 win over Northwest Nazarene. They qualified for the 2019 NCAA Division II Tournament, where they beat Chaminade 77-75 in the first round before falling 67-63 to Saint Martin's. In 2019, the Falcons finished with a 22-7 overall record and finished first in the conference with an 18-2 conference record. They were scheduled to face Chico State in the 2020 NCAA Division II Tournament before it was cancelled as a result of the COVID-19 pandemic. Leep was also named the 2020 GNAC Coach of the Year after the season. The Falcons went 10-3 in a season shortened due to the pandemic in 2020-21, and in the 2021-22 season, they went 14-13 and finished sixth in the conference standings. During the 2022-23 season, in which the Falcons finished 17-11, Leep reached his 100th win as the head coach of the school on November 26, 2022, with a 97-71 victory over Warner Pacific. They would finish third in the conference standings but be eliminated during the first round of the conference tournament with an 82-74 loss to Northwest Nazarene.

=== Seattle (assistant) ===
On April 24, 2023, Leep stepped down as the head coach of Seattle Pacific, and on May 24, 2023, he was named as an assistant coach at Seattle University under head coach Chris Victor.

== Head coaching record ==
Record table
| Season | Team | Overall | Conference | Standing | Postseason |
|---|---|---|---|---|---|
Seattle Pacific Falcons (GNAC) (2016–2023)
| 2016–17 | Seattle Pacific | 12-16 | 8-12 | T-9th | |
| 2017–18 | Seattle Pacific | 17-12 | 11-9 | T-4th | |
| 2018–19 | Seattle Pacific | 22-7 | 16-4 | 2nd | NCAA Division II Round of 32 |
| 2019–20 | Seattle Pacific | 22-7 | 18-2 | 1st | Postseason canceled due to COVID-19 |
| 2020–21 | Seattle Pacific | 10-3 | N/A | N/A | |
| 2021–22 | Seattle Pacific | 14-13 | 7-8 | 6th | |
| 2022–23 | Seattle Pacific | 17-11 | 12-6 | 3rd | |
| Seattle Pacific: | | 114–69 (.623) | 82–41 (.667) | | |
| Total: | | 114–69 (.623) | | | |
National champion Postseason invitational champion Conference regular season champion Conference regular season and conference tournament champion Division regular season champion Division regular season and conference tournament champion Conference tournament champion

== Personal life ==
Leep is married to Allison Leep, a former volleyball player at Washington. They have two daughters together: Avery and Harper.
