= Anacortes High School =

Secondary school in Anacortes, Washington, United States

Location
- Anacortes, Washington; United States; 48.507118225098°N 122.6224822998°W

Information
- School district: Anacortes School District
- Teaching staff: 37.77 (FTE)
- Enrollment: 746 (2023-2024)
- Student to teacher ratio: 19.75
- Nickname: Seahawks
- Publication: The Seahawk Journal
- Yearbook: Rhododendron
- Website: www.asd103.org/ahs

Anacortes High School is a high school in Anacortes, Washington, United States. It is operated by Anacortes School District, also known as Anacortes School District No. 103.

A building project at the school led to a claim from Sturgeon Electric, an electrical construction subcontractor, over unexpected expenses.

== Athletics ==
Anacortes has a total of 23 sports teams.

- Boys teams: Baseball, Basketball, Cross Country, Football, Golf, Soccer, Swim and Dive, Tennis, Track & Field, Wrestling
- Girls teams: Basketball, Bowling, Cross Country, Golf, Soccer, Softball, Swim and Dive, Tennis, Track & Field, Volleyball, Wrestling
- Co-Ed teams: Cheer, Sailing

Anacortes has won eleven state championships.

- Football: 2023 (2A), 2024 (2A)
- Boys Swim and Dive: 2014-15 (2A), 2015-16 (2A), 2017-18 (2A), 2021-22 (2A)
- Girls Swim and Dive: 2005-06 (2A)
- Softball: 1994 (3A)
- Track and Field: 2024 (2A), 2025 (2A), 2026 (2A)

Anacortes is the only Washington 2A school to threepeat as Track and Field State Champions
