= Mount Vernon High School (Washington) =

Coordinates: 48°25′26″N 122°19′39″W

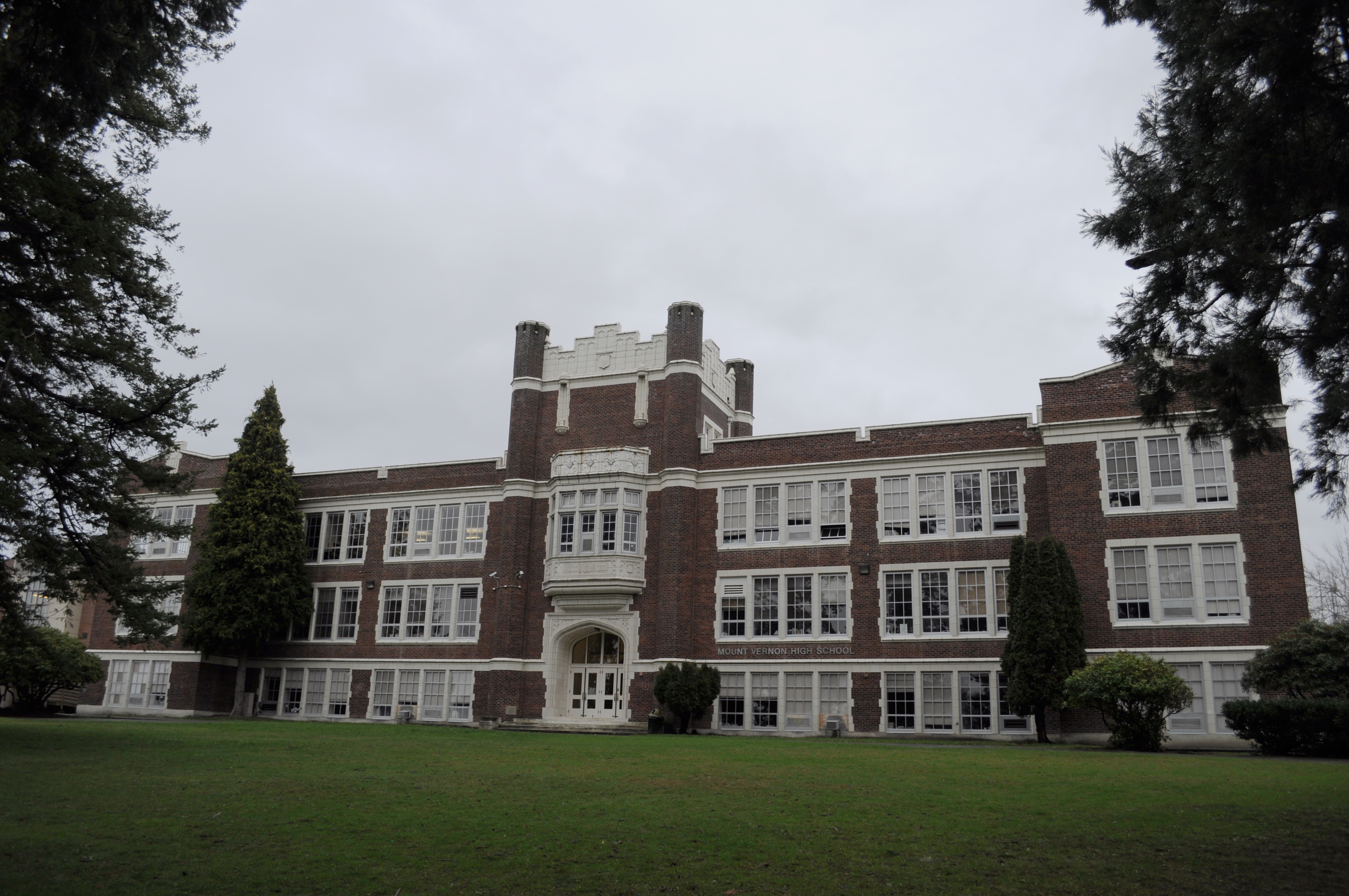

Location
- 1075 E Fulton St. Mount Vernon, Washington, United States

Information
- Former name: Union High School
- Type: Public secondary school, grades 9-12
- School district: Mount Vernon School District
- Principal: Colette Roche
- Staff: 89.14 (FTE)
- Enrollment: 1,849 (2024-2024)
- Student to teacher ratio: 20.74
- Colors: Green & White
- Athletics conference: Northwest Conference 3A; Wesco 3A (Football only)
- Nickname: Bulldogs
- Rivals: Burlington-Edison; Sedro-Woolley
- Yearbook: Skagina
- Website: http://mvhs.mountvernonschools.org

Mount Vernon High School (MVHS) is a high school in Mount Vernon, Washington. The school was originally known as Union High School. With a student body nearing 2,000, it is the largest public high school in Skagit County, Washington.

== Athletics ==
=== Gymnasium & Field House ===
Built in 1951, the Mount Vernon High School gymnasium features original wooden bleachers and other classic architectural features.

In 2003 the MVHS gym was ranked first among twenty of the state's top high school gymnasiums by the Seattle Times. The story referred to it as "the gold standard of high-school gymnasiums" and "the Sistine Chapel of Washington gyms".

=== Basketball ===
Mount Vernon is known for its athletic success in high school basketball. The Bulldogs' boys basketball team found major success under Mac Fraser, head coach from 1986–2001, who was elected into the Washington Interscholastic Basketball Coaches Association Hall of Fame in 2005.

The Bulldogs won consecutive WIAA Class 3A state titles in 1991 and 1992 led by future NBA player Mark Hendrickson. In 2000 the Bulldogs lost in the state title game to Seattle Prep, but returned the next year to defeat Rainier Beach for the 2001 title. The Bulldogs were undefeated in 1991 and 2001.

== Music & Forensics ==
Mount Vernon is known for its musical programs, specifically its Band, Choir, and Mariachi programs. Its band program, under the direction of Skagit Symphony director Jason Rose, as well as the Choir program under the direction of Jesus Gomez, have achieved consistent representation at the WMEA Solo & Ensemble competition, with the Percussion Ensemble directed by Daisy Cardona having been invited to the 2024 Percussive Arts Society International Competition. The school's Mariachi program has also been noted for being a unique offering, with it being one of the few existing in Washington State.

The Mount Vernon speech & debate program has been also successful, with the team being a leading chapter of the National Speech & Debate Association and its "100 club", holding 27 nationals appearances.

== Notable alumni ==
- Cheryl Bentyne, singer with The Manhattan Transfer.
- Jim Caviezel, film and television actor.
- Ethan Chapin, victim in the 2022 University of Idaho murders
- Lawrence Colburn, United States Army helicopter crew member who intervened to stop the Mỹ Lai massacre.
- Don Eldridge, politician and Speaker of the Washington House of Representatives
- Mark Hendrickson, NBA player and MLB pitcher.
- Craig Kelly, pioneer snowboarder.
- Kyle Kendrick, MLB pitcher and 2008 World Series champion.
- Jane Lawrence, actress and opera singer, played Gertie in the original Broadway production of Oklahoma!.
- Grant Leep, Head men's basketball coach at Seattle Pacific University.
- Chad Lindberg, film and television actor.
- Alden Mason, painter and professor of art at the University of Washington.
- Ross Mathews, "Ross the Intern" on the Tonight Show, tv host and television personality.
- Kathi McDonald, singer and songwriter.
- Xavier Neyens, American baseball player in the Houston Astros organization
- Amberleigh West, Playboy Playmate.
