= Sevil Rojbin Çetin =

Turkish statesperson (born 1979)

Sevil Rojbin Çetin (born 1979, Hakkâri) is a Turkish politician of Kurdish origin. She served as the co-mayor of the Edremit district of Van from March 31, 2014, to September 17, 2015.

== Biography ==
Çetin was born in Hakkâri in 1979. She completed her primary, secondary, and high school education there. In 1998, she graduated from the Department of Sociology at Süleyman Demirel University. In 1999, she entered politics through the Democratic People’s Party (DEHAP). She worked on women’s rights within the Democratic Free Women’s Movement. In 2010, she served as Secretary of the Hakkâri Branch of the Human Rights Association (İHD). She also worked as a mayoral advisor at the Van Bostaniçi Municipality. In the 2014 local elections, she ran alongside Abdülkerim Sayan as co-mayor of Edremit from the Peace and Democracy Party (BDP) and won.

== Removal from office ==
On August 15, 2015, Çetin participated in a press statement in which the People's Assembly declared self-governance. She was taken into custody on August 24, 2015, and was arrested by the Van 1st Criminal Court of Peace on charges under Article 302 of the Turkish Penal Code for "undermining the unity of the state and attempting to separate part of the territory under the sovereignty of the state from state administration." On September 17, 2015, she was suspended from her duties by the Ministry of Interior of the Republic of Turkey as an administrative measure. She was imprisoned for over a year, and released on 20 October 2016.
