= Ilchan Achmet =

Greek politician (born 1968)

- Born: 2 April 1968 (age 57); Komotini, Greece
- Occupation: Politician

Ilchan Achmet (Greek: Αχμέτ Ιλχάν, romanized: Achmét Ilchán, also spelt as İlhan Ahmet, born 2 April 1968, in Komotini, Greece) is a Greek politician of Turkish origin.

He studied law at the Istanbul University and graduated in 1993. In 2000-2001 he served as secretary general of the Western Thrace Minority University Graduates Association, and was a member of the Rhodope prefectural council. He was elected MP of Rhodope in the 2004 legislative elections for the conservative New Democracy. In the elections of 2007 and 2009 he failed to be elected, but was re-elected to the Greek Parliament in the September 2015 elections for the social-liberal party To Potami.

Since 1999 he has worked as a lawyer in Komotini. He is married to teacher Belgin Hakkı and has two children.
