= Edanur Çetin =

Turkish handball player (born 2000)

Personal information
- Born: 30 May 2000 (age 26) Eskişehir, Turkey
- Height: 1.72 m (5 ft 8 in)

Sport
- Sport: Handball
- Position: Centert back
- Current club: Bursa BB SK
- Number: 61

Senior clubs
- Years: Team
- 2018–2021: Muratpaşa Bld. SK
- 2021–2024: Konyaaltı Bld. SK
- 2024–: Bursa BB SK
National team
- Years: Team
- –: Turkey
Medal record
Representing Turkey
Women's Handball

Edanur Çetin (born 30 May 2000), also known as Eda Nur Çetin, is a Turkish handballer, who plays for Bursa BB SK and the Turkey national team. The 1.72 m (5 ft 8 in)-tall sportswoman plays in the center back position.

== Personal life ==
Edanur Çetin was born in Eskişehir, Turkey on 30 May 2000.

== Club career ==
Çetin is 1.72 m (5 ft 8 in) tall, and plays in the center back position.

She started her handball playing career in Antalya at Muratpaşa Bld. SK in 2018. She transferred to Konyaaltı Bld. SK also in Antalya in 2021, and to Bursa BB SK in 2024.

She played for Muratpaşa Bld. Sk at the EHF Women's European Cup in 2018–19, 2019–20, 2020–21,and at the EHF Women's Champions League in 2018–19. For Konyaaltı Bld. SK, she participated at the EHF Women's European Cup in 2022–23 and 2023–24, . With Bursa BB SK, she took part at the 2024–26 EHF Women's European Cup.

== International career ==
Çetin is a member of the national team. She was part of the team at the 2024 European Women's Handball Championship, and 2025 World Women's Handball Championship – European qualification.
