= Tsetin Mantatzi =

Turco-Greek politician (born 1970)

Tsetin Mandatzi

Member of the Parliament for Xanthi
- In office 2007–2012

Personal details
- Born: 1970 (age 55–56) Xanthi, Greece
- Party: PASOK

Tsetin Mantatzi (Greek: Τσετίν Μάντατζη, romanized: Tsetín Mántatzi; Turkish: Çetin Mandacı; born 7 March 1970) is a Greek politician from the Turkish minority of Western Thrace in northeastern Greece.

Mantatzi was born in Orfano, a village in the Topeiros municipality. He studied medicine at the Istanbul University and is employed as a cardiologist at the General Hospital of Xanthi. He is married to Fikret Gülsüm and has three children.

Mantatzi was first elected as municipal councilman in Topeiros in 2002 and was its mayor until 2004. He was re-elected at the municipal council in 2006.

Mantatzi was elected to the Greek Parliament for the Panhellenic Socialist Movement in 2007 and reelected in 2009. With another PASOK dissenter, he refused to support the Union government led by Lucas Papademos between PASOK, New Democracy and Popular Orthodox Rally in November 2011 because he was against the participation of far right party (Popular Orthodox Rally/LAOS) in the government. He was formally excluded from the PASOK in February 2012, along with 21 other MPs who had refused to vote a government memorandum on a new loan agreement. He then approached the Democratic Left of Fotis Kouvelis along with five other independent MPs, but in the end did not find an agreement with this party and did not stand in the May 2012 Greek legislative election.

For the January 2015 Greek legislative election he stood with George Papandreou's Movement of Democratic Socialists, and was not elected.
