= Burlington, Washington =

- City
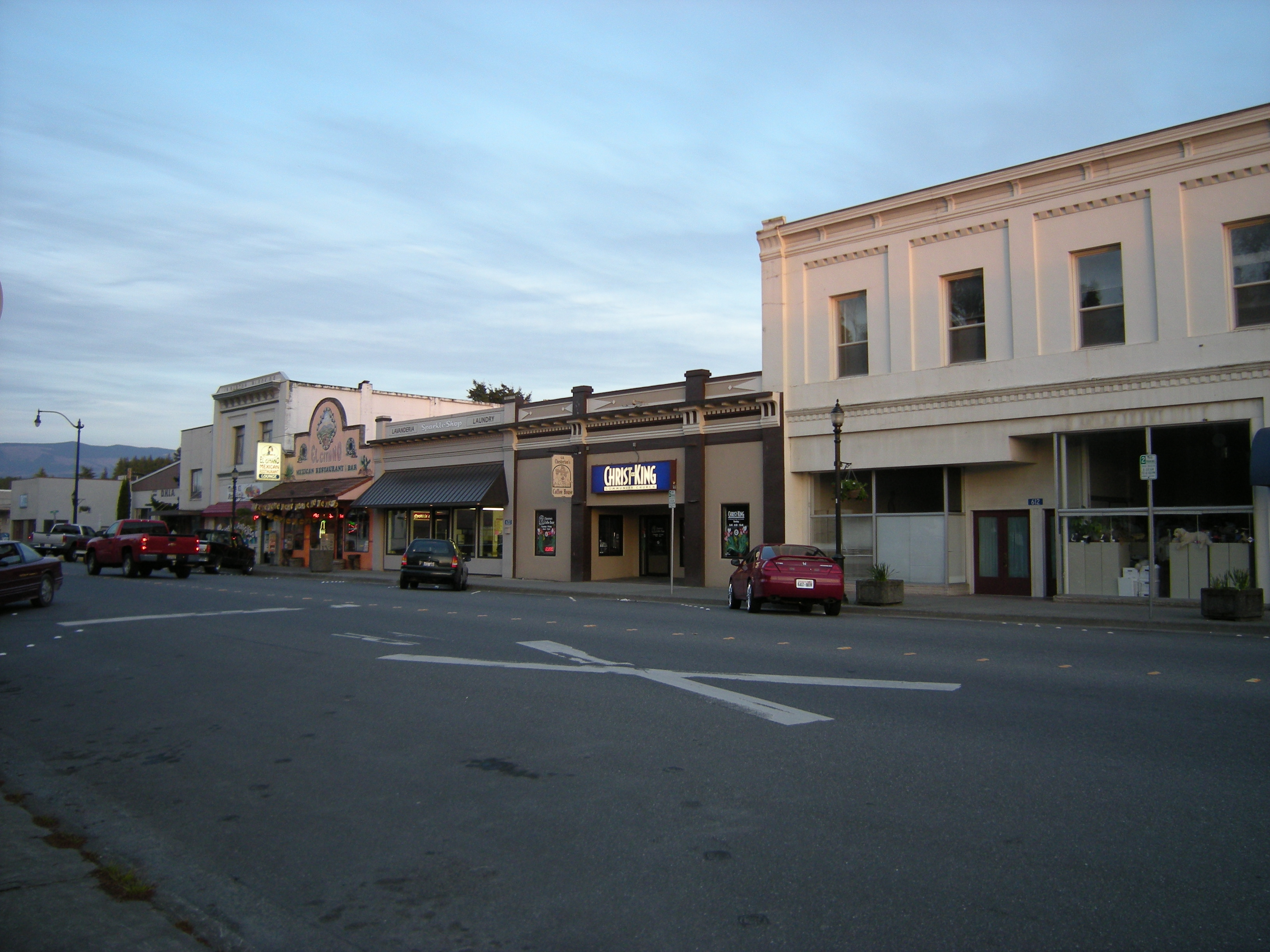
- Fairhaven Avenue in downtown Burlington
- Nickname: The Hub City
- Location of Burlington in Washington
- Coordinates: 48°28′19.49″N 122°19′41.69″W
- Country: United States
- State: Washington
- County: Skagit
- Incorporated: June 16, 1902

Government
  - Type: Mayor–council
  - Mayor: Bill Aslett

Area
  - Total: 4.44 sq mi (11.49 km^{2})
  - Land: 4.28 sq mi (11.08 km^{2})
  - Water: 0.16 sq mi (0.41 km^{2}) 3.62%
- Elevation: 30 ft (9.1 m)

Population (2020)
  - Total: 9,152
  - Estimate (2021): 9,224
  - Density: 2,138/sq mi (825.4/km^{2})
- Time zone: UTC-8 (PST)
  - Summer (DST): UTC-7 (PDT)
- ZIP code: 98233
- Area code: 360, 564
- FIPS code: 53-08920
- GNIS feature ID: 1512052
- Website: burlingtonwa.gov

Burlington is a city in Skagit County, Washington, United States. Its population was recorded as 9,152 in the 2020 census. Burlington is located approximately halfway between Seattle and Vancouver, Canada. The city is included in the Mount Vernon–Anacortes, Washington Metropolitan Statistical Area.

== History ==
Burlington began as a logging camp, established by John P. Millett and William McKay, in 1882. It was officially incorporated on June 16, 1902.

Originally, Burlington's businesses were centered on Fairhaven Avenue. Today, Fairhaven Avenue is the center of Burlington's old downtown, which has since been revitalized.

In 2007, the city opened a new library and city hall.

=== Indigent defense ruling ===
In December 2013, U.S. District Judge Robert Lasnik determined that Burlington had systematically violated its duty to offer effective legal representation to defendants who couldn't afford an attorney. The ruling required Burlington and Mount Vernon to hire a public defense supervisor to ensure their defense system complies with constitutional standards.

=== 2016 shooting ===
On September 24, 2016, five people were shot and killed at Cascade Mall in Burlington.

== Geography ==
According to the United States Census Bureau, the city has a total area of 4.42 square miles (11.45 km^{2}), of which 4.26 square miles (11.03 km^{2}) is land and 0.16 square miles (0.41 km^{2}) is water. The highest point in the city is Burlington Hill, which rises 450 feet (140 m) above sea level to the north of downtown. The city fire department placed a Christian cross atop the hill in the 1940s that would be lit for holidays; it was replaced by a permanently-lit and larger version in 1965 that was renovated in 2016.

=== Flooding ===
The Skagit River has a long history of flooding, which has affected Burlington as well as other communities in the Skagit Valley. A 1909 newspaper article describes how a dike broke upriver "and a mountain of water came rushing down the Skagit valley and quickly inundated [Burlington]". Burlington is protected by a system of dikes under the jurisdiction of Skagit County Dike District #12, which was originally incorporated in 1895.

== Demographics ==
Historical population
Census	Pop.	Note	%±
1910	1,302		—
1920	1,360		4.5%
1930	1,407		3.5%
1940	1,632		16.0%
1950	2,350		44.0%
1960	2,968		26.3%
1970	3,138		5.7%
1980	3,894		24.1%
1990	4,349		11.7%
2000	6,757		55.4%
2010	8,388		24.1%
2020	9,152		9.1%
2021 (est.)	9,702		6.0%
U.S. Decennial Census; 2018 Estimate

=== 2020 census ===
As of the 2020 census, Burlington had a population of 9,152. The median age was 35.1 years, with 24.1% of residents under the age of 18 and 17.0% aged 65 years or older. For every 100 females there were 96.0 males, and for every 100 females age 18 and over there were 92.4 males age 18 and over.

100.0% of residents lived in urban areas, while 0.0% lived in rural areas.

There were 3,438 households in Burlington, of which 34.2% had children under the age of 18 living in them. Of all households, 39.3% were married-couple households, 20.4% were households with a male householder and no spouse or partner present, and 29.7% were households with a female householder and no spouse or partner present. About 29.1% of all households were made up of individuals and 13.7% had someone living alone who was 65 years of age or older.

There were 3,645 housing units, of which 5.7% were vacant. The homeowner vacancy rate was 1.3% and the rental vacancy rate was 6.8%.

Racial composition as of the 2020 census
Race	Number	Percent
White	5,640	61.6%
Black or African American	116	1.3%
American Indian and Alaska Native	205	2.2%
Asian	255	2.8%
Native Hawaiian and Other Pacific Islander	38	0.4%
Some other race	1,664	18.2%
Two or more races	1,234	13.5%
Hispanic or Latino (of any race)	2,998	32.8%

=== 2010 census ===
As of the 2010 census, there were 8,388 people, 3,166 households, and 1,935 families living in the city. The population density was 1,969.0 inhabitants per square mile (760.2/km^{2}). There were 3,419 housing units at an average density of 802.6 per square mile (309.9/km^{2}). The racial makeup of the city was 72.1% White, 1.2% African American, 1.8% Native American, 3.0% Asian, 0.3% Pacific Islander, 17.9% from other races, and 3.6% from two or more races. Hispanic or Latino of any race were 31.4% of the population.

There were 3,166 households, of which 37.0% had children under the age of 18 living with them, 40.7% were married couples living together, 14.4% had a female householder with no husband present, 6.1% had a male householder with no wife present, and 38.9% were non-families. 30.2% of all households were made up of individuals, and 13.6% had someone living alone who was 65 years of age or older. The average household size was 2.62 and the average family size was 3.26.

The median age in the city was 32.1 years. 27.4% of residents were under the age of 18; 11.2% were between the ages of 18 and 24; 27.8% were from 25 to 44; 20.4% were from 45 to 64; and 13.2% were 65 years of age or older. The gender makeup of the city was 48.5% male and 51.5% female.

=== 2000 census ===
As of the 2000 census, there were 6,757 people, 2,398 households, and 1,585 families living in the city. The population density was 1,609.8 people per square mile (621.2/km^{2}). There were 2,531 housing units at an average density of 603.0 per square mile (232.7/km^{2}). The racial makeup of the city was 75.49% White, 0.83% African American, 1.10% Native American, 1.76% Asian, 0.18% Pacific Islander, 17.66% from other races, and 2.99% from two or more races. Hispanic or Latino of any race were 25.26% of the population.

There were 2,398 households, out of which 38.7% had children under the age of 18 living with them, 45.9% were married couples living together, 14.9% had a female householder with no husband present, and 33.9% were non-families. 25.6% of all households were made up of individuals, and 8.7% had someone living alone who was 65 years of age or older. The average household size was 2.74 and the average family size was 3.35.

In the city, the age distribution of the population shows 30.0% under the age of 18, 12.4% from 18 to 24, 30.9% from 25 to 44, 15.3% from 45 to 64, and 11.3% who were 65 years of age or older. The median age was 42 years. For every 100 females, there were 99 males. For every 100 females age 18 and over, there were 93.3 males.

The median income for a household in the city was $37,848, and the median income for a family was $42,083. Males had a median income of $35,247 versus $22,716 for females. The per capita income for the city was $17,167. About 11.7% of families and 14.9% of the population were below the poverty line, including 21.8% of those under age 18 and 16.8% of those age 65 or over.

== Economy ==
Burlington is home to Cascade Mall, a former shopping mall located in the heart of the Skagit Valley. It is an enclosed, single-level 585,362 sq ft (54,382 m^{2}). regional shopping center in Burlington, 60 miles (97 km) north of Seattle. Cascade Mall opened in the fall of 1989, at a time when the city of Burlington was credited by The Wall Street Journal as one of the fastest-growing and best investment opportunities among small towns in the United States. The mall is situated near the interchange of Interstate 5 and State Route 20. The mall is owned and managed by Merlone Geier and local management is headed by property manager Taylor Long. The mall permanently closed on June 30, 2020, due to the COVID-19 pandemic, though some stores on the outer perimeter were allowed to stay open.

== Events ==
The Burlington Chamber of Commerce hosts the annual "Berry Dairy Days" festival in June, which celebrates Burlington's agricultural history. The festival began in 1937 as the Strawberry Festival and originally served as a fundraiser for the town's fire department. It now features performances, craft booths, and fair food. The centerpiece of Berry Dairy Days is a parade on Fairhaven Avenue, the center of downtown Burlington.

== Notable people ==
- Lynn D. "Buck" Compton, soldier from the Easy Company (portrayed in the HBO miniseries Band of Brothers), police officer, and lawyer
- Mel Hein, American football player and coach inducted into Pro Football Hall of Fame
- Mary Mapes, journalist and television producer for 60 Minutes
- Fred Schacht, medical doctor and American football player and coach
- Charles F. Stafford, lawyer and Washington Supreme Court Justice
