= Anacortes, Washington =

- City
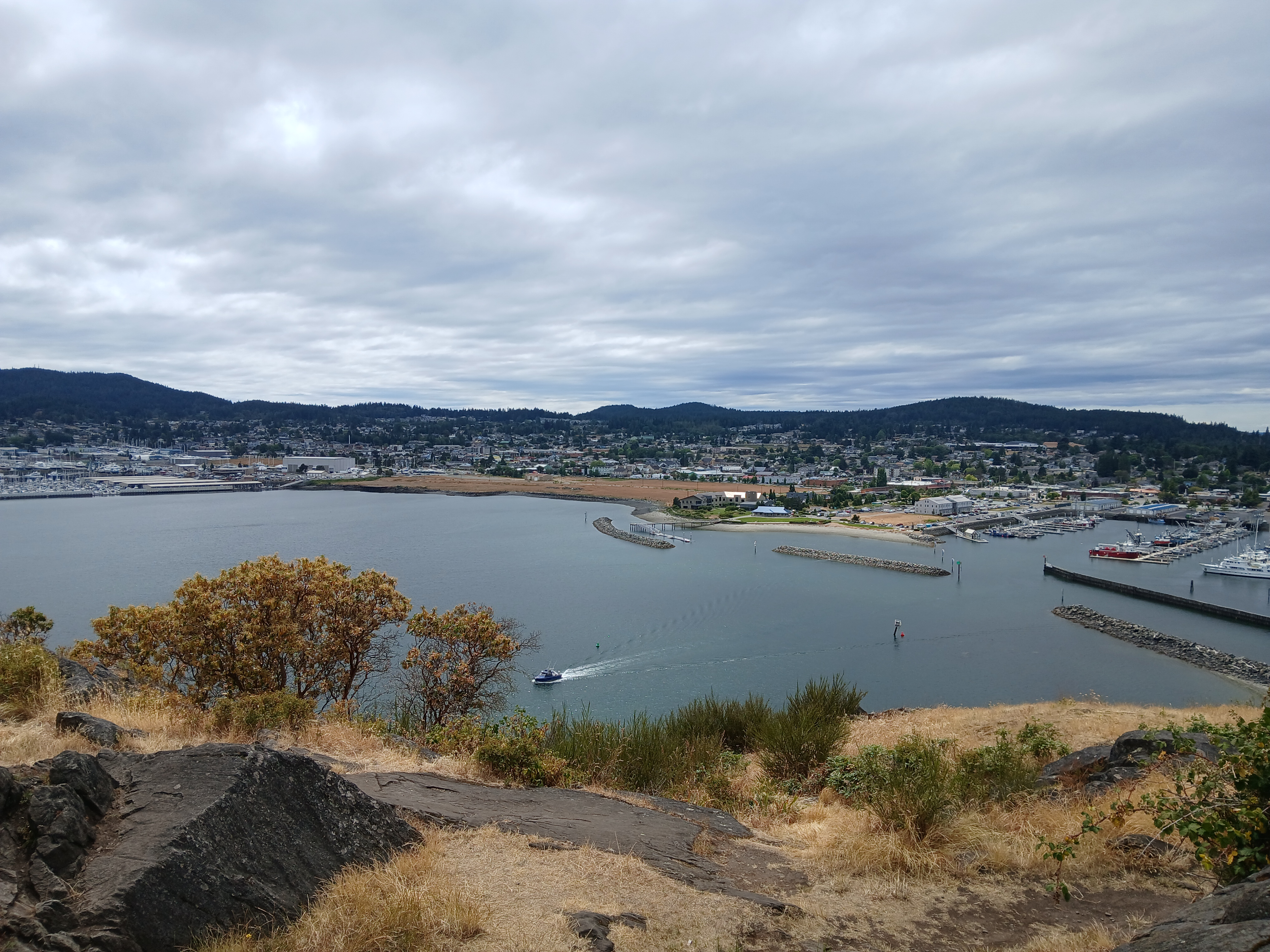
- Downtown Anacortes and the marina from Cap Sante

- Seal

- Coordinates: 48°30′07″N 122°37′25″W
- Country: United States
- State: Washington
- County: Skagit

Government
  - Type: Mayor–council
  - Mayor: Matt Miller

Area
  - Total: 15.65 sq mi (40.53 km^{2})
  - Land: 11.70 sq mi (30.30 km^{2})
  - Water: 3.95 sq mi (10.23 km^{2})
- Elevation: 246 ft (75 m)

Population (2020)
  - Total: 17,637
  - Estimate (2021): 17,832
  - Density: 1,498.2/sq mi (578.45/km^{2})
- Time zone: UTC-8 (PST)
  - Summer (DST): UTC-7 (PDT)
- ZIP Code: 98221
- Area code: 360, 564
- FIPS code: 53-01990
- GNIS feature ID: 2409702
- Website: www.anacorteswa.gov

Anacortes (/ˌænəˈkɔːrtəs/ AN-ə-KOR-təs) is a city in Skagit County, Washington, United States. The name "Anacortes" is an adaptation of the name of Anne Curtis Bowman, who was the wife of early Fidalgo Island settler Amos Bowman. Anacortes' population was 17,637 at the time of the 2020 census. It is one of two principal cities of and included in the Mount Vernon-Anacortes Metropolitan Statistical Area.

Anacortes is known for the Washington State Ferries dock and terminal serving Lopez Island, Shaw Island, Orcas Island, and San Juan Island. There is also a Skagit County-operated ferry that serves Guemes Island, a residential island located across Guemes Channel, north of Anacortes.

== History ==
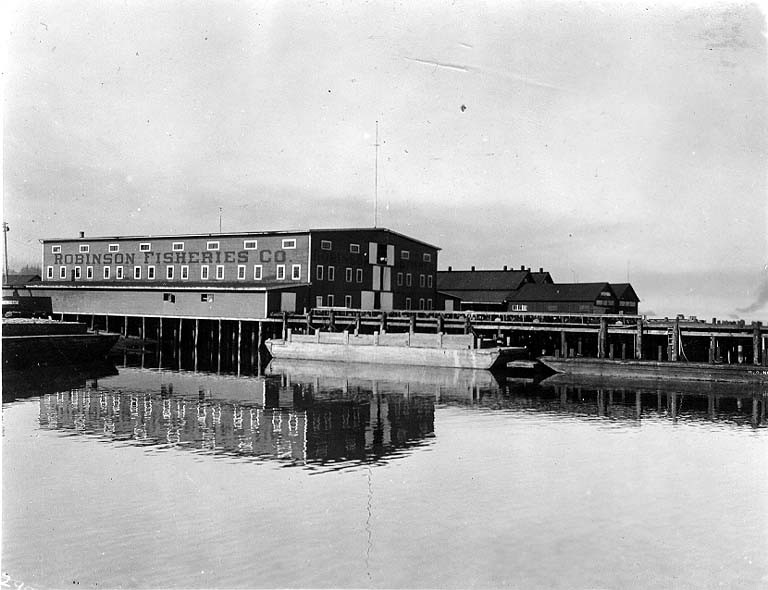
Robinson Fisheries Co. codfish plant

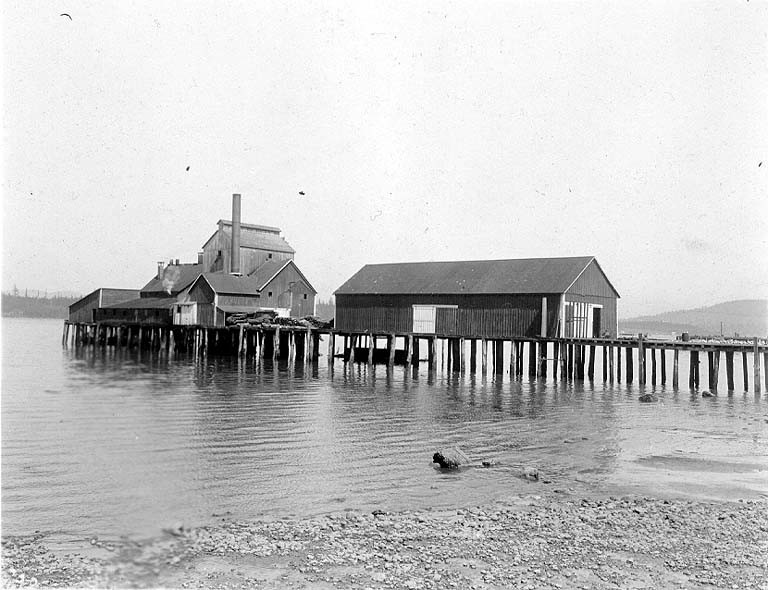
Robinson Fisheries Co. fertilizer plant

Anacortes is within the historical territory of the Samish people. Anacortes was officially incorporated on May 19, 1891.

In 1877, railroad surveyor and town founder Amos Bowman moved his family to the northern tip of Fidalgo Island. Bowman began promoting the area as an obvious terminus for the Northern Pacific Railway as it was built through the north Cascades to the Pacific. Bowman established the town's first newspaper, The Northwest Enterprise, to promote his vision of the New York of the West.

Seattle and Northern Company began building a rail line from the town in 1888. Real estate and development boomed from 1888 to 1890 as a result of the railroad rumors, and the Oregon Improvement Company posted $15 million in bonds to develop the town.

In 1891, the real estate bubble burst. Speculators lost money and the Oregon Improvement Company could no longer afford to complete tracks over the Cascades. The town failed to become the railroad terminus Bowman had envisioned.

A second newspaper, the Anacortes American was established in 1890, and digitized copies of its publication from inception through December 2000 are searchable at the Washington State Library's archives. In 1960, the paper's masthead showed it was an affiliate member of the National Editorial Association.

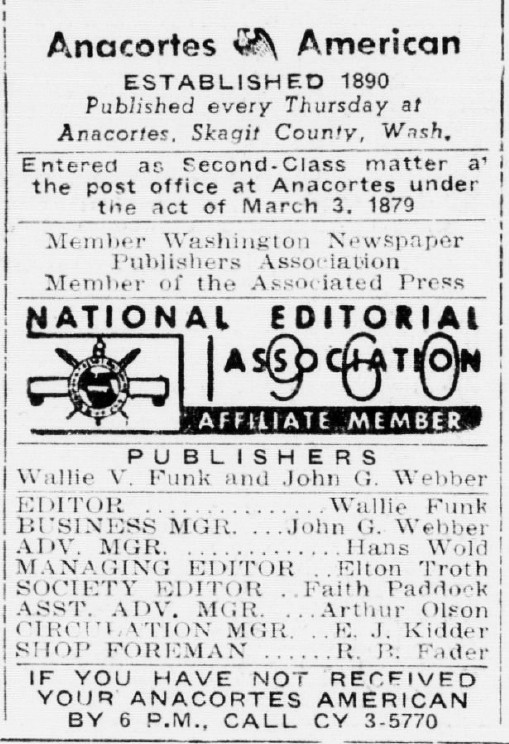
Anacortes American masthead in December 1960 shows national affiliation.

After the 1891 bust, the town became prominent for its fishing tradition, thriving canning industry, and timber mills.

== Geography ==
Anacortes is on Fidalgo Island. According to the United States Census Bureau, the city has a total area of 15.53 square miles (40.22 km^{2}), of which 11.75 square miles (30.43 km^{2}) is land and 3.78 square miles (9.79 km^{2}) is water.

The area around the city includes cliffs and bluffs with bedrock deposits that date to 160 million years before present. The landforms were shaped by a major glaciation event 15,000 years before present.

=== Climate ===
According to the Köppen climate classification system, Anacortes has a warm-summer Mediterranean climate (Csb) with cool, rainy winters and warm, dry summers.

Climate data for Anacortes
Month	Jan	Feb	Mar	Apr	May	Jun	Jul	Aug	Sep	Oct	Nov	Dec	Year
Record high °F (°C)	65 (18)	69 (21)	79 (26)	83 (28)	90 (32)	95 (35)	101 (38)	95 (35)	88 (31)	82 (28)	69 (21)	74 (23)	101 (38)
Mean daily maximum °F (°C)	45.1 (7.3)	48.6 (9.2)	52.4 (11.3)	57.8 (14.3)	63.6 (17.6)	68.2 (20.1)	72.2 (22.3)	72.2 (22.3)	67.5 (19.7)	59.2 (15.1)	51.0 (10.6)	46.3 (7.9)	58.7 (14.8)
Daily mean °F (°C)	39.8 (4.3)	42.3 (5.7)	45.3 (7.4)	49.7 (9.8)	54.7 (12.6)	58.9 (14.9)	62.0 (16.7)	62.0 (16.7)	58.5 (14.7)	51.9 (11.1)	45.2 (7.3)	41.2 (5.1)	51.0 (10.5)
Mean daily minimum °F (°C)	34.5 (1.4)	35.9 (2.2)	38.1 (3.4)	41.6 (5.3)	45.7 (7.6)	49.6 (9.8)	51.7 (10.9)	51.8 (11.0)	49.4 (9.7)	44.6 (7.0)	39.4 (4.1)	36.0 (2.2)	43.2 (6.2)
Record low °F (°C)	6 (−14)	9 (−13)	18 (−8)	27 (−3)	31 (−1)	33 (1)	35 (2)	33 (1)	19 (−7)	23 (−5)	10 (−12)	4 (−16)	4 (−16)
Average precipitation inches (mm)	3.56 (90)	2.48 (63)	2.31 (59)	1.83 (46)	1.57 (40)	1.37 (35)	0.8 (20)	1 (25)	1.53 (39)	2.64 (67)	3.84 (98)	3.79 (96)	26.73 (679)
Average snowfall inches (cm)	2.1 (5.3)	1.1 (2.8)	0.5 (1.3)	0 (0)	0 (0)	0 (0)	0 (0)	0 (0)	0 (0)	0 (0)	0.4 (1.0)	1 (2.5)	5.1 (13)
Average precipitation days	17	13	14	12	9	8	4	5	8	12	17	17	136

== Demographics ==
Historical population
Census	Pop.	Note	%±
1890	1,131		—
1900	1,476		30.5%
1910	4,168		182.4%
1920	5,284		26.8%
1930	6,564		24.2%
1940	5,875		−10.5%
1950	6,919		17.8%
1960	8,414		21.6%
1970	7,701		−8.5%
1980	9,013		17.0%
1990	11,451		27.0%
2000	14,557		27.1%
2010	15,778		8.4%
2020	17,637		11.8%
2021 (est.)	17,832		1.1%
U.S. Decennial Census; 2020 Census

=== 2020 census ===
As of the 2020 census, Anacortes had a population of 17,637. The median age was 50.7 years. 17.7% of residents were under the age of 18 and 31.2% of residents were 65 years of age or older. For every 100 females there were 91.9 males, and for every 100 females age 18 and over there were 89.6 males age 18 and over.

98.8% of residents lived in urban areas, while 1.2% lived in rural areas.

There were 7,826 households in Anacortes, of which 22.3% had children under the age of 18 living in them. Of all households, 52.1% were married-couple households, 15.0% were households with a male householder and no spouse or partner present, and 26.5% were households with a female householder and no spouse or partner present. About 29.0% of all households were made up of individuals and 17.0% had someone living alone who was 65 years of age or older. There were 8,395 housing units, of which 6.8% were vacant. The homeowner vacancy rate was 0.9% and the rental vacancy rate was 2.8%.

Racial composition as of the 2020 census
Race	Number	Percent
White	15,013	85.1%
Black or African American	100	0.6%
American Indian and Alaska Native	161	0.9%
Asian	419	2.4%
Native Hawaiian and Other Pacific Islander	42	0.2%
Some other race	374	2.1%
Two or more races	1,528	8.7%
Hispanic or Latino (of any race)	1,069	6.1%

=== 2010 census ===
As of the 2010 census, there were 15,778 people, 6,980 households, and 4,461 families residing in the city. The population density was 1,342.8 inhabitants per square mile (518.5/km^{2}). There were 7,680 housing units at an average density of 653.6 per square mile (252.4/km^{2}). The racial makeup of the city was 91.5% White, 0.7% African American, 1.0% Native American, 1.9% Asian, 0.1% Pacific Islander, 1.6% from other races, and 3.3% from two or more races. Hispanic or Latino of any race were 5.0% of the population.

There were 6,980 households, of which 24.3% had children under the age of 18 living with them, 51.5% were married couples living together, 9.0% had a female householder with no husband present, 3.5% had a male householder with no wife present, and 36.1% were non-families. 29.5% of all households were made up of individuals, and 14.3% had someone living alone who was 65 years of age or older. The average household size was 2.25 and the average family size was 2.75.

The median age in the city was 47.2 years. 19.6% of residents were under the age of 18; 6.3% were between the ages of 18 and 24; 21.4% were from 25 to 44; 29.9% were from 45 to 64; and 22.9% were 65 years of age or older. The gender makeup of the city was 47.9% male and 52.1% female.

== Description ==
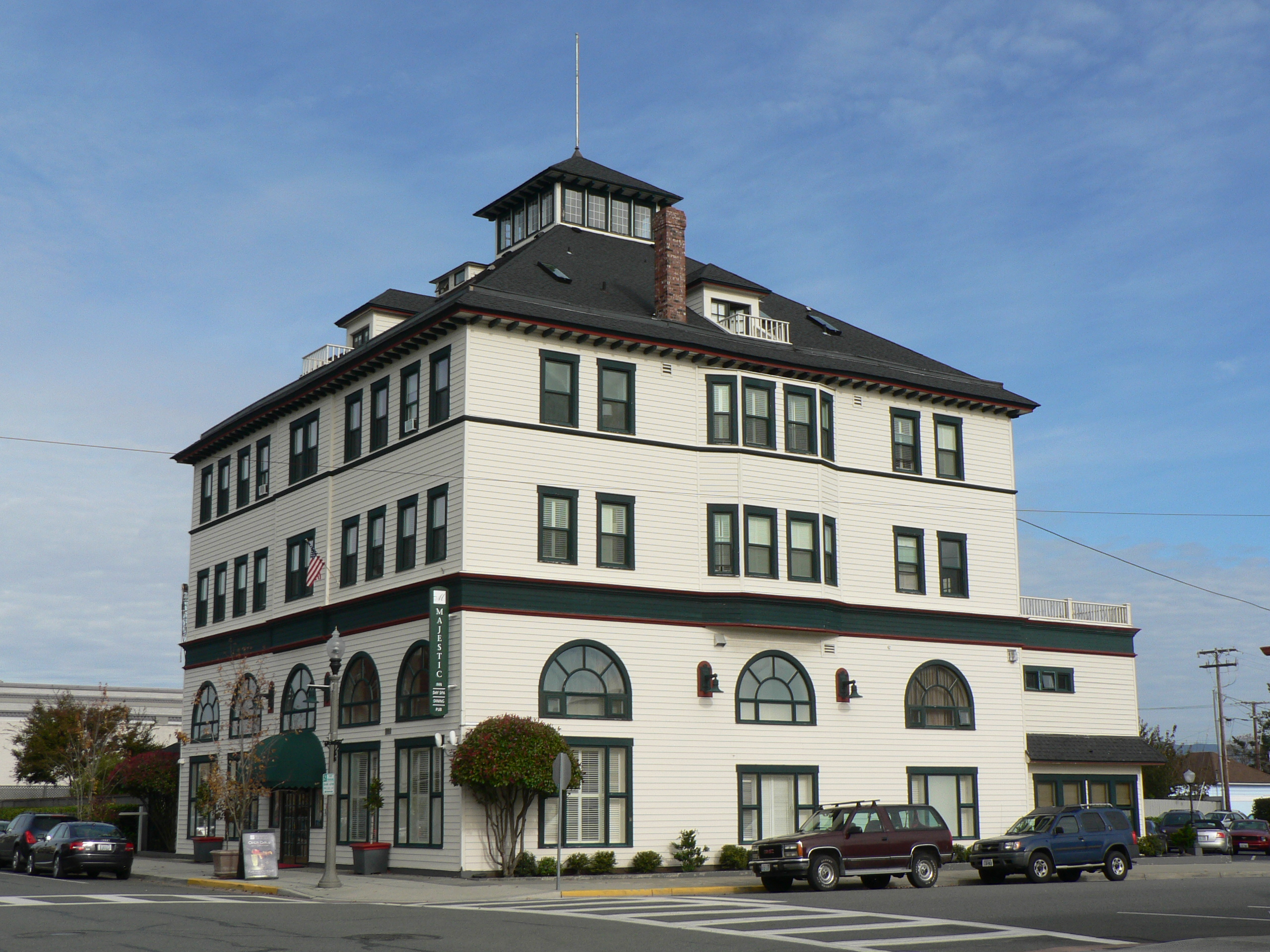
The Majestic Inn, Anacortes, Washington

Anacortes is on Fidalgo Island. Rosario Strait and the San Juan Islands are to the West while to the South, Deception Pass separates Fidalgo and Whidbey Islands. To the East, the Swinomish Channel separates Fidalgo Island from the mainland. The weather is milder than other areas of the Pacific Northwest, because it lies within the Olympic Mountain rain shadow. Fidalgo Island gets 21 inches of rain per year, only half as much as Seattle.

First known as Ship Harbor, Anacortes was established with a name and a post office in 1879 in the vain hope that it would be selected as the western terminus of the transcontinental railroad. The town was officially incorporated in 1891 shortly after the railroad bust, and became a lumber and fishing center.

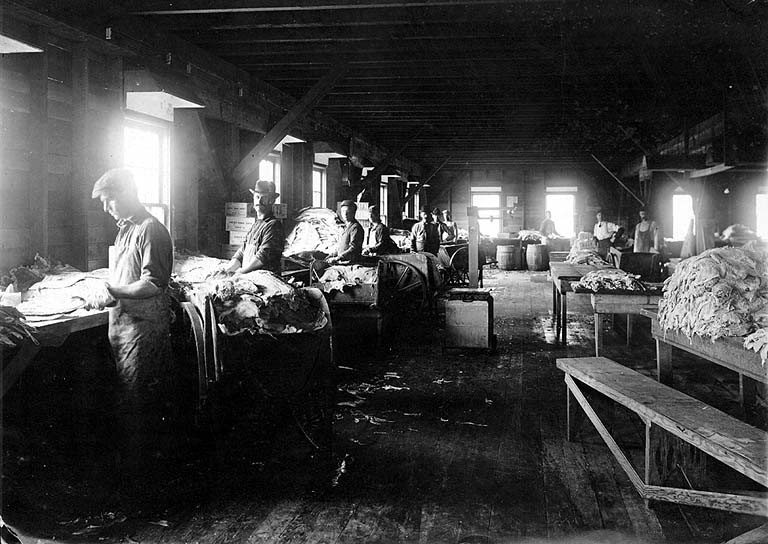
Workers at the Robinson Fisheries Co. skinning codfish in the Cutting and Skinning Department

In the 1950s, oil companies built big refineries near Anacortes. Two of the five refineries operating in Washington are located near the town. One is owned and operated by Marathon Petroleum (opened in 1955, it was originally built and owned by Shell Oil and later operated by Andeavor [formerly Tesoro]), operating as the Marathon Anacortes Refinery, the other was owned and operated by Shell Puget Sound Refinery Company (opening in 1957, and originally built and owned by Texaco). However, HollyFrontier has now bought the refinery. Refining remains the area's largest industry, but the economic base now includes yacht construction/shipbuilding, tourism.

== Government ==
Anacortes has a mayor–council government with an elected mayor and seven city councilmembers, of whom three are elected from single member wards. The remaining four are elected at-large.

The city government operates a municipal broadband system that began operation as a pilot in late 2019 and will expand to the entire city in 2023.

== Education ==
The city is served by the Anacortes School District.

There is a support organization called the Northwest Educational School District 189, based in Anacortes.

== Recreation and tourism ==
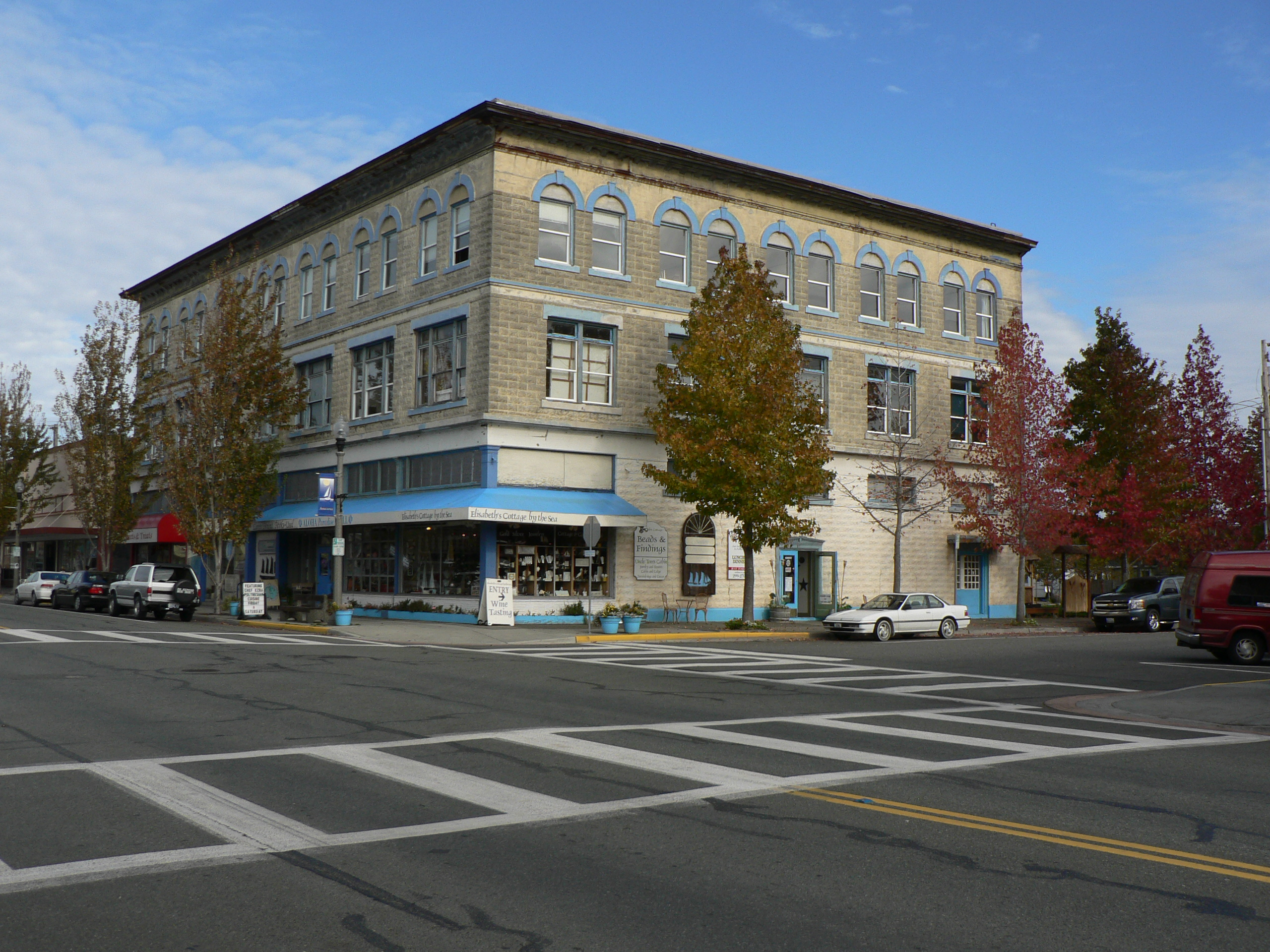
The 619 Commercial Avenue building

Anacortes is a popular destination for boaters and those traveling on to the San Juan Islands. The city maintains a 220-acre (0.89 km^{2}) city park on the northwestern end of Fidalgo Island named "Washington Park". This park features camping, boat launching, and views of the San Juan Islands. The most prominent view is of Cypress Island. As a result of Anacortes' proximity to the Strait of Juan de Fuca, the area provides opportunities for whale-watching. The waters off of Anacortes and Fidalgo Island are home to several varieties of marine life, including three resident Orca pods.

Anacortes Community Forest Lands, 2,800 acres (11 km^{2}) with 50 miles (80 km) of mountain biking and hiking trails, are a valuable amenity in a city the size of Anacortes. In adjacent Mount Erie Park, a number of rock climbing routes are popular on the cliffs of the south and west faces of Mount Erie. Mount Erie offers scenic vistas from its 1273-foot peak.

Two accessible walking trails follow the shoreline in Anacortes. The Tommy Thompson Trail connects 22nd Street to the refineries, featuring maritime buildings, light forests, and beaches. The Guemes Trail connects the La Merced Breakwater to the ferry landing with island views, sandy beaches, paved sections, and a boardwalk through a small nature preserve. The City of Anacortes plans to connect these two trails, and as of 2026 is planning the route.

Anacortes hosts many long-distance cyclists, as it is the western terminus of the Adventure Cycling Association's Northern Tier cross-country bicycle route, which ends in Bar Harbor, Maine.

== Festivals and celebrations ==
- "Shipwreck Day" is a single-day, flea market/town garage sale event held annually on the 3rd Saturday in July. City management accommodates the occasion by blocking off several downtown streets.
- What the Heck Fest was an annual festival coinciding with Shipwreck Day. It began in 2001 and held its last festival in 2019. The festival took place at various locations in Anacortes a week in the middle of July. Performers presented music, movies, literature, and art. The thematic center of the festival is the dinner show that includes a full meal along with the concert, an actual community event.
- The first weekend of August hosts the Anacortes Arts Festival. Started in 1962 as the result of the efforts of a group of community arts patrons, the festival is held in the midst of blocked-off downtown main street areas. Vendors, merchants, and artisans present their wares in covered booths while jazz and blues musicians are showcased on four different stages.
- The Oyster Run is an annual one day motorcycle rally held on the fourth Sunday of September. Beginning in 1981, the event has grown into the largest rally in the Pacific Northwest, with an estimated motorcycle count of 15000 bikes, and growing in numbers each year.
- The Anacortes Farmers Market began in 1989 and occurs every Saturday from May to October, with a special holiday market the weekend before Thanksgiving and monthly winter markets from January to April.

== Notable people ==
- William Anders – astronaut, Apollo 8
- Jake Anderson – Fisherman and television personality featured on Deadliest Catch
- Michael Arrington – Entrepreneur and blogger, founder of TechCrunch
- Richard Bach – writer
- Craig Bartlett – animator
- Duane Berentson – educator, businessman, politician
- Karl Blau – indie rock and folk musician
- Phil Elverum – independent musician
- Bret Lunsford - independent musician, current director of the Anacortes History Museum
- Donald Hume – Olympic rower and gold medalist at the 1936 Berlin Olympics
- Burl Ives – folk singer, author, and actor
- Rien Long – former NFL defensive lineman
- The Lonely Forest – indie rock band
- William Cameron McCool – NASA astronaut and Space Shuttle Columbia pilot
- Kathi McDonald – blues and rock singer
- James K. Okubo – Medal of Honor recipient
- Eddie Roberts – Boxer, actor and seaman
- Charley Schanz – former Major League Baseball pitcher
- Harry Everett Smith – music anthologist, experimental film maker
- Lowell Wakefield – founder of Wakefield Seafoods

== Sister cities ==
Anacortes' sister cities are:

- Comarnic, Romania
- Lomonosov, Russia
- Nikaho, Japan
- Sidney, Canada
- Vela Luka, Croatia

Following Russia's full-scale invasion of Ukraine in February 2022, the Anacortes City Council voted to remove the Russian flag from its Sister Cities memorials along Washington state Highway 20.

== See also ==
- The Tempestry Project
