= Turks in Europe =

Ethnic group

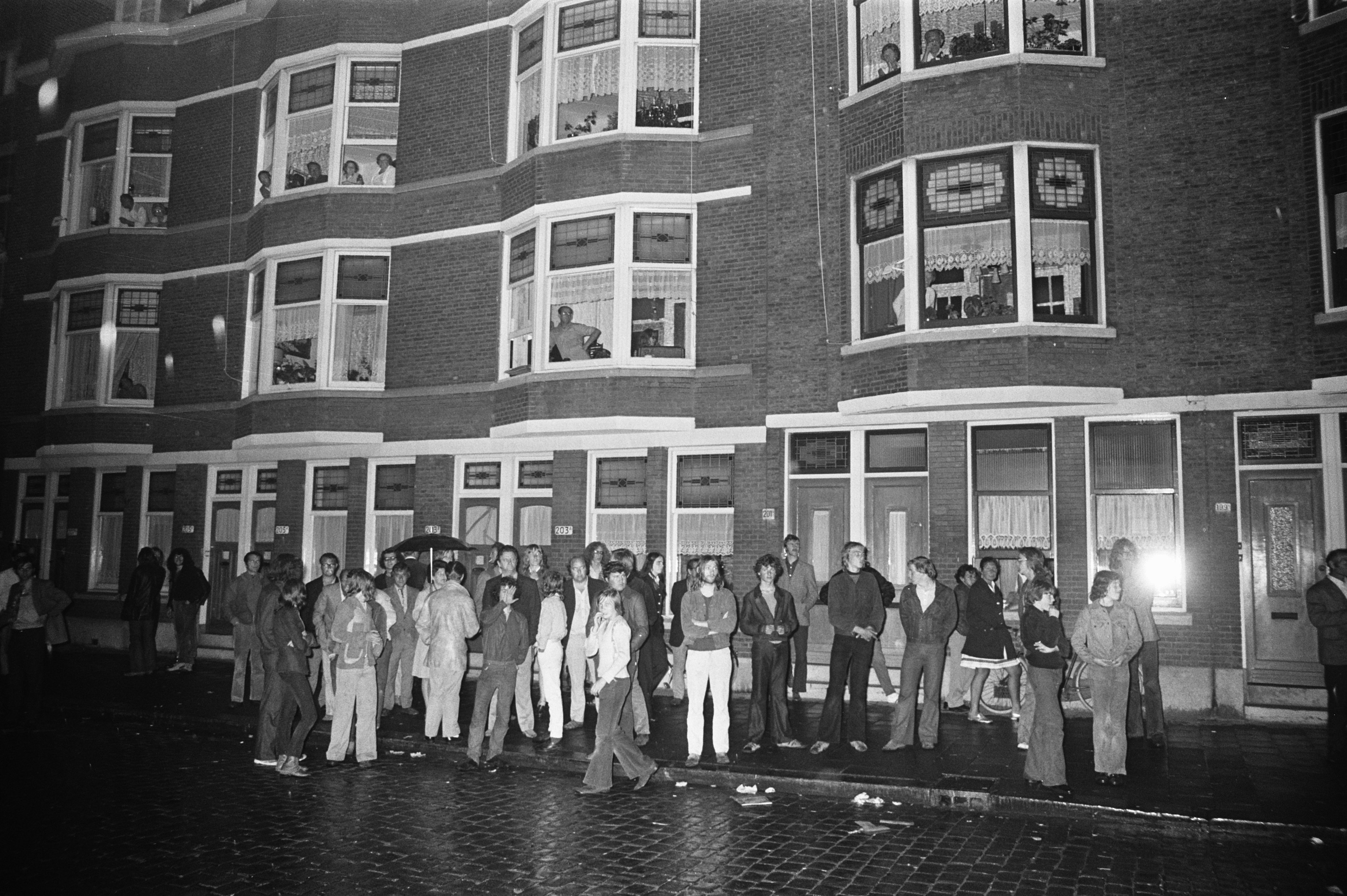
Turkish workers' block of flats in Rotterdam, Netherlands, 1972

The Turks in Europe (sometimes called Euro-Turks; Turkish: Avrupa'daki Türkler or Avrupa'da yaşayan Türkler or Avrupa Türkleri) refers to Turkish people living in Europe.

Generally, "Euro-Turks" refers to the large Turkish diasporas within Europe. When the term "Euro-Turks" is taken in its most literal sense, Turkish people living in the European portion of Turkey are also included in the term. Even more broadly, the Turkish Cypriot community for people living in Cyprus, which is located in Asia, has also been defined under the term "Euro-Turks" since the island joined the European Union.

It is less frequently applied to Turkic groups speaking a variety of Turkic languages that have lived in Europe before the Ottoman conquest, such as the Gagauz, Crimean Karaites and Urum Greeks, the Krymchaks, and the Dobrujan Tatars.

Turks have had a long history in Europe, dating back to when the Ottoman Empire began to conquer and migrate during the establishment of Ottoman territories in Europe ("Rumelia"), which created significant Turkish communities in Bulgaria (Bulgarian Turks), Greece (Cretan Turks, Dodecanese Turks and Western Thrace Turks), North Macedonia (Turks in North Macedonia), Kosovo (Kosovan Turks), Romania (Romanian Turks), Hungary (Hungarian Turks), Bosnia and Herzegovina (Bosnian Turks) and Serbia (Turks in Serbia).

In the first half of the 20th century, immigration of Turks to Western Europe began with Turkish Cypriots migrating to the United Kingdom in the early 1910s, when the British Empire annexed Cyprus in 1914 and the residents of Cyprus became British subjects. However, Turkish Cypriot migration increased significantly in the 1940s and 1950s due to the Cyprus conflict. Similarly, Turkish Algerians and Turkish Tunisians mainly emigrated to France after Algeria and Tunisia came under French colonial rule. Conversely, in 1944, Turks who were forcefully deported from Meskheti in Georgia during the World War II settled in other parts of the Soviet Union, especially in Azerbaijan, Kazakhstan, Russia, and Ukraine.

In the second half of the 20th century, Turkish migration from Turkey to Western and Northern Europe increased significantly when in 1961 Turkish "Gastarbeiter" began to arrive under a "Labour Export Agreement" with West Germany, followed in 1964 by similar agreements with the Netherlands, Belgium, and Austria; France in 1965; and Sweden in 1967. Furthermore, many Balkan Turks also arrived in these countries under similar labour agreements, thus, since the 1960s there has also been a substantial Turkish Macedonian community in Sweden; Turkish Bulgarian and Turkish Western Thracian communities in Germany, etc.

More recently, in the 21st century, Turkish Bulgarians, Turkish Cypriots, Turkish Western Thracians, and Turkish Romanians have used their right as EU nationals to migrate throughout Western Europe. Furthermore, Iraqi and Syrian Turkmen have come to Europe mostly as refugees since the Iraq and Syrian civil war – especially since the 2015 European migrant crisis.

== History ==
As early as the 13th century Turkic slaves (Oghuz and Kipchak Mameluks), from Central Asia and the Pontic Steppe, had been sold to Northern Italian city states by Arab traders. Some of the slaves were bought free and mixed in with the local Italian population.

=== Ottoman migration ===
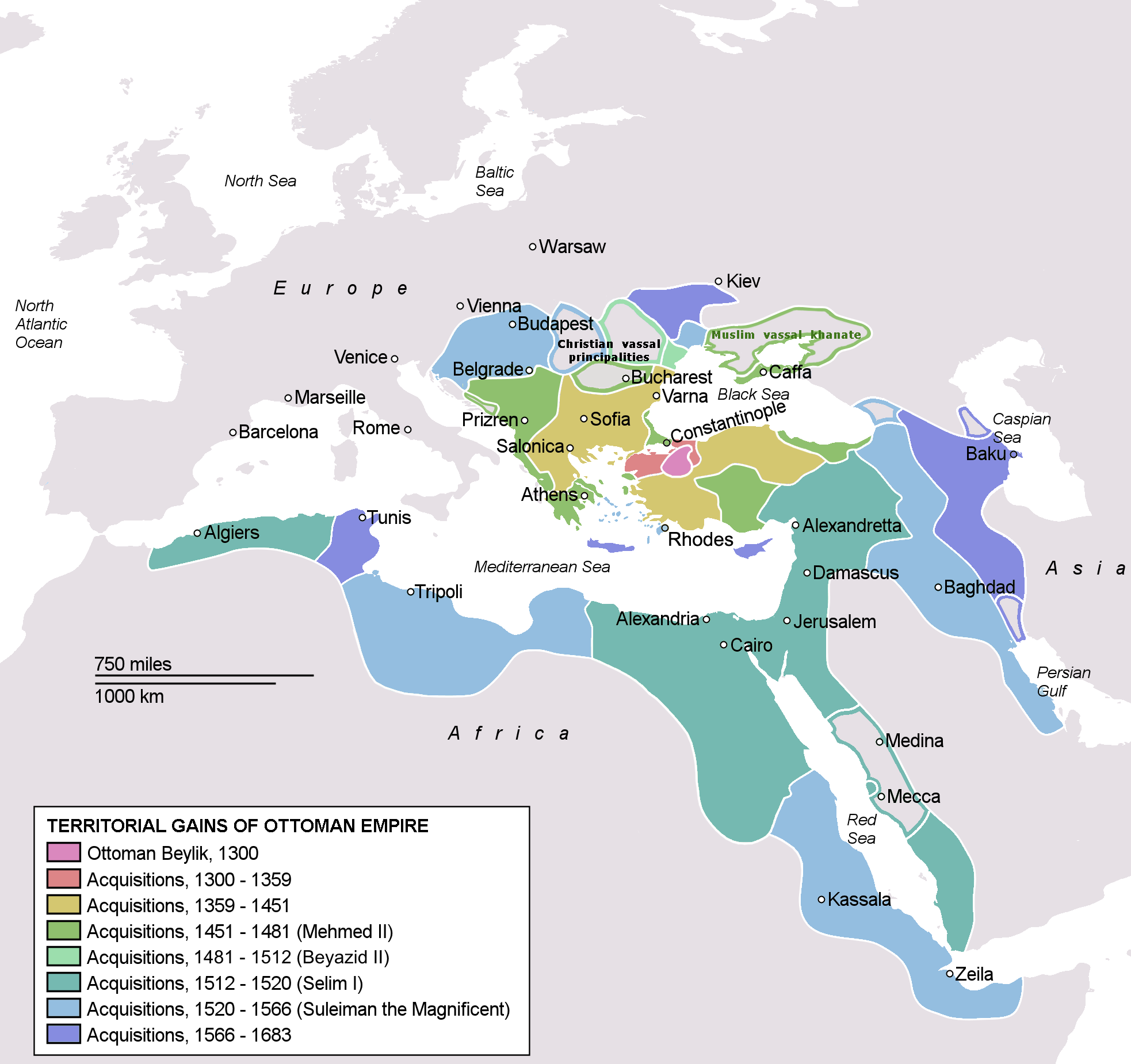
Ottoman Turks migrated to various parts of Europe during the rule of the Ottoman Empire; thus, large communities have been formed due to Turkish colonisation, especially in Bulgaria, the island of Cyprus, Georgia (especially in Meskheti), Greece (mainly in Western Thrace), Kosovo, North Macedonia, and Romania.

During the rule of the Ottoman Empire (1299–1923), Turkish settlers began to move into territories in Europe as part of the Turkish expansion. Because these communities migrated to these countries during the Ottoman rule, they are not considered part of the modern Turkish diaspora. However, these populations, which have different nationalities, still share the same ethnic, linguistic, cultural and religious origins as today's Turkish nationals.

==== Balkan Turks ====
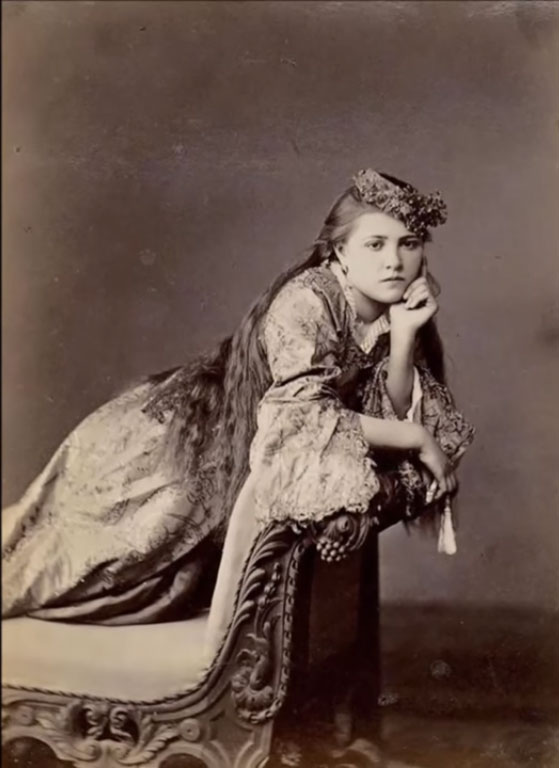
A Turkish woman from Thessaloniki, 1917

The conquest of the Balkans by the Ottomans set in motion important population movements of Turks brought over from Anatolia to Rumelia, establishing a firm Turkish base for further conquests in Europe. Thus, the Ottomans used colonization as a very effective method to consolidate their position and power in the Balkans. The colonizers that were brought to the Balkans consisted of soldiers, nomads, farmers, artisans and merchants, dervishes, preachers and other religious functionaries, and administrative personnel. Densely populated Turkish colonies were established in the frontier regions of Thrace in the valleys of the Maritsa and Tundzha. In addition to voluntary migrations, throughout the fourteenth, fifteenth, and sixteenth centuries, the Ottoman authorities also used mass deportations (Ottoman Turkish: سوركون, romanized: sürgün, lit. 'banishment, exile') as a method of control over potentially rebellious individuals.

One of the greatest impacts of the Ottoman colonization process of the Balkans was felt in the urban centres, many towns became major centres for Turkish control and administration, with most Christians gradually withdrawing to the mountains. The Ottomans embarked on creating new towns and repopulating older towns that had suffered significant population decline and economic dislocation during the wars preceding the Ottoman conquests. Major Balkan towns, especially those on or near transportation and communication routes, were the focal point of Ottoman colonization in the Balkans. Most urban centres in the Balkans, especially in Thrace, Macedonia, Thessaly, and Moesia, achieved Muslim/Turkish majorities or substantial minorities soon after the completion of the conquest and remained overwhelmingly Muslim in composition into the eighteenth century, and in some areas such as Macedonia and Bulgaria well into the nineteenth century.

However, in the course of the nineteenth and twentieth centuries, many Turks were displaced and ethnically cleansed, most of them fleeing to Anatolia and East Thrace. At present, there are still significant Turkish minorities living in Bulgaria, the province of East Macedonia and Thrace in Northern Greece, Kosovo, North Macedonia, and Romania.

==== Meskhetian Turks ====
The Meskhetian Turks, also known as Ahiska Turks, reside or used to reside in Meskheti, which is in the southwestern region of Georgia. The region came under Ottoman rule in the sixteenth century up until 1829. Today, approximately 600 to 1000 Meskhetian Turks are still living in Georgia. The population drastically decreased in 1944, when Joseph Stalin deported approximately 100,000 of these Turks to Eastern Europe and Central Asia.

==== Turkish Cypriots ====
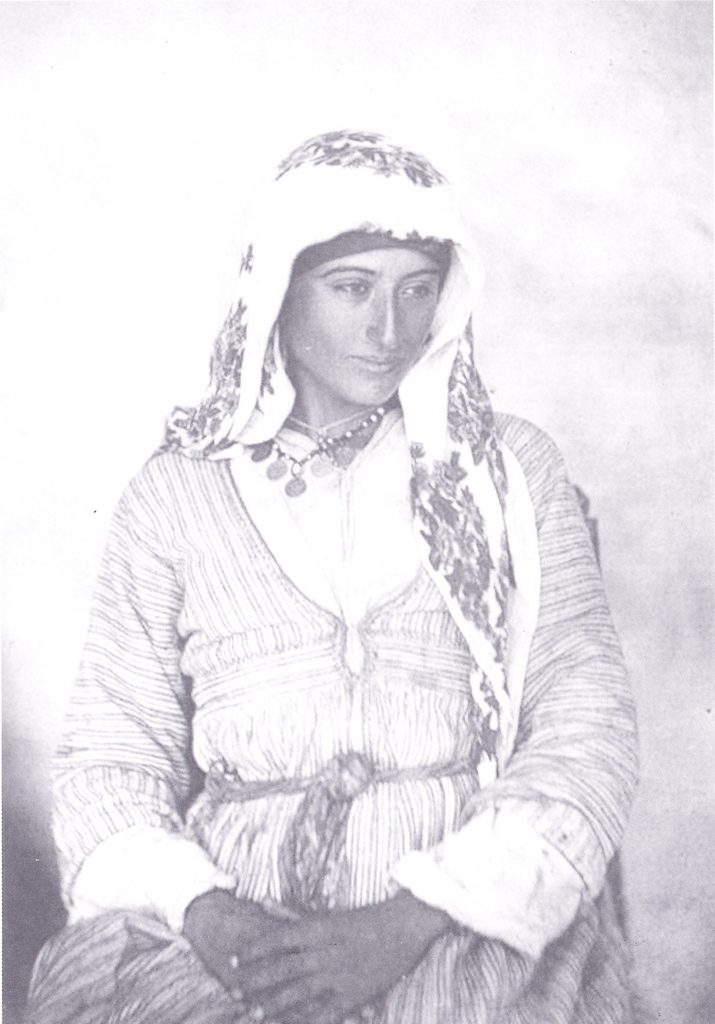
A Turkish Cypriot woman in 1878.

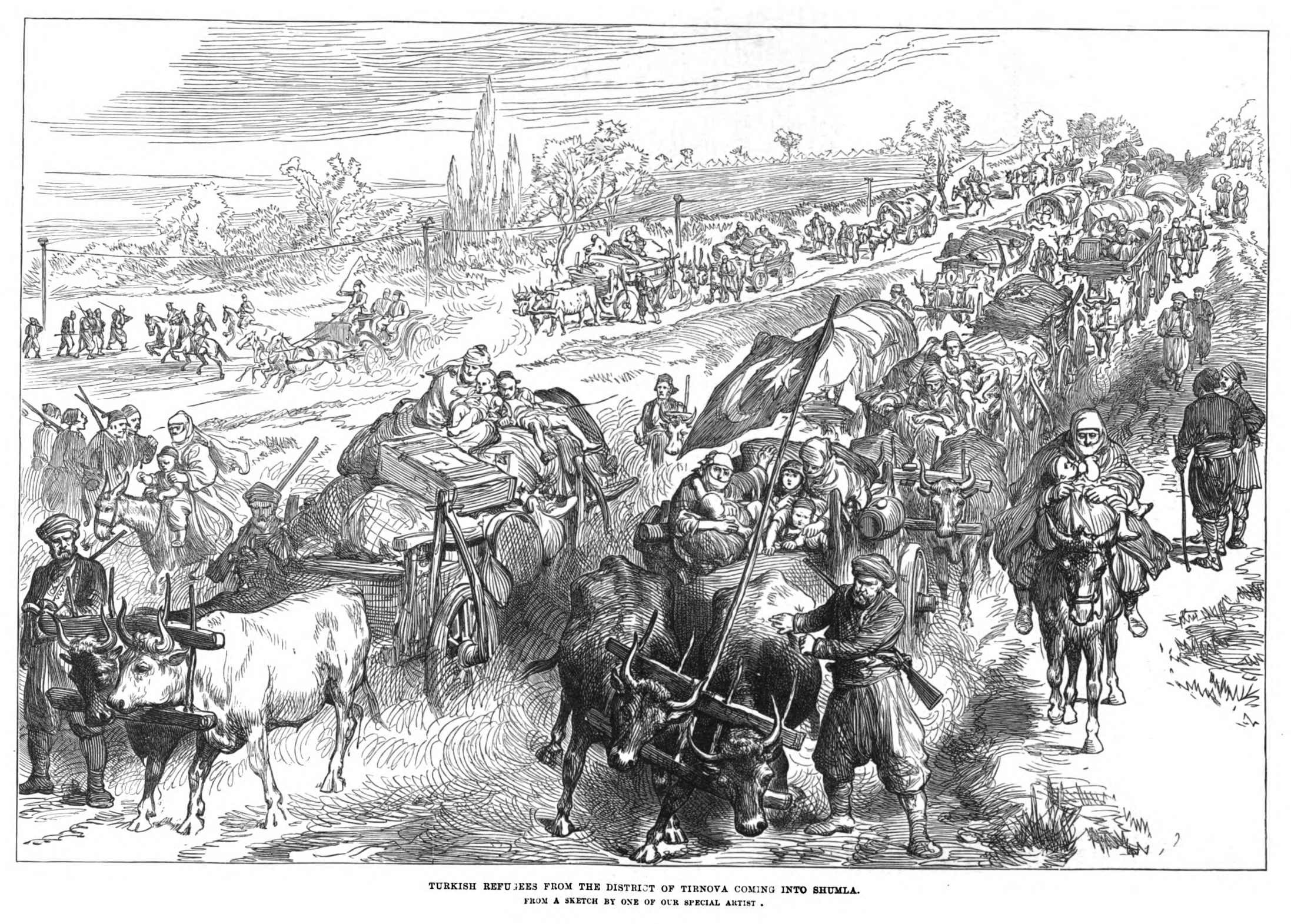
Bulgarian Turks from Tirnova as refugees in 1877.

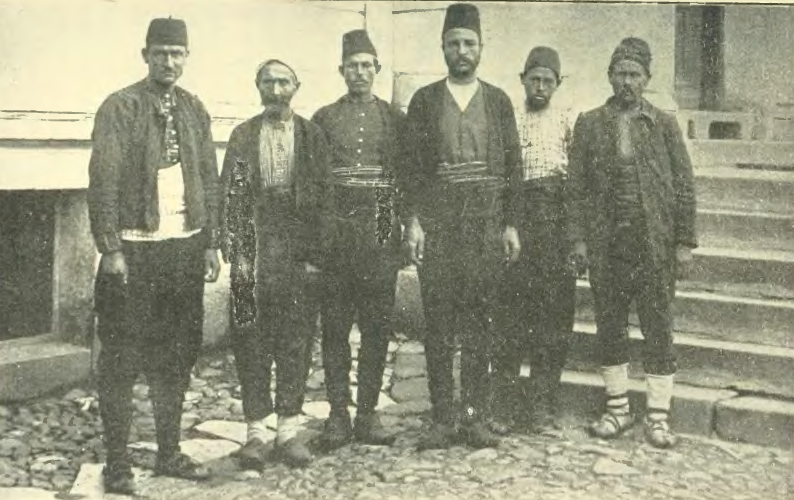
Macedonian Turks in 1914.

The Ottoman Turks conquered Cyprus in 1571 when they began a campaign which led to the fall of Nicosia in September 1570 and of Famagusta in August 1571. By 1571, about 30,000 Turkish settlers, which included soldiers who were involved in the conquest and their families, or agricultural colonizers, particularly from Konya, were given land on the island. Additionally, many of the islanders converted to Islam during the early years of Ottoman rule due to significant advantages to being Muslim (i.e. taxation). Thus, a strong Turkish element was formed in Cyprus' population, which was later reinforced by immigration from Asia Minor.

==== Turkish Roma ====
With the expansion of the Ottoman Empire, Turkish-speaking Muslim Roma settled in Rumelia (southeastern Europe) under Ottoman rule. The Ottoman Archives of the 18th century and 19th century told from so-called Türkmen Kıpti (تركمن قِبْطِيّ, who spoke Turkish only with few Romani words, as a separate group from other Roma in Rumelia. Turkish Roma have adopted the Turkish language to establish a Turkish identity and to be more recognized by their host population. The majority Turkish-speaking Muslim Roma in Bulgaria, Dobruja-Romania, Western Thrace-Greece, Northern Cyprus and Turkey declare themselves to be Turks, not Romani people. Gene flow from the Ottoman Turks spilled over in the Balkan Roma and established a higher frequency of the human Y-chromosome DNA haplogroups J and E-M215 Horahane means Turks (term for Muslims) in Romani language.

Some Turkish citizens who came as Gastarbeiter from Turkey to Europe have Roma backgrounds and are fully assimilated into Turkish European communities. The second wave of Turkish Roma to Western Europe began when Bulgaria and Romania became a member of the EU; many Turkish Roma from Bulgaria and Romania (Dobruja) went to Western Europe.

==== Early Western European Turks as traders in Western Europe ====
At least from the 16th century onwards Ottoman traders settled in western European trading capitals such as Antwerp, Amsterdam and London. Turkish traders in the Netherlands had at least two mosques in Amsterdam in the early 17th century.

=== Modern migration ===
According to an estimate in the European Union there are 3,7 million ethnic Turks.

==== Turkish Cypriot migration to Great Britain (1920s-present) ====
Turkish Cypriots started to immigrate from Cyprus to the United Kingdom in the early 1910s when the British Empire annexed Cyprus in 1914 and the residents of Cyprus became subjects of the Crown. Many Turkish Cypriots went to the United Kingdom as students and tourists whilst others left the island due to the harsh economic and political life during the British Colony of Cyprus. Emigration to the United Kingdom continued to increase when the Great Depression of 1929 brought economic depression to Cyprus, with unemployment and low wages being a significant issue. During the Second World War, the number of Turkish run businesses increased which created a demand for more Turkish Cypriot workers. Thus, throughout the 1950s, Turkish Cypriots emigrated to the United Kingdom for economic reasons and by 1958 the number of Turkish Cypriots was estimated to be 8,500. Their numbers increased each year as rumours about immigration restrictions appeared in much of the Cypriot media.

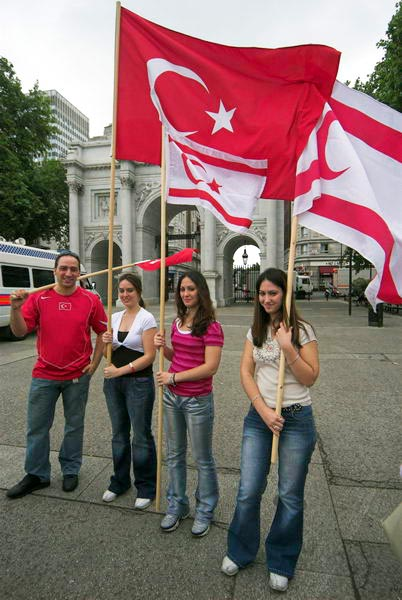
There are about 300,000 to 350,000 Turkish Cypriots, out of a total of 500,000 British Turks, living in the United Kingdom.

Furthermore, the 1950s saw the arrival of many more Turkish Cypriots to the United Kingdom who felt vulnerable as they had cause for concern about the political future of the island. This was first evident when the Greek Cypriots held a referendum in 1950 in which 95.7% of eligible Greek Cypriot voters cast their ballots in supporting a fight aimed at uniting Cyprus with Greece. Hence, Turkish Cypriots fled to the United Kingdom due to the EOKA terrorists and its aim of Enosis. By the 1960s, inter-ethnic fighting broke out and by 1964 some 25,000 Turkish Cypriots became internally displaced, accounting to about a fifth of their population; furthermore, approximately 60,000 Turkish Cypriots were forcefully moved into Turkish Cypriot enclaves within Cyprus. This period in Cypriot history resulted in an exodus of more Turkish Cypriots to the United Kingdom. Other reasons for the continued migration to the United Kingdom was because of the economic gap which was widening in Cyprus. The Greek Cypriots were increasingly taking control of the country's major institutions causing the Turkish Cypriots to become economically disadvantaged. Thus, the political and economic unrest in Cyprus after 1964 sharply increased the number of Turkish Cypriot immigrants to the United Kingdom. Many of these early migrants worked in the clothing industry in London, where both men and women could work together- sewing was a skill which the community had already acquired in Cyprus. Turkish Cypriots were concentrated mainly in the north-east of London and specialised in the heavy-wear sector, such as coats and tailored garments. This sector offered work opportunities where poor knowledge of the English language was not a problem and where self-employment was a possibility.

Once the Greek military junta rose to power in 1967, Greece staged a coup d'état in 1974 against the Cypriot President, with the help of EOKA B, to unite the island with Greece. This led to a military offensive by Turkey who invaded the island. By 1983, the Turkish Cypriots declared their own state, the Turkish Republic of Northern Cyprus (TRNC), which has since remained internationally unrecognised except by Turkey. The division of the island led to an economic embargo against the Turkish Cypriots by the Greek Cypriot controlled Government of Cyprus. This had the effect of depriving the Turkish Cypriots of foreign investment, aid and export markets; thus, it caused the Turkish Cypriot economy to remain stagnant and undeveloped. Due to these economic and political issues, an estimated 130,000 Turkish Cypriots have emigrated from Northern Cyprus since its establishment to the United Kingdom. In 2011, the House of Commons, Home Affairs Committee suggested that there are now about 300,000 Turkish Cypriots living in the UK.

==== Turkish Meskhetian migration within Eastern Europe (1944–present) ====
The Meskhetian Turks, originally living in Meskheti (now known as Samtskhe-Javakheti) which is a part of southern Georgia, are widely dispersed throughout the former Soviet Union (150,000 live in Kazakhstan, 90,000–110,000 in Azerbaijan, 70,000–90,000 in Russia, 50,000 in Kyrgyzstan, 15,000 in Uzbekistan and 10,000 in Ukraine) as a result of forced deportations and discrimination which began in 1944. During World War II, the Soviet Union was preparing to launch a pressure campaign against Turkey and Vyacheslav Molotov, then Minister of Foreign Affairs, formally presented a demand to the Turkish Ambassador in Moscow for the surrender of three Anatolian provinces (Kars, Ardahan and Artvin); thus, war against Turkey seemed possible, and Joseph Stalin wanted to clear the strategic Turkish population (especially those situated in Meskheti) located near the Turkish-Georgian border which were likely to be hostile to Soviet intentions.

In 1944, the Meskhetian Turks were forcefully deported from Meskheti in Georgia and accused of smuggling, banditry and espionage in collaboration with their kin across the Turkish border. Nationalistic policies at the time encouraged the slogan: "Georgia for Georgians" and that the Meskhetian Turks should be sent to Turkey "where they belong". Joseph Stalin deported the Meskhetian Turks to Central Asia (especially to Uzbekistan and Kazakhstan), thousands dying en route in cattle-trucks, and were not permitted by the Georgian government of Zviad Gamsakhurdia to return to their homeland.

In the late 1970s, the Stavropol and Krasnodar authorities in Russia visited various regions of Uzbekistan to invite and recruit Meskhetian Turks to work in agriculture enterprises in southern Russia. By 1985, Moscow issued a proposal inviting more Meskhetian Turks to move to villages in southern Russia that had been abandoned by ethnic Russians who were moving to the cities. However, the Meskhetian Turks response was that they would only leave Uzbekistan if the move were to be to their homeland. Then, in 1989, ethnic Uzbeks began a series of actions against the Turks, they became the victims of riots in the Ferghana valley which led to over a hundred deaths. Within days, Decision 503 was announced "inviting" the Turks to occupy the empty farms in southern Russia that they had resisted moving to for years and around 17,000 Meskhetian Turks were evacuated to Russia. Meskhetian Turks maintain that Moscow had planned the Uzbek riots. By the early 1990s, of the 70,000 Meskhetian Turks who were still resident in Uzbekistan, approximately 50,000 Turkish Meskhetian refugees went to Azerbaijan due to continued discrimination whilst others went to Russia and Ukraine due to fears of continued violence.

==== Mainland Turkish migration to Western and Northern Europe (1960s-present) ====
===== The "gastarbeiters" (guest workers) =====
The concept of the Gastarbeiter involved the agreements between the host country and Turkey which was bound up with policies of the governments involved, with state bureaucracies on both sides ultimately responsible for the dispatch and settlement of the workers. Subsequently, labor agreements were signed with several European countries- with Germany in 1961; with Austria, Belgium, and the Netherlands in 1964; with France in 1965; and with Sweden in 1967. The agreements were based on a principle of rotation, and a worker was expected to return home after a year of employment abroad. However, employers wanted to retain workers who had become accustomed to the work; therefore, the rotation principle never became practice. Workers were not permitted to take their families abroad with them, and were housed in group living quarters or dormitories known as "Heim".

Labour recruitment and social security agreements between Turkey and European states
Country	Labour recruitment agreement, date and place	Social security agreement, date and place
Austria	15 May 1964, Vienna	12 October 1966, Vienna
Belgium	16 July 1964, Brussels	4 July 1966, Brussels
Denmark		13 November 1970, Ankara
France	8 May 1965, Ankara	20 January 1972, Paris
Germany	30 October 1961, Bonn (was revised by 20 May protocol, Bonn)	30 April 1964, Bonn
Netherlands	19 August 1964, The Hague	5 April 1966, Ankara
Sweden	10 March 1967, Stockholm	30 June 1978, Stockholm
Switzerland		1 May 1969, Ankara
United Kingdom		9 September 1959, Ankara

===== Family reunifications =====
By the early 1970s, the majority of Turkish emigration to Western Europe was for the purpose of family reunification. Furthermore, by the 1990s, migration mainly by way of marriage continued to be one of the principal reasons for settling in Western Europe.

==== Migration of Western Thrace Turks to Western Europe (1960s-present) ====
About 25,000 to 40,000 Turks of Western Thrace, who are the ethnic Turks who live in the north-eastern part of Greece, have emigrated to Western Europe. Between 12,000 and 25,000 moved to Germany in the 1960s and 1970s, when the Thracian tobacco industry was affected by a severe crisis and many tobacco growers lost their income. After Germany, the Netherlands is the most popular destination for Western Thrace Turks, especially in the region of Randstad. There is also an estimated 600–700 Western Thrace Turks living in London, although the total number living outside London is unknown.

==== Migration of Bulgarian Turks to Western Europe (2000s-present) ====
According to the National Statistical Institute of Bulgaria, Bulgarian Turks make up 12% of short term migrants, 13% of long term migrants, and 12% of the labour migrants. However, it is unlikely that this generalisation shows a true indication of the ethnic make-up of Bulgarian citizens living abroad because Bulgarian citizens of Turkish origin make up entire majorities in some countries. For example, out of the 10,000 to 30,000 people from Bulgaria living in the Netherlands, the majority, of about 80%, are ethnic Turks from Bulgaria who have come from the south-eastern Bulgarian district of Kurdzhali. Moreover, the Bulgarian Turks are the fastest-growing group of immigrants in the Netherlands. There is also about 30,000 Bulgarian Turks living in Sweden, a growing community in the United Kingdom and Germany, and 1,000 in Austria.

== Population ==
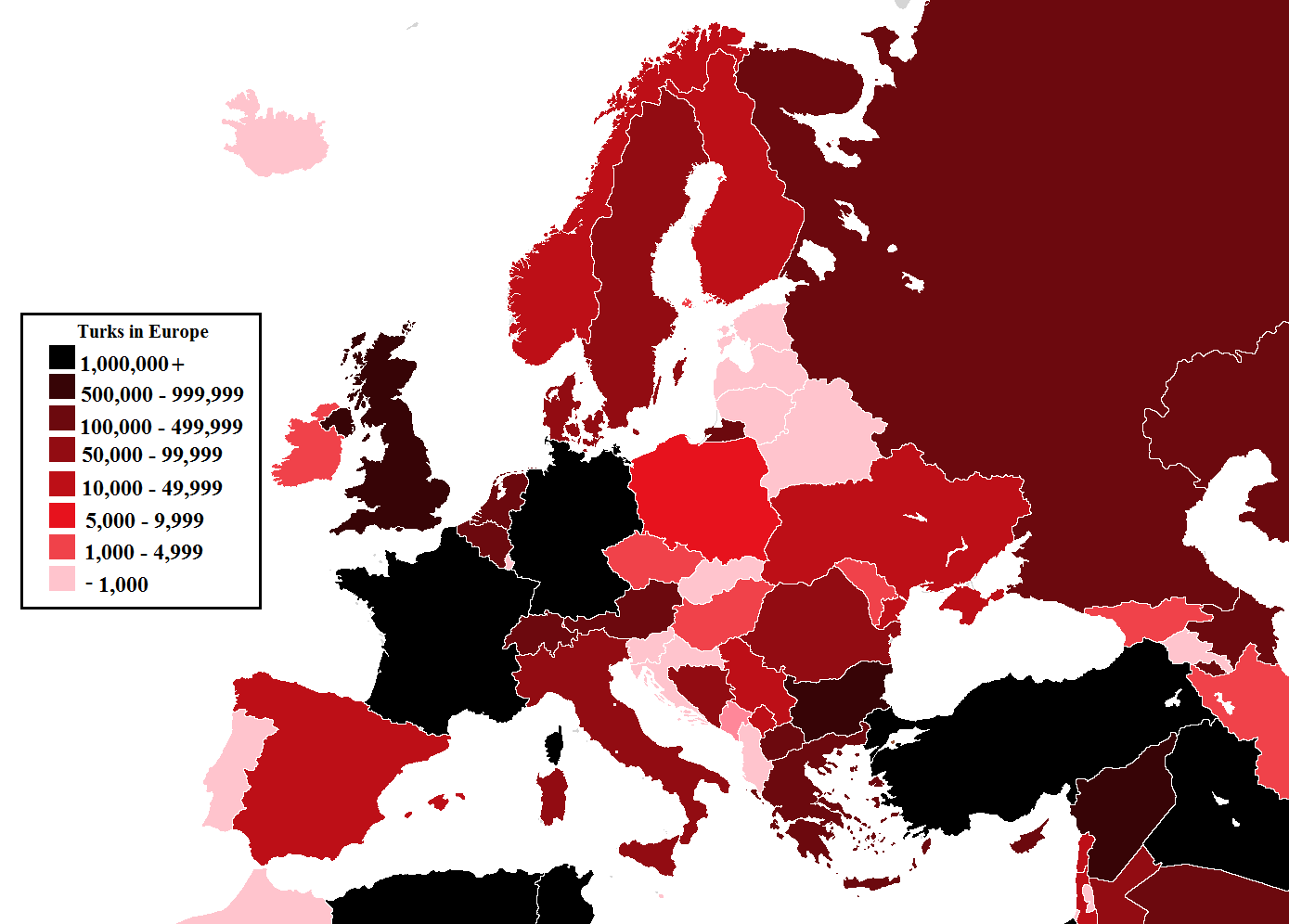
Distribution of Turks in Europe.

In the post-Ottoman countries, Turkish Cypriots (alongside recent Anatolian settlers) form a majority in Northern Cyprus; furthermore, in the Balkans, the Turks are the second largest ethnic group in Bulgaria, and the third largest ethnic group in North Macedonia. In the diaspora (i.e. outside the former territories of the Ottoman Empire), the Turkish people form the second largest ethnic group in Austria, Denmark, Germany and the Netherlands.

As early as 1997 Professor Servet Bayram and Professor Barbara Seels said that there was 10 million Turks living in Western Europe and the Balkans (excluding Cyprus and Turkey). By 2010, Boris Kharkovsky from the Center for Ethnic and Political Science Studies said that there was up to 15 million Turks living in the European Union. According to Dr Araks Pashayan 10 million "Euro-Turks" alone were living in Germany, France, the Netherlands and Belgium in 2012. Yet, there are also significant Turkish communities living in Austria, the UK, Switzerland, Italy, Liechtenstein and the Scandinavian countries. As for Eastern Europe, Professor Oya Dursun-Özkanca said in 2019 that there was over 1 million Turks living in the Balkan countries (i.e. Bosnia and Herzegovina, Bulgaria, Croatia, Greece, Kosovo, Montenegro, North Macedonia, Romania and Serbia); meanwhile, approximately 400,000 Meskhetian Turks live in the European regions of the Post-Soviet states (i.e. Azerbaijan, Georgia, Kazakhstan, Russia and Ukraine). Also, the number of Turkish Cypriots and Turkish settlers living in North Cyprus is around 300,000 to 500,000.

In addition, in the Republic of Turkey over 10.6 million people were living in the European areas of the country (according to the 2012 census); furthermore, one-fifth of Turkey's entire population, or around 15–20 million Turks, descend from the muhacirs ("refugees") who were forced to leave the Balkans before and after the First World War. Also, the number of Turkish Cypriots in the country may exceed 600,000.

=== Turkish communities in former Ottoman territories ===
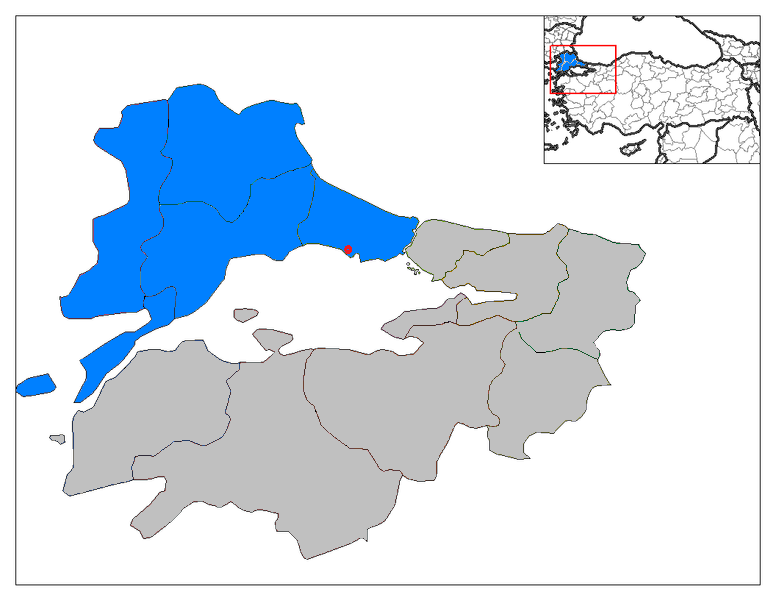
The Turkish provinces of Edirne, Tekirdağ and Kırklareli, as well as territories on the European continent of the provinces of Çanakkale and Istanbul fall under "European Turkey".

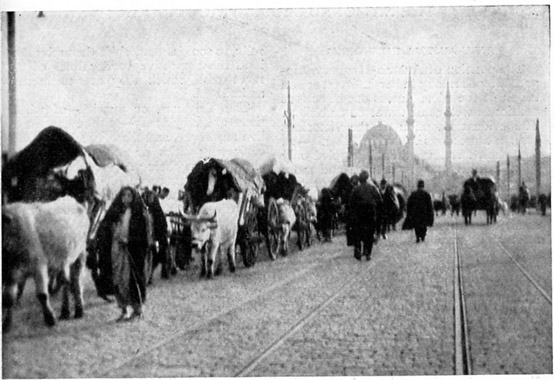
Ottoman Muslim muhacirs ("refugees") arriving in Constantinople (Istanbul) in 1912. Today, approximately one-fifth of Turkey's population, or around 15–20 million Turks, descend from remainders of families who survived the ethnic cleansings in Balkans in the 19th and 20th centuries.

==== Turkey ====
The Republic of Turkey is a transcontinental country with territory in both Europe and Asia. In its literal sense, the European region of the country is located in Eastern Thrace and includes all the territories of the Turkish provinces of Edirne, Tekirdağ and Kırklareli, as well as those territories on the European continent of the provinces of Çanakkale and Istanbul. The land borders of East Thrace were defined by the Treaty of Constantinople (1913) and the Bulgarian-Ottoman convention (1915), and were reaffirmed by the Treaty of Lausanne. According to the 2012 census, there was 10,620,739 people living in Eastern Thrace.

In addition, due to the formation of modern nation states the 19th and 20th centuries, millions of Turkish communities from the former Ottoman provinces fled persecution and arrived in Turkey as muhacirs ("refugees"). Today, approximately one-fifth of the Turkish population, or around 15–20 million Turks, is estimated to have Balkan origins. Most arrived from Bulgaria, Greece, Romania and Yugoslavia. In addition, there was significant migration waves from the island of Cyprus; today the Turkish Cypriot population in Turkey may exceed 600,000.

==== Balkans ====
===== Bosnia and Herzegovina =====
The last Bosnian census taken in 2013 recorded 1,108 Turks. The Turkish language is officially recognized as a minority language, in accordance with the European Charter for Regional or Minority Languages, under Article 2, paragraph 2, of the 2010 ratification. Other estimates suggests that there are more than 50,000 Turks.

===== Bulgaria =====
The Turks form a majority in the Kardzhali Province.

The Turks form a majority in the Razgrad Province.

The last Bulgarian census taken in 2011 recorded 588,318 Turks (i.e. 8.8% of Bulgaria's total population), and showed that they formed a majority in the Kardzhali Province and the Razgrad Province. However, in 2010, an article published by Novinite reported findings from the Center for Demographic Policy and claimed that the Turks numbered 1 million.

The Bulgarian constitution of 1991 does not mention any ethnic minorities and the Bulgarian language is the sole official language of the State. However, in accordance with Article 36(2), the Turkish minority has the right to study their own language alongside the compulsory study of the Bulgarian language. Moreover, under Article 54(1), the Turkish minority have the right to "develop their culture in accordance with his ethnic identification".

===== Croatia =====
The last Croatian census taken in 2011 recorded 367 Turks. Although a small community, the Turks are officially recognized as a minority ethnic group, in accordance with the 2010 Constitution of Croatia.

===== Greece =====
Flag of the short-lived Independent Government of Western Thrace (now in modern-day Greece). A Turkish consciousness in today's Western Thrace extends back to the founding of the first of four western Thracian republics in the summer of 1913.

The last Greek census which allowed citizens to declare their ethnicity was taken in 1951; it recorded 85,945 Turks, which formed 1.2% of Greece's total population. In 1990 Lois Whitman from Human Rights Watch said that the Turks living the Western Thrace region numbered between 120,000 and 130,000 (i.e. between 33 and 36 percent of the population). More recently, in 2011 Dr Hermann Kandler said that the Turkish minority numbered 150,000 (about 50 percent of the population of Greek Thrace). Due to economic reasons, some Western Thrace Turks have migrated to Athens and Thessaloniki. In addition, there is around 5,000 Turks in the Dodecanese islands of Rhodes and Kos.

The Turks of Western Thrace have protected status to practice their religion and use the Turkish language, in accordance with the 1923 Treaty of Lausanne. Since the mid-1950s the Greek government referred to the ethnic rather than the religious character of the minority, until the governor general of Thrace instructed the local authorities to substitute the word "Turkish" for Muslim". However, Dr Hermann Kandler points out that the minority is "essentially based on a Turkish rather than a Muslim historical consciousness" and that this "extends back to the founding of the first of four western Thracian republics in the summer of 1913" which existed for only 55 days. The other sizable Turkish minorities living throughout Greece have no official recognition.

===== Kosovo =====
The last Kosovan census taken in 2011 recorded 18,738 Turks, which formed 1.1% of Kosovo's total population. However, the OSCE in 2010 suggest that there was 30,000 Kosovo Turks. The European Centre for Minority Issues Kosovo also said that the 2011 census figures is lower than other estimates.

The Turkish language is recognized as an official language in the municipalities of Prizren and Mamusha and has minority status in Gjilan, Pristina, Vushtrri, and Mitrovica.

===== Montenegro =====
The last Montenegrin census taken in 2011 recorded 104 Turks.

===== North Macedonia =====
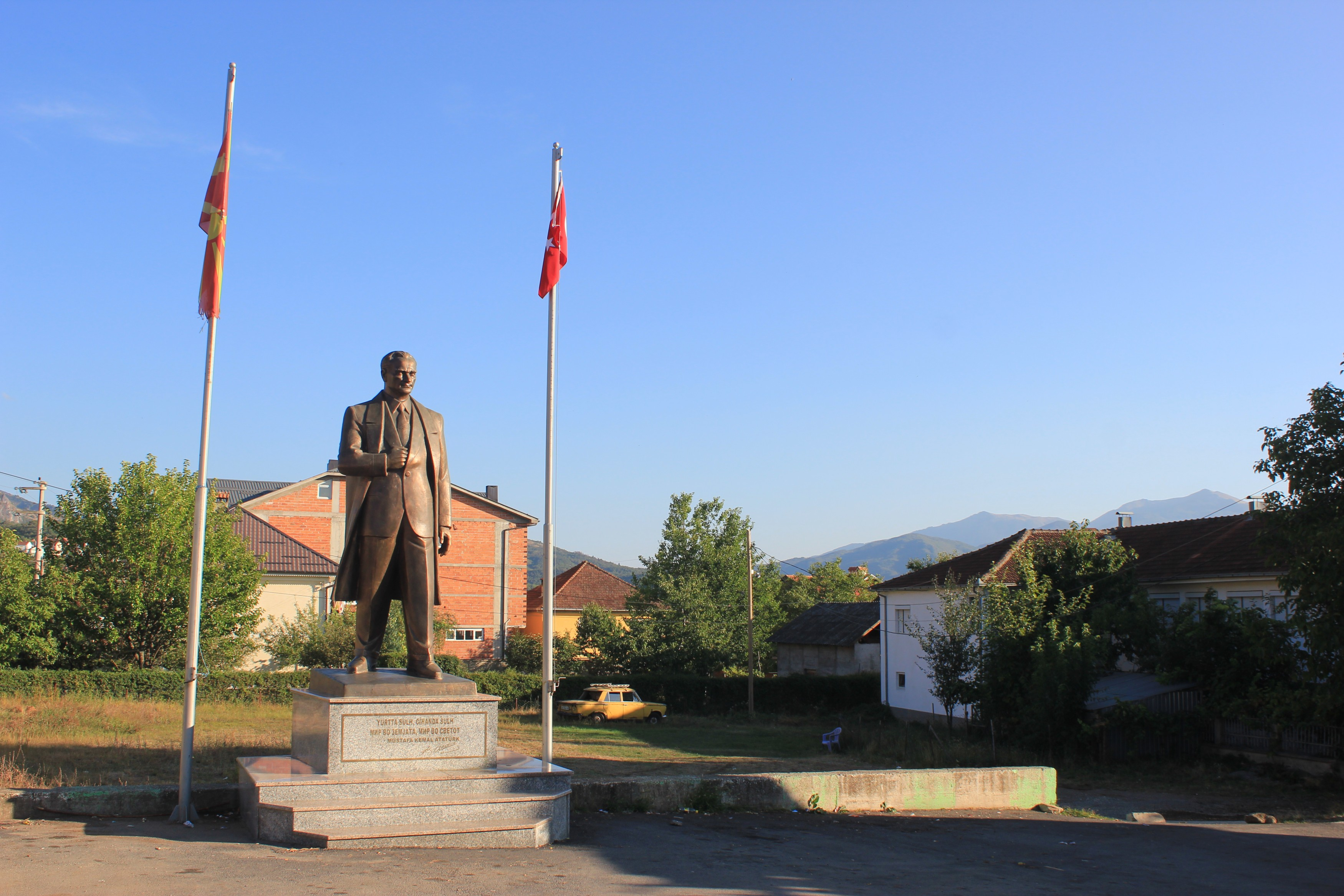
A statue of Mustafa Kemal Atatürk in Centar Župa where the Turks form a majority.

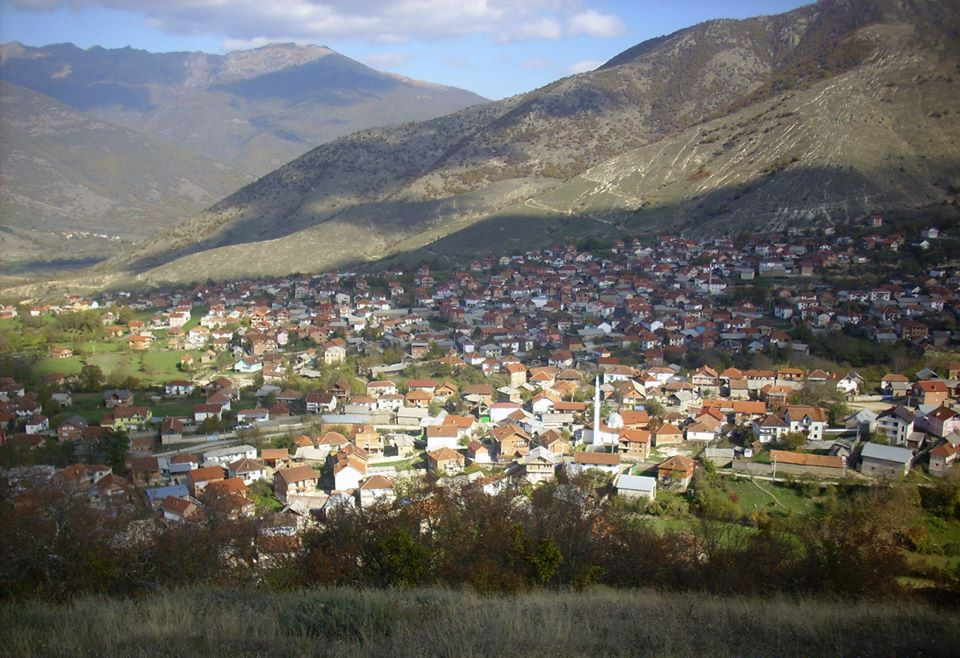
The Turks form a majority in the Plasnica Municipality.

The last Macedonian census taken in 2002 recorded 77,959 Turks, which formed 3.85% of North Macedonia's total population. Yet, in 1996 Fred Abrahams from Human Rights Watch said that, like other ethnic minority groups in the country, leaders of the Turkish community claim higher numbers than the censuses show; for example, Erdogan Saraç of the Democratic Party of Turks had estimated that between 170,000 and 200,000 ethnic Turks were living in the country.

Initially the 1988 draft constitution spoke of the "state of the Macedonian people and the Albanian and Turkish minority". Once the 1991 constitution came into force the Turkish language was used officially where Turks formed a majority in the Centar Župa Municipality and the Plasnica Municipality. Since the 2001 amendment to the constitution, the Turkish language is officially used where Turks form at least 20% of the population and hence it is also an official language of Mavrovo and Rostuša.

===== Romania =====
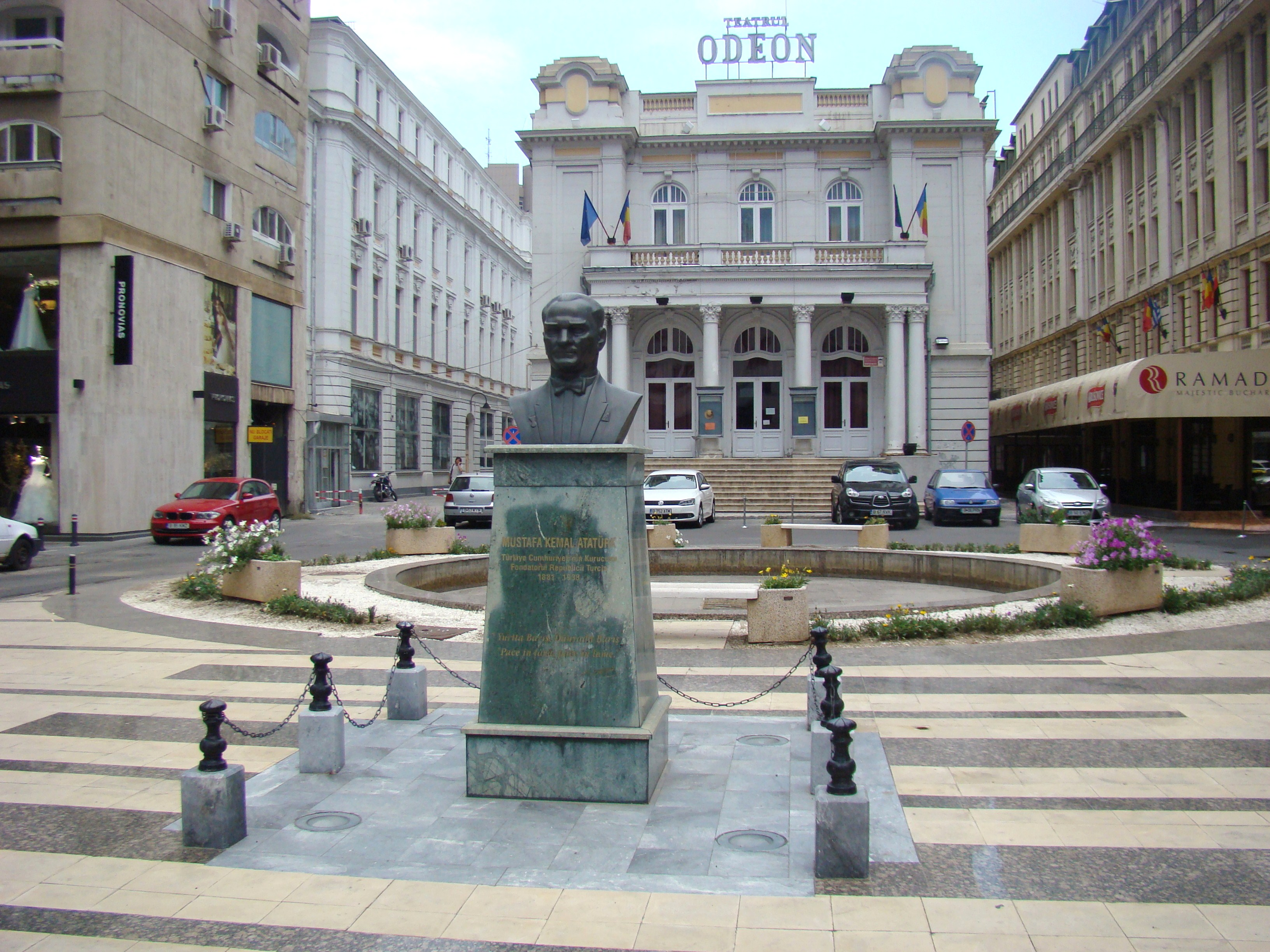
A statue of Mustafa Kemal Atatürk in Bucharest.

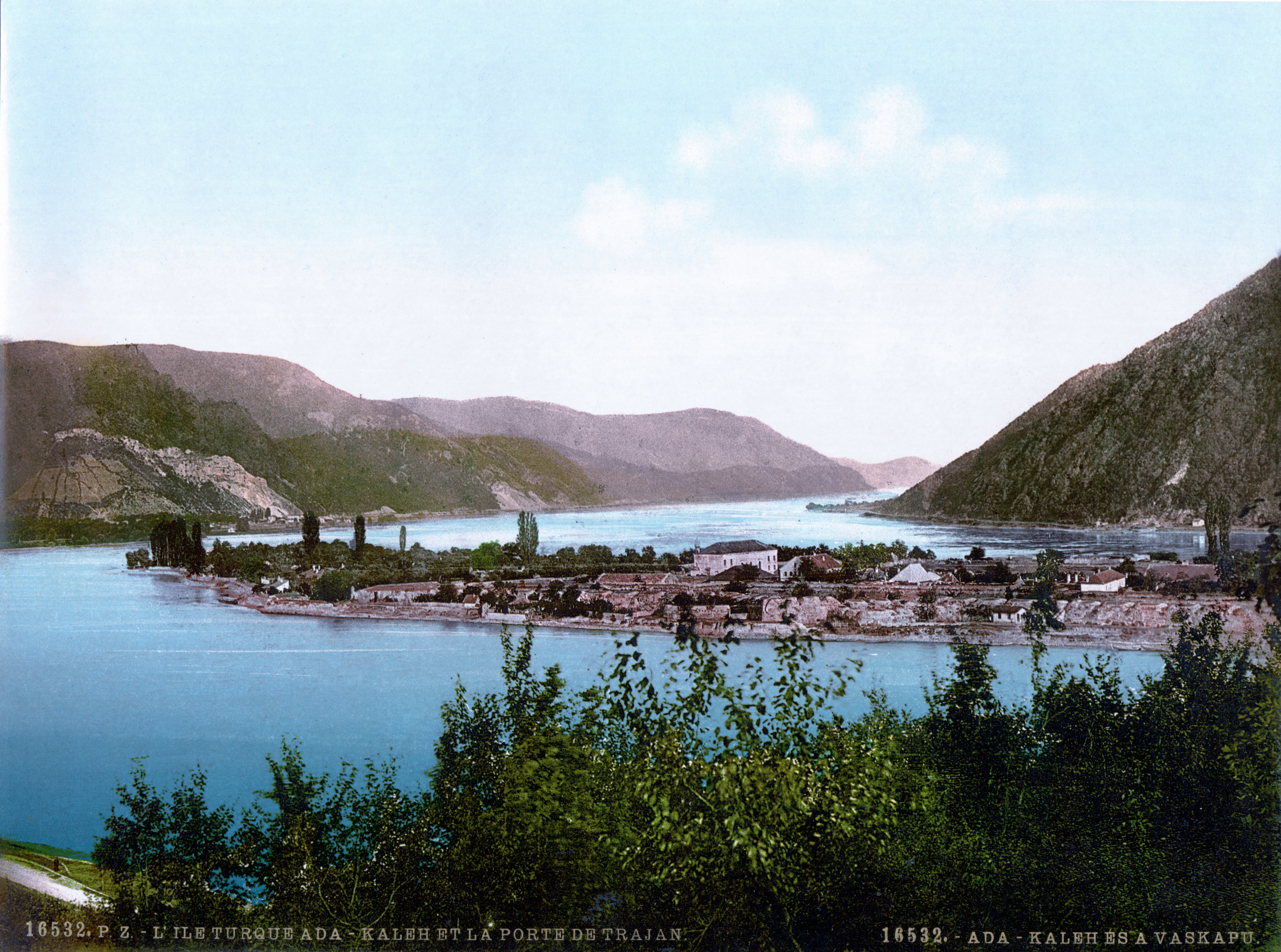
The island of Ada Kaleh had a Turkish majority population. It was submerged into the Danube during the construction of the Iron Gates hydroelectric plant in 1970.

The last Romanian census taken in 2011 recorded 28,226 recorded Turks, which formed 0.15% of Romania's total population. However, in 2006, the President of Romania, Traian Băsescu, and Professor David Phinnemore had estimated that the Turkish minority numbered 55,000. Furthermore, in 2008 Professor Daniela-Luminita Constantin, Professor Zizi Goschin and Professor Mariana Dragusin said that the total Turkish population was 80,000 - including the Turkish minority and recent Turkish immigrants.

The Turkish language is officially recognized as a minority language, in accordance with the European Charter for Regional or Minority Languages, under Part III of the 2007 ratification.

Today, the only region left with a Turkish majority population is Dobromir, a commune in the Constanța County. Historically, the Turks also formed a majority on the island of Ada Kaleh, which was submerged during the construction of the Iron Gates hydroelectric plant in 1970.

===== Serbia =====
The last Serbian census undertaken in 2011 recorded 647 Turks.

==== Cyprus ====
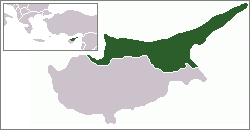
Prior to the Cyprus dispute Turkish Cypriots lived throughout the island of Cyprus. However, the 1974 Cypriot coup d'état initiated by the Greek military junta, which sought to annex the island to Greece, prompted the Turkish invasion of Cyprus followed by the declaration of the Turkish Federated State of Cyprus. Since the establishment of the Turkish Republic of Northern Cyprus in 1983 the majority of Turkish Cypriots live mostly in the northern region of the island.

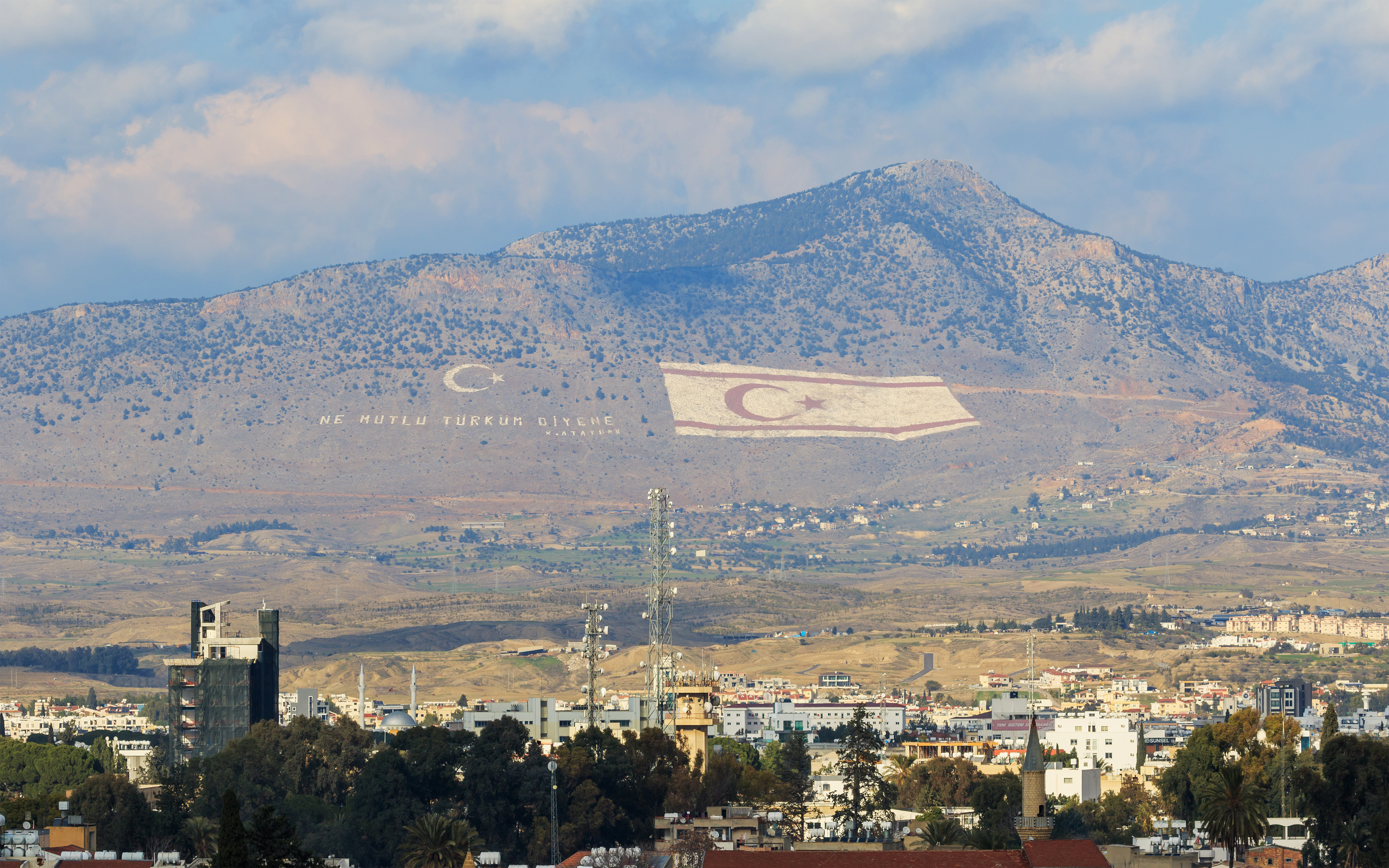
Flag of the Turkish Republic of Northern Cyprus on the Kyrenia Mountains.

With the establishment of the Republic of Cyprus in 1960, the Cypriot constitution (Articles 2 and 3) recognized the Turkish Cypriots as one of the "Two Communities" of the republic (alongside the Greek Cypriots). Hence, legally, they were given equal power-sharing rights with the Greek Cypriots and were not defined as a "minority group"; furthermore, the Turkish language was also recognized as an official language of the republic, alongside the Greek language. However, due to the Cyprus crisis of 1963–64, followed by the Greek-led 1974 Cypriot coup d'état (which sought to achieve Enosis and establish the "Hellenic Republic of Cyprus" by ethnically cleansing the Turkish Cypriots under the Akritas plan also known as "the blueprint to genocide"), and then the 1974 Turkish invasion of Cyprus, the Turkish Cypriots declared their own state – the Turkish Republic of Northern Cyprus (TRNC) – in 1983.

Today Northern Cyprus is populated mostly by Turkish Cypriots and recent Anatolian Turkish settlers. According to the 2011 TRNC census, the population of Northern Cyprus was 286,257. Other estimates suggests that there is between 300,000 and 500,000 Turkish Cypriots and Turkish settlers living in the north of the island. In addition, there was 1,128 Turkish Cypriots living in the south of the island in the 2011 census.

==== Hungary ====
The Turkish people first began to migrate to Hungary during the Ottoman rule of Hungary (1541–1699). A second wave of Ottoman-Turkish migration occurred in the late 19th century when relations between the Ottoman Empire and the Austro-Hungarian Empire improved; most of these immigrants settled in Budapest. In the 2001 Hungarian census, 1,565 people declared their ethnicity as "Ottoman Turkish"; in addition, 12 individuals declared to be "Turk" and 91 "Bulgarian-Turkish".

=== Modern Turkish diasporas outside former Ottoman territories ===
==== Central and Western Europe ====
The Turks form substantial communities in "Western Europe" which includes countries with their borders strictly in Western Europe (i.e. Belgium, France, Ireland, the Netherlands and the United Kingdom) as well as countries with territory in both Western and Central Europe (i.e. Austria, Germany, Liechtenstein and Switzerland).

===== Austria =====
The Turkish community, including descendants, form the largest ethnic minority in Austria. In 2011 a report by the Initiative Minderheiten said that there was 360,000 people of Turkish origin living in Austria. This figure has also been echoed by the former Austrian Foreign Minister and current Chancellor of Austria Sebastian Kurz. By 2010 Ariel Muzicant said that the Turks in Austria already numbered 400,000. Another estimate by the former Austrian MEP, Andreas Mölzer, has claimed that there are 500,000 Turks in the country. Most of the Austrian-Turkish community descend from Turkey, however, there are also Turkish communities which have migrated to Austria from Bulgaria and Greece.

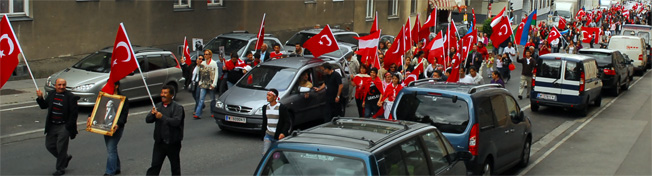
Turkish day in Vienna, Austria (2009).

===== Belgium =====
In 2012 Professor Raymond Taras said that the Belgian-Turkish community was over 200,000. More recently, in 2019 Dr Altay Manço and Dr Ertugrul Taş said that there was 250,000 Belgian residents of Turkish origin.

===== France =====
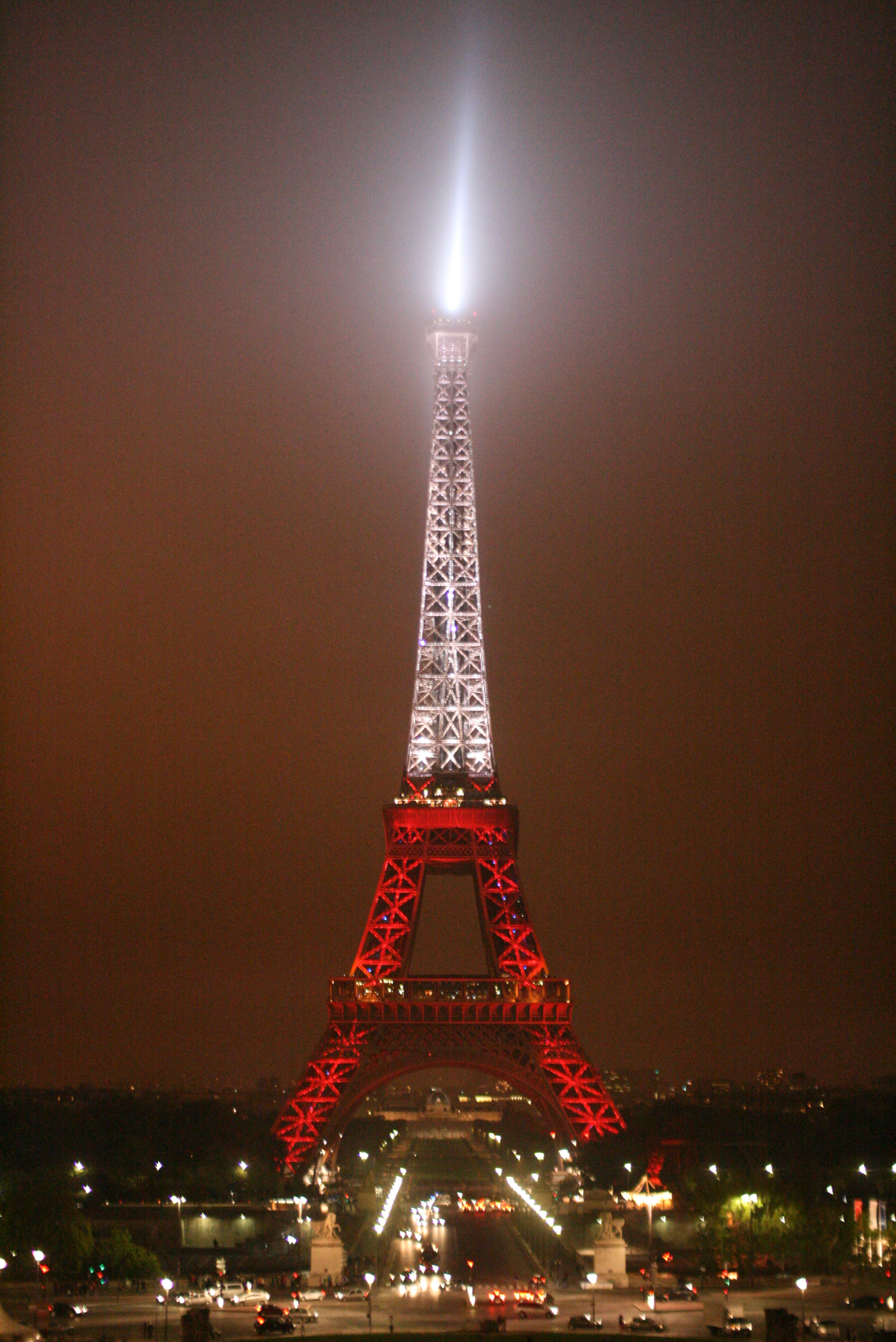
The Eiffel Tower wearing the colours of the Turkish flag during the "Saison de la Turquie en France".

There is around one million people of Turkish origin living in France.

The Turks living in France are one of the largest Turkish communities in Western Europe. Official data on the total number of French Turks is not available because the French census only records statistics on the country of birth rather than one's ethnic affiliation.

Although the majority of French Turks descend from the Republic of Turkey, there has also been significant Turkish migration from other post-Ottoman countries including ethnic Turkish communities which have come to France from North Africa (especially Algeria and Tunisia), the Balkans (e.g. from Bulgaria, Greece, Kosovo, North Macedonia and Romania), the island of Cyprus, and more recently from Iraq, Lebanon, and Syria.

In 2014 Professor Pierre Vermeren reported in L'Express that the Turkish population was around 800,000. However, an earlier academic publication in 2010 by Dr Jean-Gustave Hentz and Dr Michel Hasselmann said that there was already 1 million Turks living in France. Professor İzzet Er, as well as the French-Armenian politician Garo Yalic (who is an advisor to Valerie Boyer), also said that there was 1,000,000 Turks in France in 2011 and 2012 respectively. More recently, the Franco-Turkish population has been estimated to be more than one million according to French-published articles in Le Petit Journal (2019) and Marianne (2020).

===== Germany =====
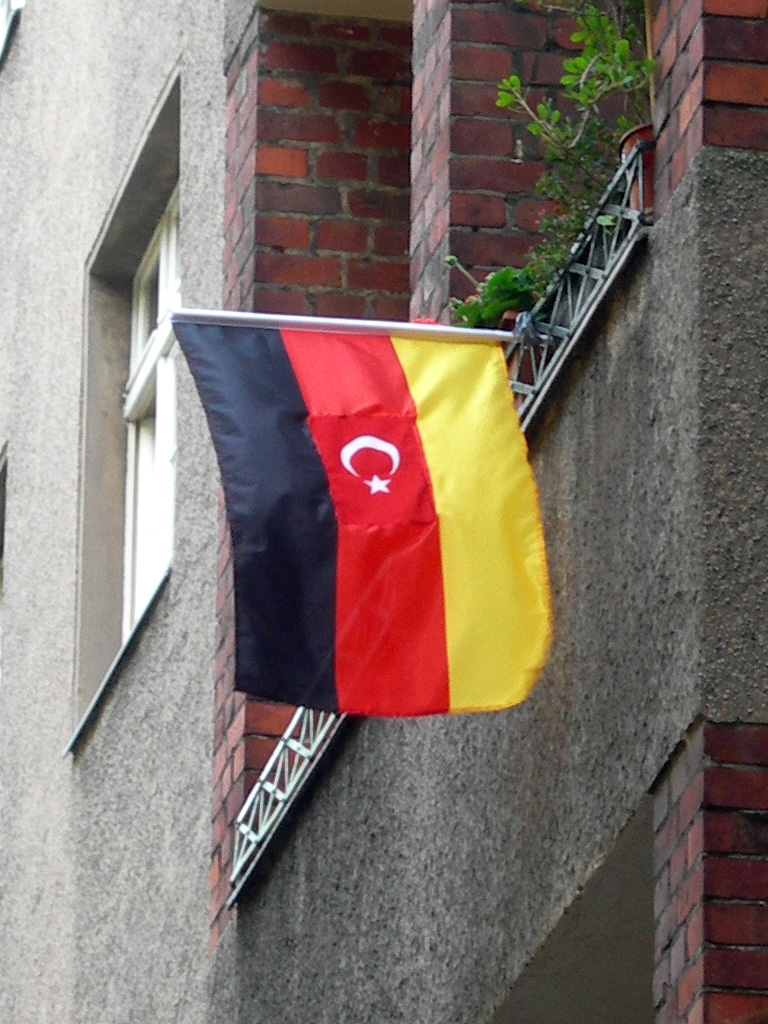
A popularized German-Turkish community flag.

The Turkish-Germans are the largest ethnic minority group in Germany and also the largest Turkish community in the Turkish diaspora.

The German census only collects data on country of birth, rather than ethnicity, consequently, official figures do not provide a true representation of the total population (i.e. including German-born descendants of full or partial Turkish origin regardless of country of birth). The majority of ethnic Turks living in Germany have either arrived from or originate from Turkey; however, there are also significant ethnic Turkish communities which have come from (or descend from) post-Ottoman nation-states in the Balkans (especially from Bulgaria and Greece), as well as from the island of Cyprus, and Lebanon. More recently, since the European migrant crisis (2014–19), there has also been a significant increase in the number of ethnic Turks from Syria, Iraq and Kosovo who have come to Germany.

In 1997 the Chancellor of Germany, Helmut Kohl, said that there was 3 million Turks in Germany. However, since the early 2000s, numerous academics have said that there is "at least" or "more than" 4 million people of Turkish origin living in Germany (forming approximately 5% of the country's population). Numerous sources have suggested significantly higher estimates. As early as 2005 Austrian scholar Dr. Tessa Szyszkowitz quoted a senior European official who said:

It is a little late to start the debate about being an immigrant country now, when already seven million Turks live in Germany".

By 2013 Dr James Lacey and Professor Williamson Murray noted that the German chancellor, Angela Merkel, said that Germany's Leitkultur "needs to be accepted by Germany's seven million Turkish immigrants".

As of 2020, numerous sources have said that there are 7 million, or more than 7 million, Turks in Germany, including Professor George K. Zestos and Rachel Cooke in their report published by the Levy Economics Institute, Professor Graham E. Fuller's article in the Quincy Institute for Responsible Statecraft, Professor James G. Lacey's article in the National Security Innovation Network. and Louise Callaghan's article in The Times.

===== Liechtenstein =====
Liechtenstein does not record data on the ethnicity of its citizens; however, in 2009, the Turkish community was estimated to number approximately 1,000 out of a total population of 35,000. Hence, estimates suggest that the Turks form around 3% of Liechtenstein's total population and that they are the fifth largest ethnic group in the country.

===== Netherlands =====
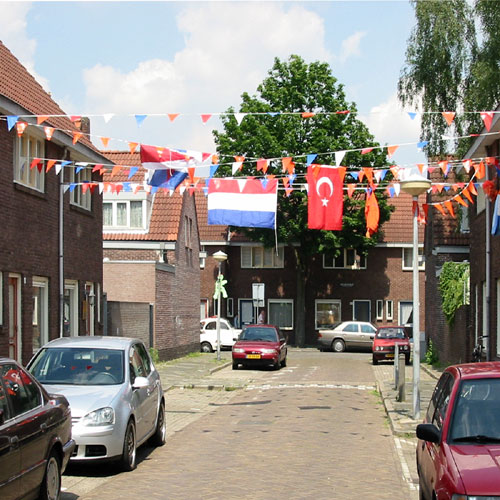
Turkish and Dutch flag hanging together in Kruidenbuurt, Eindhoven.

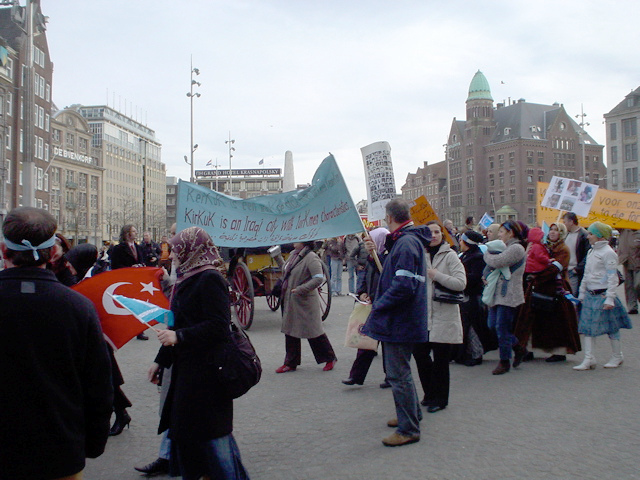
Iraqi Turks protesting in Amsterdam.

The Turkish-Dutch community form the largest ethnic minority group in the Netherlands. The majority of Dutch Turks descend from the Republic of Turkey; however there has also been significant Turkish migration waves from other post-Ottoman countries including ethnic Turkish communities which have come to the Netherlands from the Balkans (e.g. especially from Bulgaria, Greece, and North Macedonia), the island of Cyprus, and more recently during the European migrant crisis from Syria, Iraq and Kosovo. In addition, there has been migration to the Netherlands from the Turkish diaspora; many Turkish-Belgians and Turkish-Germans have arrived in the country as Belgian and German citizens.

The Dutch official census only collects data on country of birth, rather than ethnically; consequently, the total number of ethnic Turkish migrants (regardless of country of birth) nor the third, fourth or fifth generation of the Turkish-Dutch community have been collectively counted. Assistant Professor Suzanne Aalberse, Professor Ad Backus and Professor Pieter Muysken have said that "over the years" the Dutch-Turkish community "must have numbered half a million". However, there are significantly higher estimates. As early as 2003, the political scientist and international relations expert Nathalie Tocci said that there was already "two million Turks in Holland". Rita van Veen also reported in Trouw that there was 2 million Turks in the Netherlands in 2007.

In 2009 The Sophia Echo reported that Bulgarian Turks were now the fastest-growing group of immigrants in the Netherlands.

The CBS gives a total number of 444.300 Turks in 2022, up from 271.500 in 1996. About half were born in the Netherlands (second generation) and the other half outside the Netherlands (first generation) The third generation, those who are born in the Netherlands including their parents but at least one grandparent not, was 36.200 in 2022. This only accounts for people being between the age of 0 and 55. In 2022 there were about 430.000 Turks in the Netherlands. The third generation is counted as autochthonous. Thus, the total number of people in the Netherlands with at least one grandparent born in Turkey in 2022 was at least 466.200.

===== Poland =====
In 2013 data from the Institute of Public Affairs showed that there were 5,000 Turks living in Poland. In 2023 Turkish Ministry of Foreign Affairs estimated that around 25,000 Turkish citizens are living in Poland, including students under Erasmus+ program.

===== Slovenia =====
The last Slovenian census taken in 2002 recorded 359 Turks.

===== Switzerland =====
In 2017 there was over 120,000 Turks living in Switzerland. They mostly live in German-speaking regions, especially in the cantons of Zurich, Aargau and Basel. Figures on naturalization and migration from Turkey has been declining, however, the Swiss population with a Turkish migration background continues to grow.

===== United Kingdom =====
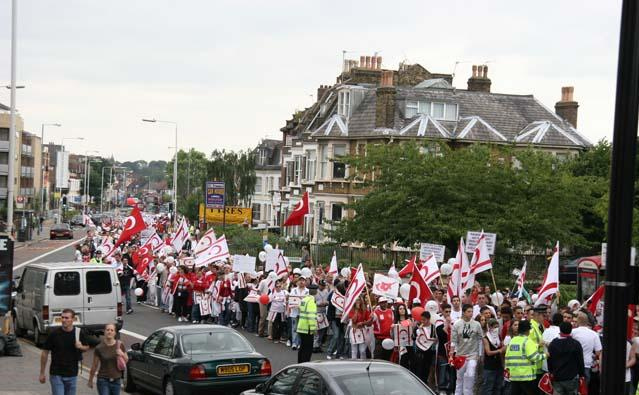
Turkish Cypriots protesting in London

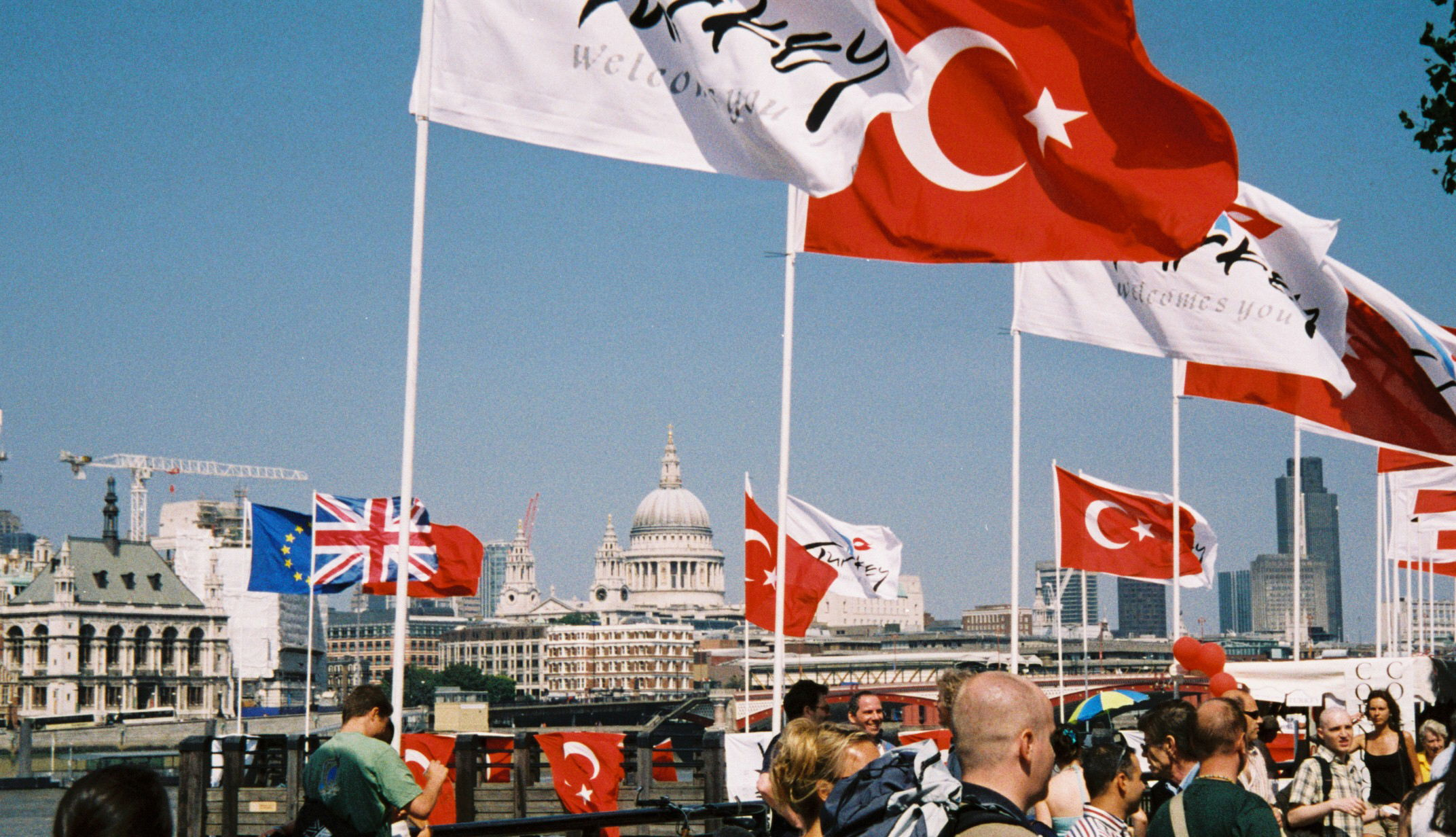
A Turkish Festival near South Bank.

In 2011 the Home Affairs Committee stated here was 500,000 British Turks made up of 300,000 Turkish Cypriots, 150,000 Turkish nationals (i.e. people from Turkey), and smaller groups of Bulgarian Turks and Romanian Turks. In addition, there are growing Turkish communities in the UK which have arrived from Algeria, Bulgaria, Greece (i.e. Western Thrace region), Iraq and Syria.

==== Northern Europe ====
===== Denmark =====
The Turkish community form the largest ethnic minority in Denmark. In 2008 the Danish Broadcasting Corporation estimated that Danes of Turkish origin numbered 70,000. Whilst the majority of Danish Turks originate from Turkey, there is also a Turkish community from Iraq living in the country.

===== Finland =====
In 2010 Professor Zeki Kütük said that there was approximately 10,000 people of Turkish origin living in Finland.

===== Norway =====
In 2013 there was roughly 16,500 Norwegians of Turkish descent living in Norway.

===== Sweden =====
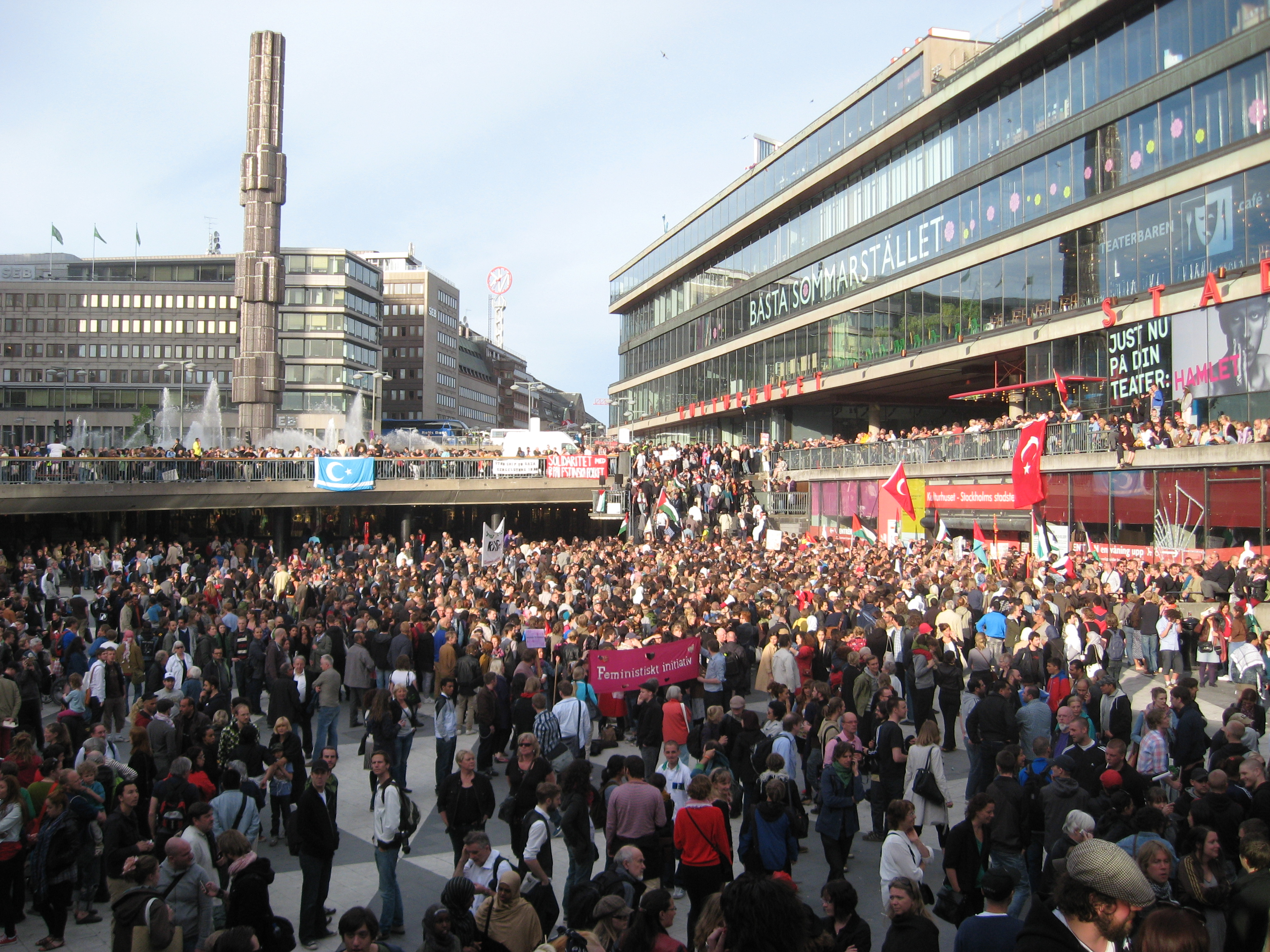
Swedish Turks protesting in Stockholm with Turkish and Iraqi Turkish flags.

In 2009 the Swedish Ministry for Foreign Affairs said that there was almost 100,000 people with a Turkish background living in Sweden. More recently, in 2018 the Swedish Consul General, Therese Hyden, said that the population was now around 150,000.

Although the majority of Swedish Turks originate from the modern borders of Turkey, there has also been substantial Turkish migration waves from Bulgaria (which numbered approximately 30,000 in 2002); furthermore, there is a substantial number of Macedonian Turks with approximately 4,5000 from Prespa region living in Malmö. Turks have also arrived from Iraq and Syria, especially since the European migrant crisis.

==== Southern Europe ====
===== Italy =====
In 2020 there was 50,000 Turkish citizens living in Italy; however, this figure does not include naturalized Italian citizens of Turkish origin or their descendants. In addition to the diaspora, some of the population in Moena has identified as Turkish since the 17th century.

===== Spain =====
The Turkish community in Spain has been increasing significantly since the 2000s. In 2015 there was approximately 10,000 Turkish citizens living in the country, especially in Madrid and Barcelona; however, this figure does not include naturalized Spain citizens of Turkish origin or their descendants.

==== Eastern Europe ====
The majority of Turks living in Eastern Europe are from the Turkish Meskhetian minority with were deported from Meskhetia in Georgia in 1944.

Country	Official censuses	Dr Aydıngün (2006 estimate)	Al Jazeera (2014 estimate)	Further information
Azerbaijan	38,000 (2009 Azeri census)	90,000–110,000	87,000	Turks in Azerbaijan
Russia	105,058 Turks and 4,825 Meskhetian Turks; Total: 109,883 (2010 Russian census)	70,000–90,000	95,000	Turks in Russia
Kazakhstan	97,015 (2009 Kazakh census)	150,000	180,000	Turks in Kazakhstan
Ukraine	8,844 (2001 Ukrainian census)	10,000	8,000	Turks in Ukraine
Georgia	*Pre-World War II: 137,921 (1926 USSR census) 1,375 (1989 USSR census) Not recorded in modern Georgian census	600–1,000	1,500	Turks in Georgia

== Religion ==
=== Notable Ottoman-Turkish Mosques in the Balkans ===
Name	Images	City	Year	Remarks
Šarena Mosque		Tetovo	1438 later rebuilt in 1833	
Alaca Imaret Mosque		Thessaloniki	1484 or 1487	
Mustafa Pasha Mosque		Skopje	1492	
Ibrahim Pasha Mosque		Razgrad	1516	
Gazi Husrev-beg Mosque		Sarajevo	1530	
Ali Pasha Mosque (Sarajevo)		Sarajevo	1560	
Banya Bashi Mosque		Sofia	1566	
Bajrakli Mosque		Belgrad	1575	
Esmahan Sultan Mosque		Constanța County	1575	
Yakovalı Hasan Paşa Mosque		Pécs	late 16th-century	
Sinan Pasha Mosque (Prizren)		Prizren	1615	
Tombul Mosque		Shumen	1740-1744	
Et'hem Bey Mosque		Tirana	1819 or 1821	
Azizyie Mosque		Tulcea	1863	

=== Notable Ottoman-Turkish Mosques in Cyprus ===
Name	Images	City	Year	Remarks
Agha Cafer Pasha Mosque		Kyrenia	1580s	
Arabahmet Mosque		Nicosia (North)	1571	
Araplar Mosque		Nicosia (South)	?	
Bayraktar Mosque		Nicosia (South)	1571	The first mosque built by the Ottomans after the conquest of Nicosia
Hala Sultan Tekke		Larnaca	1816/17	
Iplik Pazari Mosque		Nicosia (North)	18th century	
Kebir Mosque		Limassol	?	"The Grand Mosque"
Lala Mustafa Pasha Mosque		Famagusta	?	Originally known as the 'Saint Nicolas Cathedral', the French Lusignan dynasty constructed it between 1298 and 1312.
Ömeriye Mosque		Nicosia (South)	1571–1572	First site of prayer by Turks on island of Cyprus following its conquest in 1571.
Osman Fazil Polat Pasha Mosque		Famagusta	?	
Selimiye Mosque		Nicosia (North)	?	Originally known as the 'Saint Sophia Cathedral', the French Lusignan dynasty constructed it between 1209 and 1228.
Turunçlu Mosque		Nicosia (North)	·1825	
Ziya Pasha Mosque		Dali	1837	

=== Notable Turkish Mosques in Western Europe ===
Name	Images	Country	Construction Year
Eyüp-Sultan Mosque		Austria (Telfs)	1998
Islamic Cultural Centre and Mosque		Austria (Bad Vöslau)	2008
Yunus Emre Mosque		Belgium (Genk)	
Osmanli Mosque		France (Nantes)	2007–10
Alperenler Mosque		Germany (Rheinfelden)	1996
Cologne Central Mosque		Germany (Cologne)	2017
Centrum Mosque Hamburg		Germany (Hamburg)	1977
Centrum Mosque Rendsburg		Germany (Rendsburg)	2008
DITIB Merkez Mosque		Germany (Duisburg)	2004–08
Emir Sultan Mosque		Germany (Darmstadt)	1996
Emir Sultan Mosque		Germany (Hilden)	1999
Eyüp Sultan Mosque		Germany (Gersthofen)	2008
Fatih Mosque		Germany (Bremen)	1973
Fatih-Moschee		Germany (Essen)	
Fatih Mosque		Germany (Heilbronn)	
Fatih Mosque)		Germany (Meschede)	2001–08
Fatih Mosque		Germany (Pforzheim)	1990–92
Fatih Mosque		Germany (Werl)	1990
Göttingen Mosque		Germany (Göttingen)	2008
Great Mosque		Germany (Buggingen)	1995–2002
Kocatepe Mosque		Germany (Ingolstadt)	2008
Königswinter Mosque		Germany (Königswinter)	2001
Mehmet Akif Mosque		Germany (Friedrichshafen)	
Mevlana Mosque		Germany (Ravensburg)	2002–08
Mevlana Mosque		Germany (Eppingen)	1996–2003
Mevlana Moschee		Germany (Kassel)	2008–14
Mimar Sinan Mosque		Germany (Mosbach)	1993
Mimar Sinan Mosque		Germany (Sachsenheim)	2007
Mimar Sinan Mosque		Germany (Wesseling)	1987
Şehitler Merkez Mosque		Germany (Schwäbisch Gmünd)	2011–14
Şehitlik Mosque		Germany (Berlin)	2004
Ulu Mosque		Germany (Sindelfingen)	2000
Vatan Mosque		Germany (Brackwede)	2004
Yavuz Sultan Selim Mosque		Germany (Mannheim)	1995
Aksa Mosque		Netherlands (The Hague)	Former synagogue converted into a mosque in 1981
Fatih-moskee		Netherlands (Amsterdam)	Former church converted to a mosque in 1981
Mevlana Mosque		Netherlands (Rotterdam)	2001
Süleymaniye Mosque		Netherlands (Tilburg)	2001
Sultan Ahmet Mosque		Netherlands (Delft)	1995–2007
Ulu Mosque		Netherlands (Bergen op Zoom)	1984
Ulu Camii Mosque		Netherlands (Utrecht)	2008–15
Westermoskee (Ayasofya Mosque)		Netherlands (Amsterdam)	2013–15
Fittja Mosque		Sweden (Fittja)	1998–2007
Mosque of the Olten Turkish Cultural Association		Switzerland (Wangen bei Olten)	
Aziziye Mosque		UK (London)	1983
Suleymaniye Mosque		UK (London)	1999
Shacklewell Lane Mosque		UK (London)	Former synagogue converted to a mosque in 1977

== Politics ==
In March 2017, Turkish President Recep Tayyip Erdoğan stated to the Turks in Europe, "Make not three, but five children. Because you are the future of Europe. That will be the best response to the injustices against you." This has been interpreted as an imperialist call for demographic warfare.

According to The Economist, Erdoğan is the first Turkish leader to take the Turkish diaspora seriously, which has created friction within these diaspora communities and between the Turkish government and several of its European counterparts.

=== List of Turkish founded political parties ===
Various political parties have been formed by Turkish communities in the Balkans and Cyprus as well as in the Turkish diaspora.

Political party	Country	Year established	Founders	Current Leader	Position	Ideologies
New Movement for the Future (German: Neue Bewegung für die Zukunft, NBZ; Turkish: Gelecek İçin Yeni Hareket)	Austria	2017		Adnan Dinçer		Turkish and Muslim minority interests
Be.One	Belgium	2018	Meryem Kaçar, Dyab Abou Jahjah and Karim Hassoun		Left-wing	Multiculturalism, Feminism, Anti-racism
Multicultural Justice Party (Dutch: Multiculturele Recht Partij, MRP; Turkish: Çok Kültürlü Adalet Partisi)	Belgium	2017	Murat Köylü	Murat Köylü		Turkish minority interests
Flemish Multicultural Collective (Dutch: Vlaamse Multicultureel Collectief, VMC; Turkish: Flaman Çok Kültürlü Kültürel Kollektifi)	Belgium	2018	Ahmet Koç	Ahmet Koç		Turkish minority interests
Democrats for Responsibility, Solidarity and Tolerance (Bulgarian: Демократи за отговорност, свобода и толерантност, ДОСТ/DOST; Turkish: Sorumluluk, Özgürlük ve Hoşgörü için Demokratlar)	Bulgaria	2016		Lyutvi Mestan	Centre	Liberalism, Europeanism, Anti-fascism, Anti-nationalism
Freedom and Dignity People's Party (Bulgarian: Народна партия „Свобода и достойнство“, НПСД/NPSD; Turkish: Hürriyet ve Şeref Halk Partisi)	Bulgaria	2012		Orhan Ismailov		Liberalism
Movement for Rights and Freedoms (Bulgarian: Движение за права и свободи, ДПС/DPS; Turkish: Hak ve Özgürlükler Hareketi)	Bulgaria	1990	Ahmed Dogan	Mustafa Karadaya	Centre	Liberalism, Social liberalism, Turkish minority interests
Jasmine Movement (Greek: Κίνημα Γιασεμί; Turkish: Yasemin Hareketi)	Cyprus (south)	2019	Şener Levent		Left-wing	Left-wing nationalism, Unitarism, Cypriotism, Social democracy
Equality and Justice Party (French: Parti égalité et justice, PEJ; Turkish: Eşitlik ve Adalet Partisi)	France	2015	Şakir Çolak	Şakir Çolak		Turkish minority interests, Muslim minority interests, Conservatism
Alternative for Migrants (German: Alternative für Migranten, AfM; Turkish: Göçmenler için Alternatif)	Germany	2019				Turkish and Muslim minority interests
Alliance for Innovation and Justice (German: Bündnis für Innovation und Gerechtigkeit, BIG; Turkish: Yenilik ve Adalet Birliği Partisi)	Germany	2010	Haluk Yıldız	Haluk Yıldız		Turkish and Muslim minority interests
Alliance of German Democrats (German: Allianz Deutscher Demokraten, ADD; Turkish: Alman Demokratlar İttifakı)	Germany	2016	Remzi Aru	Ramazan Akbaş		Turkish and Muslim minority interests, Conservatism
Bremen Integration Party of Germany (German: Bremische Integrations-Partei Deutschlands, BIP; Turkish: Almanya Bremen Entegrasyon Partisi)	Germany	2010		Levet Albayrak		Turkish and Muslim minority interests
Party of Friendship, Equality and Peace (Greek: Κόμμα Ισότητας, Ειρήνης και Φιλίας, Κ.Ι.Ε.Φ/KIEF; Turkish: Dostluk-Eşitlik-Barış Partisi)	Greece	1991	Sâdık Ahmet	Cigdem Asafoglou	Centre	Turkish and Muslim minority interests, Social liberalism
Turkish Democratic Party of Kosovo (Turkish: Kosova Demokratik Türk Partisi, KDTP)	Kosovo	1990		Fikrim Damka	Centre-right	Turkish nationalism, Social conservatism, Economic liberalism
Denk, DENK	Netherlands	2015	Tunahan Kuzu and Selçuk Öztürk	Farid Azarkan	Left-wing	Turkish and Muslim minority interests, Multiculturalism, Social democracy
Communal Democracy Party (Turkish: Toplumcu Demokrasi Partisi, TDP)	North Cyprus	2007	Mehmet Çakıcı	Cemal Özyiğit	Centre-left	Social democracy, United Cyprus, Cypriotism
Communal Liberation Party New Forces (Turkish: Toplumcu Kurtuluş Partisi Yeni Güçler, TKP-YG)	North Cyprus	2016	Mehmet Çakıcı	Mehmet Çakıcı	Centre-left	Social democracy
Democratic Party (Turkish: Demokrat Parti, DP)	North Cyprus	1992	Serdar Denktaş	Fikri Ataoğlu	Centre-right	Turkish Cypriot nationalism, Secularism, Conservatism, Two-state solution
National Unity Party (Turkish: Ulusal Birlik Partisi, UBP)	North Cyprus	1975	Rauf Denktaş	Ersin Tatar	Centre-right	Turkish nationalism, Secularism, Two-state solution, Liberal conservatism, National conservatism
New Cyprus Party (Turkish: Yeni Kıbrıs Partisi, YKP)	North Cyprus	2004		Murat Kanatlı	Left-wing	Democratic socialism, Eco-socialism, United Cyprus
People's Party (Turkish: Halkın Partisi, HP)	North Cyprus	2016	Kudret Özersay	Kudret Özersay	Centre	Anti-corruption, Third Way, Populism
Rebirth Party (Turkish: Yeniden Doğuş Partisi, YDP)	North Cyprus	2016	Erhan Arıklı	Erhan Arıklı	Right-wing	Turkish nationalism, Conservatism, Two-state solution
Republican Turkish Party (Turkish: Cumhuriyetçi Türk Partisi, CTP)	North Cyprus	1970	Ahmet Mithat Berberoğlu	Tufan Erhürman	Centre-left	Social democracy, United Cyprus, Cypriotism
United Cyprus Party (Turkish: Birleşik Kıbrıs Partisi, BKP)	North Cyprus	2003	İzzet İzcan	İzzet İzcan	Left-wing	Socialism, United Cyprus
Democratic Party of Turks (Macedonian: Демократска партија на Турците, DPT; Turkish: Türk Demokratik Partisi)	North Macedonia	1990/92		Beycan İlyas	Centre	Turkish minority interests
Democratic Turkish Union of Romania (Romanian: Uniunea Democrată Turcă din România, UDTR; Turkish: Romanya Demokrat Türk Birliği)	Romania	1990		Osman Fedbi		Turkish minority interests

== See also ==
- Turkish minorities in the former Ottoman Empire
- Turquerie
- Turkish population
- Accession of Turkey to the European Union
- Turkey–European Union relations
- Demographics of Europe
- European Turkey
- Immigration to Europe

== Sources ==
- Abadan-Unat, Nermin (2011), Turks in Europe: From Guest Worker to Transnational Citizen, Berghahn Books, ISBN 978-1-84545-425-8.
- Akgündüz, Ahmet (2008), Labour Migration from Turkey to Western Europe, 1960-1974: A Multidisciplinary Analysis, Ashgate Publishing, ISBN 978-0-7546-7390-3
- Ansari, Humayun (2004), The Infidel Within: Muslims in Britain since 1800, C. Hurst & Co. Publishers, ISBN 978-1-85065-685-2
- Bennigsen, Alexandre; Broxup, Marie (1983), The Islamic threat to the Soviet state, Taylor & Francis, ISBN 0-7099-0619-6
- Bridgwood, Ann (1995), "Dancing the Jar: Girls' Dress and Turkish Cypriot Weddings", in Eicher, Joanne Bubolz (ed.), Dress and Ethnicity: Change Across Space and Time, Berg Publishers, ISBN 978-1-85973-003-4
- Cassia, Paul Sant (2007), Bodies of Evidence: Burial, Memory, and the Recovery of Missing Persons in Cyprus, Berghahn Books, ISBN 978-1845452285
- Clogg, Richard (2002), Minorities in Greece: Aspects of a Plural Society, C. Hurst & Co. Publishers, ISBN 1-85065-705-X
- Cole, Jeffrey (2011), Ethnic Groups of Europe: An Encyclopedia, ABC-CLIO, ISBN 978-1-59884-302-6
- Cornell, Svante E. (2001), Small Nations and Great Powers: A Study of Ethnopolitical Conflict in the Caucasus, Routledge, ISBN 0-7007-1162-7
- Eminov, Ali (1997), Turkish and other Muslim minorities in Bulgaria, C. Hurst & Co. Publishers, ISBN 978-1-85065-319-6
- Goltz, Thomas (2009), Georgia Diary: A Chronicle of War and Political Chaos in the Post-Soviet Caucasus, M.E. Sharpe, ISBN 978-0-7656-1711-8
- Guentcheva, Rossitza; Kabakchieva, Petya; Kolarski, Plamen (2003), Migrant Trends VOLUME I – Bulgaria: The social impact of seasonal migration (PDF), International Organization for Migration, archived from the original (PDF) on 1 March 2012
- Hüssein, Serkan (2007), Yesterday & Today: Turkish Cypriots of Australia, Serkan Hussein, ISBN 978-0-646-47783-1
- Ivanov, Zhivko (2007), "Economic Satisfaction and Nostalgic Laments: The Language of Bulgarian Economic Migrants After 1989 in Websites and Electronic Fora", in Gupta, Suman; Omoniyi, Tope (eds.), The Cultures of Economic Migration: International Perspectives, Ashgate Publishing, ISBN 978-0-7546-7070-4
- Kasaba, Reşat (2008), The Cambridge History of Turkey, Cambridge University Press, ISBN 978-0-521-62096-3
- Kaser, Karl (2011), The Balkans and the Near East: Introduction to a Shared History, LIT Verlag Münster, ISBN 978-3-643-50190-5
- Kliot, Nurit (2007), "Resettlement of Refugees in Finland and Cyprus: A Comparative Analysis and Possible Lessons for Israel", in Kacowicz, Arie Marcelo; Lutomski, Pawel (eds.), Population resettlement in international conflicts: a comparative study, Lexington Books, ISBN 978-0-7391-1607-4
- Kurbanov, Rafik Osman-Ogly; Kurbanov, Erjan Rafik-Ogly (1995), "Religion and Politics in the Caucasus", in Bourdeaux, Michael (ed.), The Politics of Religion in Russia and the New States of Eurasia, M.E. Sharpe, ISBN 1-56324-357-1
- Laczko, Frank; Stacher, Irene; Klekowski von Koppenfels, Amanda (2002), New challenges for Migration Policy in Central and Eastern Europe, Cambridge University Press, ISBN 978-90-6704-153-9 (Turkic Swedish: İ'svoç Túrkhlärih)
- Mancheva, Mila (2008), "Practicing Identities Across Borders: The Case of Bulgarian Turkish Labor Migrants in Germany", in Michael Peter Smith; John Eade (eds.), Transnational Ties: Cities, Migrations, and Identities, Comparative Urban and Community Research, vol. 9, Transaction Publishers, pp. 163–179, ISBN 978-1412840361
- Markova, Eugenia (2010), "Optimising migration effects: A perspective from Bulgaria", in Black, Richard; Engbersen, Godfried; Okolski, Marek; Pantiru, Cristina (eds.), A Continent Moving West?: EU Enlargement and Labour Migration from Central and Eastern Europe, Amsterdam University Press, ISBN 978-90-8964-156-4
- Panayiotopoulos, Prodromos; Dreef, Marja (2002), "London: Economic Differentiation and Policy Making", in Rath, Jan (ed.), Unravelling the rag trade: immigrant entrepreneurship in seven world cities, Berg Publishers, ISBN 978-1-85973-423-0
- Panteli, Stavros (1990), The Making of Modern Cyprus: From Obscurity to Statehood, CInterworld Publications, ISBN 0-948853-09-3
- Pentikäinen, Oskari; Trier, Tom (2004), Between Integration and Resettlement: The Meskhetian Turks, European Centre For Minority Issues
- Ryazantsev, Sergey V. (2009), "Turkish Communities in the Russian Federation" (PDF), International Journal on Multicultural Societies, 11 (2): 155–173
- Sonyel, Salahi R. (2000), "Turkish Migrants in Europe" (PDF), Perceptions, 5 (Sept–Nov 2000), Center for Strategic Research: 146–153, archived from the original (PDF) on 18 July 2011
- Savvides, Philippos K (2004), "Partition Revisited: The International Dimension and the Case of Cyprus", in Danopoulos, Constantine Panos; Vajpeyi, Dhirendra K.; Bar-Or, Amir (eds.), Civil-military relations, nation building, and national identity: comparative perspectives, Greenwood Publishing Group, ISBN 0-275-97923-7
- Şentürk, Cem (2008), West Thrace Turkish's Immigration to Europe (PDF), The Journal of International Social Research
- Strüder, Inge R. (2003), Do concepts of ethnic economies explain existing minority enterprises? The Turkish speaking economies in London (PDF), London School of Economics, ISBN 0-7530-1727-X, archived from the original (PDF) on 8 March 2016
- Tocci, Nathalie (2004), EU accession dynamics and conflict resolution: catalysing peace or consolidating partition in Cyprus?, Ashgate Publishing, ISBN 0-7546-4310-7
- Tomlinson, Kathryn (2005), "Living Yesterday in Today and Tomorrow: Meskhetian Turks in Southern Russia", in Crossley, James G; Karner, Christian (eds.), Writing History, Constructing Religion, Ashgate Publishing, ISBN 0-7546-5183-5
- Twigg, Stephen; Schaefer, Sarah; Austin, Greg; Parker, Kate (2005), Turks in Europe: Why are we afraid? (PDF), The Foreign Policy Centre, ISBN 978-1903558799, archived from the original (PDF) on 9 July 2011
- Yilmaz, Ihsan (2005), Muslim Laws, Politics and Society in Modern Nation States: Dynamic Legal Pluralisms in England, Turkey and Pakistan, Ashgate Publishing, ISBN 0-7546-4389-1
- United Nations High Commissioner for Refugees (2003), International Protection Considerations Regarding Azerbaijani Asylum-Seekers and Refugees (PDF), United Nations High Commissioner for Refugees
