= List of campaign organisations supporting Remain in the 2016 United Kingdom European Union membership referendum =

The Remain Campaign in the 2016 United Kingdom European Union membership referendum was led by Britain Stronger in Europe, a cross-party lobbying group that was declared as the official "Remain" campaign for the referendum by the Electoral Commission. However, there were a number of other groups that were involved in leading more specialist campaigns. Examples of leaflets used by the remain groups can be found on the website of the British Library of Political and Economic Science.

== Britain Stronger in Europe ==
Britain Stronger in Europe (formally The in Campaign Ltd) was a cross-party lobbying group campaigning for the United Kingdom to remain in the European Union in the United Kingdom European Union membership referendum, 2016. It was launched at the Truman Brewery in London on 12 October 2015 and declared as the official "Remain" campaign for the referendum by the Electoral Commission on 13 April 2016.

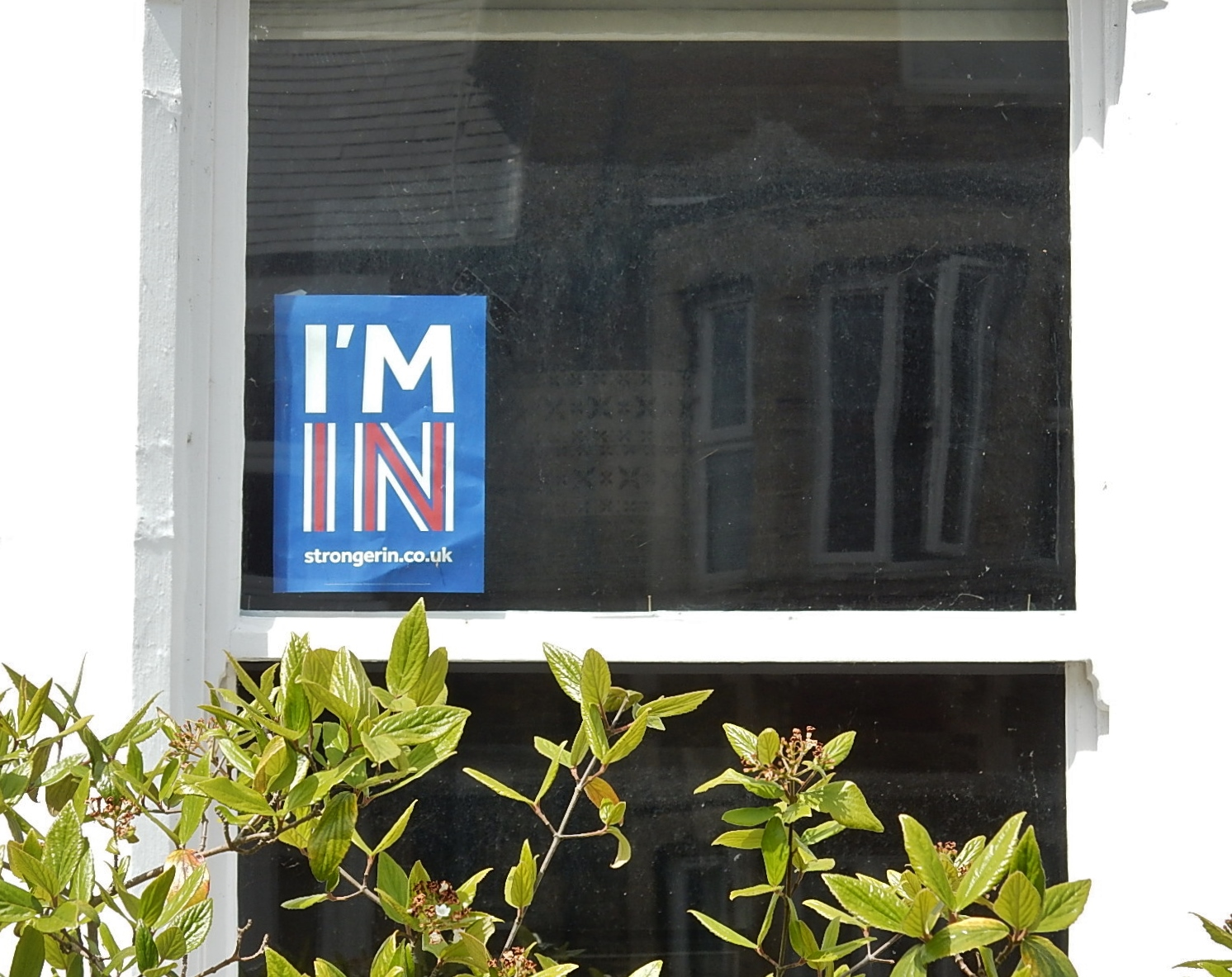
A campaign sign outside a residence in Oxford in support of The in Campaign call to vote for "Remain".

== Historical pro European groups ==
=== British Influence ===
British Influence, formally the Centre for British Influence Through Europe, was an independent, cross-party, pro-single market foreign affairs think tank founded in 2012 in the United Kingdom arguing that EU membership improves the UK's prosperity, security and society through, respectively, the European Single Market, co-operation on tackling organised crime and terrorism and through the increased peace and transparency that comes from international collaboration.

=== European Movement UK ===
European Movement UK is an independent, non-partisan, grassroots organisation working to promote the idea that the UK's brightest future lies in close partnership with its European neighbours. It is part of the European Movement International network that has been campaigning for peace, stability, better jobs and prosperity through European integration for over 70 years.

=== Federal Trust for Education and Research ===
The Federal Trust is a research institute studying the interactions between regional, national, European and global levels of government, founded in 1945 on the initiative of Sir William Beveridge, it has contributed to the study of federalism and federal systems with a particular interest in the European Union and Britain's place in it.

=== Young European Movement ===
Young European Movement UK was formed in 1972 as a non-partisan platform for pro-European opinions of the under 35s. It is volunteer run and seeks to promote European integration and a stronger European Union organising events, running campaigns and bringing education into schools.

== Campaigns by special interest group ==
=== Academics for Europe ===
Academics for Europe represents any academic that is for EU membership for the UK. They seek to unite students and more senior academics in a campaign that aims to increase awareness among the wider public of the benefits and positive impact the UK's EU membership has for academia and higher education.

=== Generation Europe ===
Generation Europe are making the case for students and young people to remain a part of a reformed European Union.

=== Healthier IN the EU ===
Healthier IN the EU was set up to represent health professionals, carers, patients and researchers who see the benefits that the EU brings to our public health every day. Many health concerns span borders from large scale environmental challenges like air pollution to more individual concerns like the millions of cases of rare diseases that no single country can hope to tackle on their own.

=== Historians for Britain IN Europe ===
Historians for Britain IN Europe "believe that a British withdrawal from the European Union would irretrievably damage Britain’s position in the world and undermine for decades to come the stability and coherence of what would once again be a divided Europe."

=== Irish for Europe ===
Irish for Europe believe "Irish people living in the UK have a lot to lose if the Brexit vote wins. For security, for the economy, and for the freedom to live, travel and work in the UK, we are better off with the UK as part of Europe".

=== Lawyers – In For Britain ===
A group of hundreds of lawyers who consider that the UK's interests are best served by remaining in the EU.

=== New Europeans ===
New Europeans is a civil rights movement based in Brussels and London which campaigns for the rights of EU citizens, in particular mobile EU citizens and the rights of third country nationals, migrants and refugees in the European Union. It was founded in 2013 by former Member of Parliament Roger Casale. After the 2016 UK's vote to leave the European Union, it moved its European operations to Brussels. New Europeans conducts research on European citizenship issues and runs grant funded programmes aimed at empowering transnational EU citizens (i.e. EU citizens who live and work outside their EU member state of origin).

In 2017, New Europeans won the Sheila McKechnie Foundation People's Choice Award for the #RightToStay campaign which led to amendments (subsequently overturned) to the Article 50 Bill in Parliament to safeguard the rights of EU 27 citizens in the UK and British citizens living in EU27 member states.

=== Out 4 In ===
Out 4 is a social media campaign aiming to promote the benefits of EU membership for the LGBT community, an inclusive, grassroots, pro-EU community.

=== Scientists for EU ===
Scientists for EU is a campaign by British scientists to keep the UK in the EU. It argues science is vital for the UK's economy and quality of life, and that science is at the heart of global and social challenges facing everyone.

=== Students for Europe ===
Students for Europe is coordinated by European Movement UK and is determined to build a large coalition of young people, across the country and across the social and political divides, who will come together to keep the UK safe, prosperous and powerful, at the heart of Europe.

=== UK Indians for Remaining in Europe ===
UK Indians for Remaining in Europe state "We are united in our belief that the UK is stronger, safer and better off as a member of the EU". "Contrary to the argument made by some, that Britain needs to leave the EU in order to strengthen its ties with Commonwealth countries, we believe that our membership of the EU helps to enhance and strengthen the UK’s partnership with countries like India".

=== Universities for Europe (Universities UK) ===
The Universities for Europe campaign, led by Universities UK, aims to show the value of EU membership to British universities and why this matters to British people. It states "The UK's membership of the European Union makes our outstanding universities even stronger".

== Campaigns by cause ==
=== Environmentalists for Europe ===
Environmentalists for Europe is chaired by Stanley Johnson, the father of Boris Johnson and former MEP, It states "standing up for Britain's place in Europe – we are stronger, cleaner and greener in the EU". They argue that it's "because of European protections that our beaches are cleaner, our countryside protected, our air cleaner and our food safer".

=== Friends of the Earth Trust ===
The Friends of the Earth Europe Trust states that "Being part of the European Union has given us: cleaner beaches and drinking water, less air pollution, safer products and protected wildlife.

=== Global Justice Now ===
Global Justice Now is a democratic social justice organisation working as part of a global movement to challenge the powerful and create a more just and equal world.

=== Third Generation Environmentalism ===
Third Generation Environmentalism believe "membership of the EU offers substantial benefits on energy and climate change that a ‘leave’ vote would require the UK to forego, making the transition to a low carbon economy more expensive and less secure".

=== Workers’ Europe ===
Workers’ Europe has the following aims: Vote against UK withdrawal from the EU, Defend migrants’ rights, Oppose racism and Campaign for a workers’ Europe based on solidarity between working people.

== EU Reformist groups ==
=== Another Europe is Possible ===
Another Europe is a campaign for a radical ‘in’ vote – building a community that is pro-EU even while it works towards building a stronger, reformed union that can bring about the radical social change our citizens need in the UK and across Europe.

=== Brand EU ===
A group that is ‘generating a people movement for the millions that believe in European unity’ and as part of its campaign to keep Britain in the EU, is tackling many of the myths that have built up around EU membership.

=== Business for new Europe ===
Britain's leading pro-European business coalition and has long been campaigning for British businesses to get involved in a more competitive and open European market. To this end they not only want Britain to remain within the EU but also make calls for reform of the EU.

== Regional Groups ==
=== Cambridge for Europe ===
Cambridge for Europe is a local, community campaign group aiming to ensure that the people of Cambridge and surrounding areas fully understand the arguments for continued membership of the EU. They believe this is an incredibly important issue to individuals, families and their communities.

=== Keep Scotland in the EU ===
Keep Scotland in the EU is a community that is determined to raise the profile of the benefits of EU membership to Scotland. Scotland is more Euro-friendly than other parts of the UK but may be pulled out by the dominance of England-based voters and Scotland will have to fight to join pro-EU voices to stay in.

=== London First ===
London First is committed to remaining within the European Union (EU), in large part because of the economic benefits of the Single Market, and sees great opportunities for Britain to lead a deepening of that market to drive jobs and growth across the country.

=== North East for Europe (NE4EU) ===
North East for Europe is committed to the UK remaining in the European Union and believes that the people of the North East of England will be hit hardest by the UK leaving the European Union. The North East economy is deeply dependent on the European market and support it receives from the European Union. If we fail to remain in the EEA we will lose our Pharmaceutical industries as they will not be able to supply the EU without that guarantee of being within the EU legal framework. If we fail to remain in the Single Market or the even the customs union, key businesses in the North East will relocate over time to the EU for more favourable conditions. If we fail to maintain Freedom of Movement the ageing North East population will not have the young people it needs to deliver the society and economy it needs.

=== St Andrews for Europe (SAfE) ===
A group run for the people of St Andrews – both students and residents founded to increase awareness of the EU debate and EU referendum, with a pro-EU membership objective, supported by the Students for Europe group as well as the Britain Stronger in Europe Campaign, a cross-party aimed at preserving the strength of our European Union.

=== Wales 4 Europe ===
Wales for Europe believes that Wales benefits greatly from the EU including Objective One aid packages, tariff free trade providing a much needed boost to Welsh businesses and protection for workers. They also promote the EU's benefits for the environment.

== Groups by political parties ==
=== Conservatives Europe Group ===
The Conservative Group for Europe believes in a hard-headed promotion of British interests in Europe as a committed participant.

=== Conservatives In ===
Members of the Conservative Party supporting the UK remaining in the European Union. Conservatives In believe the UK has the best of both worlds with its "special status" in the EU. The campaign has the backing of the majority of Conservative MPs. Conservatives In was launched by Prime Minister David Cameron on 24 February 2016.

=== Labour In for Britain ===
The Labour Party's adopted position is to support the UK remaining in the EU. Labour In is the party's official campaign pushing for a remain vote in the British referendum on EU membership. Only 7 Labour MPs back a leave vote. Labour leader Jeremy Corbyn has warned that a Brexit vote would damage workers' rights. Labour In was led by Alan Johnson MP and was launched on 1 December 2015.

=== Labour Movement for Europe ===
The Labour Movement for Europe is a Socialist Society affiliated to the Labour Party whose aim is to improve and broaden the understanding of the European Union and its potential throughout the wider Labour movement and the United Kingdom. It is the home of the pro-Europeans in the Labour and trade union movement.

=== Greens For A Better Europe ===
Greens For A Better Europe is The Green Party of England and Wales campaign backing continued EU membership for the UK. The Green Party wants Britain to remain a part of the EU because "we believe that we flourish when we work together on the shared challenges we face".

=== #INtogether (Liberal Democrats) ===
INtogether was the official Liberal Democrat Party campaign supporting the UK's membership of the EU. The Liberal Democrats are generally seen as the most pro-EU political party in British politics, with every Lib Dem MP, MEP, MSP, Wales AM and London AM supporting EU membership.

== Others ==
=== InFacts ===
InFacts was founded by business journalist Hugo Dixon and describes itself as "a journalistic enterprise making the fact-based case for Britain to remain in the European Union."

=== Hug A Brit ===
Hug A Brit was a social media campaign organised prior to the 2016 referendum by a group of continental Europeans living in London who wanted to highlight the deep human connections that had resulted from the European integration under the EU and cut through the hostile and negative undertones of many other referendum campaigns. They posted hugs between themselves and their fellow non-British EU citizens hugging British friends, family members, strangers, icons of British culture and in a few cases symbols of Britain to express human bonds, sympathy, fear of loss and the plea not to be made foreigners in their adopted home country. The campaign went viral and soon thousands of people from around the world had posted pictures of themselves on social media using the hashtag #hugabrit to show support.

=== Pro Europa ===
Pro Europa runs a broad campaign based on the EU's benefits for jobs, trade, consumer rights, peace and democracy, collective power to get better trade deals and power to take on global multi-national giants that are bigger than most individual countries.

=== Say Yes to Europe ===
Say Yes to Europe is dedicated to traditional, popular, grassroots action. They focus on sharing information on the benefits of EU membership for citizen rights and also on ensuring the referendum is open to all residents of the UK.

=== Stay in Europe ===
A campaign dedicated to promoting the benefits to the UK of EU membership and why it is better to stay ‘in’. A key point is the common problems we share that can be better addressed if we unite with our European neighbours.

=== UK to Stay in the EU ===
Aims to engage 50,000 volunteers to collectively win 15 million votes to remain in the EU at the upcoming referendum. They estimate 15 million is the minimum number required to secure a victory. They are a purely grassroots organisation.

=== Wake Up Europe ===
Wake Up Europe is a campaign set up by the Wake Up Foundation, to facilitate a transnational debate on the future of Europe inspired by the documentary The Great European Disaster Movie. They believe in the founding principles of the EU and wish for it to continue but they also believe in the need for reform and to 'rescue the EU from itself'. They aim to empower ordinary people – in the UK and the rest of Europe – to come together and discuss these issues so that the future of the EU is taken out of the hands of political and media elites.

=== We Are Europe ===
We are Europe gathers and mobilises the energy of eight European events, both festivals and forums, supporting European culture, high artistic standards, cultural innovation and creation. This common project aims to develop a European and prospective vision of electronic and digital cultures, cultural entrepreneurship, innovation and new technology.
