= Tessa Szyszkowitz =

Austrian historian, journalist, and author

Tessa Szyszkowitz (born 1967 in Stuttgart) is an Austrian historian, journalist and author.

== Career ==
After finishing her studies Szyszkowitz worked for the German Newspaper Süddeutsche Zeitung, the Austrian Radio channel ORF Ö1, the Austrian Newspaper Kurier and the Arbeiter Zeitung. From 1991 - 1994 she was editor for the magazin Profil. From 1994 bis 1998 she was Middle East Correspondent in Jerusalem for Profil, Kurier and the Swiss Magazin Facts. From 1998 until 2002 she was EU Correspondent for Format in Brussels. 2002 until 2010 she was Correspondent in Moscow for the magazin Profil and the Swiss Newspaper NZZ am Sonntag. She has lived and worked in London as correspondent for Profil, for the German Magazin Cicero and the Newspaper Falter.

In 2007 she completed her PhD as Historian at the University of Vienna, topic of the publication was nationalism and terrorism. She published several books about terrorism in Russia, Europe and the Middle East. Since 2013 she writes a bilingual blog and is frequently in the media and a regular commentator on radio and television on topics such as European-, Austrian-, and British politics and Brexit.

In 2016 Tessa Szyszkowitz founded the pro-European social media campaign Hug A Brit together with Birgit Maass, Paul Varga and others in order to keep Britain in the European Union. The campaign went viral in April 2016 and added a human touch to the Brexit campaign which divided the United Kingdom. Hug A Brit was nominated for the Europe State Award 2016 by the Austrian ministry for Foreign and European Affairs. The Europe State Award is an acknowledgement of initiatives that contribute towards promoting understanding of the EU and cohesion in Europe.

Since 2017 Szyszkowitz is curating a lecture series called Philoxenia at the Bruno Kreisky Forum for international dialogue in Vienna: "Philoxenia, the concept of hospitality, was cultivated in antique Greece. The love of the other seems to be especially necessary today, when populist movements threaten to eclipse rational thinking. It seems urgent to find alternatives to fear and xenophobia as driving forces of political processes." Among her guests were Pankaj Mishra, Lisa Nandy, Fintan O'Toole, Elleke Boehmer, Jon Lansman, Annalisa Piras, Philippe Sands, Karin von Hippel and others. The lectures are usually in English.

In 2018 Szyszkowitz published Echte Engländer. Britannien und der Brexit. She argues that Brexit showed a deep identity crisis of the British society. „The author manages to offer a comprehensive psychogram of the British nation", writes a reviewer in the German weekly Der Freitag. The loss of the British Empire could never be properly compensated, Szyszkowitz writes, especially not with a Union of 28 Member States - among which the United Kingdom was only one of many nations with equal rights. The consequences of Brexit should not be underestimated, the author argues: „Everything holy to British people is being questioned because of the exit from the European Union. Democracy, parliament, tolerance and even the proverbial calm. Old certainties are not relevant any longer. The Brexit-vote 2016 showed that British people are not sure anymore who they are", Szyszkowitz writes. A reviewer in the German daily Sueddeutsche Zeitung agrees: „The conclusions of the author are logical and correct."

Szyszkowitz also contributes to Carnegie Europe and the Royal United Services Institute for Security and Defence Studies. She hosted Paul Lendvai's talk and interview at "Wiener Vorlesungen" in October 2024.

== Publications ==
- Europe confronts Terrorism, chapter Germany by Tessa Szyszkowitz, published by Karin von Hippel, Palgrave MacMillion, 2005, ISBN 978-0-230-52459-0
- Trauma and terror: On Palestinian and Chechen nationalism, Vienna, Cologne, 2008, ISBN 978-3-205-77704-5
- The new Russians: The generation after Putin, Picus Verlag, Vienna, 2010, ISBN 978-3-85452-668-1
- The freedom fighters: Arafat secret envoy Issam Sartawi, Picus Verlag, Vienna, 2011, ISBN 978-3-85452-678-0
- Echte Engländer - Real Englishmen / Britain and Brexit, Picus Verlag, Vienna, September 2018, ISBN 978-3-7117-2069-6
- The flipside of Brextremism, Essay in: Do They Mean Us? – The Foreign Correspondents' View of Brexit, Edited by John Mair and Neil Fowler, January 2019, ISBN 978-1793477361
- Essay in Brexit - Farce und Tragödie. Published by Institute for Human Sciences (IWM) by Ivan Vejvoda, Oktober 2019, ISBN 9783709203958
