= Party of Friendship, Equality and Peace =

Party of Friendship, Equality and Peace Κόμμα Ισότητας, Ειρήνης και Φιλίας Dostluk-Eşitlik-Barış Partisi
- Leader: Cigdem Asafoglou
- Founder: Sadik Achmet
- Founded: 13 September 1991
- Ideology: Turkish minority rights Regionalism
- Political position: Centre
- European affiliation: European Free Alliance (observer)
- Hellenic Parliament: 0 / 300
- European Parliament: 0 / 21

Website
- debpartisi.org

The Party of Friendship, Equality and Peace (Greek: Κόμμα Ισότητας, Ειρήνης και Φιλίας, abbr. Κ.Ι.Ε.Φ., KIEF; Turkish: Dostluk-Eşitlik-Barış Partisi, DEBP) is a Greek ethnic party founded to represent the interests of Turks of Western Thrace.

== Overview ==
The party was created on 13 September 1991 by Sadik Achmet, who presided over it until his death in 1995. Achmet was succeeded by his widow Isik Achmet (Işık Ahmet) who led until 1999. The party was then led by Achmet Chatziosman until 2007 when Chatziosman was elected member of the Greek Parliament for the Panhellenic Socialist Movement (PASOK). The next chairman, Moustafa Bosnak, was replaced in July 2010 by Moustafa Ali Tsavous. Achmet Chatziosman was elected in 2002 and 2006 for the Rhodope Prefecture on a common PASOK-Synaspismós list and was vice-prefect from 2002 to 2007.

The 5th Ordinary General Congress of the party took place on 5 January 2019 at the Party Headquarters. Tsidem Asafoglou, the only candidate in the congress that took place in the party's headquarters, was elected as the new party president.

For the 2024 European elections, the party has one candidate representing the ethnic Macedonian minority in Greece, Eugenia Natsoulidou.

== Notable members ==
- Sadik Achmet
- Xasan Patsaman
- Ismail Molla
- Achmet Faikoglou
- Achmet Chatziosman
- Tsetin Mantatzi
- Galip Galip

== Electoral results ==
=== Hellenic Parliament ===
Results, 1996–2019
Year	Votes	%	Mandates
1996	supported PASOK	–	1
2000	supported PASOK	–	2
2004	supported ND	–	1
2007	supported PASOK	–	2
2009	supported PASOK	–	2
2012	supported DISY	–	–
2012	supported DIMAR	–	–
2019	supported PASOK and SYRIZA	–	–

=== European Parliament ===
Party of Friendship, Equality and Peace emerged as the first party in Xanthi and Rhodope in 2019 European Parliament elections.

European Parliament
Election	Votes	%	±pp	Seats won	+/−	Rank	Leader	EP Group
2014	41,433	0.75%	New	0 / 21	New	16th	Moustafa Ali Tsavous	−
2019	40,245	0.71%	▼0.04	0 / 21	0	18th	Tsidem Asafoglou	−
2024	28,470	0.72%	▲0.01	0 / 21	0	15th	Tsidem Asafoglou	−

Although unable to send MEPs due to 3% national threshold, DEB emerged as the first party in Xanthi and Rhodope regional units in both 2014 and 2019 European elections, drawing attention. In 2019 elections, DEB received 38% of the votes in Rhodope regional unit and 25.24% of the votes in Xanthi regional unit. DEB also received 1.30% of the votes in Evros regional unit. While in the overall region of Eastern Macedonia and Thrace, the party came in as the 3rd biggest party after top 2 national parties New Democracy and Syriza. Other regions outside Eastern Macedonia and Thrace where votes were cast for DEB were listed as Dodecanese, Thessaloniki, and Athens.

== Other Turkish minority parties in South-Eastern Europe ==
- Movement for Rights and Freedoms (Bulgaria)
- Turkish Democratic Party of Kosovo (Kosovo)
- Democratic Party of Turks (Republic of North Macedonia)
- Democratic Turkish Union of Romania (Romania)
