= Tsigdem Asafoglou =

Greek politician (born 1987)

Tsigdem Asafoglou (Greek: Τσιγδέμ Ασάφογλου Tsigdém Asáfoglou; Turkish: Çiğdem Asafoğlu; born 17 November 1987) is a Greek politician, member of the Thracian Turkish community, and currently president of the Party of Friendship, Equality and Peace, representing the Muslim Minority of Western Thrace.

Asafoglou was born on 17 November 1987 in Xanthi, Greece. She studied at Limachers Primary School and 1st State High School in Xanthi. She completed her university education at the Department of Philosophy and Pedagogy of the Aristotle University of Thessaloniki. After working actively for 3 years as a member of the FEP Party she was elected as the chairman in the party congress on 5 January 2019. She is married and the mother of one child.
