= Sadik Achmet =

Turkish doctor of medicine and politician

Σαδίκ Αχμέτ Sadík Achmét
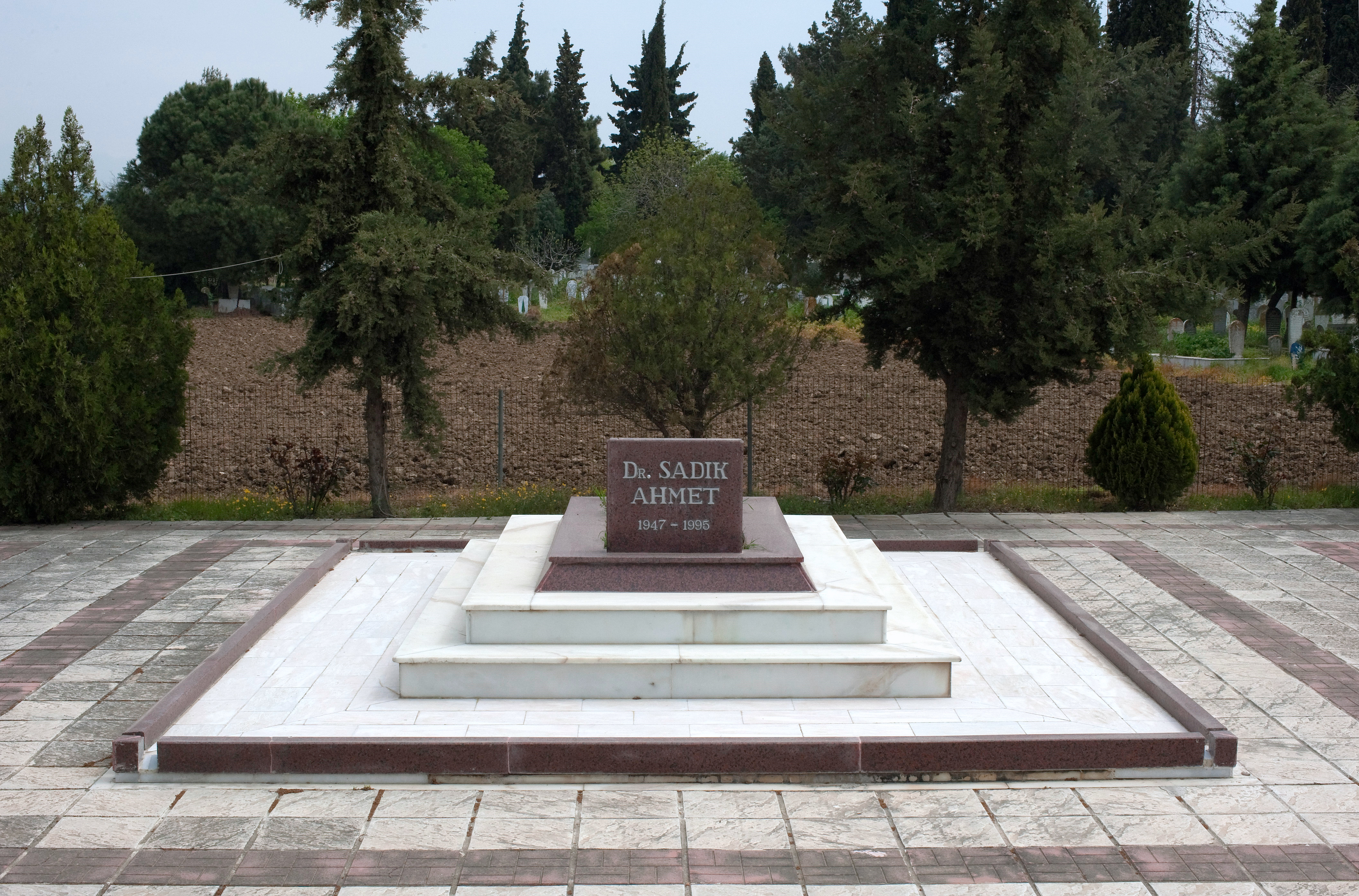
- Grave of Sadik Achmet in Komotini
- Born: 1 January 1947; Agra, Western Thrace
- Died: 24 July 1995 (aged 48) near Sostis, Western Thrace
- Other name: Sâdık Ahmet
- Occupations: Doctor of Medicine, Politician
- Political party: Party of Friendship, Equality and Peace

Sadik Achmet (Greek: Σαδίκ Αχμέτ Sadík Achmét, Turkish: Sâdık Ahmet, 1 January 1947 – 24 July 1995) was a Greek physician and politician of Turkish descent. He founded the Party of Friendship, Equality and Peace.

== Early life ==
Achmet was born in the village of Agra, just north of Fillyra. He attended high school in Komotini and then studied medicine at the Aristotle University of Thessaloniki.

== Political career ==
He was elected to the Greek parliament in June 1989. On 24 January 1990 he was sentenced to eighteen months in prison due to his declarations that the members of the Muslim minority in Thrace were Turks, and because he referred to himself as a Turk in his election pamphlet. After a two-day trial he was found guilty of slander and misinformation by a Greek court and sentenced to 18 months in prison. Leaving the courtroom he stated "I am being taken to prison only because I am a Turk. If being a Turk is a crime, I repeat here that I am a Turk and I will remain so". His sentence was reduced to 15 months on appeal and ultimately he was released after 2 months, in time to run in the April 1990 elections, where he was again elected to the Greek parliament.

Achmet's political rise was largely due to the intervention of the Turkish government, the Turkish Secret Services and the Turkish Consulate in Komotini, which considered him a spearhead of Turkish interests in Western Thrace, and was achieved through various means, including threats and reprisals against rival minority candidates and voters in Thrace by the Turkish state. Achmet considered himself the de facto "Leader of the Western Thrace Turkish minority". However at the time of his death he was believed to have lost the backing of Turkish institutions due to his erratic behaviour, including one incident where he publicly insulted the Turkish consul in Komotini.

== Death ==
Sadik Achmet died in a controversial car accident when his car drove into a tractor just outside the village of Sostis. Many Turkish politicians asserted that his death was a staged political assassination and not an accident. Professor Vemund Aarbakke, one of the world's foremost experts on Western Thrace, writes: "In Turkish nationalist circles, it is referred to routinely as a suspicious (şüpheli/şaibeli) accident. I have also heard Christians express the opinion that he was “bumped off” (τον έφαγαν). This is most certainly wrong. I do not dispute that he had many enemies and had received death threats on several occasions. The accident, however, was due to a combination of unfortunate circumstances. Sadık was returning late from a circumcision ceremony when a tractor entered the road at a place with limited visibility. Sadık drove fast and could not stop in time. Another factor was that he drove the smaller car of his wife. If they had taken his Mercedes, the accident would probably not have been fatal." His colleagues and supporters also accepted that his death was a tragic accident, as did the Turkish consul at the time.

== Legacy ==
Since his death, numerous bridges, roads, parks, schools, hospitals and stadiums in Turkey have been named or renamed for him. Notably, the avenue in front of the Ecumenical Patriarchate in Istanbul is named after Achmet, as is the avenue in front of the Turkish Foreign Ministry in Ankara. His legacy among the Muslim Minority of Western Thrace is more mixed, with many leading members of the community describing him as "greedy, callous, unscrupulous, and incompetent."

== Sources ==
- Achmet, Sadik, profile on his party page.
