= Hug A Brit =

Social media campaign in response to Brexit

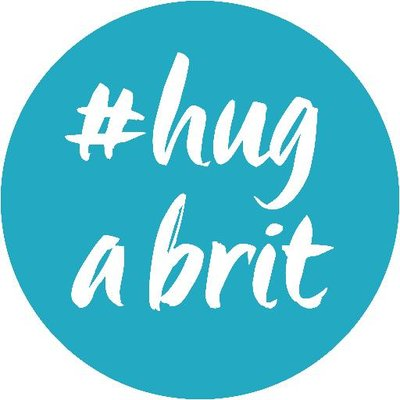
Hug A Brit logo

The Hug A Brit movement was an independent social media campaign around the British EU membership referendum in June 2016.

== Overview ==
Founded by a group of Londoners with continental roots, the aim was to send the British people a "love bomb" to make them stay in the European Union. Europeans were hugging Brits and posting images of it on social media to encourage a Remain vote in the referendum. Photos and videos of those hugs were shared via Twitter, Facebook, Instagram and also became very popular in the traditional media in Britain and internationally. The campaign went viral just before the referendum in April and May 2016. Despite a strong voice in the media, the campaign was not able to turn around the vote, which resulted in an overall decision to leave the EU.

== Positioning ==
While the official Remain and Leave campaigns focused mainly on the economy and migration, Hug A Brit became a significant part of the referendum campaigns by putting positive emotions in the centre. Instead of negative campaigning and scaremongering, the movement focused on personal stories and relationships and was therefore recognised widely as a positive outlier.

== Nigel Farage ==
While Hug A Brit strongly advocated for a Remain vote, it did not exclude Eurosceptics from hugging. On April 15 Birgit Maass, Co-Initiator of the movement, hugged leading Leave campaigner Nigel Farage live on BBC Television.

== Founding members ==
Hug A Brit was founded by a group of European nationals living in the United Kingdom, without political affiliations to any party nor support or external funding.

After the EU referendum, the group's activity decreased. It is not known if further campaigns are planned around the British exit negotiations with the European Union.

== The Europe State Award ==
#Hugabrit was nominated for the Europe State Award 2016 by the Austrian ministry for Foreign and European Affairs. The Europe State Award is an acknowledgement of initiatives that contribute towards promoting understanding of the EU and cohesion in Europe.
