= Preglovo =

- Village
- Преглово
- Location within North Macedonia
- Coordinates: 41°28′N 21°07′E
- Country: North Macedonia
- Region: Southwestern
- Municipality: Plasnica

Population (2021)
  - Total: 928
- Time zone: UTC+1 (CET)
  - Summer (DST): UTC+2 (CEST)
- Car plates: MB
- Website: .

Preglovo (Macedonian: Преглово) is a village in the municipality of Plasnica, North Macedonia.

== Demographics ==
The village is attested in the 1467/68 Ottoman tax registry (defter) for the Nahiyah of Kırçova. The village had a total of 30 houses, excluding bachelors (mucerred).

Preglovo has traditionally been inhabited by a Turk population.

As of the 2021 census, Preglovo had 928 residents with the following ethnic composition:

- Turks 916
- Persons for whom data are taken from administrative sources 6
- Albanians 6

According to the 2002 census, the village had a total of 1,079 inhabitants. Ethnic groups in the village include:

- Turks 1,070
- Albanians 3
- Macedonians 1
- Others 5
