= Turks in the Balkans =

Turkish ethnic minorities living in the Balkans

The Balkan Turks (Turkish: Balkan Türkleri) or Rumelian Turks (Turkish: Rumeli Türkleri) are the Turkish people who have been living in the Balkans since Ottoman rule, as well as their descendants who still live in the region today. The Turks are officially recognized as a minority in Bosnia and Herzegovina, Bulgaria, Croatia, Kosovo, North Macedonia, and Romania; in Greece the Turkish minority is recognized as "Greek Muslims". Furthermore, the Turkish language has minority language status in Bosnia and Herzegovina, North Macedonia, and Romania.

Turkish communities in the Balkans
State or region	Community	Current status
Bosnia and Herzegovina	Bosnian Turks	The 1991 Bosnian census found that there was a minority of 267 Turks, while the census of 2013 gave a number of 1,108.
Bulgaria	Bulgarian Turks	In the 2011 Bulgarian census, which did not receive a response regarding ethnicity from the total population, 588,318 people, or 8.8% of the self-appointed responders, determined their ethnicity as Turkish; while the latest census which provided answers from the entire population, the 2001 census, recorded 746,664 Turks, or 9.4% of the population. Other estimates suggests that there are 750,000.
Albania	Albanian Turks	In the 2011 census in Albania, more than 800 people registered Turkish as their first language.
Croatia	Croatian Turks	According to the 2001 Croatian census the Turkish minority numbered 300. More recent estimates have suggested that there are 2,000 Turks in Croatia.
Rhodes (in Greece); Kos (in Greece)	Dodecanese Turks	Some 5,000 Turks live in the Dodecanese islands of Rhodes and Kos.
Hungary	Turks in Hungary	In the 2001 census, 1,565 people declared themselves to be of “Ottoman Turkish” ethnicity, and 91 of “Romanian-Turkish” ethnicity.
Kosovo	Kosovan Turks	There are approximately 30,000 Kosovar Turks living in Kosovo, mostly in Mamusha, Prizren, and Pristina.
North Macedonia	Macedonian Turks	The 2002 Macedonian census stated that there were 77,959 Macedonian Turks, forming about 4% of the total population and constituting a majority in Centar Župa and Plasnica. However, academic estimates suggest that they actually number between 170,000 and 200,000. Furthermore, about 200,000 Macedonian Turks migrated to Turkey during World War I and World War II due to persecutions and discrimination.
Serbia	Serbian Turks	There were 647 Serbian Turks living in the country according to the 2011 census.
Montenegro	Montenegrin Turks	There were 104 Montenegrin Turks according to the 2011 census. The majority left their homes and migrated to Turkey in the 1900s.
Northern Dobruja (in Romania)	Romanian Turks	There were 28,226 Romanian Turks living in the country according to the 2011 Romanian census. However, academic estimates suggest that the community numbers between 55,000 and 80,000.
Western Thrace (in Greece)	Western Thrace Turks	The Greek government refers to the community as "Greek Muslims" and does not mention specifically the ethnicity of the Muslims (including Turks) in Western Thrace. Traditionally, academics have suggested that the Western Thrace Muslims number about 120,000–130,000, although more recent estimates suggest that the community numbers 150,000. Between 300,000 and 400,000 immigrated to Turkey since 1923.
East Thrace	East Thrace Turks	The only remaining part of the Balkans which is part of Turkey, significant portion of the population is made up of Muhacirs like Bosniaks, Albanians or Pomaks.

Historically, from the Ottoman conquest until the 19th century, ethnically non-Turkish, especially South Slavic Muslims of the Balkans were referred to in the local languages as Turks (term for Muslims). This usage is common in literature, such as in the works of Ivan Mažuranić and Petar II Petrović-Njegoš. Today, the largest mainly Muslim Slavic ethnic group is known as the Bosniaks followed by Pomaks.

== See also ==
- Turkish population
- Muhacirs
- Turks in Europe

== Bibliography ==
- Abrahams, Fred (1996). A Threat to "Stability": Human Rights Violations in Macedonia. Human Rights Watch. ISBN 1-56432-170-3.
- Brozba, Gabriela (2010). Between Reality and Myth: A Corpus-based Analysis of the Stereotypic Image of Some Romanian Ethnic Minorities. GRIN Verlag. ISBN 978-3-640-70386-9.
- Clogg, Richard (2002). Minorities in Greece. Hurst & Co. ISBN 1-85065-706-8.
- Constantin, Daniela L.; Goschin, Zizi; Dragusin, Mariana (2008). "Ethnic entrepreneurship as an integration factor in civil society and a gate to religious tolerance. A spotlight on Turkish entrepreneurs in Romania". Journal for the Study of Religions and Ideologies. 7 (20): 28–41.
- Elsie, Robert (2010). Historical Dictionary of Kosovo. Scarecrow Press. ISBN 978-0-8108-7231-8.
- Ergener, Reşit (2002). About Turkey: Geography, Economy, Politics, Religion, and Culture. Pilgrims Process. ISBN 0-9710609-6-7.
- Evans, Thammy (2010). Macedonia. Bradt Travel Guides. ISBN 978-1-84162-297-2.
- Phinnemore, David (2006). The EU and Romania: Accession and Beyond. The Federal Trust for Education & Research. ISBN 1-903403-78-2.
- Republic of Macedonia State Statistical Office (2005). Republic of Macedonia – State Statistical Office (PDF) (Report). Republic of Macedonia – State Statistical Office.
- National Institute of Statistics (2011). Comunicat de presă privind rezultatele provizorii ale Recensământului Populaţiei şi Locuinţelor – 2011 (PDF) (Report). Romania-National Institute of Statistics. Archived from the original (PDF) on 2019-08-02.
- Sosyal, Levent (2011). "Turks". In Cole, Jeffrey (ed.). Ethnic Groups of Europe: An Encyclopedia. ABC-CLIO. ISBN 978-1598843026.
- Whitman, Lois (1990). Destroying ethnic identity: the Turks of Greece. Human Rights Watch. ISBN 0-929692-70-5.
