= Plasnica =

Plasnica Пласница Plasnitsa
- Village
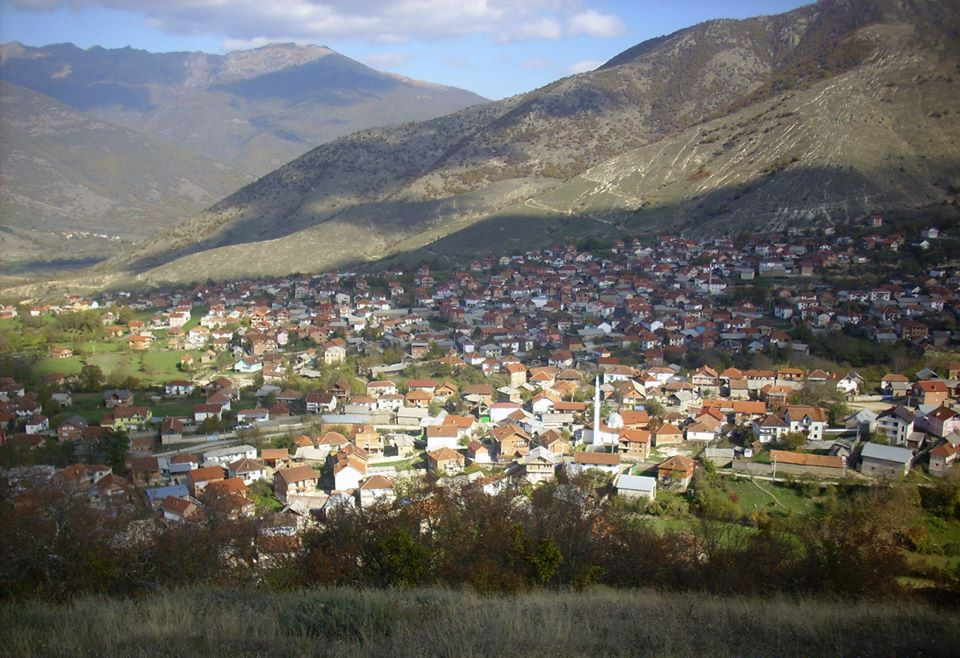
- View of Plasnica

- Location within North Macedonia
- Coordinates: 41°28′N 21°07′E
- Country: North Macedonia
- Region: Southwestern
- Municipality: Plasnica

Population (2021)
  - Total: 2,115

Official Language(s)
  - primary: Macedonian
  - secondary: Turkish
- Time zone: UTC+1 (CET)
  - Summer (DST): UTC+2 (CEST)
- Vehicle registration: KA
- Website: .

Plasnica (Macedonian: Пласница, Turkish: Plasnitsa) is a village and seat of the municipality of Plasnica, North Macedonia.

== Demographics ==
The village is attested in the 1467/68 Ottoman tax registry (defter) for the Nahiyah of Kırçova. The village had a total of 32 houses, excluding bachelors (mucerred).

Historically, Plasnica was inhabited by a Turk population.

As of the 2021 census, Plasnica had 2,115 residents with the following ethnic composition:

- Turks 2,055
- Persons for whom data are taken from administrative sources 57
- Others 3

According to the 2002 census, the village had a total of 2,288 inhabitants. Ethnic groups in the village include:

- Turks 2,250
- Macedonians 2
- Albanians 7
- Others 29
