= Plasnica Municipality =

Municipality of North Macedonia

Coordinates: 41.47°N 21.23°E

Plasnica Municipality Општина Пласница Plasniça Belediyesi
- Municipality
- Flag

- Country: North Macedonia
- Region: Southwestern
- Municipal seat: Plasnica

Government
  - Mayor: Alija Jaoski (DUI)

Area
  - Total: 54.44 km^{2} (21.02 sq mi)

Population
  - Total: 4,222
- Time zone: UTC+1 (CET)
- Official languages: Macedonian, Turkish
- Vehicle registration: MB

Plasnica (Macedonian: Пласница, Turkish: Plasniça) is a municipality in western North Macedonia. Plasnica is also the name of the village where the municipal seat is found. Plasnica Municipality is part of the Southwestern Statistical Region. It is particularly noteworthy in having a mostly ethnic Turkish population.

== Geography ==
The municipality borders Makedonski Brod Municipality to the northeast, Kruševo Municipality to the southeast, Kičevo Municipality to the southwest, west and northwest.

== Demographics ==
According to the 2021 North Macedonia census, this municipality has 4,222 inhabitants.

	2002		2021	
	Number	%	Number	%
TOTAL	4,545	100	4,222	100
Turks	4,446	97.82	4,101	97.13
Albanians	20	0.44	13	0.31
Macedonians	34	0.75	9	0.22
Bosniaks			1	0.02
Other / Undeclared / Unknown	45	0.99	1	0.02
Persons for whom data are taken from administrative sources			97	2.3
