= Turkish people =

Turkic ethnic group

Turks
Türkler (Turkish)
- Map of the Turkish people around the world

Total population
- c. 80 million

Regions with significant populations
- Turkey 60,000,000 to 65,000,000; Northern Cyprus 315,000^{a}
Other countries
Germany	3,000,000 to over 7,000,000
France	over 1,000,000
Netherlands	500,000
United Kingdom	500,000^{b}
Austria	360,000–500,000
United States	252,256-500,000
Belgium	250,000–500,000
Australia	320,000^{c}
Kazakhstan	250,000^{d}
Sweden	185,000^{e}
Russia	109,883–150,000
Azerbaijan	130,000^{d}
Switzerland	120,000
Canada	over 100,000
Denmark	67,885
Kyrgyzstan	55,000^{d}
Italy	50,000
Uzbekistan	25,000
Norway	16,500
Ukraine	8,844–15,000
Turkmenistan	13,000
Finland	10,000
Poland	5,000
New Zealand	3,600–4,600^{f}
Ireland	2,000–3,000
Brazil	2,000–6,300
Liechtenstein	1,000
Turks in the Arab world:
Iraq	3,000,000–5,000,000
Syria	1,000,000–1,700,000^{g}
Libya	1,000,000–1,400,000^{h}
Egypt	100,000–1,500,000
Lebanon	280,000^{i}
Saudi Arabia	270,000–350,000
Yemen	10,000–100,000
Jordan	50,000
Turks in the Balkans:
Bulgaria	588,318–800,000
North Macedonia	77,959–200,000
Greece	49,000–130,000
Romania	28,226–80,000
Kosovo	18,738–60,000
Bosnia and Herzegovina	1,108
Serbia	850
Albania	714
Croatia	367
Montenegro	1,816

Languages
- Turkish

Religion
- Predominantly Islam (Sunnism, Alevism, non-denominational); Minority Irreligion

Related ethnic groups
- Azerbaijanis, Turkmens, and other Turkic peoples
- ^{a} Approximately 200,000 are Turkish Cypriots and the remainder are Turkish settlers.^{b} Turkish Cypriots form 300,000 to 400,000 of the Turkish-British population. Mainland Turks are the next largest group, followed by Turkish Bulgarians and Turkish Romanians. Turkish minorities have also settled from Iraq, Greece, etc.^{c} Turkish Australians include 200,000 mainland Turks, 120,000 Turkish Cypriots, and smaller Turkish groups from Bulgaria, Greece, North Macedonia, Syria, and Western Europe.^{d} These figures only include Turkish Meskhetians. Official censuses are considered unreliable because many Turks have incorrectly been registered as "Azeri", "Kazakh", "Kyrgyz", and "Uzbek".^{e} The Turkish Swedish community includes 150,000 mainland Turks, 30,000 Turkish Bulgarians, 5,000 Turkish Macedonians, and smaller groups from Iraq and Syria.^{f} Including 2,000–3,000 mainland Turks and 1,600 Turkish Cypriots.^{g} This includes the Turkish-speaking minority only (i.e. 30% of Syrian Turks). Estimates including the Arabized Turks range between 3.5 and 6 million.^{h} Includes the Kouloughlis who are descendants of the old Turkish ruling class.^{i} Includes 80,000 Turkish Lebanese and 200,000 recent refugees from Syria.

Turks (Turkish: Türkler), or Turkish people, are the largest Turkic ethnic group, comprising the majority of the population of Turkey and Northern Cyprus. They generally speak the various Turkish dialects. In addition, centuries-old ethnic Turkish communities still exist across other former territories of the Ottoman Empire. Article 66 of the Constitution of Turkey defines a Turk as anyone who is a citizen of the Turkish state. While the legal use of the term Turkish as it pertains to a citizen of Turkey is different from the term's ethnic definition, the majority of the Turkish population (an estimated 70 to 75 percent) are of Turkish ethnicity. The vast majority of Turks are Sunni Muslims, with a notable minority practicing Alevism.

The ethnic Turks can therefore be distinguished by a number of cultural and regional variants, but do not function as separate ethnic groups. In particular, the culture of the Anatolian Turks in Asia Minor has underlain and influenced the Turkish nationalist ideology. Other Turkish groups include the Rumelian Turks (also referred to as Balkan Turks) historically located in the Balkans; Turkish Cypriots on the island of Cyprus, Meskhetian Turks originally based in Meskheti, Georgia; and ethnic Turkish people across the Middle East, where they are also called Turkmen or Turkoman in the Levant (e.g. Iraqi Turkmen, Syrian Turkmen, Lebanese Turkmen, etc.). Consequently, the Turks form the largest minority group in Bulgaria, the second largest minority group in Iraq, Libya, North Macedonia, and Syria, and the third largest minority group in Kosovo. They also form substantial communities in the Western Thrace region of Greece, the Dobruja region of Romania, the Akkar region in Lebanon, as well as minority groups in other post-Ottoman Balkan and Middle Eastern countries. The mass immigration of Turks also led to them forming the largest ethnic minority group in Austria, Denmark, Germany, and the Netherlands. There are also Turkish communities in other parts of Europe as well as in North America, Australia, and the post-Soviet states. Turks are the 13th largest ethnic group in the world.

Turkic peoples from Central Asia settled in Anatolia in the 11th century, through the conquests of the Seljuk Turks. This began the transformation of the region, which had been a largely Greek-speaking region after previously being Hellenized, into a Turkish and Muslim-majority one. The Ottoman Empire expanded into parts of West Asia, Southeastern Europe, and North Africa over the course of several centuries. In the 19th and early 20th centuries, persecution of Muslims during the Ottoman contraction and in the Russian Empire resulted in large-scale loss of life and mass migration into modern-day Turkey from the Balkans, Caucasus, and Crimea; the immigrants were both Turkish and non-Turkish people, and overwhelmingly Muslim. The empire lasted until the end of World War I, when it was defeated by the Allies and partitioned. Following the Turkish War of Independence that ended with the Turkish National Movement retaking much of the territory lost to the Allies, the Movement ended the Ottoman Empire on 1 November 1922 and proclaimed the Republic of Turkey on 29 October 1923.

== Etymology and definition ==
=== Etymology ===
As an ethnonym, the etymology of Turk is still unknown. In Chinese sources, Turk appears as Tujue (Chinese: 突厥; Wade–Giles: T'u-chüe), which referred to the Göktürks. The earliest mention of Turk (𐱅𐰇𐰺𐰜, türü̲k̲; or 𐱅𐰇𐰼𐰚, türk/tẄrk) in Turkic languages comes from the Second Turkic Khaganate. In Orkhon inscriptions, kök türü̲k̲ (𐰚𐰇𐰚 𐱅𐰇𐰼𐰜) is also mentioned, potentially referring to "Ashina-led Turks" or "Ashinas and Turks".

There are several theories regarding the origin of the ethnonym Turk. There is a claim that it may be connected to Herodotus's (c. 484 – c. 425 BC) reference to Targitaos, (Ταργιτάος), a king of the Scythians; however, Manfred Mayrhofer (apud Lincoln) assigned Iranian etymology for Targitaos: from Old Iranian *darga-tavah, meaning "he whose strength is long-lasting". During the first century AD, Pomponius Mela refers to the Turcae in the forests north of the Sea of Azov, and Pliny the Elder lists the Tyrcae among the people of the same area; yet English archaeologist Ellis Minns contended that Tyrcae is "a false correction" for Iurcae/Iurkai (Ἱύρκαι), a people who dwelt beyond the Thyssagetae, according to Herodotus (Histories, IV. 22) There are references to certain groups in antiquity whose names might have been foreign transcriptions of Tür(ü)k such as Togarmah, Turukha/Turuška, Turukku and so on; but according to American historian Peter B. Golden, while any connection of some of these ancient peoples to Turks is possible, it is rather unlikely.

As a word in Turkic languages, Türk may mean 'strong, strength, ripe' or 'flourishing, in full strength'. It may also mean ripe as for a fruit or "in the prime of life, young, and vigorous" for a person. Róna-Tas (1991) pointed to a Khotanese-Saka word, tturakä 'lid', semantically stretchable to 'helmet', as a possible source for this folk etymology, yet Golden thinks this connection requires more data.

=== Definition ===
In the 19th century Ottoman Empire, the word Türk referred to Anatolian peasants. The Ottoman ruling class identified themselves as Ottomans, not as Turks. However, they still claimed to be members of Kayi tribe of Oghuz Turks and direct descendants of Oghuz Khan. In the late 19th century, as the Ottoman upper classes adopted European ideas of nationalism, the term Türk took on a more positive connotation.

During Ottoman times, the millet system defined communities on a religious basis. In the early 20th century, the Young Turks abandoned Ottoman nationalism in favor of Turkish nationalism, while adopting the name Turks, which was finally used in the name of the new Turkish Republic.

Mustafa Kemal Atatürk defined the Turkish nation as the "people (halk) who established the Turkish republic". Further, "the natural and historical facts which effected the establishment (teessüs) of the Turkish nation" were "(a) unity in political existence, (b) unity in language, (c) unity in homeland, (d) unity in race and origin (menşe), (e) to be historically related and (f) to be morally related".

Article 66 of the Turkish Constitution defines a Turk as anyone who is "bound to the Turkish state through the bond of citizenship."

== History ==
=== Prehistory, Ancient era, and Early Middle Ages ===
First inhabited by modern humans during the Late Paleolithic, present-day Turkey was home to various ancient peoples. The Hattians were assimilated by the Hittites and other Anatolian peoples. Classical Anatolia transitioned into cultural Hellenization after Alexander the Great's conquests, and later Romanization during the Roman and Byzantine eras.

According to historians and linguists, the Proto-Turkic language originated in Central-East Asia, potentially in Altai-Sayan region, Mongolia or Tuva. Initially, Proto-Turkic speakers were potentially both hunter-gatherers and farmers; they later became nomadic pastoralists. Early and medieval Turkic groups exhibited a wide range of both East Asian and West-Eurasian physical appearances and genetic origins, in part through long-term contact with neighboring peoples such as Iranic, Mongolic, Tocharian, Uralic and Yeniseian peoples. In Central Asia, the earliest surviving Turkic language texts, found on the eighth-century Orkhon inscription monuments, were erected by the Göktürks in the sixth century CE, and include words not common to Turkic but found in unrelated Inner Asian languages. Although the ancient Turks were nomadic, they traded wool, leather, carpets, and horses for grain, silk, wood, and vegetables, and also had large ironworking stations in the south of the Altai Mountains during the 600s CE. Most of the Turkic peoples were followers of Tengrism, sharing the cult of the sky god Tengri, although there were also adherents of Manichaeism, Nestorian Christianity, and Buddhism. Byzantine era Anatolia served as a center of Christianity, with the Eastern Orthodox Church being based in Constantinople. However, during the Muslim conquests, the Turks entered the Muslim world proper as slaves, the booty of Arab raids and conquests. The Turks began converting to Islam after the Muslim conquest of Transoxiana through the efforts of missionaries, Sufis, and merchants. Although initiated by the Arabs, the conversion of the Turks to Islam was filtered through Persian and Central Asian culture. Under the Umayyads, most were domestic servants, whilst under the Abbasid Caliphate, increasing numbers were trained as soldiers. By the ninth century, Turkic commanders were leading the caliphs' Turkic troops into battle. As the Abbasid Caliphate declined, Turkic officers assumed more military and political power by taking over or establishing provincial dynasties with their own corps of Turkic troops.

=== Seljuk era ===
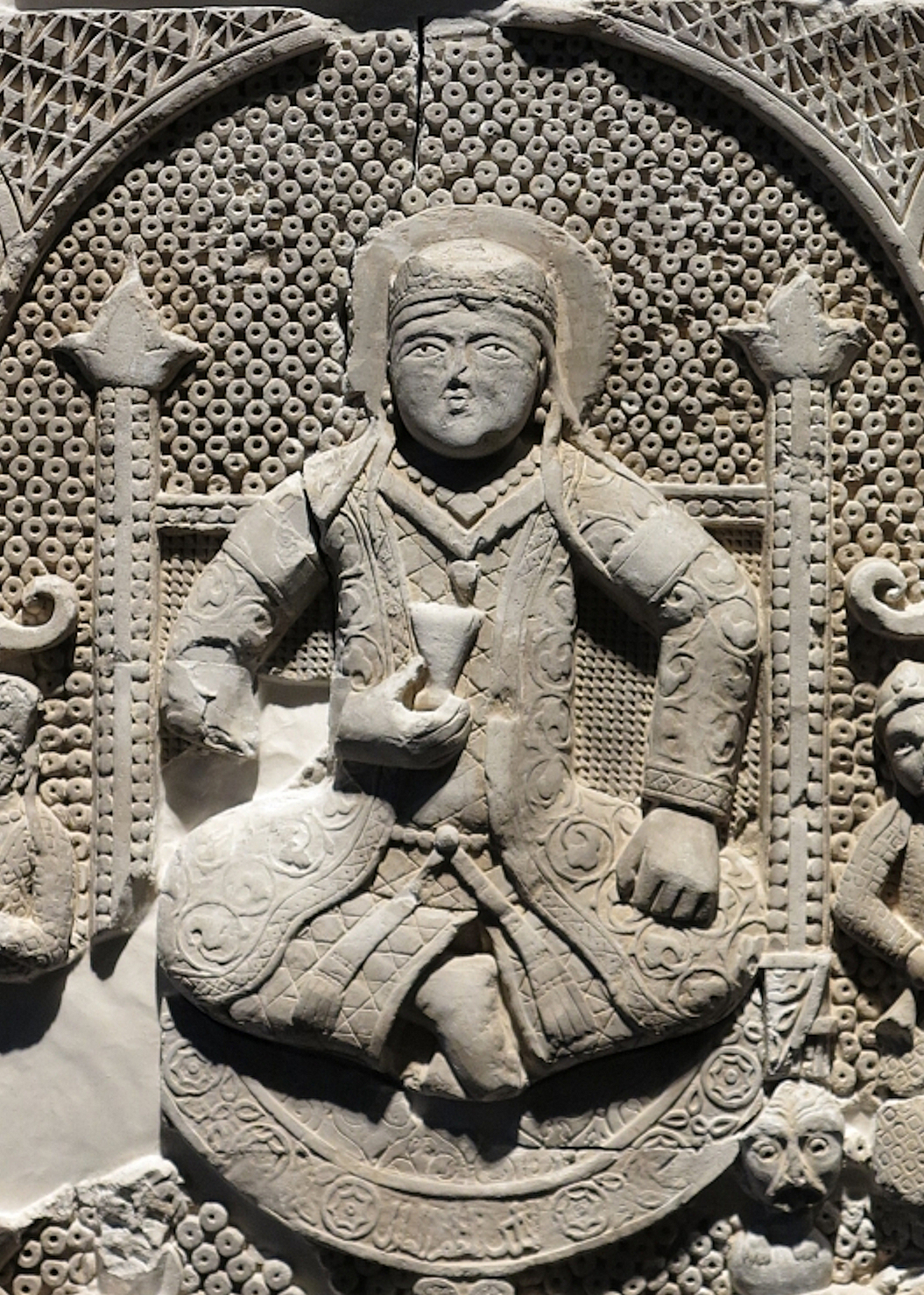
Enthroned figure usually identified as the last Seljuk ruler Tughril III (1176–1194), from Rayy, Iran. Philadelphia Museum of Art.

During the 11th century, the Seljuk Turks, who were influenced by Persian civilization in many ways, grew in strength and succeeded in taking the eastern province of the Abbasid Empire. By 1055, the Seljuks captured Baghdad and began to make their first incursions into Anatolia. When they won the Battle of Manzikert against the Byzantine Empire in 1071, it opened the gates of Anatolia to them. Although ethnically Turkish, the Seljuk Turks brought Turco-Persian culture to Anatolia rather than just a purely Turkish one. Nonetheless, the Turkish language and Islam were introduced and gradually spread over the region and the slow transition from a predominantly Christian and Greek-speaking Anatolia to a predominantly Muslim and Turkish-speaking one was underway.

In dire straits, the Byzantine Empire turned to the West for help, setting in motion the pleas that led to the First Crusade. The Seljuk Turks had established the Sultanate of Rum in 1077, and once the Crusaders took Iznik they ruled from their new capital, Konya, from 1097. By the 12th century, Europeans had begun to call the Anatolian region Turchia or Turkey, the land of the Turks. The Turkish society in Anatolia was divided into urban, rural and nomadic populations; other Turkoman (Turkmen) tribes who had arrived into Anatolia at the same time as the Seljuks kept their nomadic ways. These tribes were more numerous than the Seljuks, and rejecting the sedentary lifestyle, adhered to an Islam impregnated with animism and shamanism from their Central Asian steppeland origins, which then mixed with new Christian influences. From this popular and syncretist Islam, with its mystical and revolutionary aspects, sects such as the Alevis and Bektashis emerged. Furthermore, intermarriage between the Turks and local inhabitants, as well as the conversion of many to Islam, also increased the Turkish-speaking Muslim population in Anatolia.

By 1243, at the Battle of Köse Dağ, the Mongols defeated the Seljuk Turks and became the new rulers of Anatolia, and in 1256, the second Mongol invasion of Anatolia caused widespread destruction. Particularly after 1277, political stability within the Seljuk territories rapidly disintegrated, leading to the strengthening of Turkoman principalities in the western and southern parts of Anatolia called the "beyliks".

=== Beyliks era ===
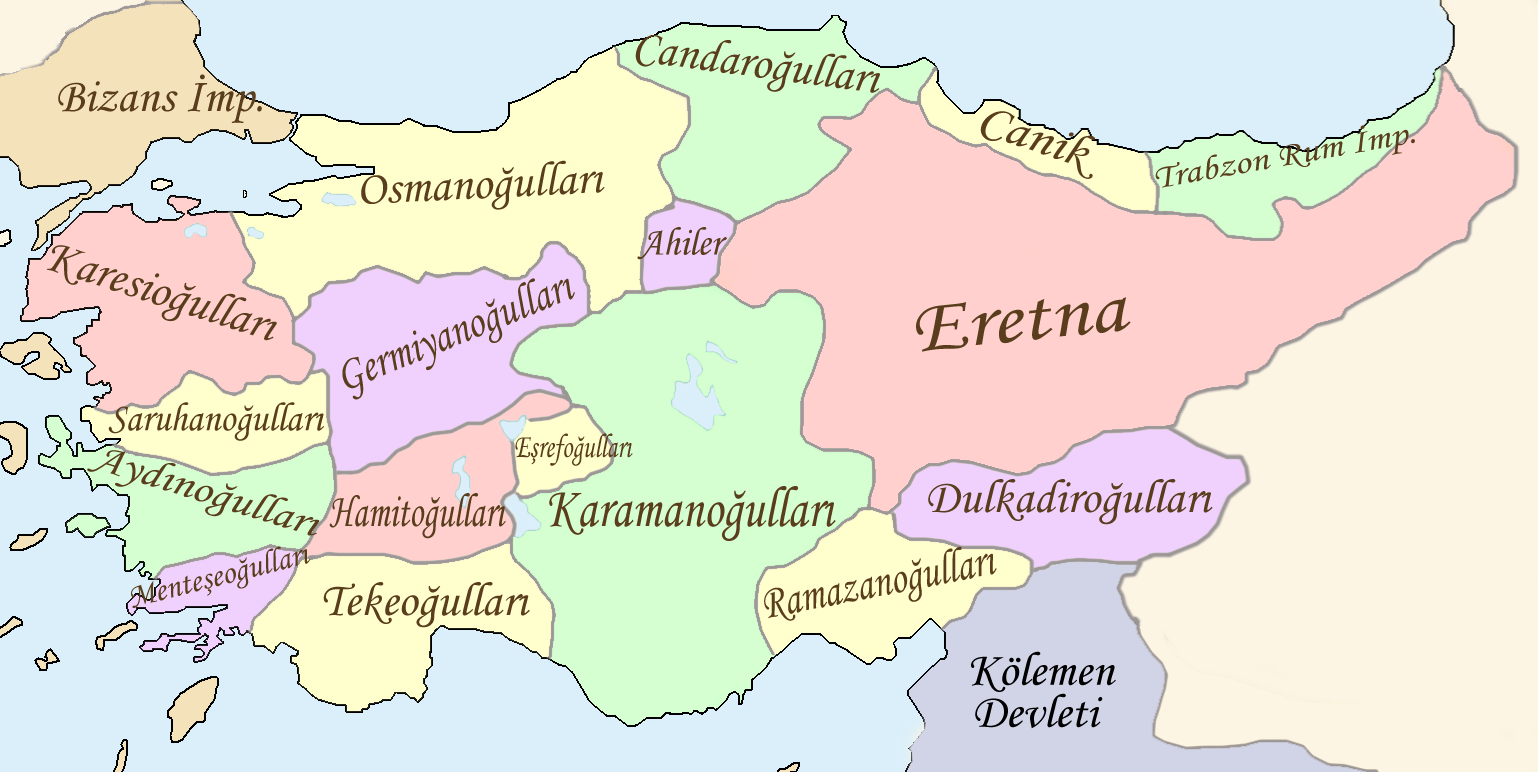
A map of the independent beyliks in Anatolia during the early 1300s.

When the Mongols defeated the Seljuk Turks and conquered Anatolia, the Turks became the vassals of the Ilkhans who established their own empire in the vast area which stretched from present-day Afghanistan to present-day Turkey. As the Mongols occupied more lands in Asia Minor, the Turks moved further into western Anatolia and settled in the Seljuk-Byzantine frontier. By the last decades of the 13th century, the Ilkhans and their Seljuk vassals lost control over much of Anatolia to these Turkoman peoples. A number of Turkish lords managed to establish themselves as rulers of various principalities, known as "Beyliks" or emirates. Amongst these beyliks, along the Aegean coast, from north to south, stretched the beyliks of Karasi, Saruhan, Aydin, Menteşe, and Teke. Inland from Teke was Hamid and east of Karasi was the beylik of Germiyan.

To the northwest of Anatolia, around Söğüt, was the small and, at this stage, insignificant, Ottoman beylik. It was hemmed into the east by other more substantial powers like Karaman on Iconium, which ruled from the Kızılırmak River to the Mediterranean. Although the Ottomans was only a small principality among the numerous Turkish beyliks, and thus posed the smallest threat to the Byzantine authority, their location in north-western Anatolia, in the former Byzantine province of Bithynia, became a fortunate position for their future conquests. The Latins, who had conquered the city of Constantinople in 1204 during the Fourth Crusade, established a Latin Empire (1204–1261), divided the former Byzantine territories in the Balkans and the Aegean among themselves, and forced the Byzantine Emperors into exile at Nicaea (present-day Iznik). From 1261 onwards, the Byzantines were largely preoccupied with regaining their control in the Balkans. Toward the end of the 13th century, as Mongol power began to decline, the Turkoman chiefs assumed greater independence.

=== Ottoman Empire ===
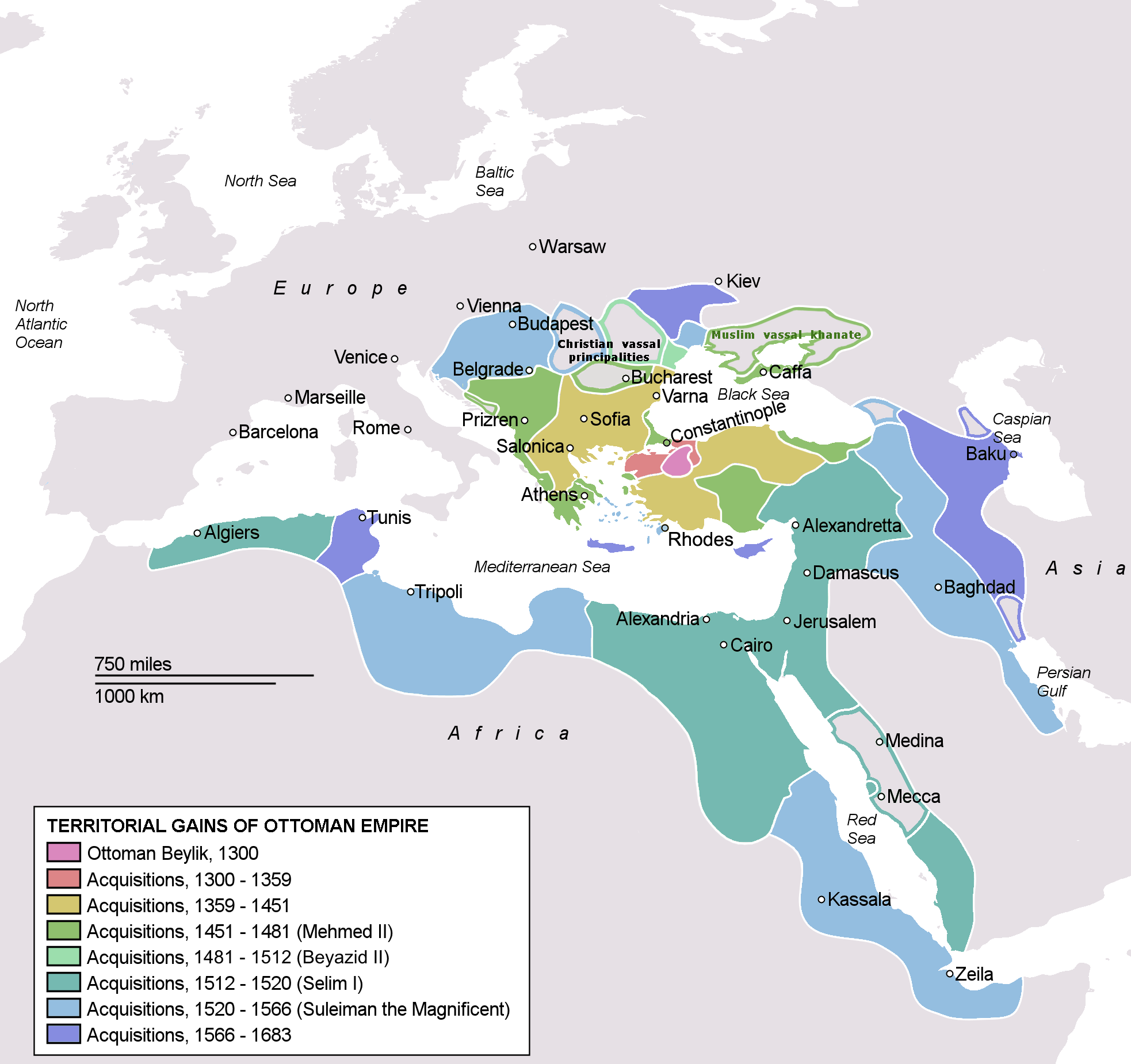
The Ottoman Empire was a Turkish empire that lasted from 1299 to 1922.

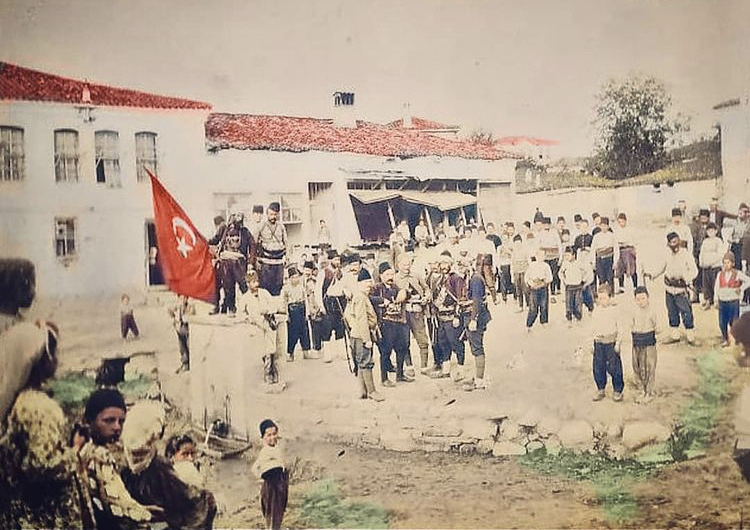
West Thrace Republic, Turks in Kardzali

Under its founder, Osman I, the nomadic Ottoman beylik expanded along the Sakarya River and westward towards the Sea of Marmara. Thus, the population of western Asia Minor had largely become Turkish-speaking and Muslim in religion. It was under his son, Orhan I, who had attacked and conquered the important urban center of Bursa in 1326, proclaiming it as the Ottoman capital, that the Ottoman Empire developed considerably. In 1354, the Ottomans crossed into Europe and established a foothold on the Gallipoli Peninsula while at the same time pushing east and taking Ankara. Many Turks from Anatolia began to settle in the region which had been abandoned by the inhabitants who had fled Thrace before the Ottoman invasion. However, the Byzantines were not the only ones to suffer from the Ottoman advance for, in the mid-1330s, Orhan annexed the Turkish beylik of Karasi. This advancement was maintained by Murad I who more than tripled the territories under his direct rule, reaching some 100,000 square miles (260,000 km^{2}), evenly distributed in Europe and Asia Minor. Gains in Anatolia were matched by those in Europe; once the Ottoman forces took Edirne (Adrianople), which became the capital of the Ottoman Empire in 1365, they opened their way into Bulgaria and Macedonia in 1371 at the Battle of Maritsa. With the conquests of Thrace, Macedonia, and Bulgaria, significant numbers of Turkish emigrants settled in these regions. This form of Ottoman-Turkish colonization became a very effective method to consolidate their position and power in the Balkans. The settlers consisted of soldiers, nomads, farmers, artisans and merchants, dervishes, preachers and other religious functionaries, and administrative personnel.

In 1453, Ottoman armies, under Sultan Mehmed II, conquered Constantinople. Mehmed reconstructed and repopulated the city, and made it the new Ottoman capital. After the Fall of Constantinople, the Ottoman Empire entered a long period of conquest and expansion with its borders eventually going deep into Europe, the Middle East, and North Africa. Selim I dramatically expanded the empire's eastern and southern frontiers in the Battle of Chaldiran and gained recognition as the guardian of the holy cities of Mecca and Medina. His successor, Suleiman the Magnificent, further expanded the conquests after capturing Belgrade in 1521 and using its territorial base to conquer Hungary, and other Central European territories, after his victory in the Battle of Mohács as well as also pushing the frontiers of the empire to the east. Following Suleiman's death, Ottoman victories continued, albeit less frequently than before. The island of Cyprus was conquered, in 1571, bolstering Ottoman dominance over the sea routes of the eastern Mediterranean. However, after its defeat at the Battle of Vienna, in 1683, the Ottoman army was met by ambushes and further defeats; the 1699 Treaty of Karlowitz, which granted Austria the provinces of Hungary and Transylvania, marked the first time in history that the Ottoman Empire actually relinquished territory.

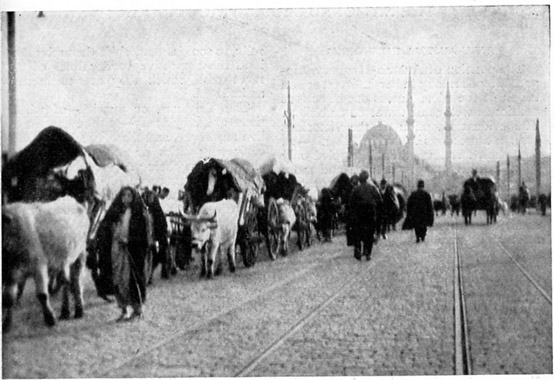
The loss of almost all Ottoman territories during the late 19th and early 20th centuries, and the establishment of the Republic of Turkey, in 1923, produced waves of Turkish refugees, who were known as "Muhacirs", who fled from hostile regions of the Balkans, the Black Sea, the Aegean islands, the island of Cyprus, the Sanjak of Alexandretta, the Middle East, and the Soviet Union to migrate to Anatolia and Eastern Thrace.

By the 19th century, the empire began to decline when ethno-nationalist uprisings occurred across the empire. In the 19th and early 20th centuries, persecution of Muslims during the Ottoman contraction and in the Russian Empire resulted in estimated 5 million deaths, with the casualties including Turks. Five to seven or seven to nine million refugees migrated into modern-day Turkey from the Balkans, Caucasus, Crimea, and Mediterranean islands, shifting the center of the Ottoman Empire to Anatolia. In addition to a small number of Jews, the refugees were overwhelmingly Muslim; they were both Turkish and non-Turkish people, such as Circassians and Crimean Tatars. Paul Mojzes has called the Balkan Wars an "unrecognized genocide", where multiple sides were both victims and perpetrators.

By 1913, the government of the Committee of Union and Progress started a program of forcible Turkification of non-Turkish minorities. By 1914, the World War I broke out, and the Turks scored some success in Gallipoli during the Battle of the Dardanelles in 1915. During World War I, the government of the Committee of Union and Progress continued to implement its Turkification policies, which affected non-Turkish minorities, such as the Armenians during the Armenian genocide and the Greeks during various campaigns of ethnic cleansing and expulsion. In 1918, the Ottoman Government agreed to the Mudros Armistice with the Allies.

The Treaty of Sèvres —signed in 1920 by the government of Mehmed VI— dismantled the Ottoman Empire. The Turks, under Mustafa Kemal Pasha (Atatürk), rejected the treaty and fought the Turkish War of Independence, resulting in the abortion of that text, never ratified, and the abolition of the Sultanate. Thus, the 623-year-old Ottoman Empire ended.

=== Modern era ===
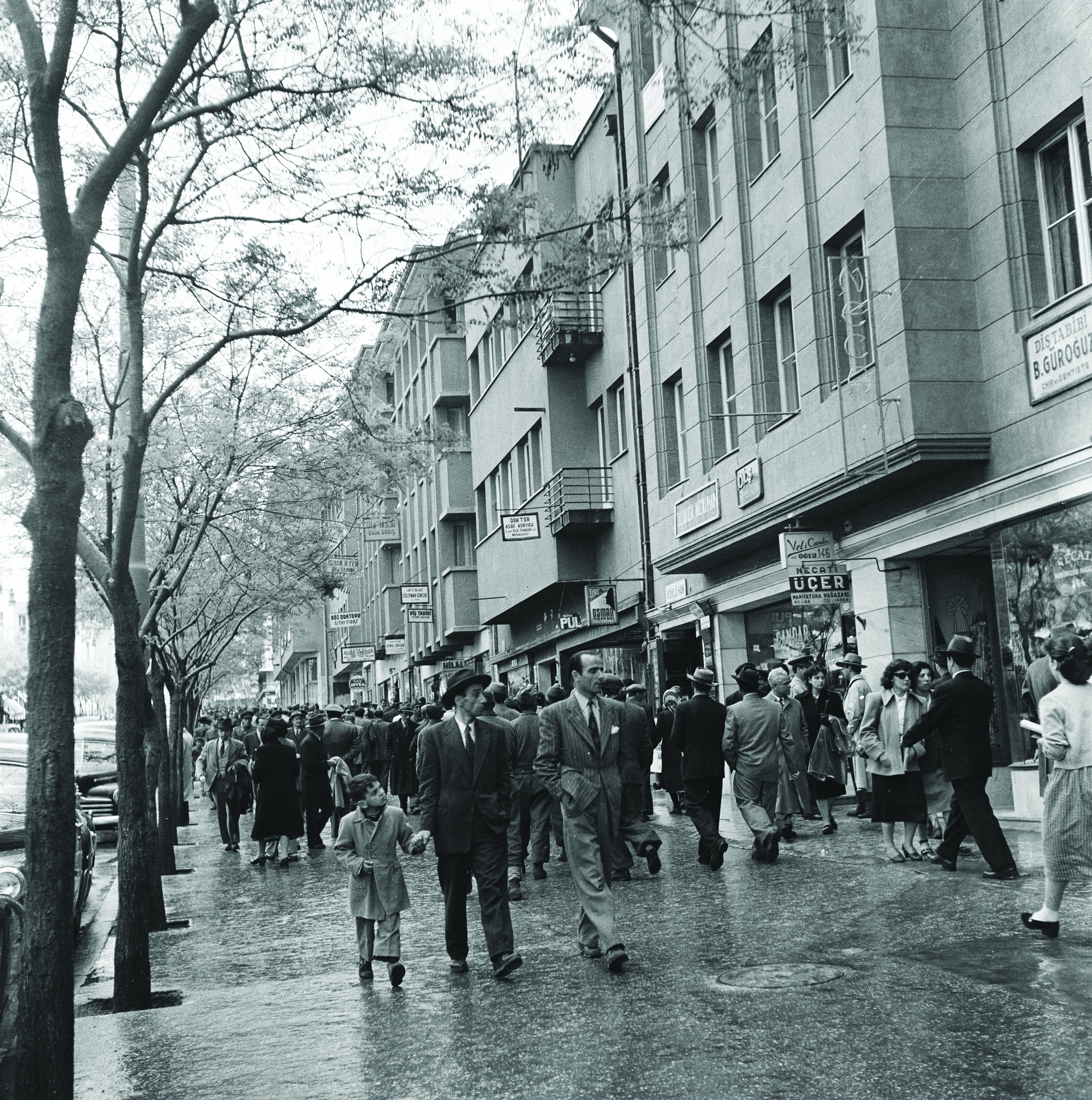
People on the Anafartalar Boulevard, Ankara in the 1950s

Once Kemal Atatürk led the Turkish War of Independence against the Allied forces that occupied the former Ottoman Empire, he united the Turkish Muslim majority and successfully led them from 1919 to 1922 in overthrowing the occupying forces out of what the Turkish National Movement considered the Turkish homeland. The Turkish identity became the unifying force when, in 1923, the Treaty of Lausanne was signed and the newly founded Republic of Turkey was formally established. Atatürk's presidency was marked by a series of radical political and social reforms that transformed Turkey into a secular, modern republic with civil and political equality for sectarian minorities and women.

Throughout the 1920s and the 1930s, Turks, as well as other Muslims, from the Balkans, the Black Sea, the Aegean islands, the island of Cyprus, the Sanjak of Alexandretta (Hatay), the Middle East, and the Soviet Union continued to arrive in Turkey, most of whom settled in urban north-western Anatolia. The bulk of these immigrants, known as "Muhacirs", were the Balkan Turks who faced harassment and discrimination in their homelands. However, there were still remnants of a Turkish population in many of these countries because the Turkish government wanted to preserve these communities so that the Turkish character of these neighbouring territories could be maintained. One of the last stages of ethnic Turks immigrating to Turkey was between 1940 and 1990 when about 700,000 Turks arrived from Bulgaria. Today, between a third and a quarter of Turkey's population are the descendants of these immigrants.

== Geographic distribution ==
=== Traditional areas of Turkish settlement ===
==== Turkey ====
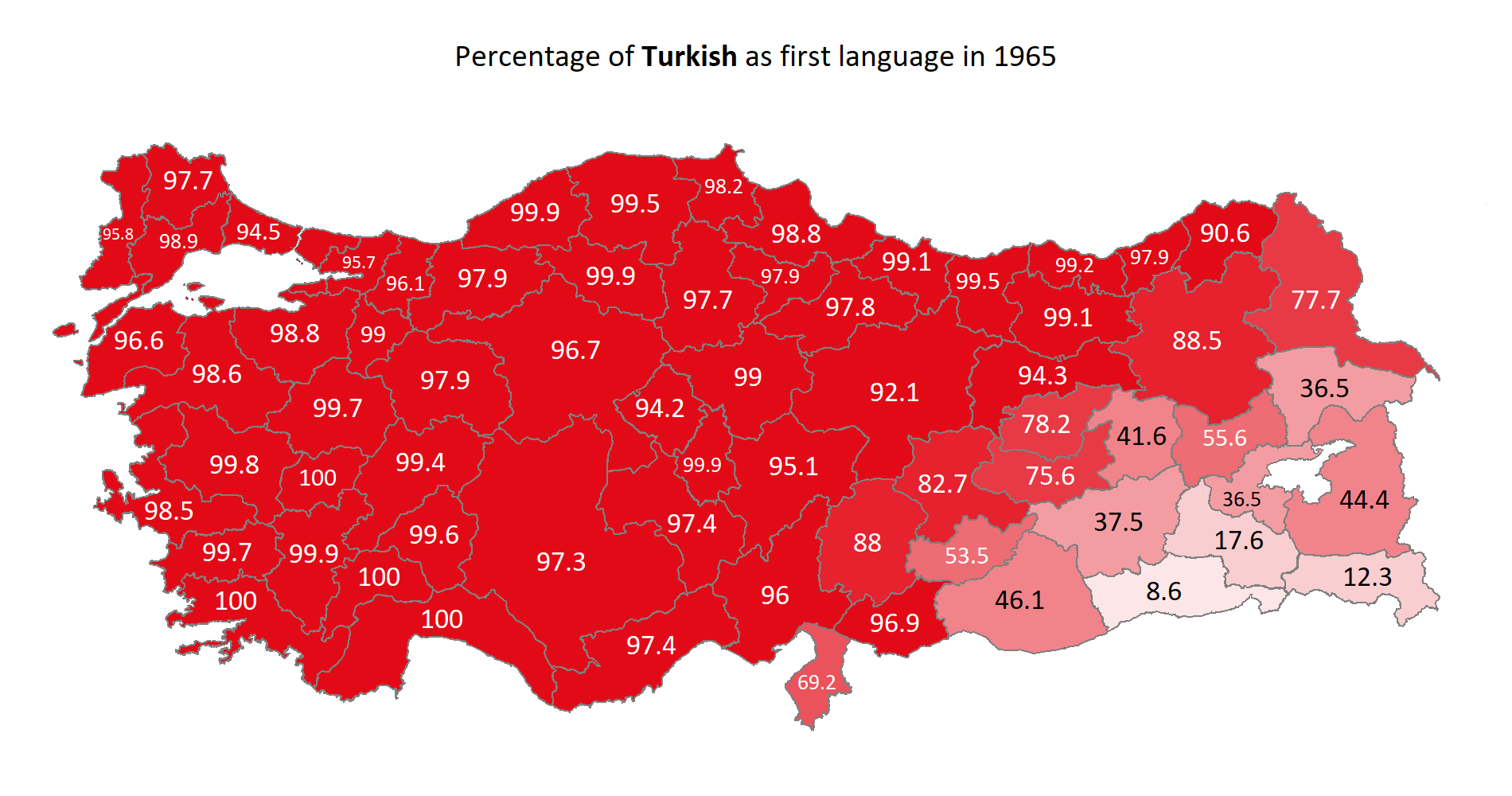
Percentage of people who speak Turkish as their first language by city, according to 1965 Turkish census

The ethnic Turks are the largest ethnic group in Turkey and number approximately 60 million to 65 million. Due to differing historical Turkish migrations to the region, dating from the Seljuk conquests in the 11th century to the continuous Turkish migrations which have persisted to the present day (especially Turkish refugees from neighboring countries), there are various accents and customs which can distinguish the ethnic Turks by geographic sub-groups. For example, the most significant are the Anatolian Turks in the central core of Asiatic Turkey whose culture was influential in underlining the roots of the Turkish nationalist ideology. There are also nomadic Turkic tribes who descend directly from Central Asia, such as the Yörüks; the Black Sea Turks in the north whose "speech largely lacks the vowel harmony valued elsewhere"; the descendants of muhacirs (Turkish refugees) who fled persecution from former Ottoman territories in the nineteenth and early twentieth centuries; and more recent refugees who have continued to flee discrimination and persecution since the mid-1900s.

Initially, muhacirs who arrived in Eastern Thrace and Anatolia came fleeing from former Ottoman territories which had been annexed by European colonial powers (such as France in Algeria or Russia in Crimea); however, the largest waves of ethnic Turkish migration came from the Balkans during the late 19th and early 20th centuries, when the Balkan Wars led to most of the region becoming independent from Ottoman control. The largest waves of muhacirs came from the Balkans (especially Bulgaria, Greece, Romania and Yugoslavia); however, substantial numbers also came from Cyprus, the Sanjak of Alexandretta, the Middle East (including Trans-Jordan and Yemen) North African (such as Algeria and Libya) and the Soviet Union (especially from Meskheti).

The Turks who remained in the former Ottoman territories continued to face discrimination and persecution thereafter leading many to seek refuge in Turkey, especially Turkish Meskhetians deported by Joseph Stalin in 1944; Turkish minorities in Yugoslavia (i.e., Turkish Bosnians, Turkish Croatians, Turkish Kosovars, Turkish Macedonians, Turkish Montenegrins and Turkish Serbians) fleeing Josip Broz Tito's regime in the 1950s; Turkish Cypriots fleeing the Cypriot intercommunal violence of 1955–74; Turkish Iraqis fleeing discrimination during the rise of Arab nationalism in the 1950s and 1970s followed by the Iran–Iraq War of 1980–88; Turkish Bulgarians fleeing the Bulgarisation policies of the so-called "Revival Process" under the communist ruler Todor Zivkov in the 1980s; and Turkish Kosovars fleeing the Kosovo War of 1998–99.

Today, approximately 15–20 million Turks living in Turkey are the descendants of refugees from the Balkans; there are also 1.5 million descendants from Meskheti and over 600,000 descendants from Cyprus. The Republic of Turkey continues to be a land of migration for ethnic Turkish people fleeing persecution and wars. For example, there are approximately 1 million Syrian Turkmen living in Turkey due to the current Syrian civil war.

==== Cyprus ====
The Turkish Cypriots are the ethnic Turks whose Ottoman Turkish forebears colonized the island of Cyprus in 1571. About 30,000 Turkish soldiers were given land once they settled in Cyprus, which bequeathed a significant Turkish community. In 1960, a census by the new Republic's government revealed that the Turkish Cypriots formed 18.2% of the island's population. However, once inter-communal fighting and ethnic tensions between 1963 and 1974 occurred between the Turkish and Greek Cypriots, known as the "Cyprus conflict", the Greek Cypriot government conducted a census in 1973, albeit without the Turkish Cypriot populace. A year later, in 1974, the Cypriot government's Department of Statistics and Research estimated the Turkish Cypriot population was 118,000 (or 18.4%). A coup d'état in Cyprus on 15 July 1974 by Greeks and Greek Cypriots favoring union with Greece (also known as "Enosis") was followed by military intervention by Turkey whose troops established Turkish Cypriot control over the northern part of the island. Hence, census's conducted by the Republic of Cyprus have excluded the Turkish Cypriot population that had settled in the unrecognized Turkish Republic of Northern Cyprus. Between 1975 and 1981, Turkey encouraged its own citizens to settle in Northern Cyprus; a report by CIA suggests that 200,000 of the residents of Cyprus are Turkish.

==== Balkans ====
A Turkish Kosovar speaking standard Turkish

Ethnic Turks continue to inhabit certain regions of Greece, North Macedonia, Kosovo, Romania, and Bulgaria since they first settled there during the Ottoman period. As of 2019, the Turkish population in the Balkans is over 1 million. Majority of Balkan Turks were killed or deported in the Muslim Persecution during Ottoman Contraction and arrived to Turkey as Muhacirs.

The majority of the Rumelian/Balkan Turks are the descendants of Ottoman settlers. However, the first significant wave of Anatolian Turkish settlement to the Balkans dates back to the mass migration of sedentary and nomadic subjects of the Seljuk sultan Kaykaus II (b. 1237 – d. 1279/80) who had fled to the court of Michael VIII Palaiologos in 1262.

===== Albania =====
The Turkish Albanians are one of the smallest Turkish communities in the Balkans. Once Albania came under Ottoman rule, Turkish colonization was scarce there; however, some Anatolian Turkish settlers did arrive in 1415–30 and were given timar estates. According to the 2011 census, the Turkish language was the sixth most spoken language in the country (after Albanian, Greek, Macedonian, Romani, and Aromanian).

===== Bosnia and Herzegovina =====
The Turkish Bosnians have lived in the region since the Ottoman rule of Bosnia and Herzegovina. Thus, the Turks form the oldest ethnic minority in the country. The Turkish Bosnian community decreased dramatically due to mass emigration to Turkey when Bosnia and Herzegovina came under Austro-Hungarian rule.

In 2003 the Parliamentary Assembly of Bosnia and Herzegovina adopted the "Law on the Protection of Rights of Members of National Minorities" which officially protected the Turkish minority's cultural, religious, educational, social, economic, and political freedoms.

===== Bulgaria =====
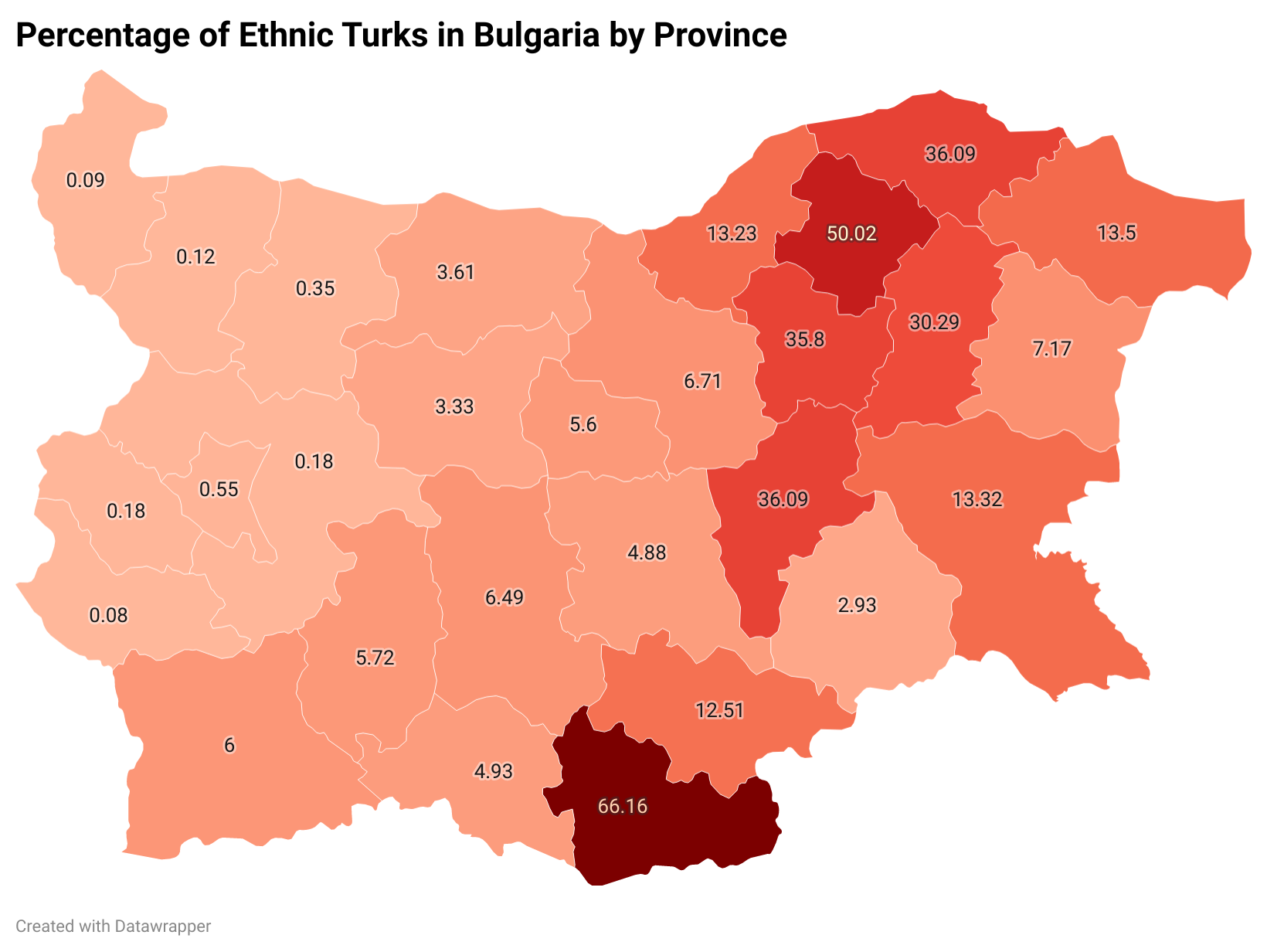
Percentage of ethnic Turks in Bulgaria by province (2011)

The Turks of Bulgaria form the largest Turkish community in the Balkans as well as the largest ethnic minority group in Bulgaria. According to the 2011 census, they form a majority in the Kardzhali Province (66.2%) and the Razgrad Province (50.02%), as well as substantial communities in the Silistra Province (36.09%), the Targovishte Province (35.80%), and the Shumen Province (30.29%). They were ethnically cleansed during the Muslim Persecution during Ottoman Contraction and subsequently targeted during the Revival Process that aimed to assimilate them into a Bulgarian identity.

===== Croatia =====
The Turkish Croatians began to settle in the region during the various Croatian–Ottoman wars. Despite being a small minority, the Turks are among the 22 officially recognized national minorities in Croatia.

===== Kosovo =====
The Turkish Kosovars are the third largest ethnic minority in Kosovo (after the Serbs and Bosniaks). They form a majority in the town and municipality of Mamuša.

===== Montenegro =====
The Turkish Montenegrins form the smallest Turkish minority group in the Balkans. They began to settle in the region following the Ottoman rule of Montenegro. A historical event took place in 1707 which involved the killing of the Turks in Montenegro as well as the murder of all Muslims. This early example of ethnic cleaning features in the epic poem The Mountain Wreath (1846). After the Ottoman withdrawal, the majority of the remaining Turks emigrated to Istanbul and İzmir. Today, the remaining Turkish Montenegrins predominantly live in the coastal town of Bar.

===== North Macedonia =====
The flag of the Centar Župa Municipality in North Macedonia is labelled with Macedonian and Turkish writing in its central banner

The Turkish Macedonians form the second largest Turkish community in the Balkans as well as the second largest minority ethnic group in North Macedonia. They form a majority in the Centar Župa Municipality and the Plasnica Municipality as well as substantial communities in the Mavrovo and Rostuša Municipality, the Studeničani Municipality, the Dolneni Municipality, the Karbinci Municipality, and the Vasilevo Municipality.

===== Romania =====
The Turkish Romanians are centered in the Northern Dobruja region. The only settlement which still has a Turkish majority population is in Dobromir located in the Constanța County. Historically, Turkish Romanians also formed a majority in other regions, such as the island of Ada Kaleh which was destroyed and flooded by the Romanian government for the construction of the Iron Gate I Hydroelectric Power Station.

===== Serbia =====
The Turkish Serbians have lived in Serbia since the Ottoman conquests in the region. They have traditionally lived in the urban areas of Serbia. In 1830, when the Principality of Serbia was granted autonomy, most Turks emigrated as "muhacirs" (refugees) to Ottoman Turkey, and by 1862 almost all of the remaining Turks left Central Serbia, including 3,000 from Belgrade. Today, the remaining community mostly live in Belgrade and Sandžak.

==== Caucasus ====
===== Azerbaijan =====
The Turkish Azerbaijanis began to settle in the region during the Ottoman rule, which lasted between 1578 and 1603. By 1615, the Safavid ruler, Shah Abbas I, solidified control of the region and then deported thousands of people from Azerbaijan. In 1998, there was still approximately 19,000 Turks living in Azerbaijan who descended from the original Ottoman settlers; they are distinguishable from the rest of Azeri society because they practice Sunni Islam (rather than the dominant Shia sect in the country).

Since the Second World War, the Turkish Azerbaijani community has increased significantly due to the mass wave of Turkish Meskhetian refugees who arrived during the Soviet rule.

===== Georgia =====
====== Abkhazia ======
The Turkish Abkhazians began to live in Abkhazia during the sixteenth century under Ottoman rule. Today, there are still Turks who continue to live in the region.

====== Meskheti ======
Prior to the Ottoman conquest of Meskheti in Georgia, hundreds of thousands of Turkic invaders had settled in the region from the thirteenth century. At this time, the main town, Akhaltsikhe, was mentioned in sources by the Turkish name "Ak-sika", or "White Fortress". Thus, this accounts for the present day Turkish designation of the region as "Ahıska". Local leaders were given the Turkish title "Atabek" from which came the fifteenth century name of one of the four kingdoms of what had been Georgia, Samtskhe-Saatabago, "the land of the Atabek called Samtskhe [Meskhetia]". In 1555 the Ottomans gained the western part of Meskheti after the Peace of Amasya treaty, whilst the Safavids took the eastern part. Then in 1578 the Ottomans attacked the Safavid controlled area which initiated the Ottoman–Safavid War (1578–1590). Meskheti was fully secured into the Ottoman Empire in 1639 after a treaty signed with Iran brought an end to Iranian attempts to take the region. With the arrival of more Turkish colonizers, the Turkish Meskhetian community increased significantly.

However, once the Ottomans lost control of the region in 1883, many Turkish Meskhetians migrated from Georgia to Turkey. Migrations to Turkey continued after the Russo-Turkish War (1877–1878) followed by the Bolshevik Revolution (1917), and then after Georgia was incorporated into the Soviet Union. During this period, some members of the community also relocated to other Soviet borders, and those who remained in Georgia were targeted by the Sovietisation campaigns. Thereafter, during World War II, the Soviet administration initiated a mass deportation of the remaining 115,000 Turkish Meskhetians in 1944, forcing them to resettle in the Caucasus and the Central Asian Soviet republics.

Thus, today hundreds of thousands of Turkish Meskhetians are scattered throughout the Post Soviet states (especially in Kazakhstan, Azerbaijan, Russia, Kyrgyzstan, Uzbekistan and Ukraine). Moreover, many have settled in Turkey and the United States. Attempts to repatriate them back to Georgia saw Georgian authorities receive applications covering 9,350 individuals within the two-year application period (up until 1 January 2010).

==== Levant and the Middle East ====
===== Iraq =====
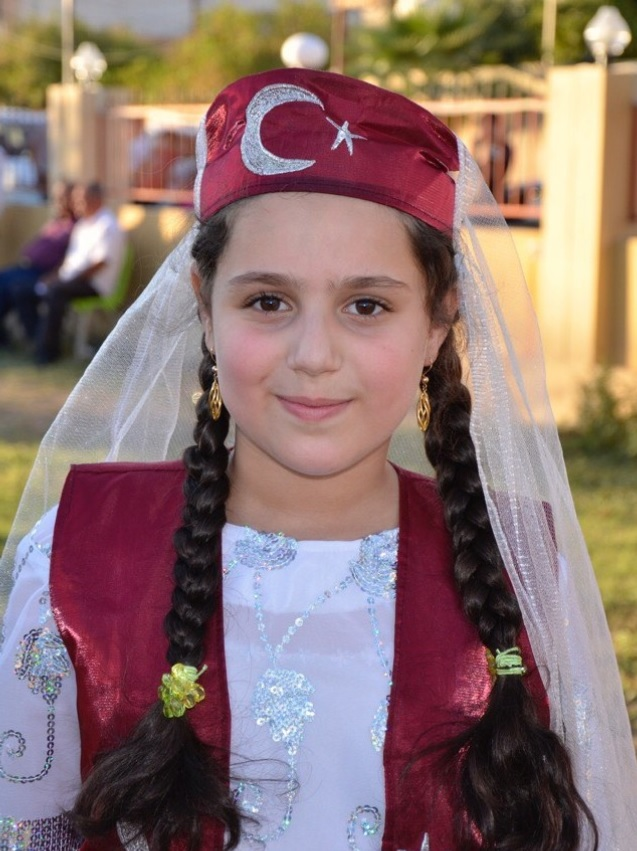
An Iraqi Turkmen girl in traditional Turkish costume.

Commonly referred to as the Iraqi Turkmens, the Turks are the second largest ethnic minority group in Iraq (i.e. after the Kurds). The majority are the descendants of Ottoman settlers (e.g. soldiers, traders and civil servants) who were brought into Iraq from Anatolia. Today, most Iraqi Turkmen live in a region they refer to as "Turkmeneli" which stretches from the northwest to the east at the middle of Iraq with Kirkuk placed as their cultural capital.

Historically, Turkic migrations to Iraq date back to the 7th century when Turks were recruited in the Umayyad armies of Ubayd-Allah ibn Ziyad followed by thousands more Turkmen warriors arriving under the Abbasid rule. However, most of these Turks became assimilated into the local Arab population. The next large scale migration occurred under the Great Seljuq Empire after Sultan Tuğrul Bey's invasion in 1055. For the next 150 years, the Seljuk Turks placed large Turkmen communities along the most valuable routes of northern Iraq. Yet, the largest wave of Turkish migrations occurred under the four centuries of Ottoman rule (1535–1919). In 1534, Suleiman the Magnificent secured Mosul within the Ottoman Empire and it became the chief province (eyalet) responsible for administrative districts in the region. The Ottomans encouraged migration from Anatolia and the settlement of Turks along northern Iraq. After 89 years of peace, the Ottoman–Safavid War (1623–1639) saw Murad IV recapturing Baghdad and taking permanent control over Iraq which resulted in the influx of continuous Turkish settlers until Ottoman rule came to an end in 1919.

After the establishment of the Republic of Turkey in 1923, the Iraqi Turkmens initially sought for Turkey to annex the Mosul Vilayet. However, they participated in elections for the Constituent Assembly with the condition of preserving the Turkish character in Kirkuk's administration and the recognition of Turkish as the liwa's official language. Although they were recognized as a constitutive entity of Iraq, alongside the Arabs and Kurds, in the constitution of 1925, the Iraqi Turkmen were later denied this status. Thereafter, the Iraqi Turkmen found themselves increasingly discriminated against from the policies of successive regimes, such as the Kirkuk Massacre of 1923, 1947, 1959 and in 1979 when the Ba'ath Party discriminated against the community.

Thus, the position of the Iraqi Turkmens has changed from historically being administrative and business classes of the Ottoman Empire to an increasingly discriminated minority. Arabization and Kurdification policies have seen Iraqi Turkmens pushed out of their homeland and thus various degrees of suppression and assimilation have ranged from political persecution and exile to terror and ethnic cleansing. Many Iraqi Turkmen have consequently sought refuge in Turkey whilst there has also been increasing migration to Western Europe (especially Denmark, Germany, the Netherlands, Sweden and the United Kingdom) as well as Canada, the United States, Australia and New Zealand.

===== Egypt =====
The Turkish Egyptians are mostly the descendants of Turkish settlers who arrived during the Ottoman rule of Egypt (1517–1867 and 1867–1914). During the Mamluk Sultanate, Classical Arabic sources show that the Bahri dynasty is referred to as the State of the Turks or The State of the Turkic , (Note: (Arabic: دولة الاتراك, Dawlat al-Atrāk; دولة الترك, Dawlat al-Turk) or the State of Turkey (الدولة التركية, al-Dawla al-Turkiyya)) referring to the Kipchaks Turkic from the Great steppe. Nonetheless, the Ottoman legacy has been the most significance in the preservation of the Turkish culture in Egypt which still remains visible today.

===== Lebanon =====
The Lebanese Turkmen are the ethnic Turks who constitute one of the ethnic groups in Lebanon. The historic rule of several Turkic dynasties in the region saw continuous Turkish migration waves to Lebanon during the Tulunid rule (868–905), Ikhshidid rule (935–969), Seljuk rule (1037–1194), Mamluk rule (1291–1515), and Ottoman rule (1516–1918). Today, most of the Turkish Lebanese community are the descendants of the Ottoman Turkish settlers to Lebanon from Anatolia. However, with the declining territories of the Ottoman Empire in the 19th century, ethnic Turkish minorities from other parts of the former Ottoman territories found refuge in Ottoman Lebanon, especially Algerian Turks after the French colonization of North Africa in 1830, and Cretan Turks in 1897 due to unrest in Greece.

===== Palestine =====
Palestine was under Ottoman rule for over four centuries, from 1517 until 1922. Consequently, many Palestinian families have Turkish origins. However, Turkish migration did not simply come to a halt after the Ottoman period. Rather, during the British rule of Cyprus (1878–1960), many Turkish Cypriot families struggling during the Great Depression and its aftermath were forced to marry off their daughters to Arabs in British Palestine with hopes that they would have a better life there. Thousands of Turkish Cypriot women and girls were thus sent to Palestine until the late 1950s.

Turkish family surnames in Palestine often end with the letter's "ji" (e.g., al-Batniji and al-Shorbaji) whilst other common names include al-Gharbawi, Tarzi, Turk, Birkdar, Jukmadar, Radwan, Jasir and al-Jamasi.

As of 2022, there are still thousands of Palestinian families in Gaza who are of Turkish origin.

===== Saudi Arabia =====
As of today, the total estimate of ethnic Turks in Saudi Arabia numbered up to 270,000-350,000. After waves of Ottoman Turkish migration to the Saudi states, the Turks have made themselves one of the largest ethnic minorities in the country.

===== Syria =====
The Turkish-speaking Syrian Turkmen form the second largest ethnic minority group in Syria (i.e., after the Kurds); however, some estimates indicated that if Arabized Turks who no longer speaking Turkish are taken into account then they collectively form the largest ethnic minority in the country. The majority of Syrian Turkmen are the descendants of Anatolian Turkish settlers who arrived in the region during the Ottoman rule (1516–1918). Today, they mostly live near the Syria–Turkey border, stretching from the northwestern governorates of Idlib and Aleppo to the Raqqa Governorate. Many also reside in the Turkmen Mountain near Latakia, the city of Homs and its vicinity until Hama, Damascus, and the southwestern governorates of Dera'a (bordering Jordan) and Quneitra (bordering Israel).

Turkic migrations to Syria began in the 11th century, especially after the Seljuk Turks opened the way for mass migration of Turkish nomads once they entered northern Syria in 1071 and after they took Damascus in 1078 and Aleppo in 1086. By the 12th century the Turkic Zengid dynasty continued to settle Turkmes in Aleppo to confront attacks from the Crusaders. Further migrations occurred once the Mamluks entered Syria in 1260. However, the largest Turkmen migrations occurred after the Ottoman sultan Selim I conquered Syria in 1516. Turkish migration from Anatolia to Ottoman Syria was continuous for almost 400 years, until Ottoman rule ended in 1918.

In 1921 the Treaty of Ankara established Alexandretta (present-day Hatay) under an autonomous regime under French Mandate of Syria. Article 7 declared that the Turkish language would be an officially recognized language. However, once France announced that it would grant full independence to Syria, Kemal Atatürk demanded that Alexandretta be given its independence. Consequently, the Hatay State was established in 1938 and then petitioned for Ankara to unify Hatay with the Republic of Turkey. France agreed to the Turkish annexation on 23 July 1939.

Thereafter, Arabization policies saw the names of Turkish villages in Syria renamed with Arabic names and some Turkmen lands were nationalized and resettled with Arabs near the Turkish border. A mass exodus of Syrian Turkmen took place between 1945 and 1953, many of which settled in southern Turkey. Since the Syrian Civil War (2011–present), many Syrian Turkmen have been internally displaced and many have sought asylum in Turkey, Jordan, Lebanon and northern Iraq, as well as several Western European countries and Australia.

==== Maghreb ====
The Ottomans took control of Algeria in 1515 and Tunisia in 1534 (but took full control of the latter in 1574) which lead to the settlement of Turks in the region, particularly around the coastal towns. Once these regions came under French colonialism, the French classified the populations under their rule as either "Arab" or "Berber", despite the fact that these countries had diverse populations, which were also composed of ethnic Turks and Kouloughlis (i.e., people of partial Turkish origin). Jane E Goodman has said that:

From early on, the French viewed North Africa through a Manichean lens. Arab and Berber became the primary ethnic categories through which the French classified the population (Lorcin 1995: 2). This occurred despite the fact that a diverse and fragmented populace comprised not only various Arab and Berber tribal groups but also Turks, Andalusians (descended from Moors exiled from Spain during the Crusades), Kouloughlis (offspring of Turkish men and North African women), blacks (mostly slaves or former slaves), and Jews.

===== Algeria =====
According to the U.S. Department of State "Algeria's population, [is] a mixture of Arab, Berber, and Turkish in origin"; meanwhile, Australia's Department of Foreign Affairs has reported that the demographics of Algeria (as well as that of Tunisia) includes a "strong Turkish admixture".

Today, Turkish descended families in Algeria continue to practice the Hanafi school of Islam (in contrast to the ethnic Arabs and Berbers who practice the Maliki school); moreover, many retain their Turkish-origin surnames — which mostly expresses a provenance or ethnic Turkish origin from Anatolia.

===== Libya =====
The Turkish Libyans form the second largest ethnic minority group in Libya (i.e. after the Berbers) and mostly live in Misrata, Tripoli, Zawiya, Benghazi and Derna. Some Turkish Libyans also live in more remote areas of the country, such as the Turkish neighborhood of Hay al-Atrak in the town of Awbari. They are the descendants of Turkish settlers who were encouraged to migrate from Anatolia to Libya during the Ottoman rule which lasted between 1555 and 1911.

Today, the city of Misrata is considered to be the "main center of the Turkish-origin community in Libya"; in total, the Turks form approximately two-thirds (est. 270,000) of Misrata's 400,000 inhabitants. Consequently, since the Libyan Civil War erupted in 2011, Misrata became "the bastion of resistance" and Turkish Libyans figured prominently in the war. In 2014 a former Gaddafi officer reported to the New York Times that the civil war was now an "ethnic struggle" between Arab tribes (like the Zintanis) against those of Turkish ancestry (like the Misuratis), as well as against the Berbers and Circassians.

===== Tunisia =====
Tunisia's population is made up "mostly of people of Arab, Berber, and Turkish descent". The Turkish Tunisians began to settle in the region in 1534, with about 10,000 Turkish soldiers, when the Ottoman Empire answered the calls of Tunisia's inhabitants who sought the help of the Turks due to fears that the Spanish would invade the country. During the Ottoman rule, the Turkish community dominated the political life of the region for centuries; as a result, the ethnic mix of Tunisia changed considerably with the continuous migration of Turks from Anatolia, as well as other parts of the Ottoman territories, for over 300 years. In addition, some Turks intermarried with the local population and their male offspring were called "Kouloughlis".

=== Modern diaspora ===
==== Europe ====
Modern immigration of Turks to Western Europe began with Turkish Cypriots migrating to the United Kingdom in the early 1920s when the British Empire annexed Cyprus in 1914 and the residents of Cyprus became subjects of the Crown. However, Turkish Cypriot migration increased significantly in the 1940s and 1950s due to the Cyprus conflict. Conversely, in 1944, Turks who were forcefully deported from Meskheti in Georgia during the Second World War, known as the Meskhetian Turks, settled in Eastern Europe (especially in Russia and Ukraine). By the early 1960s, migration to Western and Northern Europe increased significantly from Turkey when Turkish "guest workers" arrived under a "Labour Export Agreement" with Germany in 1961, followed by a similar agreement with the Netherlands, Belgium and Austria in 1964; France in 1965; and Sweden in 1967. More recently, Bulgarian Turks, Romanian Turks, and Western Thrace Turks have also migrated to Western Europe.

In 1997 Professor Servet Bayram and Professor Barbara Seels said that there was 10 million Turks living in Western Europe and the Balkans (excluding Cyprus and Turkey). By 2010, Boris Kharkovsky from the Center for Ethnic and Political Science Studies said that there was up to 15 million Turks living in the European Union. According to Dr Araks Pashayan 10 million "Euro-Turks" alone were living in Germany, France, the Netherlands and Belgium in 2012. Yet, there are also significant Turkish communities living in Austria, the UK, Switzerland, Italy, Liechtenstein, the Scandinavian countries, and the Post-Soviet states.

==== North America ====
In the 2000 United States census 117,575 Americans voluntarily declared their ethnicity as Turkish. However, the actual number of Turkish Americans is considerably larger with most choosing not to declare their ethnicity. Thus, Turkish Americans have been considered to be a "hard to count" community. In 1996 Professor John J. Grabowski had estimated the number of Turks to be 500,000. By 2009, official institutions placed the number between 850,000 and 900,000; however, Turkish non-governmental organizations in the USA had claimed at least 3 million Turks in the USA. More recently, in 2012, the US Commerce Secretary, John Bryson, stated that the Turkish American community was over 1,000,000. Meanwhile, in 2021, Senator Brian Feldman said that there was "over 2 million Turkish Americans". The largest concentration of Turkish Americans are in New York City, and Rochester, New York; Washington, D.C.; and Detroit, Michigan. In addition, the Turks of South Carolina, are an Anglicized and isolated community identifying as Turkish in Sumter County, where they have lived for over 200 years.

Regarding the Turkish Canadian community, Statistics Canada reports that 63,955 Canadians in the 2016 census listed Turk as an ethnic origin, including those who listed more than one origin. However, the Canadian Ambassador to Turkey, Chris Cooter, said that there was over 100,000 Turkish Canadians in 2018. The majority live in Ontario, mostly in Toronto, and there is also a sizable Turkish community in Montreal, Quebec.

==== Oceania ====
A notable scale of Turkish migration to Australia began in the late 1940s when Turkish Cypriots began to leave the island of Cyprus for economic reasons, and then, during the Cyprus conflict, for political reasons, marking the beginning of a Turkish Cypriot immigration trend to Australia. The Turkish Cypriot community were the only Muslims acceptable under the White Australia Policy; many of these early immigrants found jobs working in factories, out in the fields, or building national infrastructure. In 1967, the governments of Australia and Turkey signed an agreement to allow Turkish citizens to immigrate to Australia. Prior to this recruitment agreement, there were fewer than 3,000 people of Turkish origin in Australia. According to the Australian Bureau of Statistics, nearly 19,000 Turkish immigrants arrived from 1968 to 1974. They came largely from rural areas of Turkey, approximately 30% were skilled and 70% were unskilled workers. However, this changed in the 1980s when the number of skilled Turks applying to enter Australia had increased considerably. Over the next 35 years the Turkish population rose to almost 100,000. More than half of the Turkish community settled in Victoria, mostly in the north-western suburbs of Melbourne. According to the 2006 Australian Census, 59,402 people claimed Turkish ancestry; however, this does not show a true reflection of the Turkish Australian community as it is estimated that between 40,000 and 120,000 Turkish Cypriots and 150,000 to 200,000 mainland Turks live in Australia. Furthermore, there has also been ethnic Turks who have migrated to Australia from Bulgaria, Greece, Iraq, and North Macedonia.

==== Post-Soviet states ====
Due to the ordered deportation of over 115,000 Meskhetian Turks from their homeland in 1944, during the Second World War, the majority were settled in the Post-Soviet states in the Caucasus and Central Asia. According to the 1989 Soviet Census, which was the last Soviet Census, 106,000 Meskhetian Turks lived in Uzbekistan, 50,000 in Kazakhstan, and 21,000 in Kyrgyzstan. However, in 1989, the Meshetian Turks who had settled in Uzbekistan became the target of a pogrom in the Fergana valley, which was the principal destination for Meskhetian Turkish deportees, after an uprising of nationalism by the Uzbeks. The riots had left hundreds of Turks dead or injured and nearly 1,000 properties were destroyed; thus, thousands of Meskhetian Turks were forced into renewed exile. Soviet authorities recorded many Meskhetian Turks as belonging to other nationalities such as "Azeri", "Kazakh", "Kyrgyz", and "Uzbek".

== Culture ==
=== Language ===
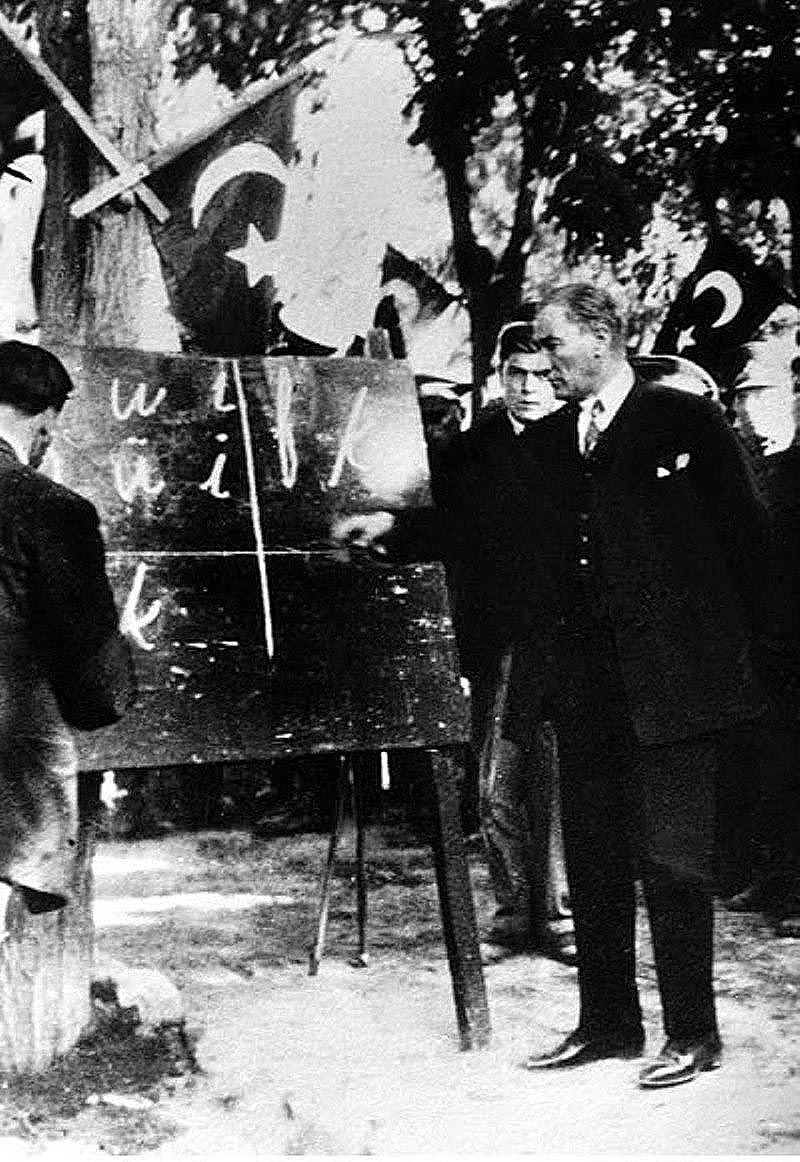
Kemal Atatürk introducing the modern Turkish alphabet to the people of Kayseri in 1928

Based on geographic variants, the ethnic Turks speak various dialects of the Turkish language. As of 2021, Turkish remains "the largest and most vigorous Turkic language, spoken by over 80 million people".

Historically, Ottoman Turkish was the official language and lingua franca throughout the Ottoman territories and the Ottoman Turkish alphabet used the Perso-Arabic script. However, Turkish intellectuals sought to simplify the written language during the rise of Turkish nationalism in the nineteenth century.

By the twentieth century, intensive language reforms were thoroughly practiced; most importantly, Kemal Atatürk changed the written script to a Latin-based modern Turkish alphabet in 1928. Since then, the regulatory body leading the reform activities has been the Turkish Language Association which was founded in 1932.

The modern standard Turkish is based on the dialect of Istanbul. However, dialectal variation persists, in spite of the levelling influence of the standard used in mass media and the Turkish education system since the 1930s. The terms ağız or şive often refer to the different types of Turkish dialects.

Countries where Turkish is an official language Countries where it is recognised as a minority language Countries where it is recognised as a minority language and co-official in at least one municipality

==== Official status ====
Today, the modern Turkish language is used as the official language of Turkey and Northern Cyprus. It is also an official language in the Republic of Cyprus (alongside Greek). In Kosovo, Turkish is recognized as an official language in the municipalities of Prizren, Mamusha, Gjilan, Mitrovica, Pristina, and Vushtrri, whilst elsewhere in the country it is recognized as a minority language. Similarly, in North Macedonia Turkish is an official language where they form at least 20% of the population (which includes the Plasnica Municipality, the Centar Župa Municipality, and the Mavrovo and Rostuša Municipality), whilst elsewhere in the country it remains a minority language only. Iraq recognizes Turkish as an official language in all regions where Turks constitute the majority of the population, and as a minority language elsewhere. In several countries, Turkish is officially recognized as a minority language only, including in Bosnia and Herzegovina, Croatia, and Romania. However, in Greece the right to use the Turkish language is only recognized in Western Thrace; the sizable and longstanding minorities elsewhere in the country (i.e. Rhodes and Kos) do not benefit from this same recognition.

There are also several post-Ottoman nations which do not officially recognize the Turkish language but give rights to Turkish minorities to study in their own language (alongside the compulsory study of the official language of the country); this is practiced in Bulgaria and Tunisia.

Various variants of Turkish are also used by millions of Turkish immigrants and their descendants in Western Europe, however, there is no official recognition in these countries.

==== Turkish dialects ====
Kıbrısım
An example of folk music in the Cypriot Turkish dialect.

There are three major Anatolian Turkish dialect groups spoken in Turkey: the West Anatolian dialect (roughly to the west of the Euphrates), the East Anatolian dialect (to the east of the Euphrates), and the North East Anatolian group, which comprises the dialects of the Eastern Black Sea coast, such as Trabzon, Rize, and the littoral districts of Artvin.

The Balkan Turkish dialects, also called the Rumelian Turkish dialects, are divided into two main groups: "Western Rumelian Turkish" and "Eastern Rumelian Turkish". The Western dialects are spoken in North Macedonia, Kosovo, western Bulgaria, northern Romania, Bosnia and Albania. The Eastern dialects are spoken in Greece, northeastern/southern Bulgaria and southeastern Romania. This division roughly follows through a borderline between west and east Bulgaria, which starts east of Lom and proceeds southwards to the east of Vratsa, Sofia and Samokov, and turns west reaching south of Kyustendil close to the borders with Serbia and North Macedonia. The eastern dialects lacks some of the phonetic peculiarities found in the western area; thus, its dialects are close to the central Anatolian dialects. The Turkish dialects spoken near the western Black Sea region (e.g., Ludogorie, Dobruja, and Bessarabia) show analogies with northeastern Anatolian Black Sea dialects.

The Cypriot Turkish dialect maintained features of the respective local varieties of the Ottoman settlers who mostly came from the Konya-Antalya-Adana region; furthermore, Cypriot Turkish was also influenced by Cypriot Greek. Today, the varieties spoken in Northern Cyprus are increasingly influenced by standard Turkish.The Cypriot Turkish dialect is being exposed to increasing standard Turkish through immigration from Turkey, new mass media, and new educational institutions.

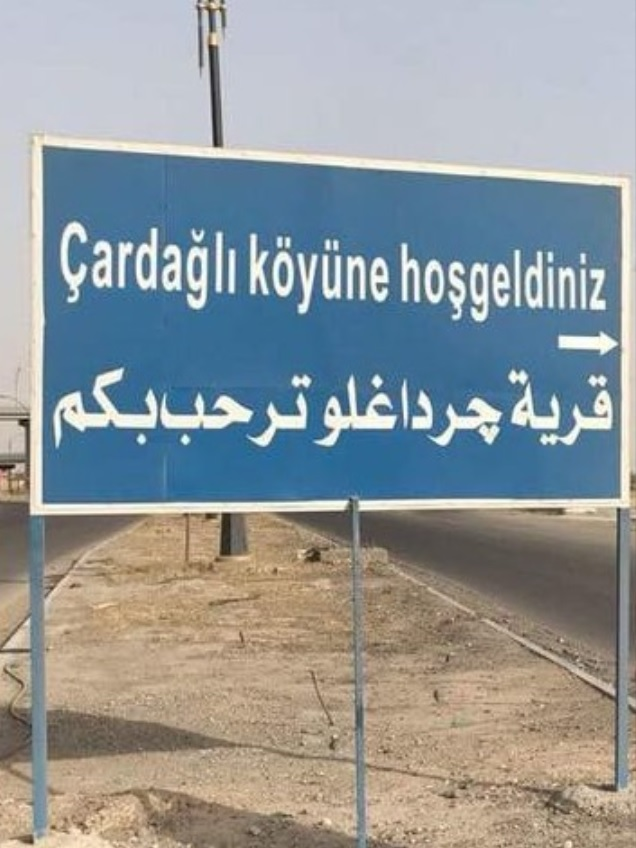
A bilingual road sign (Turkish and Arabic) in Iraq

The Iraqi Turkish dialects have similarities with certain Southeastern Anatolian dialects around the region of Urfa and Diyarbakır. Some linguists have described the Iraqi Turkish dialects as an "Anatolian" or an "Eastern Anatolian dialect". Historically, Iraqi Turkish was influenced by Ottoman Turkish and neighboring Azerbaijani Turkic. However, Istanbul Turkish is now a prestige language which exerts a profound influence on their dialects. The syntax in Iraqi Turkish therefore differs sharply from neighboring Irano-Turkic varieties, and shares characteristics which are similar to Turkish dialects in Turkey. Collectively, the Iraqi Turkish dialects also show similarities with Cypriot Turkish and Balkan Turkish regarding modality. The written language of the Iraqi Turkmen is based on Istanbul Turkish using the modern Turkish alphabet.

The Meskhetian Turkish dialect was originally spoken in Georgia until the Turkish Meskhetian community were forcefully deported and then dispersed throughout Turkey, Russia, Central Asia, Azerbaijan, Ukraine, and the United States. They speak an Eastern Anatolian dialect of Turkish, which hails from the regions of Kars, Ardahan, and Artvin. The Meskhetian Turkish dialect has also borrowed from other languages (including Azerbaijani, Georgian, Kazakh, Kyrgyz, Russian, and Uzbek), which the Meskhetian Turks have been in contact with during the Russian and Soviet rule.

The Syrian Turkish dialects are spoken throughout the country. In Aleppo, Tell Abyad, Raqqa and Bayırbucak they speak Southeastern Anatolian dialects (comparable to Kilis, Antep, Urfa, Hatay and Yayladağı). In Damascus they speak Turkish language with a Yörük dialect. Currently, Turkish is the third most widely used language in Syria (after Arabic and Kurdish).

=== Religion ===
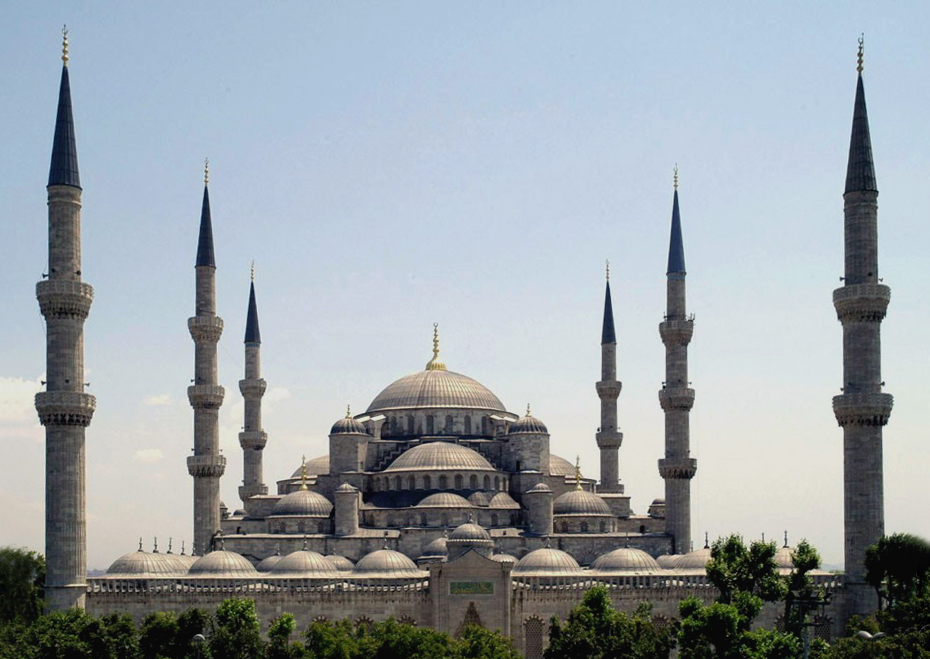
The Blue Mosque in Istanbul, Turkey, is an example of Ottoman imperial architecture.

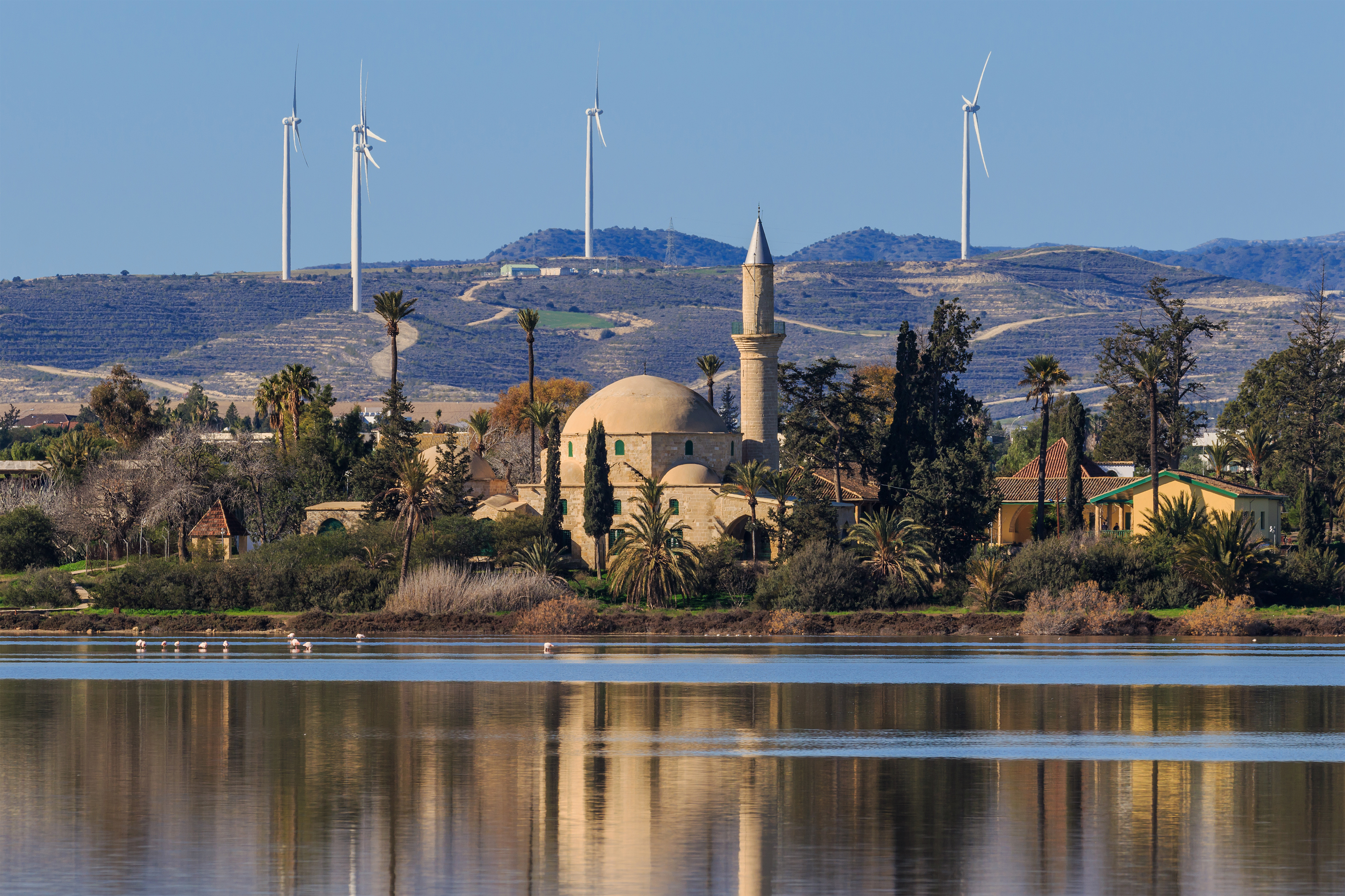
The Hala Sultan Tekke in Larnaca, Cyprus, is an example of Ottoman provincial architecture. As the resting place of Umm Haram, it is one of the holiest sites in Islam and an important pilgrimage site for the largely secular Turkish Cypriot community.

Most ethnic Turkish people are either practicing or non-practicing Muslims who follow the teachings of the Hanafi school of Sunni Islam. They form the largest Muslim community in Turkey and Northern Cyprus as well as the largest Muslim groups in Austria, Bulgaria, Czech Republic, Denmark, Germany, Liechtenstein, the Netherlands, Romania and Switzerland. In addition to Sunni Turks, there are Alevi Turks whose local Islamic traditions have been based in Anatolia, as well as the Bektashis traditionally centered in Anatolia and the Balkans.

In general, "Turkish Islam" is considered to be "more moderate and pluralistic" than in other Middle Eastern-Islamic societies. Historically, Turkish Sufi movements promoted liberal forms of Islam; for example, Turkish humanist groups and thinkers, such as the Mevlevis (whirling dervishes who follow Rumi), the Bektashis, and Yunus Emre emphasized faith over practicing Islam. During this tolerant environment under the Seljuk Turks, more Turkish tribes arriving in Anatolia during the 13th century found the liberal Sufi version of Islam closer to their shamanists traditions and chose to preserve some of their culture (such as dance and music). During the late Ottoman period, the Tanzimat policies introduced by the Ottoman intelligentsia fused Islam with modernization reforms; this was followed by Atatürk's secularist reforms in the 20th century.

Consequently, there are also many non-practicing Turkish Muslims who tend to be politically secular. For example, in Cyprus, the Turkish Cypriots are generally very secular and only attend mosques on special occasions (such as for weddings, funerals, and community gatherings). Even so, the Hala Sultan Tekke in Larnaca, which is the resting place of Umm Haram, is considered to be one of the holiest sites in Islam and remains an important pilgrimage site for the secular Turkish Cypriot community too. Similarly, in other urban areas of the Levant, such as in Iraq, the Turkish minority are mainly secular, having internalized the secularist interpretation of state–religion affairs practiced in the Republic of Turkey since its foundation in 1923.

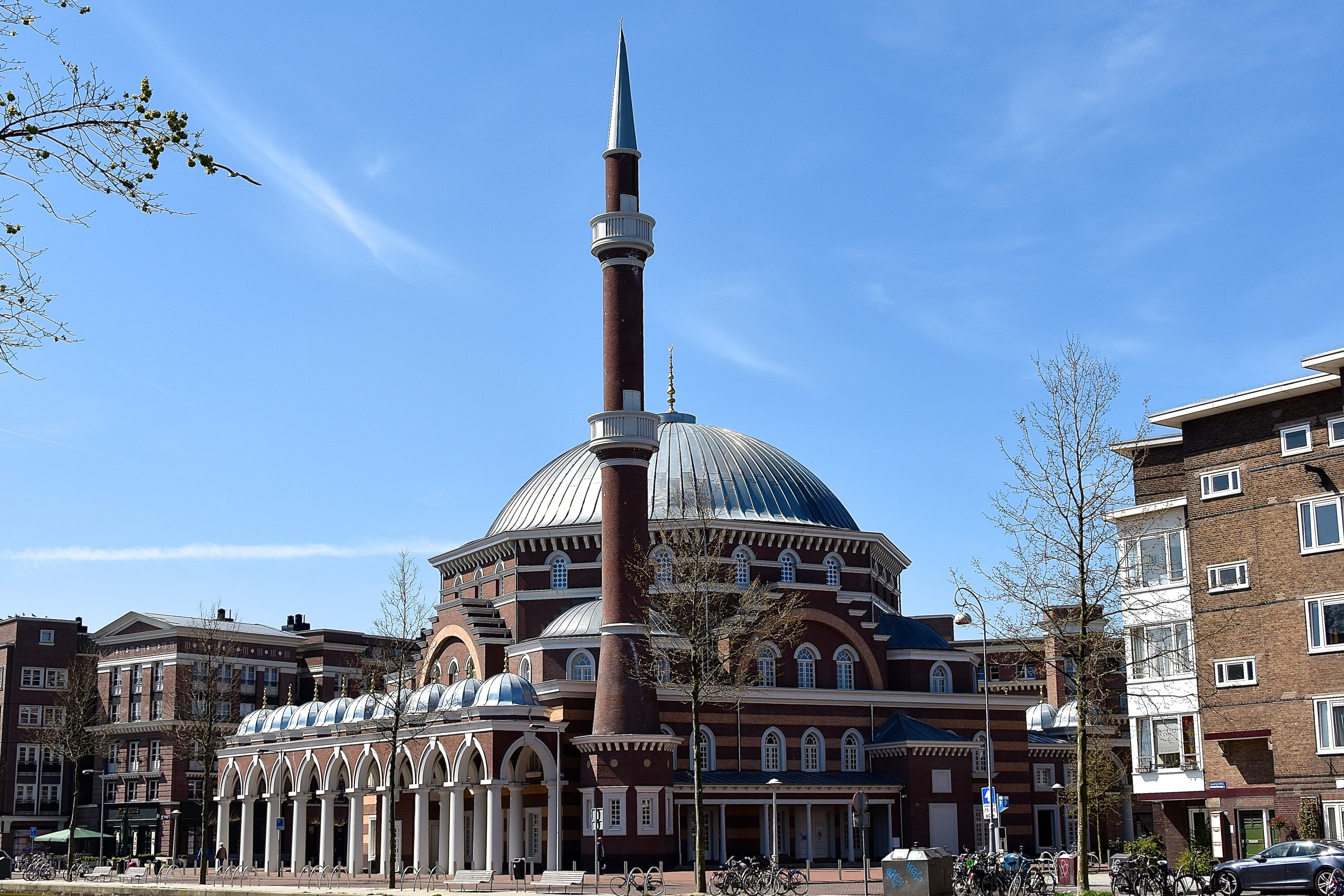
The neo-Ottoman Westermoskee in Amsterdam is the largest mosque in the Netherlands, and mostly serves the Turkish Dutch community.

In North Africa, the Turkish minorities have traditionally differentiated themselves from the Arab-Berber population who follow the Maliki school; this is because the Turks have continued to follow the teaching of the Hanafi school which was brought to the region by their ancestors during the Ottoman rule. Indeed, the Ottoman-Turkish mosques in the region are often distinguishable by pencil-like and octagonal minarets which were built in accordance with the traditions of the Hanafi rite.

The tradition of building mosques in the Ottoman-style (i.e. either in the imperial style based on Istanbul mosques or the provincial styles) has continued into the present day, both in traditional areas of settlement (e.g. in Turkey, the Balkans, Cyprus, and other parts of the Levant) as well as in Western Europe and North America where there are substantial immigrant communities.

Since the 1960s, "Turkish" was even seen as synonymous with "Muslim" in countries like Germany because Islam was considered to have a specific "Turkish character" and visual architectural style.

=== Arts and architecture ===
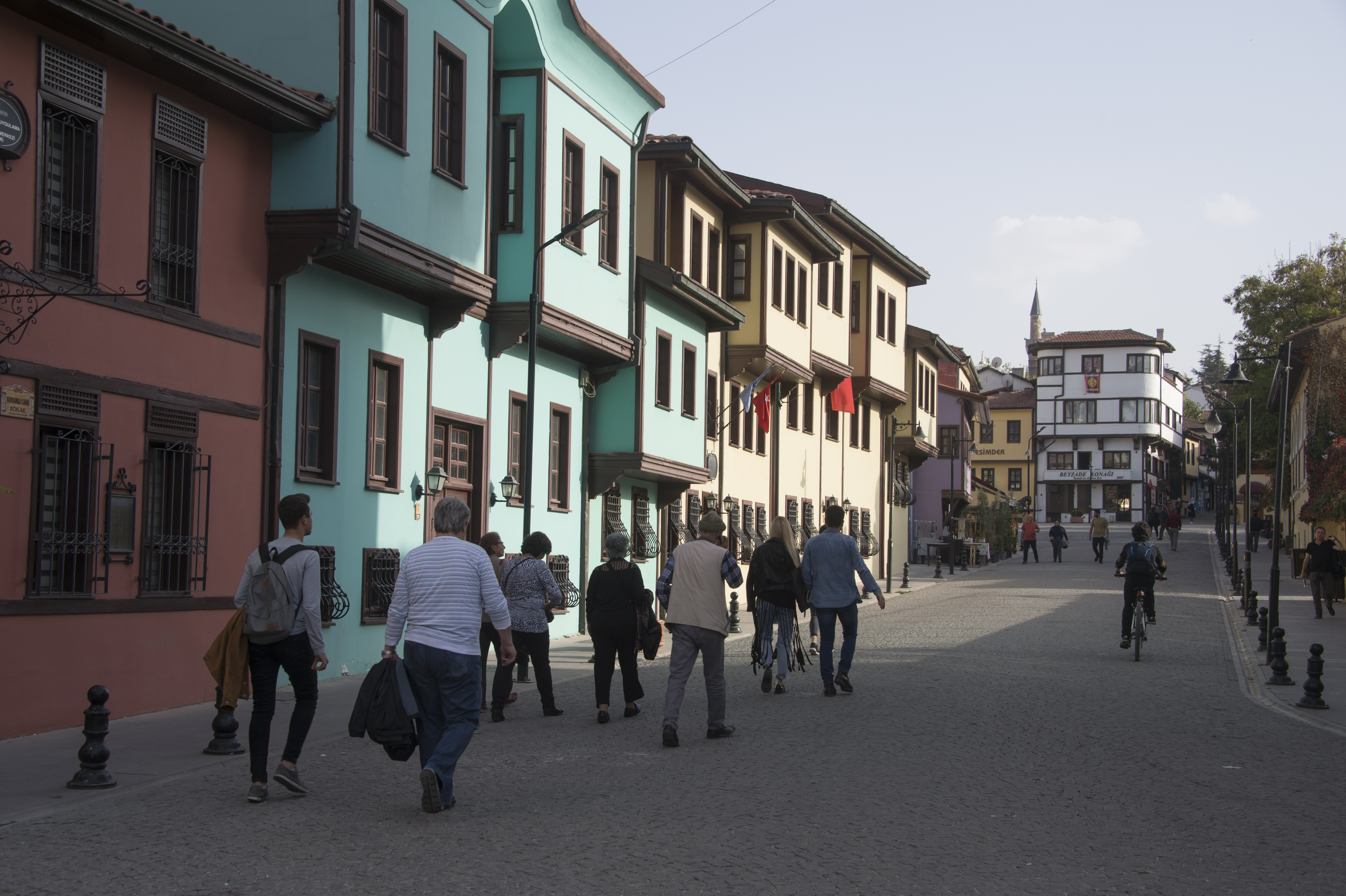
With its traditional Turkish architecture, Odunpazarı district in Eskişehir is a tentative UNESCO World Heritage site.

Turkish architecture reached its peak during the Ottoman period. Ottoman architecture, influenced by Seljuk, Byzantine and Islamic architecture, came to develop a style all of its own. Overall, Ottoman architecture has been described as a synthesis of the architectural traditions of the Mediterranean and the Middle East.

As Turkey successfully transformed from the religion-based former Ottoman Empire into a modern nation-state with a very strong separation of state and religion, an increase in the modes of artistic expression followed. During the first years of the republic, the government invested a large amount of resources into fine arts; such as museums, theatres, opera houses and architecture. Diverse historical factors play important roles in defining the modern Turkish identity. Turkish culture is a product of efforts to be a "modern" Western state, while maintaining traditional religious and historical values. The mix of cultural influences is dramatized, for example, in the form of the "new symbols of the clash and interlacing of cultures" enacted in the works of Orhan Pamuk, recipient of the 2006 Nobel Prize in Literature. Traditional Turkish music include Turkish folk music (Halk müziği), Fasıl and Ottoman classical music (Sanat müziği) that originates from the Ottoman court. Contemporary Turkish music include Turkish pop music, rock, and Turkish hip hop genres.

=== Science ===
Turkey's spending on research and development as a share of GDP has risen from 0.47% in 2000 to 1.40% in 2021. Turkey ranks 16th in the world in terms of article output in scientific and technical journals, and 35th in Nature Index. Turkish patent office ranks 21st worldwide in overall patent applications, and 3rd in industrial design applications. Vast majority of applicants to the Turkish patent office are Turkish residents. In all patent offices globally, Turkish residents rank 21st for overall patent applications. In 2023, Turkey ranked 39th in the world and 4th among its upper-middle income group in the Global Innovation Index. It was one of the countries with a notable increase in the past decade.

Contemporary Turkish scientists include Aziz Sancar, who won the Nobel Prize in Chemistry for his work on how cells repair damaged DNA. He is one of two Turkish Nobel laureates and the first in the sciences. Immunologists Uğur Şahin and Özlem Türeci founded BioNTech, which is the company that developed one of the first efficacious vaccines against COVID-19. Erdal Arıkan invented polar codes, which is a key component of 5G technologies. Mathematician Cahit Arf is known for Hasse–Arf theorem and Arf invariant. Physician Hulusi Behçet discovered Behçet's disease. Other contemporary scientists include neurologist Gazi Yaşargil, physicists Feza Gürsey and Behram Kurşunoğlu, and astrophysicists Burçin Mutlu-Pakdil and Feryal Özel.

== Genetics ==
Turkish genomic variation, along with several other West Asian populations, looks most similar to genomic variation of Southern European populations such as southern Italians. Data from ancient DNA – covering the Paleolithic, the Neolithic, and the Bronze Age periods – showed that West Asian genomes, including Turkish ones, have been greatly influenced by early agricultural populations in the area; later population movements, such as those of Turkic speakers, also contributed.

A 2014 whole genome sequencing study of Turkish genetics (on 16 individuals) concluded that the Turkish population forms a cluster with Southern European/Mediterranean populations, and the predicted contribution from ancestral East Asian and Central Asian populations is 21.7%. However, that is not a direct estimate of a migration rate, due to reasons such as unknown original contributing populations. Moreover, the genetic variation of various populations in Central Asia "has been poorly characterized"; West Asian populations may also be "closely related to populations in the east". Meanwhile, Central Asia is home to numerous populations that "demonstrate an array of mixed anthropological features of East Eurasians (EEA) and West Eurasians (WEA)"; two studies showed Uyghurs have 40-53% ancestry classified as East Asian, with the rest being classified as European. A 2006 study suggested that the true Central Asian contributions to Anatolia was 13% for males and 22% for females (with wide ranges of confidence intervals), and the language replacement in Turkey and Azerbaijan might not have been in accordance with the elite dominance model.

Another study in 2021, which looked at whole-genomes and whole-exomes of 3,362 unrelated Turkish samples, resulted in establishing the first Turkish variome. The study found mixing between peoples from the Caucasus, Middle East, and Southeastern Europe and other parts of Europe in line with the history of Turkey. Moreover, significant number of rare genome and exome variants were unique to modern-day Turkish population. Neighbouring populations in East and West, and Tuscan people in Italy were closest to Turkish population in terms of genetic similarity. Central Asian contribution to maternal, paternal, and autosomal genes were detected, consistent with the historical migration and expansion of Oghuz Turks from Central Asia. The authors speculated that the genetic similarity of the modern-day Turkish population with modern-day European populations might be due to spread of neolithic Anatolian farmers into Europe, which impacted the genetic makeup of modern-day European populations. Moreover, the study found no clear genetic separation between different regions of Turkey, leading authors to suggest that recent migration events within Turkey resulted in genetic homogenization.

A 2022 ancient-DNA study by Lazaridis et al., comparing more than 700 ancient genomes from Southern Europe and West Asia spanning 11,000 years with present-day populations, quantified the demographic impact of the Turkic migrations on Anatolia. Two-way unsupervised ADMIXTURE analysis of East Eurasian ancestry found 0% in Byzantine-era Anatolian individuals, approximately 9% in present-day Turkish individuals, and approximately 18% in a transitional 14th–17th-century population from the Aegean coastal site of Çapalıbağ. The admixture date estimated from the Çapalıbağ sample — about 12 generations, or roughly 340 years, before the individuals' time — is consistent with gene flow from Central Asian Turkic-speaking populations during the Seljuk and Ottoman periods. The authors concluded that present-day Turkish people carry the legacy both of ancient populations long resident in Anatolia and of people who came from Central Asia bearing Turkic languages. Genome-wide studies estimate the Central Asian genetic contribution to present-day Anatolian Turks at roughly 10% (≈9.6% in Kars et al. 2021; ~9–22% in Lazaridis et al. 2022), with the majority of their genome deriving from populations present in Anatolia and neighbouring regions before the Turkic migrations. Lazaridis et al. further model this local component as continuous with Roman/Byzantine-era Anatolians.

== See also ==
- Turkophilia
- Anti-Turkish sentiment
- Demographics of Turkey

== Notes ==
a: "The history of Turkey encompasses, first, the history of Anatolia before the coming of the Turks and of the civilizations—Hittite, Thracian, Hellenistic, and Byzantine—of which the Turkish nation is the heir by assimilation or example. Second, it includes the history of the Turkish peoples, including the Seljuks, who brought Islam and the Turkish language to Anatolia. Third, it is the history of the Ottoman Empire, a vast, cosmopolitan, pan-Islamic state that developed from a small Turkish amirate in Anatolia and that for centuries was a world power."

== Bibliography ==
- Abadan-Unat, Nermin (2011), Turks in Europe: From Guest Worker to Transnational Citizen, Berghahn Books, ISBN 978-1-84545-425-8.
- Abazov, Rafis (2009), Culture and Customs of Turkey, Greenwood Publishing Group, ISBN 978-0-313-34215-8.
- Abrahams, Fred (1996), A Threat to "Stability": Human Rights Violations in Macedonia, Human Rights Watch, ISBN 978-1-56432-170-1.
- Ágoston, Gábor (2010), "Introduction", in Ágoston, Gábor; Masters, Bruce Alan (eds.), Encyclopedia of the Ottoman Empire, Infobase Publishing, ISBN 978-1-4381-1025-7.
- Akar, Metin (1993), "Fas Arapçasında Osmanlı Türkçesinden Alınmış Kelimeler", Türklük Araştırmaları Dergisi, 7: 91–110.
- Akgündüz, Ahmet (2008), Labour migration from Turkey to Western Europe, 1960–1974: A multidisciplinary analysis, Ashgate Publishing, ISBN 978-0-7546-7390-3.
- Armour, Ian D. (2012). A History of Eastern Europe 1740-1918. London New York: Bloomsbury Academic. ISBN 978-1-84966-661-9.
- Aydıngün, Ayşegül; Harding, Çiğdem Balım; Hoover, Matthew; Kuznetsov, Igor; Swerdlow, Steve (2006), Meskhetian Turks: An Introduction to their History, Culture, and Resettelment Experiences, Center for Applied Linguistics, archived from the original on 29 October 2013.
- Babak, Vladimir; Vaisman, Demian; Wasserman, Aryeh (2004), Political Organization in Central Asia and Azerbaijan: Sources and Documents, Routledge, ISBN 978-0-7146-4838-5.
- Baedeker, Karl (2000), Egypt, Elibron, ISBN 978-1-4021-9705-5.
- Bainbridge, James (2009), Turkey, Lonely Planet, ISBN 978-1-74104-927-5.
- Baran, Zeyno (2010), Torn Country: Turkey Between Secularism and Islamism, Hoover Press, ISBN 978-0-8179-1144-7.
- Barthold, V., ed. (1962), The book of my grandfather Korkut, Moscow and Leningrad: USSR Academy of Sciences
- Bennigsen, Alexandre; Broxup, Marie (1983), The Islamic threat to the Soviet State, Taylor & Francis, ISBN 978-0-7099-0619-3.
- Biondich, Mark (2011). The Balkans Revolution, War, and Political Violence Since 1878. The United States: Oxford University Press. ISBN 978-0-19-929905-8.
- Blacklock, Denika (2005), Finding Durable Solutions for the Meskhetians (PDF), European Centre for Minority Issues, archived from the original (PDF) on 2 June 2010.
- Bokova, Irena (2010), "Reconstructions of Identities: Regional vs. National or Dynamics of Cultural Relations", in Ruegg, François; Boscoboinik, Andrea (eds.), From Palermo to Penang: A Journey Into Political Anthropology, LIT Verlag Münster, pp. 167–178, ISBN 978-3-643-80062-6
- Bogle, Emory C. (1998), Islam: Origin and Belief, University of Texas Press, ISBN 978-0-292-70862-4.
- Bosma, Ulbe; Lucassen, Jan; Oostindie, Gert (2012), "Introduction. Postcolonial Migrations and Identity Politics: Towards a Comparative Perspective", Postcolonial Migrants and Identity Politics: Europe, Russia, Japan and the United States in Comparison, Berghahn Books, ISBN 978-0-85745-327-3.
- Brendemoen, Bernt (2002), The Turkish Dialects of Trabzon: Analysis, Otto Harrassowitz Verlag, ISBN 978-3-447-04570-4.
- Brendemoen, Bernt (2006), "Ottoman or Iranian? An example of Turkic-Iranian language contact in East Anatolian dialects", in Johanson, Lars; Bulut, Christiane (eds.), Turkic-Iranian Contact Areas: Historical and Linguistic Aspects, Otto Harrassowitz Verlag, ISBN 978-3-447-05276-4.
- Brizic, Katharina; Yağmur, Kutlay (2008), "Mapping linguistic diversity in an emigration and immigration context: Case studies on Turkey and Austria", in Barni, Monica; Extra, Guus (eds.), Mapping Linguistic Diversity in Multicultural Contexts, Walter de Gruyter, p. 248, ISBN 978-3-11-020734-7.
- Brozba, Gabriela (2010), Between Reality and Myth: A Corpus-based Analysis of the Stereotypic Image of Some Romanian Ethnic Minorities, GRIN Verlag, ISBN 978-3-640-70386-9.
- Bruce, Anthony (2003), The Last Crusade. The Palestine Campaign in the First World War, John Murray, ISBN 978-0-7195-6505-2.
- Çaǧaptay, Soner (2006), "Passage to Turkishness: immigration and religion in modern Turkey", in Gülalp, Haldun (ed.), Citizenship And Ethnic Conflict: Challenging the Nation-state, Taylor & Francis, ISBN 978-0-415-36897-1.
- Çaǧaptay, Soner (2006a), Islam, Secularism, and Nationalism in Modern Turkey: Who is a Turk?, Taylor & Francis, ISBN 978-0-415-38458-2.
- Campbell, George L. (1998), Concise Compendium of the World's Languages, Psychology Press, ISBN 978-0-415-16049-0.
- Cassia, Paul Sant (2007), Bodies of Evidence: Burial, Memory, and the Recovery of Missing Persons in Cyprus, Berghahn Books, ISBN 978-1-84545-228-5.
- Chaurasia, Radhey Shyam (2005), History Of Middle East, Atlantic Publishers & Dist, ISBN 978-81-269-0448-8.
- Clauson, Gerard (1972). An Etymological Dictionary of Pre-thirteenth-century Turkish. Oxford University Press. ISBN 978-0-19-864112-4.
- Cleland, Bilal (2001), "The History of Muslims in Australia", in Saeed, Abdullah; Akbarzadeh, Shahram (eds.), Muslim Communities in Australia, University of New South Wales, ISBN 978-0-86840-580-3.
- Clogg, Richard (2002), Minorities in Greece, Hurst & Co. Publishers, ISBN 978-1-85065-706-4.
- Constantin, Daniela L.; Goschin, Zizi; Dragusin, Mariana (2008), "Ethnic entrepreneurship as an integration factor in civil society and a gate to religious tolerance. A spotlight on Turkish entrepreneurs in Romania", Journal for the Study of Religions and Ideologies, 7 (20): 28–41
- Cornell, Svante E. (2001), Small Nations and Great Powers: A Study of Ethnopolitical Conflict in the Caucasus, Routledge, ISBN 978-0-7007-1162-8.
- Council of Europe (2006), Documents: working papers, 2005 ordinary session (second part), 25-29 April 2005, Vol. 3: Documents 10407, 10449-10533, Council of Europe, ISBN 92-871-5754-5.
- Damgaard, P. B.; et al. (9 May 2018), "137 ancient human genomes from across the Eurasian steppes", Nature, 557 (7705), Nature Research: 369–373, Bibcode:2018Natur.557..369D, doi:10.1038/s41586-018-0094-2, hdl:1887/3202709, PMID 29743675, S2CID 13670282.
- Darke, Diana (2011), Eastern Turkey, Bradt Travel Guides, ISBN 978-1-84162-339-9.
- Delibaşı, Melek (1994), "The Era of Yunus Emre and Turkish Humanism", Yunus Emre: Spiritual Experience and Culture, Università Gregoriana, ISBN 978-88-7652-674-9.
- Duiker, William J.; Spielvogel, Jackson J. (2012), World History, Cengage Learning, ISBN 978-1-111-83165-3.
- Elsie, Robert (2010), Historical Dictionary of Kosovo, Scarecrow Press, ISBN 978-0-8108-7231-8.
- Eminov, Ali (1997), Turkish and other Muslim minorities in Bulgaria, C. Hurst & Co. Publishers, ISBN 978-1-85065-319-6.
- Ergener, Rashid; Ergener, Resit (2002), About Turkey: Geography, Economy, Politics, Religion, and Culture, Pilgrims Process, ISBN 978-0-9710609-6-8.
- Evans, Thammy (2010), Macedonia, Bradt Travel Guides, ISBN 978-1-84162-297-2.
- Farkas, Evelyn N. (2003), Fractured States and U.S. Foreign Policy: Iraq, Ethiopia, and Bosnia in the 1990s, Palgrave Macmillan, ISBN 978-1-4039-6373-4.
- Faroqhi, Suraiya (2005), Subjects Of The Sultan: Culture And Daily Life In The Ottoman Empire, I.B.Tauris, ISBN 978-1-85043-760-4.
- Findley, Carter V. (2005), The Turks in World History, Oxford University Press, ISBN 978-0-19-517726-8.
- Fleet, Kate (1999), European and Islamic Trade in the Early Ottoman State: The Merchants of Genoa and Turkey, Cambridge University Press, ISBN 978-0-521-64221-7.
- Friedman, Victor A. (2003), Turkish in Macedonia and Beyond: Studies in Contact, Typology and other Phenomena in the Balkans and the Caucasus, Otto Harrassowitz Verlag, ISBN 978-3-447-04640-4.
- Friedman, Victor A. (2006), "Western Rumelian Turkish in Macedonia and adjacent areas", in Boeschoten, Hendrik; Johanson, Lars (eds.), Turkic Languages in Contact, Otto Harrassowitz Verlag, ISBN 978-3-447-05212-2.
- Gibney, Matthew J.; Hansen, Randall (2005). Immigration and asylum: from 1900 to the present. Santa Barbara: ABC-CLIO. ISBN 978-1-57607-796-2.
- Gibson, Jerry D., ed. (2017). Mobile Communications Handbook (3 ed.). CRC Press. ISBN 978-1-4398-1724-7.
- Gogolin, Ingrid (2002), Guide for the Development of Language Education Policies in Europe: From Linguistic Diversity to Plurilingual Education (PDF), Council of Europe.
- Göcek, Fatma Müge (2011), The Transformation of Turkey: Redefining State and Society from the Ottoman Empire to the Modern Era, I.B.Tauris, ISBN 978-1-84885-611-0.
- Hatay, Mete (2007), Is the Turkish Cypriot Population Shrinking? (PDF), International Peace Research Institute, ISBN 978-82-7288-244-9, archived from the original (PDF) on 1 January 2014.
- Haviland, William A.; Prins, Harald E. L.; Walrath, Dana; McBride, Bunny (2010), Anthropology: The Human Challenge, Cengage Learning, ISBN 978-0-495-81084-1.
- Heper, Metin; Öztürk-Tunçel, Duygu; Criss, Nur Bilge (2018). Historical Dictionary of Turkey (4 ed.). Rowman & Littlefield. ISBN 978-1-5381-0225-1.
- Hizmetli, Sabri (1953), "Osmanlı Yönetimi Döneminde Tunus ve Cezayir'in Eğitim ve Kültür Tarihine Genel Bir Bakış" (PDF), Ankara Üniversitesi İlahiyat Fakültesi Dergisi, 32: 1–12.
- Hodoğlugil, Uğur; Mahley, Robert W. (2012), "Turkish Population Structure and Genetic Ancestry Reveal Relatedness among Eurasian Populations", Annals of Human Genetics, 76 (2): 128–141, doi:10.1111/j.1469-1809.2011.00701.x, PMC 4904778, PMID 22332727.
- Home Affairs Committee (2011), Implications for the Justice and Home Affairs area of the accession of Turkey to the European Union (PDF), The Stationery Office, ISBN 978-0-215-56114-5.
- Hopkins, Liza (2011), "A Contested Identity: Resisting the Category Muslim-Australian", Immigrants & Minorities, 29 (1): 110–131, doi:10.1080/02619288.2011.553139, S2CID 145324792.
- Howard, Douglas A. (2016). The History of Turkey (2nd ed.). Santa Barbara, California: Greenwood. ISBN 978-1-4408-3466-0.
- Hüssein, Serkan (2007), Yesterday & Today: Turkish Cypriots of Australia, Serkan Hussein, ISBN 978-0-646-47783-1.
- İhsanoğlu, Ekmeleddin (2005), "Institutionalisation of Science in the Medreses of Pre-Ottoman and Ottoman Turkey", in Irzik, Gürol; Güzeldere, Güven (eds.), Turkish Studies in the History And Philosophy of Science, Springer, ISBN 978-1-4020-3332-2.
- Ilican, Murat Erdal (2011), "Cypriots, Turkish", in Cole, Jeffrey (ed.), Ethnic Groups of Europe: An Encyclopedia, ABC-CLIO, ISBN 978-1-59884-302-6.
- Jawhar, Raber Tal'at (2010), "The Iraqi Turkmen Front", in Catusse, Myriam; Karam, Karam (eds.), Returning to Political Parties?, Co-éditions, The Lebanese Center for Policy Studies, pp. 313–328, ISBN 978-1-886604-75-9.
- Johanson, Lars (2001), Discoveries on the Turkic Linguistic Map (PDF), Stockholm: Svenska Forskningsinstitutet i Istanbul
- Johanson, Lars (2011), "Multilingual states and empires in the history of Europe: the Ottoman Empire", in Kortmann, Bernd; Van Der Auwera, Johan (eds.), The Languages and Linguistics of Europe: A Comprehensive Guide, Volume 2, Walter de Gruyter, ISBN 978-3-11-022025-4
- Kaldellis, Anthony (2024). The New Roman Empire: A History of Byzantium. Oxford University Press. doi:10.1093/oso/9780197549322.001.0001. ISBN 978-0-19-754932-2.
- Kaplan, Robert D. (2002), "Who Are the Turks?", in Villers, James (ed.), Travelers' Tales Turkey: True Stories, Travelers' Tales, ISBN 978-1-885211-82-8.
- Karpat, Kemal H. (2000), "Historical Continuity and Identity Change or How to be Modern Muslim, Ottoman, and Turk", in Karpat, Kemal H. (ed.), Studies on Turkish Politics and Society: Selected Articles and Essays, BRILL, ISBN 978-90-04-11562-0.
- Karpat, K.H. (2001). The Politicization of Islam: Reconstructing Identity, State, Faith, and Community in the Late Ottoman State. Studies in Middle Eastern history. Oxford University Press. ISBN 978-0-19-513618-0.
- Karpat, Kemal H. (2004), Studies on Turkish Politics and Society: Selected Articles and Essays, Leiden Boston: BRILL, ISBN 978-90-04-13322-8.
- Kasaba, Reşat (2008), The Cambridge History of Turkey: Turkey in the Modern World, Cambridge University Press, ISBN 978-0-521-62096-3.
- Kasaba, Reşat (2009), A Moveable Empire: Ottoman Nomads, Migrants, and Refugees, University of Washington Press, ISBN 978-0-295-98948-8.
- Kaser, Karl (2011). The Balkans and the Near East: Introduction to a Shared History. Berlin Wien: LIT Verlag Münster. ISBN 978-3-643-50190-5.
- Kermeli, Eugenia (2010), "Byzantine Empire", in Ágoston, Gábor; Masters, Bruce Alan (eds.), Encyclopedia of the Ottoman Empire, Infobase Publishing, ISBN 978-1-4381-1025-7.
- Khazanov, Anatoly Michailovich (1995), After the USSR: Ethnicity, Nationalism and Politics in the Commonwealth of Independent States, University of Wisconsin Press, ISBN 978-0-299-14894-2.
- Kia, Mehrdad (2011), Daily Life in the Ottoman Empire, ABC-CLIO, ISBN 978-0-313-06402-9.
- Kirişci, Kemal (2006), "Migration and Turkey: the dynamics of state, society and politics", in Kasaba, Reşat (ed.), The Cambridge History of Turkey: Turkey in the Modern World, Cambridge University Press, ISBN 978-0-521-62096-3.
- Knowlton, MaryLee (2005), Macedonia, Marshall Cavendish, ISBN 978-0-7614-1854-2.
- Köprülü, Mehmet Fuat (1992), The Origins of the Ottoman Empire, SUNY Press, ISBN 978-0-7914-0820-9.
- Kötter, I; Vonthein, R; Günaydin, I; Müller, C; Kanz, L; Zierhut, M; Stübiger, N (2003), "Behçet's Disease in Patients of German and Turkish Origin- A Comparative Study", in Zouboulis, Christos (ed.), Advances in Experimental Medicine and Biology, Volume 528, Springer, ISBN 978-0-306-47757-7.
- Kurbanov, Rafik Osman-Ogly; Kurbanov, Erjan Rafik-Ogly (1995), "Religion and Politics in the Caucasus", in Bourdeaux, Michael (ed.), The Politics of Religion in Russia and the New States of Eurasia, M.E. Sharpe, ISBN 978-1-56324-357-8.
- Kushner, David (1997), "Self-Perception and Identity in Contemporary Turkey", Journal of Contemporary History, 32 (2): 219–233, doi:10.1177/002200949703200206, S2CID 159374632
- Laczko, Frank; Stacher, Irene; von Koppenfels, Amanda Klekowski (2002), New challenges for Migration Policy in Central and Eastern Europe, Cambridge University Press, p. 187, ISBN 978-90-6704-153-9.
- Law, Jonathan; Martin, Elizabeth, eds. (2020). Concise Medical Dictionary (10 ed.). Oxford University Press. doi:10.1093/acref/9780198836612.001.0001. ISBN 978-0-19-883661-2.
- Lee, Joo-Yup; Kuang, Shuntu (18 October 2017), "A Comparative Analysis of Chinese Historical Sources and Y-DNA Studies with Regard to the Early and Medieval Turkic Peoples", Inner Asia, 19 (2), Brill: 197–239, doi:10.1163/22105018-12340089, ISSN 2210-5018.
- Lee, Joo-Yup (2023). The Turkic Peoples in World History. Routledge. doi:10.4324/9781003256496. ISBN 978-1-000-90421-5.
- Leiser, Gary (2005), "Turks", in Meri, Josef W. (ed.), Medieval Islamic Civilization, Routledge, p. 837, ISBN 978-0-415-96690-0.
- Leonard, Thomas M., ed. (2006). Encyclopedia of the Developing World. Routledge. doi:10.4324/9780203943373. ISBN 978-1-57958-388-0.
  - Ahmed, Ali. "Turkey". In Leonard (2006), pp. 1575–1578.
- Leveau, Remy; Hunter, Shireen T. (2002), "Islam in France", in Hunter, Shireen (ed.), Islam, Europe's Second Religion: The New Social, Cultural, and Political Landscape, Greenwood Publishing Group, ISBN 978-0-275-97609-5.
- Levine, Lynn A. (2010), Frommer's Turkey, John Wiley & Sons, ISBN 978-0-470-59366-0.
- Li, Tao; et al. (June 2020), "Millet agriculture dispersed from Northeast China to the Russian Far East: Integrating archaeology, genetics, and linguistics", Archaeological Research in Asia, 22 100177, Elsevier, doi:10.1016/j.ara.2020.100177, hdl:21.11116/0000-0005-D82B-8.
- McMahon, Gregory; Steadman, Sharon, eds. (2012). The Oxford Handbook of Ancient Anatolia: (10,000-323 BCE). Oxford University Press. doi:10.1093/oxfordhb/9780195376142.001.0001. ISBN 978-0-19-537614-2.
  - McMahon, Gregory; Steadman, Sharon (2012a). "Introduction: The Oxford Handbook of Ancient Anatolia". In McMahon & Steadman (2012), pp. 3–12. doi:10.1093/oxfordhb/9780195376142.013.0001
  - McMahon, Gregory. "The Land and Peoples of Anatolia through Ancient Eyes". In McMahon & Steadman (2012), pp. 15–33. doi:10.1093/oxfordhb/9780195376142.013.0002
  - Matthews, Roger. "A History of the Preclassical Archaeology of Anatolia". In McMahon & Steadman (2012), pp. 34–55. doi:10.1093/oxfordhb/9780195376142.013.0003
  - Steadman, Sharon. "The Early Bronze Age on the Plateau". In McMahon & Steadman (2012), pp. 229–259. doi:10.1093/oxfordhb/9780195376142.013.0010
  - Michel, Cécile. "The Kārum Period on the Plateau". In McMahon & Steadman (2012), pp. 313–336. doi:10.1093/oxfordhb/9780195376142.013.0013
  - Sams, G. Kenneth. "Anatolia: The First Millennium BCE in Historical Context". In McMahon & Steadman (2012), pp. 604–622. doi:10.1093/oxfordhb/9780195376142.013.0027
  - Melchert, H. Craig. "Indo-Europeans". In McMahon & Steadman (2012), pp. 704–716. doi:10.1093/oxfordhb/9780195376142.013.0031
- Minahan, James (2002), Encyclopedia of the Stateless Nations: L-R, Greenwood Publishing Group, ISBN 978-0-313-32111-5.
- Meeker, M. E. (1971), "The Black Sea Turks: Some Aspects of Their Ethnic and Cultural Background", International Journal of Middle East Studies, 2 (4): 318–345, doi:10.1017/s002074380000129x, S2CID 162611158.
- Nelson, Sarah; et al. (14 February 2020), "Tracing population movements in ancient East Asia through the linguistics and archaeology of textile production", Evolutionary Human Sciences, 2 (e5), Cambridge University Press: e5, doi:10.1017/ehs.2020.4, PMC 10427276, PMID 37588355.
- Oçak, Ahmet Yaçar (2012), "Islam in Asia Minor", in El Hareir, Idris; M'Baye, Ravane (eds.), Different Aspects of Islamic Culture: Vol.3: The Spread of Islam Throughout the World, UNESCO, ISBN 978-92-3-104153-2.
- Orhan, Oytun (2010), The Forgotten Turks: Turkmens of Lebanon (PDF), ORSAM, archived from the original (PDF) on 3 March 2016.
- Özkaya, Abdi Noyan (2007), "Suriye Kürtleri: Siyasi Etkisizlik ve Suriye Devleti'nin Politikaları" (PDF), Review of International Law and Politics, 2 (8), archived from the original (PDF) on 24 January 2011.
- Öztürkmen, Ali; Duman, Bilgay; Orhan, Oytun (2011), Suriye'de değişim ortaya çıkardığı toplum: Suriye Türkmenleri, ORSAM.
- Pan, Chia-Lin (1949), "The Population of Libya", Population Studies, 3 (1): 100–125, doi:10.1080/00324728.1949.10416359.
- Park, Bill (2005), Turkey's policy towards northern Iraq: problems and perspectives, Taylor & Francis, ISBN 978-0-415-38297-7.
- Pekesen, Berna (7 March 2012). "Expulsion and Emigration of the Muslims from the Balkans". European History Online. Leibniz Institute of European History. Archived from the original on 20 February 2024.
- Pentikäinen, Oskari; Trier, Tom (2004), Between Integration and Resettlement: The Meskhetian Turks, European Centre For Minority Issues.
- Phillips, David L. (2006), Losing Iraq: Inside the Postwar Reconstruction Fiasco, Basic Books, ISBN 978-0-465-05681-1.
- Phinnemore, David (2006), The EU and Romania: Accession and Beyond, The Federal Trust for Education & Research, ISBN 978-1-903403-78-5.
- Polian, Pavel (2004), Against Their will: The History and Geography of Forced Migrations in the USSR, Central European University Press, ISBN 978-963-9241-68-8.
- Quataert, Donald (2000), The Ottoman Empire, 1700–1922, Cambridge University Press, ISBN 978-0-521-63328-4.
- Ryazantsev, Sergey V. (2009), "Turkish Communities in the Russian Federation" (PDF), International Journal on Multicultural Societies, 11 (2): 155–173.
- Robbeets, Martine (1 January 2017), "Austronesian influence and Transeurasian ancestry in Japanese", Language Dynamics and Change, 8 (2), Brill: 210–251, doi:10.1163/22105832-00702005, hdl:11858/00-001M-0000-002E-8635-7, ISSN 2210-5832.
- Robbeets, Martine (2020), "The Transeurasian homeland: where, what and when?", in Robbeets, Martine; Savelyev, Alexander (eds.), The Oxford Guide to the Transeurasian Languages, Oxford University Press, ISBN 978-0-19-880462-8.
- Saeed, Abdullah (2003), Islam in Australia, Allen & Unwin, ISBN 978-1-86508-864-8.
- Sagona, Antonio; Zimansky, Paul (2015). Ancient Turkey. Routledge. doi:10.4324/9780203880463. ISBN 978-1-134-44027-6.
- Saunders, John Joseph (1965), "The Turkish Irruption", A History of Medieval Islam, Routledge, ISBN 978-0-415-05914-5.
- Scarce, Jennifer M. (2003), Women's Costume of the Near and Middle East, Routledge, ISBN 978-0-7007-1560-2.
- Seher, Cesur-Kılıçaslan; Terzioğlu, Günsel (2012), "Families Immigrating from Bulgaria to Turkey Since 1878", in Roth, Klaus; Hayden, Robert (eds.), Migration In, From, and to Southeastern Europe: Historical and Cultural Aspects, Volume 1, LIT Verlag Münster, ISBN 978-3-643-10895-1.
- Shaw, Stanford J. (1976), History of the Ottoman Empire and Modern Turkey Volume 1, Empire of the Gazis: The Rise and Decline of the Ottoman Empire 1280–1808, Cambridge University Press, ISBN 978-0-521-29163-7.
- Somel, Selçuk Akşin (2003), Historical Dictionary of the Ottoman Empire, Scarecrow Press, ISBN 978-0-8108-4332-5.
- Sosyal, Levent (2011), "Turks", in Cole, Jeffrey (ed.), Ethnic Groups of Europe: An Encyclopedia, ABC-CLIO, ISBN 978-1-59884-302-6.
- Stansfield, Gareth R. V. (2007), Iraq: People, History, Politics, Polity, ISBN 978-0-7456-3227-8.
- Stavrianos, Leften Stavros (2000), The Balkans Since 1453, C. Hurst & Co. Publishers, ISBN 978-1-85065-551-0.
- Stokes, Jamie; Gorman, Anthony (2010a), "Turkic Peoples", Encyclopedia of the Peoples of Africa and the Middle East, Infobase Publishing, ISBN 978-1-4381-2676-0.
- Stokes, Jamie; Gorman, Anthony (2010b), "Turks: nationality", Encyclopedia of the Peoples of Africa and the Middle East, Infobase Publishing, ISBN 978-1-4381-2676-0.
- Tasar, Eren; Frank, Allen J.; Eden, Jeff, eds. (2021). From the Khan's Oven: Studies on the History of Central Asian Religions in Honor of Devin Deweese. BRILL. ISBN 978-90-04-47018-7.
- Taylor, Scott (2004), Among the Others: Encounters with the Forgotten Turkmen of Iraq, Esprit de Corps Books, ISBN 978-1-895896-26-8.
- Tomlinson, Kathryn (2005), "Living Yesterday in Today and Tomorrow: Meskhetian Turks in Southern Russia", in Crossley, James G.; Karner, Christian (eds.), Writing History, Constructing Religion, Ashgate Publishing, ISBN 978-0-7546-5183-3.
- Twigg, Stephen; Schaefer, Sarah; Austin, Greg; Parker, Kate (2005), Turks in Europe: Why are we afraid? (PDF), The Foreign Policy Centre, ISBN 978-1-903558-79-9, archived from the original (PDF) on 9 July 2011
- Uchiyama, Junzo; et al. (21 May 2020). "Populations dynamics in Northern Eurasian forests: a long-term perspective from Northeast Asia". Evolutionary Human Sciences. 2 e16. Cambridge University Press. doi:10.1017/ehs.2020.11. PMC 10427466. PMID 37588381. Text was copied from this source, which is available under a Creative Commons Attribution 4.0 International License.
- UNESCO (2009), Diversité culturelle et dialogue interculturel en Tunisie, Commission nationale tunisienne pour l'éducation
- UNHCR (1999a), Background Paper on Refugees and Asylum Seekers from Azerbaijan (PDF), United Nations High Commissioner for Refugees.
- UNHCR (1999b), Background Paper on Refugees and Asylum Seekers from Georgia (PDF), United Nations High Commissioner for Refugees.
- Whitman, Lois (1990), Destroying ethnic identity: the Turks of Greece, Human Rights Watch, ISBN 978-0-929692-70-8.
- Wolf-Gazo, Ernest (1996), "John Dewey in Turkey: An Educational Mission", Journal of American Studies of Turkey, 3: 15–42, archived from the original on 27 April 2014
- World Intellectual Property Organization (WIPO) (2023). Global Innovation Index 2023: Innovation in the face of uncertainty (PDF) (Report). Geneva: WIPO. doi:10.34667/tind.48220. Archived (PDF) from the original on 25 April 2024.
- Yardumian, Aram; Schurr, Theodore G. (2011), "Who Are the Anatolian Turks? A Reappraisal of the Anthropological Genetic Evidence", Anthropology & Archeology of Eurasia, 50 (1): 6–42, doi:10.2753/AAE1061-1959500101, S2CID 142580885
- Yiangou, Anastasia (2010), Cyprus in World War II: Politics and Conflict in the Eastern Mediterranean, I.B.Tauris, ISBN 978-1-84885-436-9.
- Zeytinoğlu, Güneş N.; Bonnabeau, Richard F.; Eşkinat, Rana (2012), "Ethnopolitical Conflict in Turkey: Turkish Armenians: From Nationalism to Diaspora", in Landis, Dan; Albert, Rosita D. (eds.), Handbook of Ethnic Conflict: International Perspectives, Springer, ISBN 978-1-4614-0447-7.
