= Human rights in Greece =

Human rights in Greece are observed by various organizations. The country is a signatory to the European Convention on Human Rights, the Geneva Convention relating to the Status of Refugees and the United Nations Convention Against Torture. The Greek constitution also guarantees fundamental human rights to all Greek citizens.

== Current issues ==
=== Police brutality ===
Excessive use for force, torture and other ill-treatment by police officers and other law enforcement officials has been reported.

The Greek Police, known officially as the Hellenic Police, assumed their current structure in 1984 as a result of merging the Gendarmerie (Chorofylaki) and the Urban Police Forces (Astynomia Poleon). Composed of central and regional departments, the Hellenic Police have a relatively long history of police brutality. One of the first documented incidents dates back to 1976, where 16-year-old activist Sideris Isidoropoulos was killed by police while he put up campaign posters on a public building. In 1980, during a demonstration commemorating the Athens Polytechnic uprising, 20-year-old protester Stamatina Kanelopoulou and 24-year-old Iakovos Koumis were beaten to death by the Greek police. The protests still occur to this day for protesters to commemorate the 1973 uprising. The protests are still commonly affected by police brutality around the time of the event. On 17 November 1985 another protester, 15-year-old Michalis Kaltezas, was murdered by the police during the demonstration commemorating the Polytechnic uprising.

The level and severity of police brutality in Greece over the last few years have been profound. Due to the recent financial crisis, many austerity measures have been enforced, resulting in many individuals and families struggling to survive. Greek citizens opposed these austerity measures from the beginning and showed their disapproval with strikes and demonstrations. In response, police brutality has significantly increased, with consistent reports on the use of tear gas, severe injuries inflicted by the police force, and unjustified detention of protesters.

In 2013 Greek police allegedly tortured four young men believed to be bank robbery suspects following their arrest. It was claimed that the men were hooked and severely beaten in detention. The media published photos of the men, all with severe bruising, though the police's press release showed digitally manipulated photos of the four without injuries. The Greek minister of citizen protection—Nikos Dendias—supported the police and claimed that they needed to use Photoshop to ensure the suspects were recognisable. In October 2012, 15 anti-fascist protesters were arrested in Athens when they clashed with supporters of the fascist party (and later deemed a criminal organization) "Golden Dawn". Victims claimed they were tortured while being held at the Attica General Police Directorate and stated that police officers slapped them, spat on them, burnt their arms with cigarette lighters, and kept them awake with flashlights and lasers. Dendias countered by accusing the British newspaper that published the details of these crimes of libel. It was proven by forensic examination that the torture had taken place. The two Greek journalists who commented on The Guardian report the next day were fired.

Police brutality in Greece today predominantly manifests itself in the form of unjustified and extreme physical violence towards protesters and journalists. Amnesty International highlights that the continued targeting of journalists is concerning as it infringes on the right to freedom of expression. According to a recent Amnesty International report, there have been multiple instances in which police have used excessive brutal force, misused less-lethal weapons against protesters, attacked journalists, and subjected bystanders to ill-treatment, particularly over the course of the anniversary of the Athens Polytechnic uprising, which took place on 17 November 2014. Allegations against police have emerged specifically concerning their use of unprovoked brutal force towards journalists documenting the demonstration and against many students who partook in a peaceful protest. Police allegedly sprayed protesters with chemical irritants from close range – in one instance a 17-year-old girl with asthma had been treated in the hospital after this attack and when she informed police of her condition they laughed.

Video footage confirmed that on 13 November 2014, riot police began to strike students who attempted to run away from the grounds of Athens Polytechnic. Media reports suggest that around 40 protesters had to seek subsequent medical attention to injuries sustained from brutal police beatings. Amnesty International called for action to prosecute those who were behind the assaults, stating that within the Greek police there is a culture of "abuse and impunity" which remains as authorities have taken very little action to address the root of the problem.

A German exchange student said he was beaten randomly by riot police in the Exarheia district, stating his only reason for being there was that he was eating with other students. The student gave a horrifying description of the violence he endured and cowered in a corner when he saw police because a few weeks before he had witnessed police beating a man they had arrested. He claimed that upon spotting him, about six police officers began assaulting him with their batons, and when they left they were replaced by another group of police. The student was unarmed and posed no threat but the police were ruthlessly brutal in their actions. It has been indicated that riot police left beaten and gravely injured individuals without any medical assistance. Amnesty International urges Greece to effectively and promptly investigate these crimes against civilians, which violate human rights, and hold perpetrators accountable.

- May 2011: student Yannis Kafkas suffered an almost fatal head injury after a police officer hit him with a fire extinguisher. Kafkas spent 20 days in intensive care.
- June 2011: Manolis Kipraios, journalist, was covering protests against austerity measures when a member of the riot police fired a stun grenade at him and caused him to suffer from permanent hearing loss.
- February 2012: photojournalist Marios Lolos had to have surgery done after being beaten in the head by police at a protest. The day before this attack another journalist Rena Maniou was allegedly severely beaten by security forces. Dimitris Trimis, the head of The Greek Journalist Association (ESEA) broke his arm after he was violently pushed and kicked by police.

There have been instances where protesters were used as human shields – a photo of a female protester in handcuffs ahead of policeman as people threw rocks at the police has gained considerable media attention.

None of the cases of police brutality above resulted in any prosecution of police force members. One case that sparked nationwide riots was the death of 15-year-old Alexis Grigoropoulos, who was shot dead by a police officer in December 2008 during demonstrations in Athens, sparkling large riots against police brutality. Unlike other cases, the police officer responsible was convicted of murder.

Reports of police brutality have again increased in the end of 2019, including against journalists and students demonstrating against the abolition of a law restricting officers from accessing university campuses. Arbitrary strip-searches have been documented in a variety of cases as part of the ill-treatment. There were significant suspicions that these frequent events were not rare and were not immune to the omnipresent atmosphere of impunity for such behavior.

=== Conscientious objection ===
In 2020, Amnesty International reported that a continuation of "serious violations" of the rights of conscientious objectors occurred resulting in arrests, prosecutions, fines, trials in military courts, repeated punishment and suspended prison sentences. The replacement service is also much longer than the military service and is therefore regarded as a punishment for prisoners of conscience.

== Amnesty International ==
According to Amnesty International's 2007 report on Greece, there are problems in the following areas:

- Treatment of migrants and refugees by the Greek police.
- Treatment of conscientious objectors to military service.
- Failure to grant necessary protection to women victims of domestic violence or trafficking and forced prostitution.
- The report also highlights cases involving arbitrary arrests in the context of the 'war on terror' and Greece's conviction by the European Court of Human Rights for violating Article 9 of the European Convention on Human Rights by convicting an unofficial mufti for 'usurping the function of a minister of a "known religion"'.

== US State Department ==
The US Department of State's 2007 report on human rights in Greece identified the following issues:

- Cases of abuse by security forces, particularly of illegal immigrants and Roma.
- Overcrowding and harsh conditions in some prisons.
- Detention of undocumented migrants in squalid conditions.
- Restrictions and administrative obstacles faced by members of non‑Orthodox religions.
- Detention and deportation of unaccompanied or separated immigrant minors, including asylum seekers.
- Limits on the ability of ethnic minority groups to self-identify, and discrimination against and social exclusion of ethnic minorities, particularly Roma.

== International rankings ==
- Democracy Index, 2020: 39 out of 167.
- Worldwide Press Freedom Index, 2022: 108 out of 180.
- Worldwide Privacy Index, 2006: 1 out of 26.
- Worldwide Quality-of-life Index, 2022: 44 out of 87.

== See also ==
- 1990 Komotini events
- Conscription in Greece
- Greek case
- Internet censorship and surveillance in Greece
- LGBT rights in Greece
- Minorities in Greece
- Slavic speakers of Greek Macedonia
- Sotiris Bletsas, an architect and Aromanian language activist.
- Turks of Western Thrace
