= 1990 Komotini events =

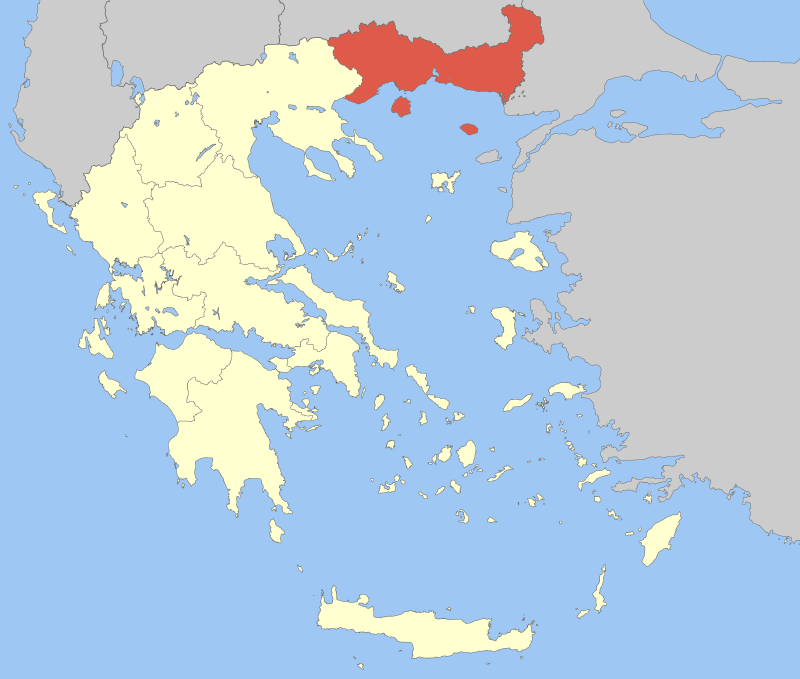
Komotini is located in the region of Eastern Macedonia and Thrace in northern Greece, on the border with Turkey

The Komotini events (Turkish: Gümülcine olayları) occurred on 29 January 1990 between local Greek Christians and members of the Turkish Muslim minority in the Komotini area in northern Greece. The riots started over the conviction and imprisonment of an ethnic Turkish MP, Sadik Achmet, by a Greek court. 400 shops were looted, and the offices of two Turkish newspapers ransacked by Greek mobs. The pogrom-like attacks perpetrated by the Greek mobs in which no Turkish was injured, began when an ethnic Greek customs officer allegedly fell into a coma and died after being wounded in the head by a Muslim farmer during a heated argument about the trial of the Turkish MP.

== Background ==
A minority, which is recognized by the Council of Europe as part of the Muslim minority in Western Thrace, with estimates varying from 50,000 (official census) to as high as 130,000 (Human Rights Watch). The term 'Turkish minority' is officially denied by Greece via using "Muslim Greeks" instead. Discrimination of the Turks has been criticized by the US and the European Parliament. On January 26, 1990, a Greek court jailed 2 Turkish leaders because they used the word "Turk" in their political organization. Turks in Greece cannot choose their religious leader (mufti).

== Events ==
The events started in Komotini, when 1,500 Greek citizens of Turkish origin [Turks in Greece] gathered near a mosque chanting "we are Turks" in protest of the 1982 Supreme Court ruling restricting the use of the word "Turkish". After the broadcast of an erroneous news item on a local radio station, organized Greek mobs damaged and looted around 400 shops of the Turkish minority as well as beating up some of the minority members including the acting mufti. The police did not intervene. After international reaction 12 Greeks were arrested for attacking Muslim premises.

According to an eye-witness reported by Helsinki Watch: Greek mobs consisted of approximately 40 to 50 people running wild, breaking windows, beating people and vandalizing cars; he saw a police car coming behind the mob, without making any effort to stop the Greek nationalists. Foreign observers stated Greek shops were not touched, indeed many of these shops displayed Greek flags in the windows, suggesting the riots were carefully orchestrated, and that the police did not interfere to stop the mobs.

== Aftermath ==
The event increased the tension between Greece and Turkey when the Turkish Consul in Komotini was declared "persona non grata" and expelled from the country for having referred to the minority as "our kinsmen" in a letter he wrote to Greek authorities demanding the indemnification of damaged shops. Turkey retaliated by expelling the Greek Consul in Istanbul.

When a group from Synaspismos (Coalition of the Left) led by Maria Damanaki a member of Greek parliament visited the destroyed shops of the city two days after the events, they were verbally attacked by some Greek nationalists. During their meeting with the local politicians at the town hall, an angry local mob gathered outside to protest, calling Damanaki a traitor. The group could not meet the minority representatives under such circumstances and had to abandon the town hall under police surveillance.

In 1991 when Turks protested the dismissal of their chosen Mufti by the Greek government the tension increased again, reportedly thirteen people were injured and the Mosque of Komotini was bombed by Greeks.

== See also ==
- Anti-Turkism
- Bulgarization of Turks in Bulgaria
- Provisional Government of Western Thrace
- Istanbul Pogrom
