= Muslim Greeks =

Muslim Greeks may refer to:

- Greek Muslims, Muslims of Greek ethnic origin
- Muslim minority of Greece

== See also ==
- Islam in Greece
