= Greek speaking Muslims =

- For the Muslims of Greek ethnic origin, see Greek Muslims
- For the multiethnic Muslim minority in Thrace in Greece, see Muslim minority (Greece)
