= Turkish Union of Xanthi =

- Formation: 1927
- Type: non-governmental organization
- Headquarters: Xanthi, Greece
- Location: Xanthi regional unit
- President: Ozan Ahmetoğlu
- Affiliations: Cultural Association of Turkish Women of the Region of Rodopi; Union of Turkish Youth of Komotini
- Website: http://www.iskeceturkbirligi.org/

The Turkish Union of Xanthi (Turkish: İskeçe Türk Birliği, Greek: Τουρκική Ένωση Ξάνθης, romanized: Tourkikí Énosi Xánthis) is one of the three most important organizations of the Turkish minority of Western Thrace. Founded in 1927, the organization was outlawed by Greek authorities in 1987 and 1999. In 2008, a decision of the European Court of Human Rights ordered the re-legalization of the association and convicted Greece of violating the freedom of association; however, the Greek authorities refused to re-legalize it. It has been accused of having relations with the Turkish Nationalist Movement Party and the far-right terrorist organization Grey Wolves.

== History ==
The organization was founded in 1927 as the House of the Turkish Youth in Xanthi. In 1936 it was renamed and registered as the Turkish Union of Xanthi, which is its current name. In November 1987, along with other Turkish organizations of western Thrace, the Turkish Union of Xanthi was banned because according to the court the word "Turkish" in their titles as a description for members of the Muslim minority of Greece endangered public order and it should be used only to refer to Turkish citizens. In response to the court's decision, large protests, held primarily by Pomaks, took place in Komotini. The organization appealed this decision to the Supreme Court of Greece (Court of Cassation). In 2005, the Supreme Court of Greece ordered the dissolution of the association, which according to the court "constitutes an attempt to affirm the presence of a Turkish minority in Greece", although such rulings have been judged to be in breach of article 11 of the European Convention on Human Rights.

The Turkish Union of Xanthi then appealed the ruling to the European Court of Human Rights. On March 27, 2008, the court re-legalized the organization and other Turkish associations of the region. Additionally, the rulings of the Greek courts were judged to be violations of the European Convention on Human Rights. The Greek government appealed the decision and refused to recognize the Turkish Union of Xanthi; however, the European Court of Human Rights upheld its first ruling. In December 2008 the Appeals Court of Thrace, which ruled against the re-legalization of the association, stated that the ECHR decision was non-binding and that the court had neglected to consider "political" factors in its decision.

== See also ==
- Minorities in Greece
