= Demographics of Greece =

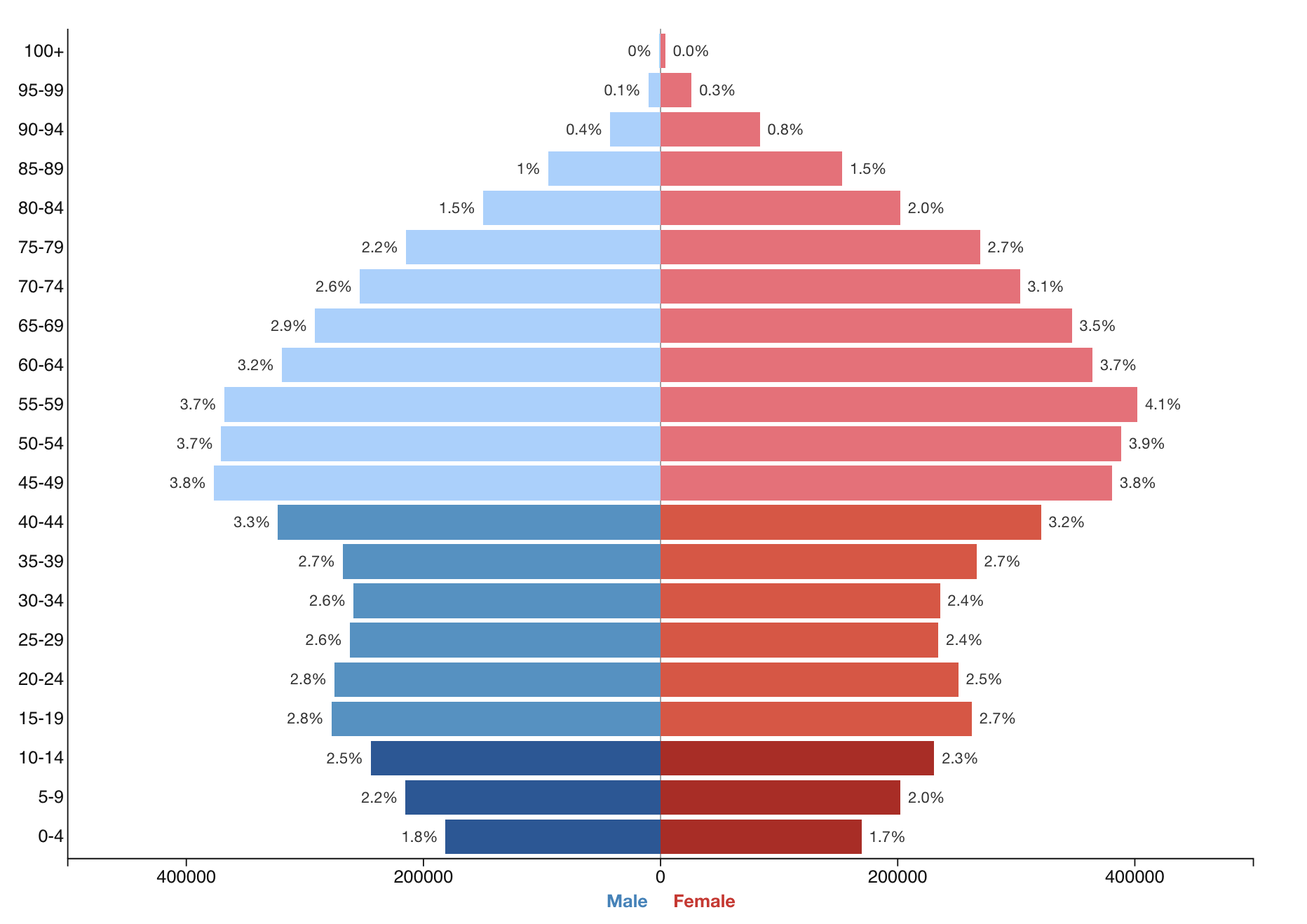
- Population pyramid of Greece in 2026
- Population: ▼10,372,335 (2025 est.)
- Density: ▼78.70/km^{2} (203.8/sq mi) (2024 est.)
- Growth rate: ▼ −0.47% (2025 est.)
- Birth rate: ▼6.6 births/1,000 population (2025 est.)
- Death rate: ▼11 deaths/1,000 population (2025 est.)
- Life expectancy: ▲81.9 years (2024 est.)
  - male: ▲79.4 years
  - female: ▲84.6 years
- Fertility rate: ▼1.19 children born/woman (2025 est.)
- Infant mortality: ▲3.8 deaths/1,000 live births (2024 est.)
- Net migration rate: ▲1.1 migrant(s)/1,000 population (2024 est.)
- Immigrant share: 14.2% (2024)

Age structure
- 0–14 years: ▼12.9% (2025 est.)
- 15–64 years: ▼62.7% (2025 est.)
- 65 and over: ▲24.4% (2025 est.)

Sex ratio
- Total: 0.96 male(s)/female (2024 est.)
- At birth: 1.07 male(s)/female
- Under 15: 1.06 male(s)/female
- 15–64 years: 1 male(s)/female
- 65 and over: 0.8 male(s)/female

Nationality
- Nationality: Greek
- Major ethnic: Greeks (91.6%)
- Minor ethnic: Albanians (4.4%); Other groups (4.0%)

Language
- Official: Greek
- Spoken: Languages of Greece

The Demographics of Greece refer to the demography of the population that inhabits the country. The population of Greece was estimated by the Hellenic Statistical Authority to be 10,372,335 in 2025. The latest census in Greece was conducted in 2021.

== Historical overview ==
Greece was inhabited as early as the Paleolithic period. The Greek language ultimately dominated the peninsula and Greece's mosaic of small city-states became culturally similar. The population estimates on the Greeks during the 4th century BC, is approximately 3.5 million on the Greek peninsula and 4 to 6.5 million in the rest of the entire Mediterranean Basin, including all colonies such as those in Magna Graecia, Asia Minor and the shores of the Black Sea.

During the history of the Byzantine Empire, the Greek peninsula was occasionally invaded by the foreign peoples like Goths, Avars, Slavs, Normans, Franks and other Romance-speaking peoples who had betrayed the Crusades. The only group, however, that planned to establish permanent settlements in the region were the Slavs. They settled in isolated valleys of the Peloponnese and Thessaly, establishing segregated communities that were referred by the Byzantines as Sclaveni. Traces of Slavic culture in Greece are very rare and by the 9th century, the Sclaveni in Greece were largely assimilated. However, some Slavic communities managed to survive in rural Macedonia. At the same time a large Sephardi Jewish emigrant community from the Iberian Peninsula established itself in Thessaloniki, while there were population movements of Arvanites and "Vlachs" (Aromanians and Megleno-Romanians), who established communities in several parts of the Greek peninsula. The Byzantine Empire ultimately fell to Ottoman Turks in the 15th century and as a result Ottoman colonies were established in the Balkans, notably in Macedonia, the Peloponnese and Crete. Many Greeks either fled to other European nations or to geographically isolated areas (i.e. mountains and heavily forested territories) to escape foreign rule. For those reasons, the population decreased in the plains, while increasing on the mountains. The population transfers with Bulgaria and Turkey that took place in the early 20th century, added in total some two million Greeks to the demography of the Greek Kingdom.

During the next decades, the population of Greece continued to increase, except during a large part of 1940s due to World War II and subsequent events. After 1940s the population of Greece continued to grow, though on a decreased pace after 1960s, due to a gradual decrease in fertility and emigration to various countries, such as West Germany, Australia, United Kingdom and many others. The birth rate decreased significantly in 1980s, while in 1987 the Greek population surpassed 10 million. At this time Greece had started to see a positive migration rate, due to the return of Greek Civil War refugees and international immigration. During the 1990s the population increased by close to 1 million, as the collapse of the communist governments in Eastern Europe and the economic downturn resulted in a significant influx of Eastern European immigrants to Greece, especially from the Balkans, including many diaspora Greeks returning home. In the 2000s the population continued to increase reaching 11 million, thanks to an increased birth rate, a stable influx of migrants from other countries and the return of Greeks from United States, Germany, Australia and other countries. In the 2010s, in the wake of the Greek financial crisis, the population started to decrease and birthrates plummeted, while death rates increased due to an aging population. Many Greeks emigrated abroad, while more recently the population decrease has been largely stabilized due to foreign immigration.

== Population ==
Population of Greece since 1961.

Historical population
Year	Pop.	±% p.a.
−1500	1,500,000	—
−400	20,000,000	+0.24%
600	10,000,000	−0.07%
1600	700,000	−0.27%
1800	2,500,000	+0.64%
1928	6,204,684	+0.71%
1940	7,344,860	+1.42%
1951	7,632,801	+0.35%
1961	8,398,050	+0.96%
1971	8,831,036	+0.50%
1981	9,729,350	+0.97%
1991	10,258,364	+0.53%
2001	10,934,097	+0.64%
2011	10,816,286	−0.11%
2021	10,482,487	−0.31%
Source: Hellenic Statistical Authority

View source data.
View source data.

View source data.
View source data.

According to the 2001 census the population of Greece was 10,964,020. Eurostat estimations as of January 2008 gave the number of 11,214,992 inhabitants in the Greek peninsula. According to the official 2011 census, which used sophisticated methodology, the population of Greece was 10,816,286.

Census	Population	Change
1971	8,768,372	–
1981	9,739,589	11.1%
1991	10,259,900	5.3%
2001	10,964,020	6.9%
2011	10,816,286	−0.88%
2021	10,482,487	−3.1%

=== By region ===
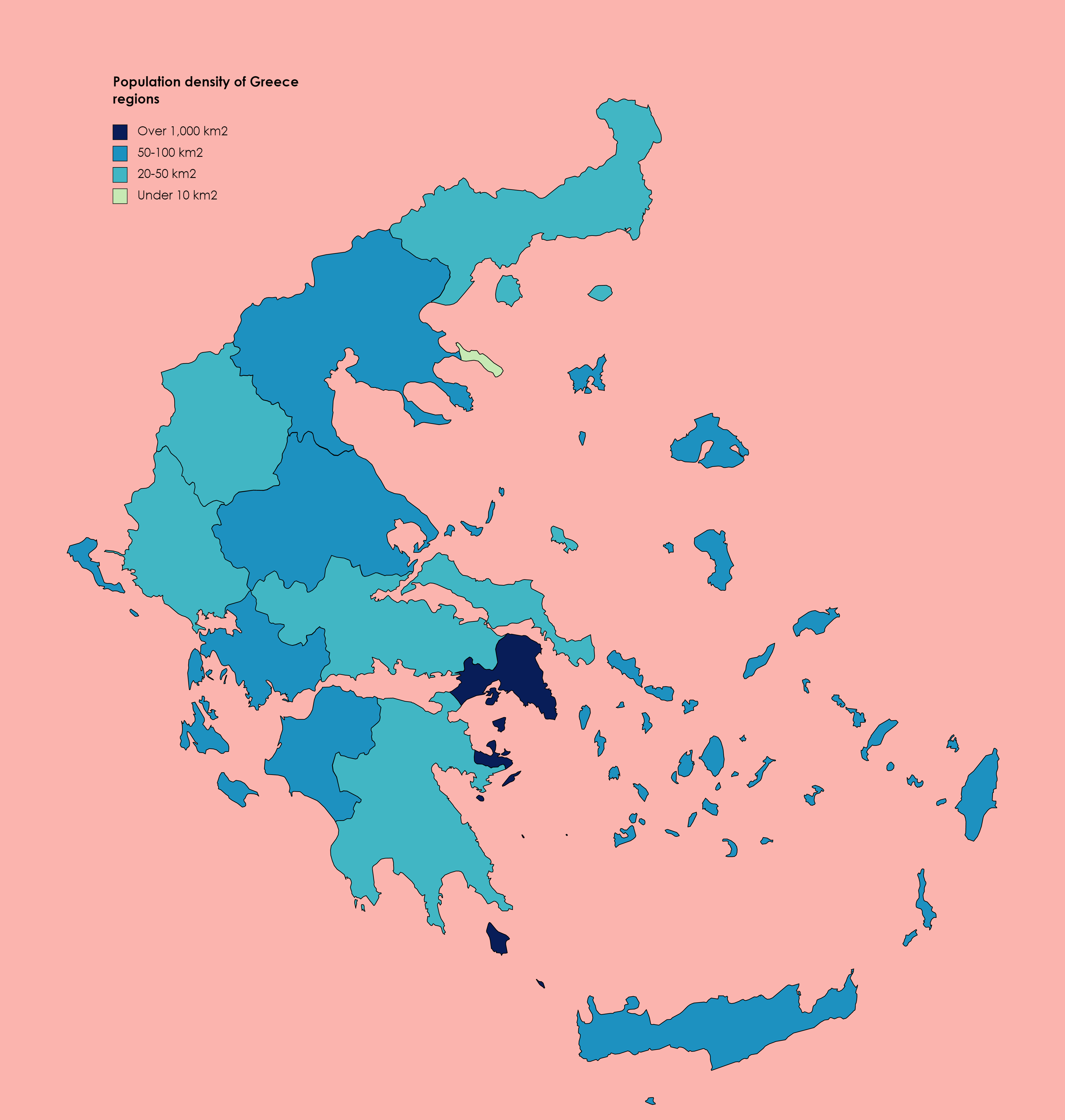
Population density map of Greek regions

Greece is divided into nine geographic regions. The population of each region according to the 1971, 1981, 1991, 2001, 2011 and 2021 censuses is represented in the table below, comparing the change in population over a 50-year period. The latest population estimates by the Hellenic Statistical Authority are also included.

Region	Population (1971)	Population (1981)	Population (1991)	Population (2001)	Population (2011)	Population (2021)	Population (2025)
Aegean Islands	417,813 ▼	428,030 ▲	456,555 ▲	508,807 ▲	508,246 ▼	522,763 ▲	534,963 ▲
Central Greece	3,532,248 ▲	4,125,463 ▲	4,366,900 ▲	4,591,568 ▲	4,586,626 ▼	4,514,663 ▼	4,455,160 ▼
Crete	456,642 ▼	501.909 ▲	536,433 ▲	601,131 ▲	623,065 ▲	624,408 ▲	621,121 ▼
Epirus	310,334 ▼	323.871 ▲	327,176 ▲	353,822 ▲	336,856 ▼	319,991 ▼	324,061 ▲
Ionian Islands	184,443 ▼	182.327 ▼	189,338 ▲	212,984 ▲	207,855 ▼	204,532 ▼	198,421 ▼
Macedonia	1,890,684 ▲	2,116,361 ▲	2,225,690 ▲	2,424,765 ▲	2,402,771 ▼	2,266,206 ▼	2,229,959 ▼
Peloponnese	986,912 ▼	1,014,485 ▲	1,045,020 ▲	1,155,019 ▲	1,046,897 ▼	995,410 ▼	981,399 ▼
Thessaly	659,913 ▼	695,724 ▲	729,268 ▲	753,888 ▲	732,762 ▼	688,255 ▼	676,040 ▼
Thrace	329,582 ▼	341,180 ▲	340,755 ▼	362,038 ▲	371,208 ▲	346,259 ▼	351,211 ▲
Total	8,768,372 ▲	9,729,350 ▲	10,223,392 ▲	10,964,020 ▲	10,816,286 ▼	10,482,487 ▼	10,372,335 ▼

▲/▼ = change since previous census

=== Fertility rate ===
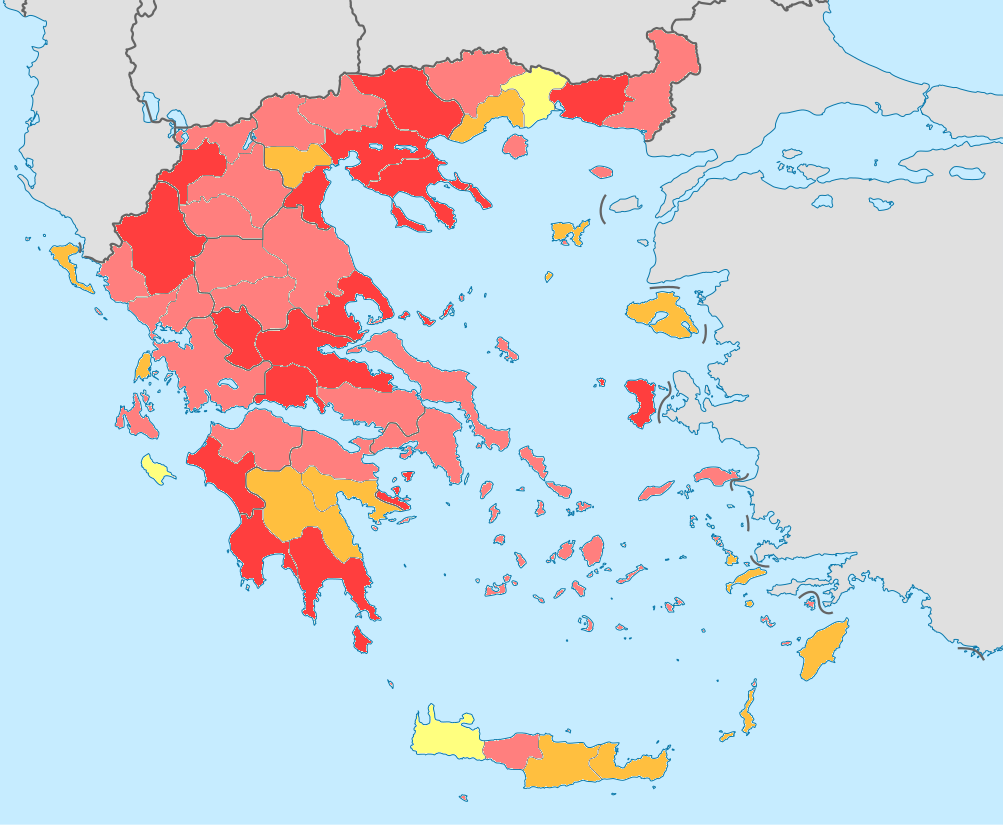
Greece total fertility rate by region (2014) 1.7 – 2.0 1.5 – 1.7 1.3 – 1.5 < 1.3

The total fertility rate is the number of children born per woman. It is based on fairly good data for the entire period. Sources: Our World In Data and Gapminder Foundation.

Years	1850	1851	1852	1853	1854	1855	1856	1857	1858	1859	1860
Total fertility rate in Greece	6.03	5.81	5.59	5.36	5.14	4.92	4.7	4.47	4.25	4.03	3.81

Years	1861	1862	1863	1864	1865	1866	1867	1868	1869	1870
Total fertility rate in Greece	3.95	3.87	3.78	3.94	3.73	4.03	3.83	3.85	3.86	3.77

Years	1871	1872	1873	1874	1875	1876	1877	1878	1879	1880
Total fertility rate in Greece	3.81	3.83	3.7	3.91	3.78	3.97	3.82	3.64	3.32	3.27

Years	1881	1882	1883	1884	1885	1886	1887	1888	1889	1890
Total fertility rate in Greece	3.28	3.38	3.35	3.83	3.82	4.01	4.19	4.38	4.57	4.73

Years	1891	1892	1893	1894	1895	1896	1897	1898	1899	1900
Total fertility rate in Greece	4.8	4.88	4.95	5.03	5.1	5.18	5.25	5.32	5.4	5.47

Years	1901	1902	1903	1904	1905	1906	1907	1908	1909	1910
Total fertility rate in Greece	5.35	5.22	5.1	4.97	4.85	4.72	4.6	4.47	4.35	4.22

Years	1911	1912	1913	1914	1915	1916	1917	1918	1919	1920
Total fertility rate in Greece	4.09	3.97	3.84	3.72	3.59	3.47	3.34	3.22	3.09	2.97

=== Life expectancy ===
Life expectancy in Greece since 1877

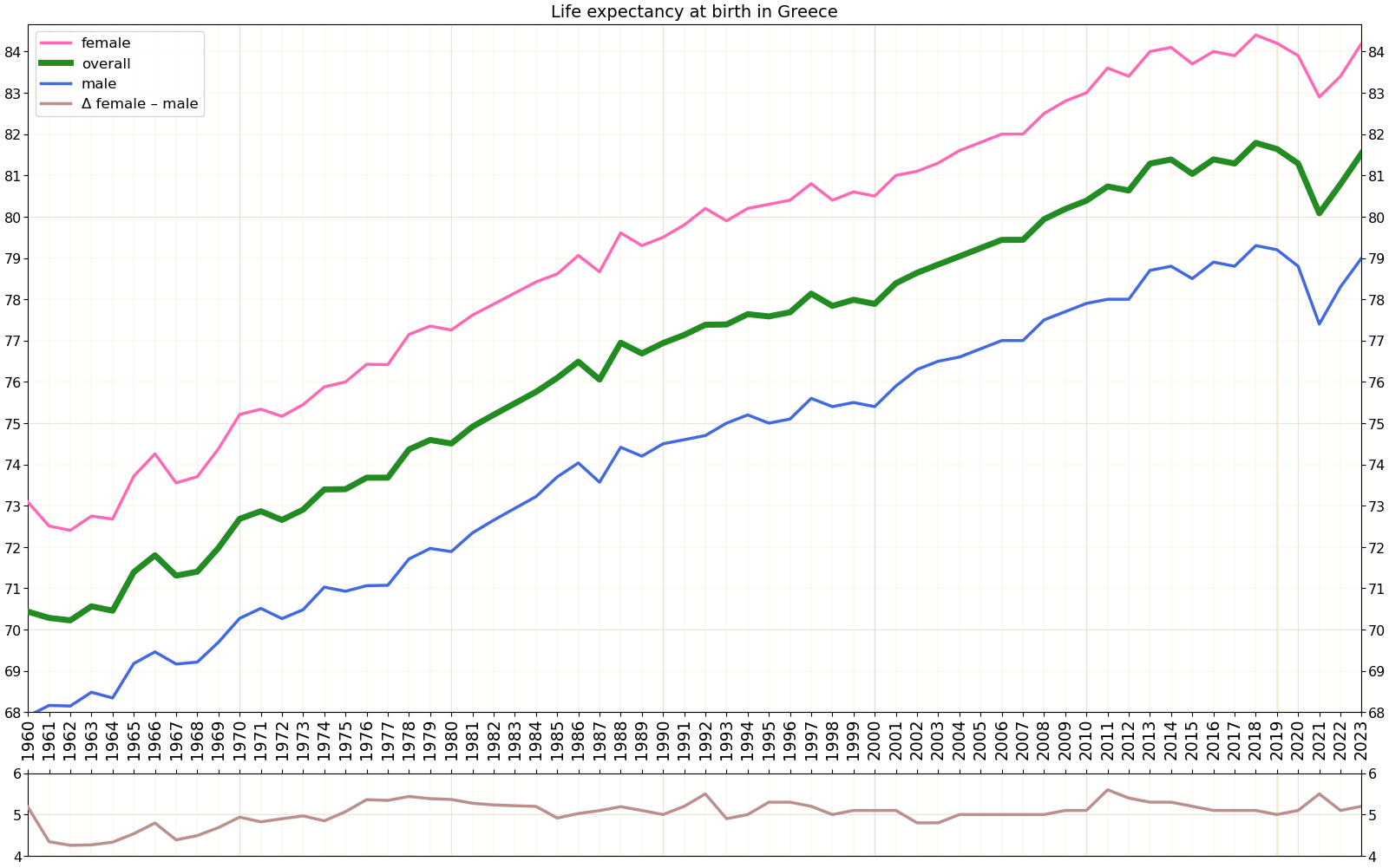
Life expectancy in Greece since 1960 by gender

Period	Life expectancy in Years	Period	Life expectancy in Years
1950–1955	65.8	1985–1990	75.6
1955–1960	67.2	1990–1995	77.4
1960–1965	69.3	1995–2000	78.1
1965–1970	70.1	2000–2005	79.1
1970–1975	71.8	2005–2010	80.0
1975–1980	72.8	2010–2015	80.6
1980–1985	74.5	2015–2020	81.2

Source: UN World Population Prospects

=== Age structure ===
Being part of the phenomenon of the aging of Europe, the Greek population shows a rapid increase of the percentage of the elderly people. Greece's population census of 1961 found that 10.9% of the total population was above the age of 65, while the percentage of this group age increased to 19.0% in 2011. In contrast, the percentage of the population of the ages 0–14 had a total decrease of 10.2% between 1961 and 2011.

Age group	1971		1981		1991		2001		2011		2021	
Age group	Population	%	Population	%	Population	%	Population	%	Population	%	Population	%
0–14	2,223,904	25.4	2,307,297	23.7	1,974,867	19.2	1,664,085	15.2	1,576,500	14.4	1,510,736	14.1
15–64	5,587,352	63.7	6,192,751	63.6	6,880,681	67.1	7,468,395	68.1	7,122,830	66.6	6,760,040	63.3
65+	957,116	10.9	1,239,541	12.7	1,404,352	13.7	1,831,540	16.7	2,108,807	19.0	2,407,856	22.6
Total	8,768,372		9,739,589		10,259,900		10,964,020		10,816,286		10,678,632	

== Vital statistics ==
=== Vital statistics from 1833 ===
Source: Hellenic Statistical Authority Territorial changes of Greece occurred in 1881 (the addition of Thessaly), 1913 (the addition of Macedonia, Epirus, and the Aegean islands) and in 1923–1925 (Population exchange between Greece and Turkey)

Notable events in Greek demography:

- 1881 – Convention of Constantinople
- 1913 – Treaty of Athens
- 1918 – Spanish flu
- 1923 – Treaty of Lausanne
- 1940–1945 World War II
- 1946–1949 – Refugees of the Greek Civil War
- 1967–1974 – Greek junta
- 1981 – Greece joins the European Communities
- 2001 – Greece enters the Euro-zone
- 2009–2019 – Greek economic crisis
- 2020–2022 – COVID-19 pandemic

	Average population (Note: January 1, 2001 onwards)	Live births	Deaths	Natural change	Crude birth rate (per 1000)	Crude death rate (per 1000)	Natural change (per 1000)	Crude migration change (per 1000)	Total Fertility Rates (Note: In fertility rates, 2.1 and above is a stable population and has been marked blue, 2 and below leads to an aging population and the result is that the population decreases.)
1833	753,000	28,300	20,900	7,400	37.6	27.8	9.8		
1834	765,000	28,800	21,300	7,500	37.7	27.8	9.9	5.93	
1835	777,000	29,300	21,700	7,600	37.7	27.9	9.8	5.71	
1836	789,000	29,800	22,000	7,800	37.8	27.9	9.9	5.36	
1837	801,000	30,300	22,400	7,900	37.8	28.0	9.8	5.16	
1838	813,000	30,800	22,800	8,000	37.9	28.0	9.8	4.96	
1839	825,000	31,400	23,200	8,200	38.1	28.1	10.0	4.88	
1840	838,000	32,000	23,600	8,400	38.2	28.2	10.0	4.09	
1841	858,000	32,700	24,100	8,600	38.1	28.1	10.0	12.97	
1842	878,000	33,500	24,600	8,900	38.1	28.0	10.1	12.79	
1843	899,000	34,300	25,100	9,200	38.1	27.9	10.2	13.51	
1844	920,000	35,100	25,600	9,500	38.2	27.8	10.4	13.52	
1845	941,000	36,000	26,100	9,900	38.2	27.7	10.5	12.04	
1846	963,000	36,800	26,700	10,100	38.2	27.7	10.5	12.39	
1847	985,000	37,700	27,200	10,500	38.3	27.6	10.7	11.70	
1848	1,008,000	38,600	27,800	10,800	38.3	27.6	10.7	11.84	
1849	1,021,000	39,100	28,200	10,900	38.3	27.6	10.7	2.66	
1850	1,031,000	36,200	25,400	10,800	35.1	24.6	10.5	−0.78	6.03
1851	1,046,000	36,700	25,900	10,800	35.1	24.8	10.3	3.56	5.81
1852	1,061,000	37,300	26,300	11,000	35.2	24.8	10.4	3.99	5.59
1853	1,076,000	37,800	26,800	11,000	35.1	24.9	10.2	3.74	5.36
1854	1,092,000	38,400	27,300	11,100	35.2	25.0	10.2	4.61	5.14
1855	1,108,000	39,000	27,800	11,200	35.2	25.1	10.1	4.55	4.92
1856	1,124,000	39,500	28,200	11,300	35.1	25.1	10.0	4.48	4.70
1857	1,140,000	40,100	28,700	11,400	35.2	25.2	10.0	4.42	4.47
1858	1,156,000	40,700	29,200	11,500	35.2	25.3	9.9	4.44	4.25
1859	1,173,000	41,300	29,700	11,600	35.2	25.3	9.9	4.64	4.03
1860	1,190,000	41,900	30,200	11,700	35.2	25.4	9.8	4.49	3.71
1861	1,264,000	44,200	31,800	12,400	35.0	25.2	9.8	50.20	3.95
1862	1,286,000	45,000	32,300	12,700	35.0	25.1	9.9	7.29	3.87
1863	1,308,000	45,900	32,800	13,100	35.1	25.1	10.0	6.86	3.78
1864	1,330,000	46,700	33,200	13,500	35.1	25.0	10.1	6.4	3.94
1865	1,353,000	47,600	33,700	13,900	35.2	24.9	10.3	6.8	3.73
1866	1,376,000	48,400	34,200	14,200	35.2	24.9	10.3	6.5	4.03
1867	1,400,000	49,300	34,800	14,500	35.2	24.9	10.4	6.8	3.83
1868	1,424,000	50,200	35,300	14,900	35.2	24.8	10.4	6.4	3.85
1869	1,448,000	51,100	35,900	15,200	35.3	24.8	10.5	6.3	3.86
1870	1,457,000	50,200	33,600	16,600	34.5	23.1	11.4	-0.5	3.77
1871	1,474,000	50,900	34,200	16,700	34.5	23.2	11.3	2.3	3.81
1872	1,491,000	51,700	34,800	16,900	34.7	23.3	11.4	2.7	3.83
1873	1,508,000	52,400	35,200	17,200	34.8	23.3	11.5	2.6	3.70
1874	1,526,000	53,100	35,800	17,300	34.8	23.5	11.3	2.0	3.91
1875	1,544,000	53,800	36,400	17,400	34.8	23.6	11.3	2.0	3.78
1876	1,563,000	54,600	36,900	17,700	34.9	23.6	11.3	1.9	3.97
1877	1,582,000	55,400	37,400	18,000	35.0	23.6	11.4	2.4	3.82
1878	1,602,000	56,200	38,000	18,200	35.1	23.7	11.4	2.4	3.64
1879	1,622,000	57,000	38,600	18,400	35.1	23.8	11.3	2.6	3.32
1880	1,643,000	57,900	39,100	18,800	35.3	23.8	11.4	28.2	3.27
1881	1,709,000	60,300	41,000	19,300	35.3	24.0	11.3	3.0	3.28
1882	1,734,000	61,300	41,700	19,600	35.4	24.1	11.3	3.7	3.38
1883	1,760,000	62,200	42,400	19,800	35.4	24.1	11.3	3.5	3.35
1884	1,786,000	63,000	43,000	20,000	35.3	24.1	11.2	3.5	3.83
1885	1,812,000	63,800	43,500	20,300	35.2	24.0	11.2	3.6	3.82
1886	1,839,000	64,700	44,000	20,700	35.2	23.9	11.3	3.5	4.01
1887	1,867,000	65,700	44,700	21,000	35.2	23.9	11.3	3.5	4.19
1888	1,895,000	66,700	45,300	21,400	35.2	23.9	11.3	3.5	4.38
1889	1,924,000	67,700	45,900	21,800	35.2	23.9	11.3	3.6	4.57
1890	1,953,000	68,700	46,600	22,100	35.2	23.9	11.3	3.7	4.73
1891	1,991,000	70,000	47,400	22,600	35.2	23.8	11.4	8.1	4.80
1892	2,030,000	71,300	48,200	23,100	35.1	23.8	11.4	7.6	4.88
1893	2,070,000	72,600	49,000	23,600	35.1	23.7	11.4	8.2	4.95
1894	2,110,000	73,900	49,800	24,100	35.0	23.6	11.4	7.8	5.03
1895	2,151,000	75,300	50,500	24,800	35.0	23.5	11.5	7.9	5.10
1896	2,193,000	76,700	51,200	25,500	35.0	23.4	11.6	7.6	5.18
1897	2,236,000	78,200	52,000	26,200	35.0	23.3	11.7	7.6	5.25
1898	2,280,000	79,700	52,800	26,900	34.9	23.2	11.7	7.6	5.32
1899	2,324,000	81,200	53,600	27,600	34.9	23.1	11.9	7.1	5.40
1900	2,433,000	84,900	58,200	26,700	34.9	23.9	11.0	34.6	5.47
1901	2,455,000	85,600	58,900	26,700	34.9	24.0	10.9	−1.9	5.35
1902	2,478,000	86,400	59,400	27,000	34.9	24.0	10.9	1.6	5.22
1903	2,501,000	87,300	60,200	27,100	34.9	24.1	10.8	-1.7	5.10
1904	2,525,000	88,000	60,800	27,200	34.8	24.1	10.7	−1.3	4.97
1905	2,549,000	88,700	61,300	27,400	34.8	24.0	10.8	−1.3	4.85
1906	2,573,000	89,300	61,700	27,600	34.7	24.0	10.7	−1.4	4.72
1907	2,598,000	90,100	62,300	27,800	34.7	24.0	10.7	−1.1	4.60
1908	2,623,000	90,900	63,000	27,900	34.7	24.0	10.6	−1.1	4.47
1909	2,648,000	91,700	63,500	28,200	34.6	24.0	10.6	−1.2	4.35
1910	2,674,000	92,500	64,100	28,400	34.6	24.0	10.6	−0.9	4.22
1911	2,728,000	94,300	65,400	28,900	34.5	24.0	10.5	9.3	4.09
1912	2,761,000	95,200	66,200	29,000	34.5	24.0	10.5	1.5	3.97
1913	4,718,000	167,500	114,300	53,200	35.5	24.2	11.3	509.11	3.84
1914	4,755,000	167,000	116,000	51,000	35.1	24.4	10.7	−3.0	3.72
1915	4,792,000	166,500	118,300	48,200	34.7	24.7	10.0	−2.4	3.59
1916	4,830,000	165,900	120,700	45,200	34.3	25.0	9.3	−1.5	3.47
1917	4,869,000	165,200	123,000	42,200	33.9	25.3	8.6	−0.7	3.34
1918	4,908,000	164,600	148,500	16,100	33.5	30.3	3.3	4.7	3.22
1919	4,948,000	165,300	126,900	38,400	33.4	25.6	7.8	0.3	3.09
1920	4,989,000	166,000	125,500	40,500	33.3	25.1	8.1	0.1	2.97
1921	5,030,000	162,800	117,400	45,400	32.4	23.3	9.0	−0.9	2.84
1922	5,090,000	163,500	120,900	42,600	32.1	23.8	8.4	3.4	2.88
1923	5,150,000	164,900	124,600	40,300	32.0	24.2	7.8	3.9	2.55
1924	5,210,000	165,800	126,500	39,300	31.8	24.3	7.5	4.0	2.61
1925	5,958,000	156,367	88,633	67,734	26.2	14.9	11.4	121.82	3.52
1926	6,042,000	181,278	84,136	97,142	30.0	13.9	16.1	−2.0	4.02
1927	6,127,000	176,527	100,020	76,507	28.8	16.3	12.5	1.0	3.86
1928	6,210,000	189,250	105,665	83,585	30.5	17.0	13.5	−1.3	4.09
1929	6,286,000	181,870	115,561	66,309	28.9	18.4	10.5	2.4	3.87
1930	6,367,000	199,565	103,811	95,754	31.3	16.3	15.0	0.1	4.19
1931	6,463,000	199,243	114,369	84,874	30.8	17.7	13.1	−0.6	3.83
1932	6,544,000	185,523	117,593	67,930	28.4	18.0	10.4	2.0	3.8
1933	6,625,000	189,583	111,447	78,136	28.6	16.8	11.8	3.6	3.84
1934	6,727,000	208,929	100,651	108,278	31.1	15.0	16.1	0.3	4.16
1935	6,837,000	192,511	101,416	91,095	28.2	14.8	13.3	1.2	3.77
1936	6,936,000	193,343	105,005	88,338	27.9	15.1	12.7	0.7	3.68
1937	7,029,000	183,878	105,674	78,204	26.2	15.0	11.1	2.1	3.51
1938	7,122,000	184,509	93,766	90,743	25.9	13.2	12.7	1.3	3.47
1939	7,222,000	178,852	100,459	78,393	24.8	13.9	10.9	2.5	3.32
1940	7,319,000	179,500	93,830	85,670	24.5	12.8	11.7	−4.7	3.29
1941	7,370,000	134,760	125,710	9,050	18.3	17.1	1.2	−3.9	3.19
1942	7,350,000	132,640	191,030	−58,390	18.0	26.0	−7.9	−1.6	3.08
1943	7,280,000	122,170	111,320	10,850	16.8	15.3	1.5	1.2	2.98
1944	7,300,000	145,530	110,810	34,720	19.9	15.2	4.8	−3.4	2.88
1945	7,310,000	183,470	85,540	97,930	25.1	11.7	13.4	3.0	2.78
1946	7,430,000	209,360	73,500	135,860	28.2	9.9	18.3	−6.2	2.68
1947	7,520,000	206,400	70,340	136,060	27.4	9.4	18.1	−20.8	2.58
1948	7,500,000	210,000	96,000	114,000	28.0	12.8	15.2	−17.8	2.48
1949	7,480,000	139,108	59,450	79,658	18.6	7.9	10.6	−0.7	2.37
1950	7,554,000	151,314	53,755	97,559	20.0	7.1	12.9	−0.7	2.57
1951	7,646,000	155,422	57,508	97,914	20.3	7.5	12.8	−1.4	2.47
1952	7,733,000	149,637	53,377	96,260	19.4	6.9	12.4	−1.5	2.48
1953	7,817,000	143,765	56,680	87,085	18.4	7.3	11.1	−1.4	2.49
1954	7,893,000	151,892	55,625	96,267	19.2	7.0	12.2	−3.0	2.48
1955	7,966,000	154,263	54,781	99,482	19.4	6.9	12.5	−4.3	2.39
1956	8,031,000	158,203	59,460	96,727	19.4	7.4	12.0	−3.9	2.44
1957	8,096,000	155,940	61,664	93,528	19.2	7.6	11.6	−2.1	2.42
1958	8,173,000	155,359	58,160	97,199	19.0	7.1	11.9	−1.5	2.38
1959	8,258,000	160,199	60,852	99,347	19.4	7.4	12.0	−2.8	2.36
1960	8,304,698	157,239	60,563	96,676	18.9	7.3	11.6	−3.9	2.23
1961	8,363,490	150,716	63,955	86,761	17.9	7.6	10.3	−4.3	2.32
1962	8,433,124	152,158	66,554	85,604	18.0	7.9	10.1	−6.3	2.32
1963	8,463,290	148,249	66,813	81,436	17.5	7.9	9.6	−6.1	2.34
1964	8,495,610	153,109	69,429	83,680	18.0	8.1	9.8	−5.0	2.37
1965	8,525,408	151,448	67,269	84,179	17.7	7.8	9.8	−2.4	2.32
1966	8,575,653	154,613	67,912	86,701	17.9	7.9	10.1	−1.7	2.46
1967	8,651,739	162,839	71,975	90,864	18.7	8.3	10.5	−4.2	2.51
1968	8,716,502	160,338	73,309	87,029	18.3	8.4	10.0	−6.3	2.54
1969	8,765,894	154,077	71,825	82,252	17.6	8.2	9.4	−7.1	2.56
1970	8,780,549	144,928	74,009	70,919	16.5	8.4	8.1	−3.8	2.43
1971	8,805,194	141,126	73,819	67,307	16.0	8.4	7.6	−1.0	2.57
1972	8,857,439	140,891	76,859	64,032	15.9	8.6	7.2	−2.7	2.55
1973	8,920,359	137,526	77,648	59,878	15.4	8.7	6.7	−3.0	2.54
1974	8,937,982	144,069	76,303	67,766	16.1	8.5	7.6	1.9	2.52
1975	8,986,203	142,273	80,077	62,196	15.7	8.9	6.9	6.4	2.33
1976	9,106,985	146,566	81,818	64,748	16.0	8.9	7.1	4.0	2.35
1977	9,269,459	143,739	83,750	59,989	15.4	9.0	6.5	7.1	2.28
1978	9,347,618	146,588	81,615	64,973	15.5	8.7	6.9	7.9	2.29
1979	9,512,347	147,965	82,338	65,627	15.5	8.6	6.9	4.5	2.26
1980	9,584,298	148,134	87,282	60,852	15.4	9.1	6.3	2.6	2.23
1981	9,700,893	140,953	86,261	54,692	14.5	8.9	5.6	0.7	2.10
1982	9,757,944	137,275	86,345	50,930	14.0	8.8	5.2	0.6	2.03
1983	9,821,279	132,608	90,586	42,022	13.5	9.2	4.3	0.7	1.94
1984	9,872,195	125,724	88,397	37,327	12.7	8.9	3.8	0	1.82
1985	9,919,539	116,481	92,886	23,595	11.7	9.4	2.4	0.9	1.68
1986	9,949,185	112,810	91,469	20,781	11.3	9.2	2.1	1.3	1.60
1987	9,985,374	106,392	95,232	10,667	10.6	9.5	1.1	2.5	1.50
1988	10,015,957	107,505	93,031	14,637	10.7	9.3	1.4	3.9	1.50
1989	10,058,127	101,657	92,717	8,432	10.0	9.2	0.9	6.1	1.40
1990	10,120,984	102,229	94,152	8,077	10.1	9.3	0.8	8.6	1.39
1991	10,272,768	102,620	95,498	7,122	10.0	9.3	0.7	10.3	1.37
1992	10,367,276	104,081	98,231	5,850	10.0	9.5	0.6	8.7	1.36
1993	10,431,200	101,799	97,419	4,380	9.7	9.3	0.4	7.9	1.32
1994	10,489,958	103,763	97,807	5,956	9.8	9.3	0.6	7.2	1.33
1995	10,536,004	101,495	100,158	1,337	9.5	9.4	0.1	7.0	1.28
1996	10,588,378	100,718	100,740	−22	9.4	9.4	−0.0	6.3	1.26
1997	10,629,378	102,038	99,738	2,300	9.5	9.3	0.2	5.2	1.27
1998	10,693,340	100,894	102,668	−1,774	9.3	9.5	−0.2	4.6	1.24
1999	10,747,879	100,643	103,304	−2,661	9.2	9.5	−0.3	3.5	1.23
2000	10,775,693	103,274	105,219	−1,952	9.5	9.6	−0.1	−7.4	1.25
2001	10,836,578	102,282	102,559	−277	9.4	9.4	0.0	4.8	1.25
2002	10,888,357	103,569	103,915	−346	9.5	9.5	0.0	2.5	1.28
2003	10,915,874	104,420	105,529	−1,109	9.6	9.7	−0.1	2.4	1.29
2004	10,940,437	105,655	104,942	713	9.6	9.6	0.1	2.6	1.31
2005	10,969,984	107,545	105,091	2,454	9.8	9.6	0.2	3.0	1.34
2006	11,004,784	112,042	105,476	6,566	10.2	9.6	0.6	2.2	1.40
2007	11,036,789	111,926	109,895	2,031	10.1	9.9	0.2	2.1	1.41
2008	11,060,985	118,302	107,979	10,323	10.7	9.7	0.9	2.2	1.50
2009	11,094,768	117,933	108,316	9,617	10.6	9.8	0.9	1.3	1.50
2010	11,119,102	114,766	109,084	5,682	10.3	9.8	0.5	−0.1	1.50
2011	11,123,392	106,428	111,099	−4,671	9.6	10.0	−0.4	−2.9	1.41
2012	11,072,725	100,371	116,668	−16,297	9.1	10.6	−1.5	−6.0	1.36
2013	10,980,006	94,134	111,794	−17,660	8.6	10.2	−1.6	−5.4	1.30
2014	10,894,294	92,149	113,740	−21,591	8.5	10.4	−2.0	4.3	1.31
2015	10,818,041	91,847	121,183	−29,336	8.5	11.2	−2.7	−4.2	1.34
2016	10,735,415	92,898	118,788	−25,890	8.6	11.0	−2.4	1.0	1.39
2017	10,707,527	88,553	124,495	−35,942	8.2	11.6	−3.3	0.8	1.36
2018	10,667,336	86,440	120,291	−33,851	8.1	11.2	−3.2	1.8	1.36
2019	10,635,213	83,756	124,954	−41,198	7.8	11.7	−3.8	3.1	1.35
2020	10,612,591	84,764	131,025	−46,261	7.9	12.3	−4.3	−0.7	1.41
2021	10,555,334	85,346	143,904	−58,558	8.2	13.8	−5.6	−1.4	1.45
2022	10,461,627	76,095	140,792	−64,697	7.2	13.2	−6.0	−10.7	1.33
2023	10,401,868	71,455	128,101	−56,646	6.9	12.4	−5.5	2.5	1.28
2024	10,375,764	68,467	126,164	−57,698	6.6	12.2	−5.6	5.2	1.26
2025	10,372,335	65,594	121,566	–55,972	6.4	11.9	–5.5		1.23

=== Current vital statistics ===
Period	Live births	Deaths	Natural increase
January–October 2025	55,644	102,837	−47,193
January–October 2026	54,855	102,834	−47,979
Difference	▼ –789 (–1.42%)	▼ –3 (–0%)	▼ –786

View source data.

=== Total fertility rates (TFR) ===
==== Total fertility rates (TFR) by region ====
2013-2024
Regions	2013	2014	2015	2016	2017	2018	2019	2020	2021	2022	2023	2024
South Aegean	1.31	1.39 ▲	1.38 ▼	1.54 ▲	1.52 ▼	1.54 ▲	1.62 ▲	1.64 ▲	1.72 ▲	1.63 ▼	1.58 ▼	1.69 ▲
Crete	1.42	1.44 ▲	1.47 ▲	1.55 ▲	1.49 ▼	1.52 ▲	1.54 ▲	1.56 ▲	1.73 ▲	1.62 ▼	1.57 ▼	1.51 ▼
Ionian Islands	1.42	1.43 ▲	1.45 ▲	1.49 ▲	1.50 ▲	1.60 ▲	1.55 ▼	1.59 ▲	1.63 ▲	1.45 ▼	1.31 ▼	1.50 ▲
North Aegean	1.36	1.40 ▲	1.44 ▲	1.55 ▲	1.55 –	1.63 ▲	1.60 ▼	1.98 ▲	1.55 ▼	1.32 ▼	1.46 ▲	1.43 ▼
Peloponnisos	1.31	1.33 ▲	1.32 ▼	1.37 ▲	1.35 ▼	1.35 –	1.32 ▼	1.38 ▲	1.47 ▲	1.43 ▼	1.38 ▼	1.37 ▼
Western Greece	1.33	1.31 ▼	1.33 ▲	1.36 ▲	1.32 ▼	1.29 ▼	1.32 ▲	1.35 ▲	1.42 ▲	1.42 ▲	1.34 ▼	1.31 ▼
Thessaly	1.34	1.32 ▼	1.35 ▲	1.35 –	1.33 ▼	1.32 ▼	1.28 ▼	1.32 ▲	1.41 ▲	1.36 ▼	1.33 ▼	1.29 ▼
Eastern Macedonia and Thrace	1.38	1.35 ▼	1.40 ▲	1.41 ▲	1.42 ▲	1.32 ▼	1.30 ▼	1.34 ▲	1.44 ▲	1.35 ▼	1.29 ▼	1.29 ▼
Greece	1.29	1.30 ▲	1.33 ▲	1.38 ▲	1.35 ▼	1.35 –	1.34 ▼	1.39 ▲	1.43 ▲	1.32 ▼	1.26 ▼	1.24 ▼
Central Greece	1.25	1.24 ▼	1.23 ▼	1.30 ▲	1.24 ▼	1.23 ▼	1.12 ▼	1.24 ▲	1.34 ▲	1.37 ▲	1.24 ▼	1.22 ▼
Central Macedonia	1.30	1.27 ▼	1.31 ▲	1.36 ▲	1.34 ▼	1.28 ▼	1.27 ▼	1.30 ▲	1.34 ▲	1.25 ▼	1.18 ▼	1.19 ▲
Epirus	1.29	1.26 ▼	1.28 ▲	1.30 ▲	1.26 ▼	1.22 ▼	1.24 ▲	1.25 ▲	1.34 ▲	1.28 ▼	1.18 ▼	1.18 ▼
Western Macedonia	1.29	1.33 ▲	1.32 ▼	1.31 ▼	1.34 ▲	1.26 ▼	1.26 –	1.33 ▲	1.31 ▼	1.19 ▼	1.23 ▲	1.17 ▼
Attica	1.23	1.26 ▲	1.30 ▲	1.36 ▲	1.34 ▼	1.36 ▲	1.35 ▼	1.39 ▲	1.40 ▲	1.23 ▼	1.18 ▼	1.14 ▼

==== Total fertility rates (TFR) by regional unit ====
2024
Regional units	TFR
North Athens	1.19
West Athens	1.19
Central Athens	0.92
South Athens	1.09
East Attica	1.36
West Attica	1.70
Piraeus, Islands	1.13
Lesbos, Lemnos	1.36
Ikaria, Samos	1.39
Chios	1.55
Kalymnos, Karpathos-Kasos, Kos, Rhodes	1.55
Andros, Thira, Kea-Kythnos, Milos, Mykonos, Naxos, Paros, Syros, Tinos	1.95
Heraklion	1.50
Lasithi	1.34
Rethymno	1.61
Chania	1.54
Evros	1.33
Xanthi	1.36
Rhodope	1.13
Drama	1.22
Thasos, Kavala	1.36
Imathia	1.35
Thessaloniki	1.12
Kilkis	1.32
Pella	1.41
Pieria	1.33
Serres	1.12
Chalkidiki	1.40
Grevena, Kozani	1.17
Kastoria	1.22
Florina	1.05
Arta, Preveza	1.28
Thesprotia	1.31
Ioannina	1.09
Karditsa, Trikala	1.21
Larissa	1.37
Magnesia, Sporades	1.23
Zakynthos	1.71
Corfu	1.48
Ithaca, Cephalonia	1.34
Lefkada	1.39
Aetolia-Acarnania	1.43
Achaea	1.30
Elis	1.22
Boeotia	1.30
Euboea	1.24
Evrytania	0.82
Phthiotis	1.25
Phocis	0.89
Argolis, Arcadia	1.29
Corinthia	1.40
Laconia, Messenia	1.39
Greece	1.24

=== Structure of the population ===
Population by Sex and Age Group (Census 09.V.2011):

Age group	Male	Female	Total	%
Total	5 303 223	5 513 063	10 816 286	100
0–4	274 788	262 455	537 243	4.97
5–9	262 432	250 164	512 596	4.74
10–14	265 787	253 642	519 429	4.80
15–19	286 386	266 890	553 276	5.12
20–24	325 127	301 970	627 097	5.80
25–29	371 617	352 154	723 771	6.69
30–34	417 861	404 614	822 475	7.60
35–39	409 681	403 148	812 829	7.51
40–44	414 026	418 640	832 666	7.70
45–49	367 086	381 343	748 429	6.92
50–54	355 552	375 934	731 486	6.76
55–59	321 466	338 902	660 368	6.11
60–64	301 589	324 180	625 769	5.79
65–69	241 832	266 444	508 276	4.70
70–74	246 264	295 901	542 165	5.01
75–79	209 983	265 094	475 077	4.39
80–84	146 455	205 918	352 373	3.26
85–89	60 933	98 908	159 841	1.48
90–94	18 760	34 685	53 445	0.49
95–99	4 948	10 239	15 187	0.14
100+	650	1 838	2 488	0.02
Age group	Male	Female	Total	Percent
0–14	803 007	766 261	1 569 268	14.51
15–64	3 570 391	3 567 775	7 138 166	65.99
65+	929 825	1 179 027	2 108 852	19.50

Population Estimates by Sex and Age Group (01.I.2021) (Data refer to usual resident population.):

Age group	Male	Female	Total	%
Total	5 196 048	5 482 584	10 678 632	100
0–4	232 962	221 004	453 966	4.25
5–9	256 724	242 916	499 640	4.68
10–14	286 211	270 919	557 130	5.22
15–19	286 473	261 827	548 300	5.13
20–24	295 675	267 375	563 050	5.27
25–29	289 021	268 852	557 873	5.22
30–34	292 391	293 623	586 014	5.49
35–39	351 172	348 759	699 931	6.55
40–44	397 038	400 046	797 084	7.46
45–49	388 226	404 647	792 873	7.42
50–54	388 838	418 213	807 051	7.56
55–59	340 585	379 684	720 269	6.74
60–64	320 930	366 665	687 595	6.44
65–69	288 274	327 034	615 308	5.76
70–74	261 202	309 037	570 239	5.34
75–79	200 470	246 135	446 605	4.18
80–84	161 684	227 332	389 016	3.64
85–89	98 597	148 795	247 392	2.32
90–94	41 160	58 052	99 212	0.93
95–99	12 188	14 445	26 633	0.25
100–104	4 334	4 190	8 524	0.08
105–109	1 370	2 047	3 417	0.03
110+	523	987	1 510	0.01
Age group	Male	Female	Total	Percent
0–14	775 897	734 839	1 510 736	14.15
15–64	3 350 349	3 409 691	6 760 040	63.30
65+	1 069 802	1 338 054	2 407 856	22.55

== Other demographic statistics ==
Population pyramid of Greece in 1928

Demographic statistics according to the CIA World Factbook, unless otherwise indicated.

Population pyramid of Greece in 2017

Population
10,413,982 (Jan 2023 est.)
10,718,565 (Jan 2020 est.)
10,761,523 (July 2018 est.)
10,768,477 (July 2017 est.)
10,768,193 (Jan 2017 est.)

Age structure
0–14 years: 14.53% (male 794,918/female 745,909)
15–24 years: 10.34% (male 577,134/female 519,819)
25–54 years: 39.6% (male 2,080,443/female 2,119,995)
55–64 years: 13.1% (male 656,404/female 732,936)
65 years and over: 22.43% (male 1,057,317/female 1,322,176) (2020 est.)

0–14 years: 13.83% (male 767,245/female 722,313)
15–24 years: 9.67% (male 532,179/female 509,487)
25–54 years: 42.45% (male 2,275,984/female 2,295,082)
55–64 years: 13.13% (male 692,420/female 721,641)
65 years and over: 20.91% (male 986,816/female 1,265,310) (2017 est.)

0–14 years: 14.2% (male 787,143/female 741,356)
15–64 years: 66.2% (male 3,555,447/female 3,567,383)
65 years and over: 19.6% (male 923,177/female 1,185,630) (2011 est.)

Median age
total: 45.3 years. Country comparison to the world: 9th
male: 43.7 years
female: 46.8 years (2020 est.)

total: 44.5 years
male: 43.5 years
female: 45.6 years (2017 est.)

total: 42.5 years
male: 41.4 years
female: 43.6 years (2011 est.)

Mother's mean age at first birth
29.9 years (2017 est.)

Total fertility rate
1.39 children born/woman (2021 est.) Country comparison to the world: 225th

Population growth rate
−0.34% (2021 est.) Country comparison to the world: 221st

Birth rate
7.72 births/1,000 population (2021 est.) Country comparison to the world: 222nd
8.4 births/1,000 population (2017 est.)

Death rate
12.05 deaths/1,000 population (2021 est.) Country comparison to the world: 14th

Net migration rate
0.97 migrant(s)/1,000 population (2021 est.) Country comparison to the world: 62nd

Life expectancy at birth
total population: 81.28 years. Country comparison to the world: 41st
male: 78.73 years
female: 84 years (2021 est.)

Infant mortality rate
total: 3.61 deaths/1,000 live births. Country comparison to the world: 204th
male: 4 deaths/1,000 live births
female: 3.19 deaths/1,000 live births (2021 est.)

Ethnic groups

population: Greek 91.6%, Albanian 4.4%, other 4% (2011) Note: data represent citizenship, since Greece does not collect data on ethnicity

Dependency ratios
total dependency ratio: 56.1
youth dependency ratio: 21.3
elderly dependency ratio: 34.8
potential support ratio: 2.9 (2020 est.)

Religions

Greek Orthodox (official) 81–90%, Muslim 2%, other 3%, none 4–15%, unspecified 1% (2015 est.)

Urbanization
urban population: 79.7% of total population (2020)
rate of urbanization: 0.22% annual rate of change (2015–20 est.)

Unemployment, youth ages 15–24
total: 39.9%. Country comparison to the world: 11th
male: 36.4%
female: 43.9% (2018 est.)

School life expectancy (primary to tertiary education)
total: 20 years
male: 20 years
female: 20 years (2018)

== Immigration ==
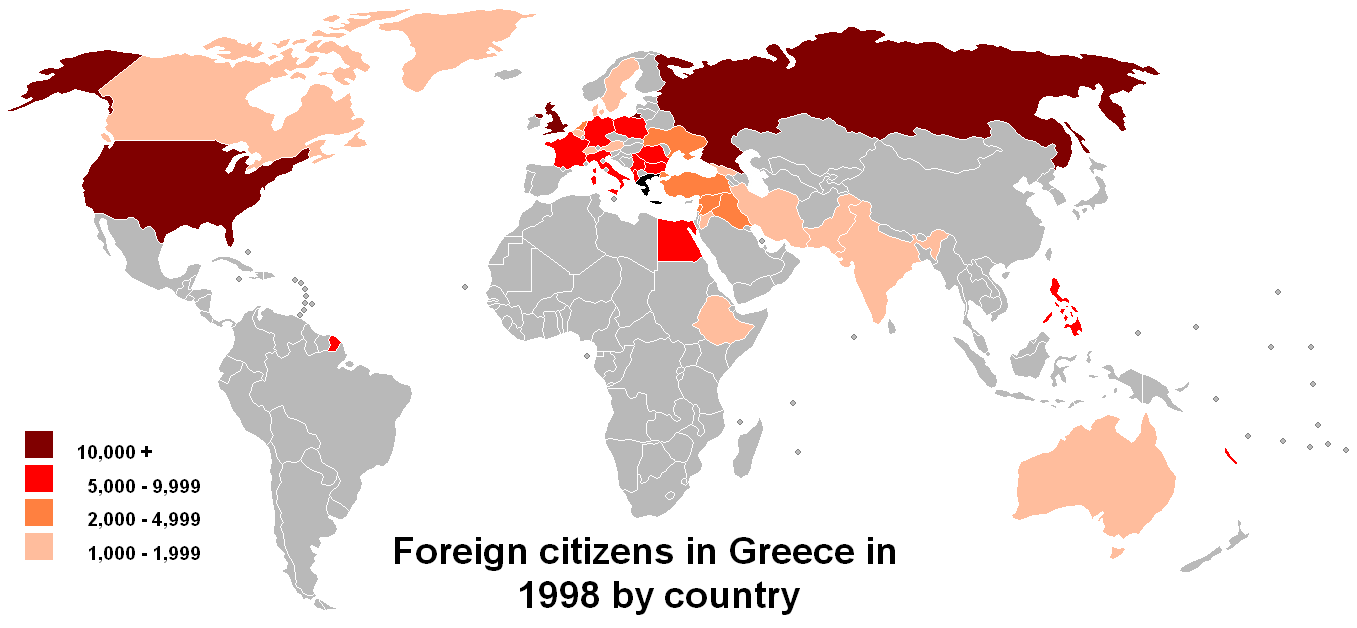
Foreign citizens in Greece in 1998 by country of citizenship.

Greece has received a large number of immigrants since the early 1990s. The majority of them come from the neighbouring countries. As of 2011, the number of foreigners in an enumerated total of 10,815,197 people was 911,299.

Foreign-born by country (Eurostat): The Top-15 per year are displayed for consistency.

Country	2010	2014	2020 n-aEU	2020 EU	2021
Albania	384,600	337,719	346,918	—N/a	374,926
(European Union) Bulgaria	45,700	40,914	—N/a (Note: The source doesn't include immigrants from the European Union, European Free Trade Association nations or the United Kingdom)	72,777	35,444
Pakistan	20,100	18,040	19,167	—N/a	35,309
(European Union) Romania	32,400	27,191	—N/a	44,600	28,250
Georgia	62,600	45,061	23,050	—N/a	26,083
Bangladesh	14,200	8,362	included into others	—N/a	17,189
Ukraine	13,300	10,662	18,056	—N/a	16,408
Afghanistan			included into others	—N/a	15,457
United Kingdom	5,200	10,736	—N/a	14,752	13,517
Russia	55,700	42,959	14,772	—N/a	13,415
Egypt	10,200	9,813	11,652	—N/a	12,453
India			13,259	—N/a	12,385
(European Union) Cyprus	10,200	10,881	—N/a	13,850	12,362
Syria	7,500	8,306	included into others	—N/a	10,785
Philippines			10,696	—N/a	10,585
(European Union) Poland	10,800	16,635	—N/a	13,560	included into others
(European Union) Germany	29,300	25,722	—N/a	10,336	included into others
China			19,814	—N/a	included into others
Turkey	9,500	12,469	included into others	—N/a	included into others
others	117,100	102,006	65,429	736,470 (Note: Of which 21,243 people are from the remaining EU countries and 1,630 are from the EFTA countries)	127,287
Total	828,400	727,477	524,813	906,345	761,855

Nationality of Greece over time
Nationality	1951		1961		1971		1981		1991		2001		2011		2021		2021 census	
Nationality	Number	%	Number	%	Number	%	Number	%	Number	%	Number	%	Number	%	Number	%	Number	%
(Greece) Greeks	7,602,230	99.60%	8,333,817	99.35%	8,675,804	98.94%	9,568,017	98.24%	10,092,624	98.37%	10,166,927	92.73%	9,903,268	91.57%	9,777,439	91.34%	9,716,889	92.70%
Foreigners	30,571	0.40%	54,736	0.65%	92,568	1.06%	171,424	1.76%	167,276	1.63%	797,093	7.27%	911,929	8.43%	921,485	8.61%	761,855	7.27%
(European Union) EU-27	–	–	–	–	–	–	–	–	–	–	–	–	199,101	1.84%	168,550	1.57%	116,669	1.11%
Non-EU															752,900	7.1%	641,921	6.12%
Total	7,632,801		8,388,553		8,768,372		9,739,441		10,259,900		10,964,020		10,815,197		10,698,837		10,482,487	

=== Net Migration ===
Net Migration of Greece (1991–2024)
Year	Immigration	Emigration	Net Migration
1991	151,978	64,628	87,350
1992	110,334	52,389	57,945
1993	107,462	52,929	54,533
1994	86,959	46,813	40,146
1995	98,989	47,967	51,022
1996	95,585	54,628	40,957
1997	113,477	51,794	61,683
1998	116,411	60,119	56,292
1999	84,695	54,175	30,520
2000	109,251	46,993	62,258
2001	98,471	45,909	52,562
2002	67,220	39,378	27,842
2003	63,141	37,433	25,708
2004	66,871	38,041	28,830
2005	70,933	38,583	32,350
2006	63,094	38,368	24,726
2007	63,298	40,400	22,898
2008	66,529	43,044	23,485
2009	58,613	43,686	14,927
2010	60,462	62,041	−1,579
2011	60,089	92,404	−32,315
2012	58,200	124,694	−66,494
2013	57,946	117,094	−59,148
2014	59,013	106,804	−47,791
2015	64,446	109,351	−44,905
2016	116,867	106,535	10,332
2017	112,247	103,327	8,920
2018	119,489	103,049	16,440
2019	129,459	95,020	34,439
2020	84,221	77,837	6,384
2021	57,120	79,596	−22,476
2022	96,662	80,307	16,355
2023	118,816	76,158	42,658
2024	132,149	78,014	54,135

=== Illegal immigration ===
Greece has received many illegal immigrants beginning in the 1990s and continuing during the 2000s and 2010s. Migrants make use of the many islands in the Aegean Sea, directly west of Turkey. A spokesman for the European Union's border control agency said that the Greek–Albanian border is "one of Europe's worst-affected external land borders." Migrants across the Evros region bordering Turkey face land-mines. Principal illegal immigrants include Albanians, Pakistanis, Kurds, Afghans, Iraqis and Somalis.

== Ethnic groups, languages and religion ==
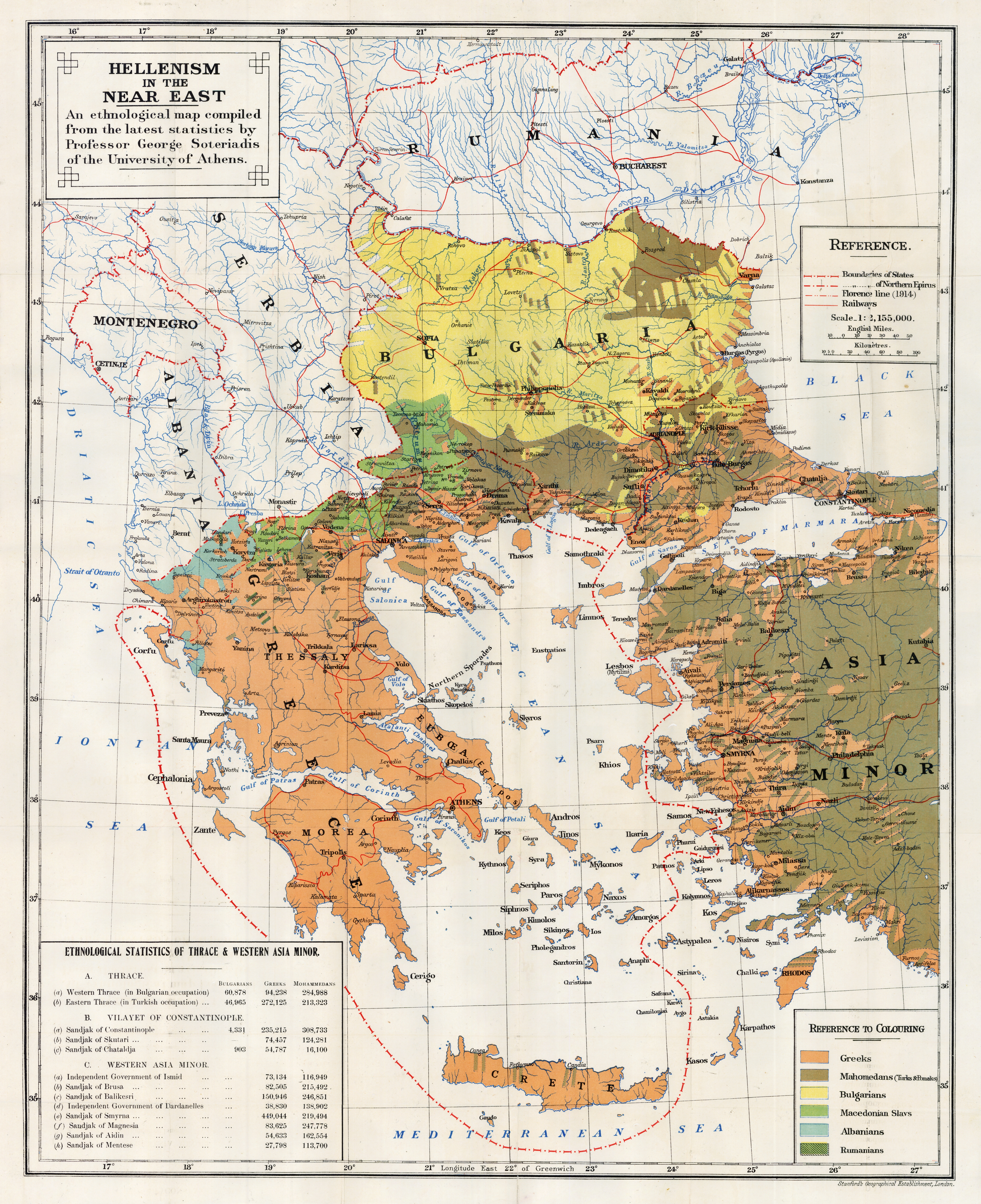
Ethnic map of Greece in 1918 during the Greek genocide.

The population of northern Greece has primarily been ethnically, religiously and linguistically diverse. The Muslim minority of Greece is the only explicitly recognized minority in Greece by the government. The officials define it as a group of Greek Muslims numbering 98,000 people, consisting of Turks (50%), Pomaks (35%) and Romani (15%). No other minorities are officially acknowledged by the government. There is no official information for the size of the ethnic, linguistic and religious minorities because asking the population questions pertaining to the topic have been abolished since 1951.

Note: Greek is the dominant language throughout Greece; inclusion in a non-Greek language zone does not necessarily imply that the relevant minority language is still spoken there, or that its speakers consider themselves an ethnic minority.

Religion in Greece for the period 2006–2015 according to Swiss Metadatabse of Religious Affiliation in Europe
1. Eastern Orthodoxy and other Christian (87.6%)
2. Unaffiliated (6.10%)
3. Islam (5.30%)
4. others (0.80%)

Minorities in Greece according to Minority Rights Group International in 2015:

- Roma: 265,000
- Vlachs (Aromanians and Megleno-Romanians): 200,000
- Ethnic Macedonians: 100,000–200,000
- Arvanites: 95,000
- Turks: 90,000
- Pomaks: 35,000–40,000
- Jews: 5,000

The official language of Greece is Greek, spoken by almost all as a second language at least. Additionally, there are a number of linguistic minority groups that are bilingual in a variety of non-Greek languages, and parts of these groups identify ethnically as Greeks.

Estimated historical population and census figures^{1}:
Language (and religion)	census 1879		estimate 1913		census 1928		census 1940		census 1951	
Language (and religion)	Number	%	Number	%	Number	%	Number	%	Number	%
Greek					5,759,523	92.8	6,902,339	92.5	7,297,878	95.6
Turkish (altogether)					191,254	3.1	229,075	3.8	179,895	2.4
Turkish (and Orthodox Christian)					103,642	1.7				
Turkish (and Muslim)					86,506	1.4				
Slavic^{3}			300,000–500,000	6.3–10.6	81,984^{2}	1.3	86,086	1.2	41,017	0.5
Bulgarian (and Muslim)					16,775	0.3				
Pomak							18,086	0.2	18,671	0.2
"Koutsovlach"					19,703	0.3	53,997	0.7	39,855	0.5
Albanian							49,632	0.7	22,736^{4}	0.3
Albanian/Arvanitika	225,000									
Albanian (and Muslim)					18,598	0.3				
Armenian					33,634	0.5	26,827	0.4	8,990	0.1
Roma					4,998	0.1	8,141	0.1	7,429	0.1
Russian					3,295	0.1	8,126	0.1	3,815	0.1
French							4,518	0.1	2,101	0.0
Romanian							2,901	0.0	2,082	0.0
English					2,098	0.0	3,529	0.0	1,456	0.0
Spanish					63,200	1.0	53,125	0.7	1,339	0.0
German							3,401	0.0	1,301	0.0
Italian					3,199	0.1	4,426	0.1	894	0.0
Hebrew or Yiddish							34	0.0	853	0.0
Others					6,248	0.1	5,694	0.1	2,489	0.1
Total	1,679,775		4,734,990		6,204,684		7,344,860		7,632,801	
Notes:^{1} Census figures are considered "unreliable".^{2}The 1928 census figure (81,984) of the Slavic speakers does not reflect their actual strength due to either an official policy or reluctance of the concerned, and perhaps represents a number of speakers, who are lacking Greek national consciousness, while contemporary Greek reports estimate at least 200,000 Bulgarian-speaking inhabitants in the country.^{3} The Slavic figure in the 1928, 1940 and 1951 census is referred to as a Macedonian Bulgarian dialect or Macedonian Slavic.^{4} The Albanian figure (22,746) in the 1951 census is considered "certainly too small" and a research in the 1970s indicated a figure of at least 30,000 in Attica and Boiotia alone.

Languages spoken in Greece:

Language	Classification	Speaking population	Spoken by	Ethnic population	Region	Notes
Greek classification
Cappadocian	IE, Greek, Attic	2,800 (2015 M. Janse)	Cappadocians		Mandra, Neo Agioneri and Xirochori	More distinct from standard Greek than Pontic Greek
Cretan		600,000	Cretans		Crete	
Greek	IE, Greek, Attic	10,700,000 (2012 European Commission )	national		scattered	Lexical similarity: 84%–93% with Greek in Cyprus
Greek, Ancient	IE, Greek, Attic	no known L1 speakers			scattered	religious language
Pontic	IE, Greek, Attic	200,000 (2001 Johnstone and Mandryk) – 400,000 (2009 Z. Diakonikolaou)	Pontians		Macedonia and Epirus(Kilkis, Pella, and Serres; Thessaloniki, Drama and Imathia)	Greek and Pontic speakers reportedly do not understand each other and Pontians do not speak standard Greek
Romano-Greek	mixed Greek–Romani	30 (2000)	Romani		Thessaly, Central Greece	Structured on Greek with heavy Romani lexicon
Sarakatsani	IE, Greek, Doric	80,000	Sarakatsani		Central Greece, Thessaly, Epirus	
Tsakonian	IE, Greek, Doric	200 (2007 Salminen)–1,500 (2010 M. Kisilier)	Tsakonians		Agios Andreas, Leonidio, Prastos, Kastanitsa, Pramatefti, Sapounakeika, Sitena, and Tyros	Not inherently intelligible with modern Greek. Lexical similarity with standard Greek: 70% or less.
Other languages
Albanian, Arvanitika	IE, Albanian, Tosk	50,000 (1993 Lunden, 2007 Salminen)	Arvanites	150,000	southern Euboea, Salamis, Boeotia, Attica, Peloponnese, Western Greece and the Ionian Islands, Thessaly and Central Greece, Thrace	Heavily influenced by Greek. Christian
Albanian, Tosk	IE, Albanian, Tosk	10,000 (2002)	Tosk Albanians		Epirus and Western Macedonia(Central Florina, into Kastoria, Lechovo)	Cham Tosk
Arabic	Afro-Asiatic, Semitic, Central, South	28,000	Arabs			
Assyrian Neo-Aramaic	Afro-Asiatic, Semitic, Central, Aramaic, Eastern, Central, Northeastern	2,000	Assyrians			
Armenian, Western	IE, Armenian	20,000 (2007)	Armenians		scattered, Attica, Thessaly and Central Greece	
Aromanian	IE, Italic, Romance, Eastern	50,000 (1999 Salminen) – 200,000 (1995 Greek Monitor of Human and Minority Rights)	Aromanians	700,000 (Trâ Armânami Association of French Aromanians)	Pindus Mountains, around Trikala, Epirus, Thessaly, Macedonia	Christian
Bulgarian	IE, Balto-Slavic, Slavic, South, Eastern	56,200 (2014), 10–40,000 (Trudgill)	Pomaks, Bulgarians		Macedonia and Thrace	Pomak, Muslim
English	IE, Germanic, West	8,000				
German	IE, Germanic, West	L1 users: 10,800 (2011 census), L2 users: 541,000 (2012 European Commission)				L1 users based on nationality
Greek sign language	Sign language	5,000 (2014 EUD) – 62,500 (2014 IMB)	national		scattered	
Judeo-Italian	IE, Italic, Romance, Italo-Western, Italo-Dalmatian	50 (2007 Salminen)	Jews		Peloponnese, Western Greece and the Ionian Islands	
Kurdish, Northern	IE, Indo-European, Indo-Iranian, Iranian, Western, Northwestern, Kurdish	22,500	Kurds			
Ladino	IE, Italic, Romance, Italo-Western, Western, Gallo-Iberian, Ibero-Romance, West Iberian, Castilian	2,000	Jews			
Megleno-Romanian	IE, Italic, Romance, Eastern	3,000 (2002) – 12,000 (1995)	Megleno-Romanians		Moglena	
Romani, Balkan	IE, Indo-Iranian, Indo-Aryan, Intermediate Divisions, Western, Romani	40,000 (1996 B. Igla)	Romani		Attica; Macedonia, Peloponnese, Western Greece and the Ionian Islands, Epirus	Christian, Muslim
Romani, Vlax	IE, Indo-Iranian, Indo-Aryan, Intermediate Divisions, Western, Romani	1,000	Romani		Attica, Thessaly, Central Greece, Epirus, Western Macedonia	Christian
Russian	IE, Balto-Slavic, Slavic, East		Russians			
Serbian	IE, Balto-Slavic, Slavic, South, Western		Serbs			
Slavic	IE, Balto-Slavic, Slavic, South, Eastern	60–90,000 (Trudgill), 250,000 (2007 Boskov)	Slavic-speakers of Greek Macedonia		Macedonia (mainly Florina, Pella and Thessaloniki; Kastoria, Kozani, Kilkis, Imathia, Serres), Epirus (Ioannina)	Christian
Turkish	Turkic, Southern	40,000 (L1: 9,700, L2: 30,300, 2014)	Turks, Karamanlides, Pomaks		Macedonia and Thrace, Aegean	Muslim, Christian
Turkish, Balkan Gagauz	Turkic, Southern		Gagauzes			
Urum	Turkic		Urums			

Religious population in Greece at the 1951 Census
Orthodox	7,472,559 (97.9%)
Muslim	112,665 (1.4%)
Catholic	28,430 (0.4%)
Protestant and other Christian	12,677 (0.2%)
Jewish	6,325 (0.1%)
Total	7,632,801

According to the Greek constitution, Eastern Orthodox Christianity is recognized as the "prevailing religion" in Greece. During the centuries that Greece was part of the Ottoman Empire, besides its spiritual mandate, the Orthodox Church, based in Constantinople (present-day Istanbul), also functioned as an official representative of the Christian population of the empire. The Church is often credited with the preservation of the Greek language, values, and national identity during Ottoman times. The Church was also an important rallying point in the war for independence against the Ottoman Empire, although the official Church in Constantinople initially condemned the breakout of the armed struggle in fear of retaliation from the Ottoman side. The Church of Greece was established shortly after the formation of a Greek national state. Its authority to this day extends only to the areas included in the independent Greek state before the Balkan Wars of 1912–1913. There is a Muslim minority concentrated in Thrace and officially protected by the Treaty of Lausanne (1923). Besides Pomaks (Muslim Bulgarian speakers) and Roma, it consists mainly of ethnic Turks, who speak Turkish and receive instruction in Turkish at special government-funded schools. There are also a number of Jews in Greece, most of whom live in Thessaloniki. There are also some Greeks who adhere to a reconstruction of the ancient Greek religion. A place of worship has been recognized as such by court.

== Education ==
Greek education is free and compulsory for children between the ages of 5 and 15. English study is compulsory from first grade through high school. University education, including books, is also free, contingent upon the student's ability to meet stiff entrance requirements. A high percentage of the student population seeks higher education. More than 100,000 students are registered at Greek universities, and 15% of the population currently holds a university degree. Admission in a university is determined by state-administered exams, the candidate's grade-point average from high school, and his/her priority choices of major. About one in four candidates gains admission to Greek universities.

Greek law does not currently offer official recognition to the graduates of private universities that operate in the country, except for those that offer a degree valid in another European Union country, which is automatically recognized by reciprocity. As a result, a large and growing number of students are pursuing higher education abroad. The Greek Government decides through an evaluation procedure whether to recognize degrees from specific foreign universities as qualification for public sector hiring. Other students attend private, post-secondary educational institutions in Greece that are not recognized by the Greek Government. At the moment extensive public talk is made for the reform of the Constitution to recognize private higher education in Greece as equal with public and to place common regulations for both.

The number of Greek students studying at European institutions is increasing along with EU support for educational exchange. In addition, nearly 5,000 Greeks are studying in the United States, about half of whom are in graduate school. Greek per capita student representation in the US (one every 2,200) is among the highest in Europe.

== See also ==
- Demographic history of Greece
- Turks of Western Thrace
- Immigration to Greece
- Minorities in Greece
- Aging of Europe
- Albanian immigrants in Greece
