= Sotiris Bletsas =

Greek Aromanian minority rights activist

- Born: 1956 (age 69–70); Grammatiko, Greece
- Education: Università Iuav di Venezia; Polytechnic University of Milan
- Occupations: Architect, minority rights activist, politician
- Known for: Being convincted and then acquitted over minority languages activism in Greece

Sotiris Bletsas (born 1956; Aromanian: Sutir Bletsa; Greek: Σωτήρης Μπλέτσας) is an architect, Aromanian language activist and politician from Greece. In 2001, he received a jail sentence for distributing material about minority languages in Greece, subsequently appealing the decision successfully and being acquitted.

== Biography ==
Bletsas was born in 1956 in Grammatiko, in the Karditsa regional unit, with origins from Gardiki, in the Trikala regional unit. He lived in Grammatiko until he finished primary school, then completed his secondary education in Sofades and at the boys’ secondary school in Trikala (Trikolj). Bletsas studied architecture at the Università Iuav di Venezia, graduating in 1981 and specializing in reinforced concrete the following year at the Polytechnic University of Milan. Ever since, he worked in architecture, having attended various seminars on architecture and business administration.

In 1995, at an Aromanian festival in Greece, he distributed some European Bureau for Lesser-Used Languages (EBLUL) material about minority languages in Greece. In 2001, on an initiative of the MP for Edessa Evgenios Haïtidis, he was charged with "dissemination of false information" (contrary to article 191 of the Greek Penal Code) who reportedly was supported by the leadership of the Panhellenic Federation of Cultural Associations of Vlachs. The case drew protest from the Greek Helsinki Monitor and from abroad.

He was first found guilty and sentenced to fifteen months in jail, suspended for three years, and fined 500,000 drachmas; however, he successfully appealed the decision and was subsequently found not guilty on 18 October 2001. Amnesty International's British branch had referred to Bletsas' conviction as "clearly in breach of Greece's obligations under the European Convention of Human Rights to uphold freedom of expression", stating that it could be seen as promoting intolerance.

Bletsas has held the position of director in the Greek branch of the EBLUL, established in January 2002, being among the several Aromanians to have done so. Bletsas asserts that the Aromanian language should be officially recognized in Greece and that the country's minority languages would generate more cultural richness if they received an official recognition status, as "this is what the practices of developed Western countries show us".

Bletsas ran as a candidate in Trikala for the Movement of Democratic Socialists (KIDISO) during the 2015 Greek parliamentary election. He was a candidate for municipal councilor of Trikala in the list of the local politician Konstantinos Kremmydas in the 2019 Greek local elections. Bletsas was the sixth candidate in PASOK – Movement for Change (PASOK-KINAL)'s list for Trikala in the 2019 Greek parliamentary election.

== See also ==
- Human rights in Greece
- Minorities in Greece
