= Greek-speaking Muslims =

Greek-speaking Muslims may refer to:

- Greek Muslims, Muslims of Greek ethnic origin
- Muslim minority (Greece), the multiethnic Muslim minority in Thrace in Greece
