= Turks of the Dodecanese =

Turkish community

Dodecanese Turks
On İki Ada Türkleri

Total population
- 5,000

Languages
- Greek and Turkish

Religion
- Sunni Islam

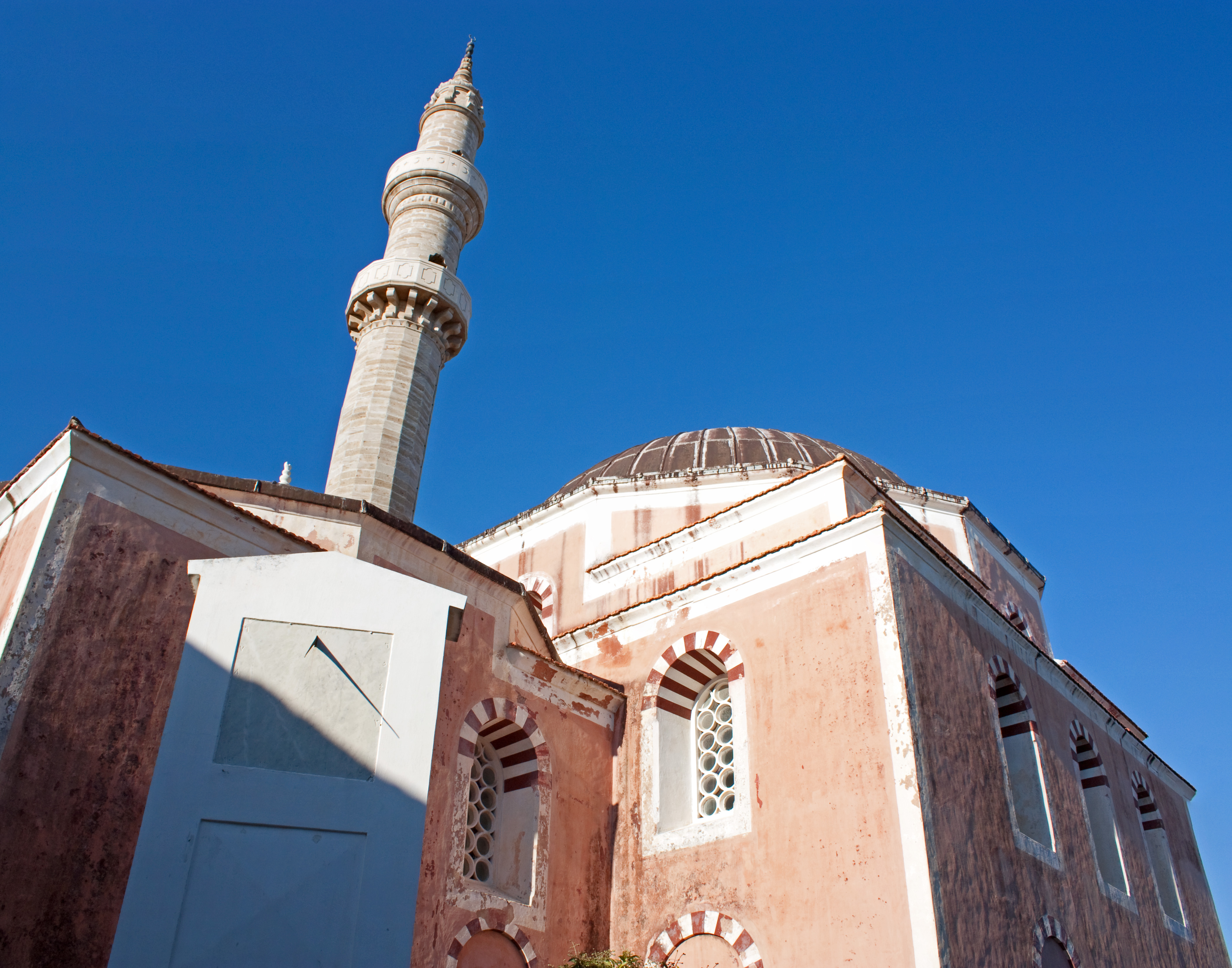
Suleymaniye Mosque in Rhodes

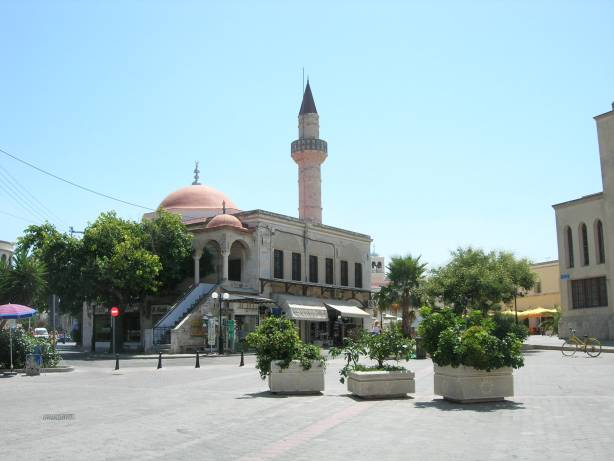
Defterdar Mosque in Kos

The Turks of the Dodecanese (Turkish: On İki Ada Türkleri) are a community of ethnic Turks, indigenous Greek Muslims and Cretan Muslims living on the Dodecanese islands of Rhodes (Turkish: Rodos) and Kos (Turkish: İstanköy).

== History ==
The Dodecanese was gradually settled by Turks from the Anatolian mainland from the 1480s onwards, added to by the Greek Muslims whose ancestors on the islands converted to Islam in the Ottoman period and were consequently referred to as 'Turks' as a synonym for Ottoman Muslim rather than because of their actual ethnic origin. The main island of Rhodes passed from Hospitaller to Ottoman rule in 1522. After almost four centuries under the Ottoman Empire, control of the Dodecanese passed to Italy in the aftermath of the Italo-Turkish War of 1912. The Turkish population on the island was not affected by the 1923 population exchange, because the Dodecanese islands were under the rule of the Kingdom of Italy at the time. All inhabitants of the islands became Greek citizens after 1947 when the islands became part of Greece. Their population is estimated at less than 5,000 individuals.

The Turks in Kos are partly organized around the Muslim Association of Kos, which estimates that the community on the island numbers approximately 2,000 individuals. Those in Rhodes are organized around the Moslem Association of Rhodes, which estimates that the community numbers roughly 3,500 people. The president of their association Mazloum Paizanoglou has said that the communities number approximately 2,500 in Rhodes and 2,000 in Kos.

== See also ==
- Minorities in Greece
- Turkish minorities in the former Ottoman Empire
- Turks of Western Thrace
- Cretan Turks
- Muslim minority of Greece

== Bibliography ==
- Clogg, Richard (2002), Minorities in Greece, Hurst & Co. Publishers, ISBN 1-85065-706-8.
