= Panhellenic Federation of Cultural Associations of Vlachs =

Aromanian cultural organization in Greece

- Logo of the Panhellenic Federation of Cultural Associations of Vlachs
- Formation: 1985; 41 years ago
- Type: NGO
- Headquarters: Larissa
- Location: Greece
- President: Michalis Mageirias
- Website: Official website

The Panhellenic Federation of Cultural Associations of Vlachs (Greek: Πανελλήνια Ομοσπονδία Πολιτιστικών Συλλόγων Βλάχων, romanized: Panellínia Énosi Politistikón Syllógon Vlachón Elládos) is an organization of Aromanians ("Vlachs") in Greece. The Aromanians are an ethnic group scattered over the Balkans living in many countries such as Albania, Bulgaria, North Macedonia, Romania and Serbia, as well as Greece, which has the largest concentration of them. The Aromanians of Greece are characterized by their disinterest in initiatives that aim to maintain the Aromanian culture and language outside the familiar environment and many have repeatedly expressed opposition to foreign organizations that have tried to help them achieve this.

The Panhellenic Federation of Cultural Associations of Vlachs is the largest Aromanian cultural organization in Greece and the world. As of 2001, the organization was made up of 65 minor Aromanian associations. This number had risen to 85 in 2004 and to 101 in 2009. Usually, other Aromanian organizations in Greece are not active, and none of the around 200 that exist in the country have a name in the Aromanian language. In fact, many of them do not even have the word "Vlach" in their names.

The Panhellenic Federation of Cultural Associations of Vlachs was founded in 1985 as a result of a meeting between several Aromanian associations one year earlier. Many of these associations were recent, as most of them appeared on the 1980s. The organization's original name was "Panhellenic Union of Cultural Associations of Vlachs", but it was changed to the current one in 2001. Having its headquarters at Larissa, the Panhellenic Federation of Cultural Associations of Vlachs organizes several activities and events. Among them are the publication of newspapers, articles and calendars, the promotion of Aromanian culture, dances, songs and traditions, the holding of cultural events and the annual organization of the "Panhellenic Meetings" between Aromanians, which last three days.

The Panhellenic Federation of Cultural Associations of Vlachs regards the Aromanians as part of the Greek ethnicity. In fact, as a response to Recommendation 1333 (1997) of the Parliamentary Assembly of the Council of Europe which encouraged the Balkan states to protect their Aromanian minorities, issued after having been persuaded to do so by the Union for Aromanian Language and Culture in Germany, it has repeatedly denied on various occasions the status of the Aromanians as an ethnic minority within Greece, stating that the "Vlach-speaking Greeks" are historically and culturally an "integral part of Hellenism".

As of 2009, the president of the organization was Kostas Adam and its vice-president was Yoanis Kokonis. As of 2022, the president was Michalis Mageirias, the first vice-president Batzotasios Ioannis and the second vice-president Georgios Dardakoulis.

== See also ==
- Aromanians in Greece
- Aromanian question
- Grecoman
- List of Aromanian cultural organizations
