= Turks in Greece =

Turks in Greece may refer to:

- Turks of Crete
- Turks of the Dodecanese
- Turks of Western Thrace

== See also ==
- Muslim minority of Greece
