= Minorities in Greece =

Minorities in Greece are small in size compared to Balkan regional standards, and the country is largely ethnically homogeneous. This is mainly due to the population exchanges between Greece and neighboring Turkey (Convention of Lausanne) and Bulgaria (Treaty of Neuilly), which removed most Muslims (with the exception of the Muslims of Western Thrace) and those Christian Slavs who did not identify as Greeks from Greek territory. The treaty also provided for the resettlement of ethnic Greeks from those countries, later to be followed by refugees. There is no official information for the size of the ethnic, linguistic and religious minorities because asking the population questions pertaining to the topic have been abolished since 1951.

The main officially recognized "minority" (μειονότητα, meionótita) is the Muslim minority (μουσουλμανική μειονότητα, mousoulmanikí meionótita) in Thrace, Northern Greece, which numbered 120,000 according to the 2001 census and mainly consists of Western Thrace Turks, Pomaks (both mainly inhabiting Western Thrace), and also Romani, found particularly in central and Northern Greece. Other recognized minority groups are the Armenians numbering approximately 35,000, and the Jews (Sephardim and Romaniotes) numbering approximately 5,500.

== Religious minorities ==
The Greek constitution defines the Eastern Orthodox Church as the "prevailing religion" in Greece, and over 95% of the population claim membership in it. Any other religion not explicitly defined by law (e.g. unlike Islam and Judaism, which are explicitly recognized) may acquire the status of a "known religion", a status which allows the religion's adherents to worship freely, and to have constitutional recognition. After a court ruling, the criteria for acquiring the status of a "known religion" were defined as being a "religion or a dogma whose doctrine is open and not secret, is taught publicly and its rites of worship are also open to the public, irrespective of whether its adherents have religious authorities; such a religion or dogma needs not to be recognized or approved by an act of the State or Church". This covers most religious minorities such as Roman Catholics, Evangelicals, Pentecostals, Seventh-day Adventists, Methodists, and Jehovah's Witnesses. All known religions to be considered by the Greek state legal entities under private law must establish an association, foundation, or charitable fund-raising committee pursuant to the Civil Code. The Roman Catholic Church refuses to be considered a legal person under private or public law and has requested recognition by its own canon law. In July 1999, following a parliamentary amendment, the legal entity status of all institutions of the Roman Catholic Church established before 1946 was reconfirmed. There is no formal mechanism that exists to gain recognition as a "known religion". There are also around two thousand Greeks who adhere to a reconstruction of the ancient Greek Religion. A place of worship has been recognized as such by court.

=== Muslim ===
There is a Muslim minority who are Greek citizens living in Thrace, concentrated in the Rhodope and Xanthi regional units. According to the 1991 census, there were 98,000 Muslims in western Thrace, 50% of them of Turkish ethnic origin, with 35% Pomaks and the remaining 15% Roma. Other sources estimate the size of the Muslim minority at 0.95% of the population, or approximately 110,000. Aside from the indigenous Muslim minority in Greece, the Muslim immigrant population in the rest of the country was estimated at 200,000 to 300,000, though these are recent migrants and generally not considered a minority. Under Greek administration, the Muslim minority of Greece has adopted a moderate, non-political form of Islam. The Lausanne Treaty and as a result the Greek government define the rights of the Muslim communities in Western Thrace, both Turkish and Pomak, on the basis of religion instead of ethnicity.

==== Turks ====
A Turkish community currently lives in Western Thrace, in the north-eastern part of Greece. According to the 1991 census, there were approximately 50,000 Turks, out of the approximately 98,000 Muslim minority of Greece Other sources estimate the size of the minority between 120,000 and 130,000. The Turks of Thrace descend from Turkish populations living in the area during the Ottoman period. Like the Greeks of Istanbul, they were exempted from the 1923 population exchange; in contrast, Greek Muslims in Macedonia were not exempt from the exchange and so expatriated to Turkey.

The Greek government continues to deliver Turkish-language public education, and there are two Islamic theological seminaries, one in Komotini and one in Echinos. The Turkish community of Greece enjoys full equality under the law, adopting Turkish names, publishing numerous Turkish-language newspapers, operating Turkish-language radio stations, converse freely in Turkish and use Turkish in Greek courts. They are allowed to maintain their own Turkish-language schools, which catered to about 8,000 students in the 1999-2000 school year. Since 1920, members of the Turkish minority participate in elections, electing representatives to Parliament. The great majority of Turkic Muslims in Thrace espouse moderate political views and are ready to work and prosper as citizens of the Greek state, with the exception of a relatively small group of ethnocentric activists.

In 1922, Turks owned 84% of the land in Western Thrace, but now the minority estimates this figure to be 20–40%. This stems from various practices of the Greek administration whereby ethnic Greeks are encouraged to purchase Turkish land with soft loans granted by the state. The Greek government refers to the Turkish community as Greek Muslims or Hellenic Muslims, and does not recognise a Turkish minority in Western Thrace. Greek courts have also outlawed the use of the word 'Turkish' to describe the Turkish community. In 1988, the Greek High Court affirmed a 1986 decision of the Court of Appeals of Thrace in which the Union of Turkish Associations of Western Thrace was ordered closed. The court held that the use of the word 'Turkish' referred to citizens of Turkey, and could not be used to describe citizens of Greece; the use of the word 'Turkish' to describe 'Greek Muslims' was held to endanger public order. Greece continued this stance in the beginning 21st century when Greek courts ruled to dissolve or prohibit formation of Turkish associations. (Note: Once again Xanthi Turkish Union not restored by Greek courts despite ECtHR judgement)

Apart from Thrace, a small minority of Turks exists in the Dodecanese islands of Rhodes and Kos. They were not included in the 1923 population exchange as the Dodecanese were annexed from Italy in 1947 after World War II. After annexation of islands, their Muslim inhabitants, Greek and Turkish speakers, were granted Greek citizenship. Today, about 5,000 Turks live in the Dodecanese islands of Rhodes (numbering 3,000) and Kos (numbering 2,000) and use Turkish in everyday life. In Rhodes and Kos, the teaching of the Turkish language was de facto abolished in the early 1970s.

==== Pomaks ====
The Muslim Bulgarian-speaking minority are known as Pomaks (Greek: Πομάκοι, Pomakoi, Bulgarian: Помаци, Pomatsi). They reside mainly in villages in the Rhodope Mountains in Thrace, in Evros, Xanthi and Rhodope regional units of Greece. According to the 2001 Greek census it is estimated that in total there are 36,000 Pomaks, of whom 23,000 live in Xanthi regional unit, 11,000 live in Rhodope regional unit and 2,000 live in Evros regional unit.

The language they speak is generally classified as a dialect of Bulgarian, and more specifically is the "Central Rhodope dialect" or Smolyan dialect. Despite their mother language, many Pomaks also self-identify as Turks This Turkification has a number of reasons, including the fact that Turks and Pomaks were part of the same millet during the years when their homeland was part of the Ottoman Empire.

Under Greek law, the Muslim minority (including the Pomaks) has a right to education in its own language. In practice however, only Turkish is used. This is due to the Turkish self-identification of the Pomaks, and the fact that this trend was promoted until recently by the Greek authorities (who from 1968 until the 1980s even officially recognized the Pomaks as Turks) in order to distance them from the Bulgarians. There have been Greek-Pomak dictionaries published and a language primer in the Bulgarian language (in Greek script) has been published for use in Pomak schools. Recently, news have begun to be broadcast in the native language of the Pomaks.

Most Pomaks are fluent in their Pomak dialects (spoken amongst themselves), Turkish (their language of education, and the main language of the Muslim minority), Greek (the official language of the Greek state), and may know some Arabic (the language of the Qur'an).

== Other minorities ==
=== Armenians ===
There are approximately 35,000 Armenians in Greece out of which approximately 20,000 can speak the Armenian language. The community's main political representative is the Armenian National Committee of Greece; its headquarters are in Athens with branches all over Greece. The community also manages its own educational institutions. Approximately 95% of Armenians in Greece are Armenian Orthodox, with the rest being Armenian Catholics or Evangelicals. Some of these Armenians belong to the Church of Greece, they are called Hayhurum.

=== Jews ===
Population of Thessaloniki
Year	Total Pop.	Jewish Pop.	Jewish %
1842	70,000	36,000	51%
1870	90,000	50,000	56%
1882/84	85,000	48,000	56%
1902	126,000	62,000	49%
1913	157,889	61,439	39%
1943		53,000	
2001	363,987	1,000	0.3%

The interaction between Greece and the Jews dates back to ancient times. Alexander the Great reached ancient Judea and was welcomed by the Jews. Following his death, war erupted between the Hellenized Jews and Greeks and the Jewish conservative Maccabees that embittered relations between Greeks and Jews for centuries.

During the Ottoman Empire, Jews like all other non-Muslims had a degree of autonomy under the Millet system which classified populations according to religion rather than ethnicity or language. Thessaloniki in particular had a large Jewish population, mostly consisting of Sephardim who settled in Ottoman lands after the 1492 expulsion of the Jews from Spain. Sephardim used to speak Ladino until well into the 20th century. The Romaniotes, on the other hand, are Jews who lived in the territory of today's Greece and neighboring areas for more than 2,000 years. Their language is Greek (and a Greek dialect called Yevanic language); they derive their name from the Byzantine name for the Greeks, "Rhomaioi".

Since independence in 1821, Greece continued to have a significant and active Jewish community with a long and rich cultural heritage.

The Jewish population of Greece increased markedly after the Greco-Turkish War (1919–1922) when Thessaloniki became part of the Greek kingdom, though the 1923 population exchange between Greece and Turkey diluted the Jewish population of Thessaloniki.

During the Holocaust, 86% of Greek Jews, especially those in the areas occupied by Nazi Germany and Bulgaria, were killed, despite efforts by the Greek Orthodox Church hierarchy, the EAM resistance movement and individual Greeks (both Christian and Communist) to shelter Jews. These efforts were particularly notable in Zakynthos, where not a single local Jew was killed in the Holocaust.

=== Ethnic Macedonians ===
The Greek government does not officially recognize an ethnic Macedonian minority of Slavic origin in Greece. Nevertheless, the Greek Helsinki Monitor issued a report in September 1999, which claimed that about 10,000–30,000 ethnic Macedonians live in Greece, but because of the absence of an official census it is impossible to determine the exact number. A political party called "Rainbow" promotes this line and claims minority rights of what they describe as the "Macedonian minority in Greece". In the 2014 European Parliament election, Rainbow tallied a countrywide total of 5,759 votes, or 0.1% percentage. However, 2.5 million ethnic Greeks identify as Macedonian, unrelated to the Slavic people who are associated with the Republic of North Macedonia.

In 2008 a United Nations independent expert on minority issues, Gay McDougall, personally visited Greece to check the current situation regarding the minorities. As the report published on the UN Human Rights Council web site says: "The Independent Expert met numerous individuals identifying as ethnic Macedonian." Moreover, she urges: "the Government of Greece to withdraw from the dispute over whether there is a Macedonian or a Turkish minority in Greece and focus on protecting the rights to self-identification, freedom of expression and freedom of association of those communities."

== Linguistic and cultural communities ==
In addition to the above minorities, there are various ethnolinguistic communities in Greece with a distinct identity and language, but whose members largely identify ethnically as Greeks and do not consider themselves a "minority".

Regions with a traditional presence of languages other than Greek. Greek is today spoken as the dominant language throughout the country.

=== Albanian-speaking ===
Albanian economic migrants are not to be confused with the Greek Orthodox Arvanites, a group who traditionally speak a form of Tosk Albanian in addition to Greek and self-identify as Greeks, having played a significant role in the Greek War of Independence and Greek culture in general.

The Chams were an ethnic Albanian community that formerly inhabited the area of Thesprotia, part of the Greek region of Epirus. Most of them were expelled into Albania through government-supported ethnic cleansing at the end of World War II.

There are other Albanian speaking communities found across other regions of Greece. In the Florina region Albanian speakers can be found in the villages of Flampouro, Drosopigi, Idroussa and Tripotamos. Furthermore, an estimated 39 mainly or partly Albanian-speaking villages can be found in Western Thrace and Central Macedonia.

After 1991, with the collapse of communism in Albania, a huge number of Albanian immigrants live and work in Greece. In the 2001 census, 274,390 ethnic Albanians are reported residing in Greece, mostly economic migrants. Albanians constitute 63.7% of the total documented migrant population in Greece, followed by Bulgarians, Georgians, Romanians, Russians, and Ukrainians.

=== Romance-speakers ===
==== Aromanians ====
In Greece, the Aromanians are called Vlachs (Greek: Βλάχοι, /'Vlaçi/). There are numerous festivals celebrating Aromanian culture all over Greece. Their language, Aromanian (known in Greek as τα βλάχικα /'vlaçika/), is in danger of extinction and mostly spoken by the elderly. There are, however, small numbers of Aromanians in Greece who call for greater recognition of the Aromanian language, such as Sotiris Bletsas. It is hypothesized that these Vlachs originated from the Roman colonisation of the Balkans and are the descendants of Latinised native peoples and Roman legionaries who had settled in the Balkans. German researcher Thede Kahl claims to have also documented some cases of assimilation of the Aromanian population in regions which are now largely Greek-speaking. The Panhellenic Federation of Cultural Associations of Vlachs has publicly stated that they do not want Aromanian recognized as a minority language nor do they want it inserted into the education system, and the same organization also protested when Thede Kahl discussed in a paper whether they could be designated a "minority".

==== Megleno-Romanians ====
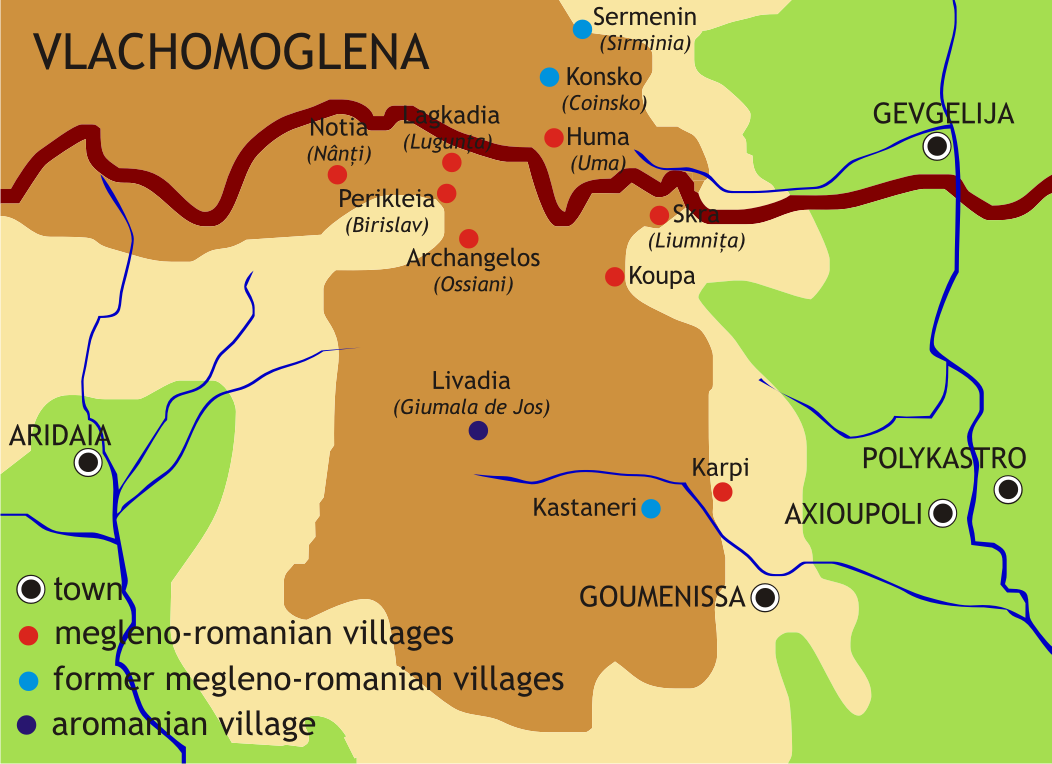
Map of Megleno-Romanians settlements in Greece and Republic of North Macedonia

Megleno-Romanians are concentrated in the Moglena region of Greek Macedonia. They speak the Megleno-Romanian language which is known as Vlăhește by its speakers. An estimated 4,000 speakers can be found in the region spanning the Pella and Kilkis regional units of Central Macedonia. The largest Megleno-Romanian settlement is Notia.

=== Romani ===
The history of Romani in Greece goes back over 600 years to the 15th century. The name Gypsy sometimes used for the Romani people was first given to them by the Greeks who supposed them to be Egyptian in origin. Due to their nomadic nature, they are not concentrated in a specific geographical area but are dispersed all over the country. The majority of the Greek Romani are Orthodox Christians who speak the Vlax Romani language in addition to Greek. Most of the Romani who live in Western Thrace are Muslims and speak a dialect of the same language.

The Romani in Greece live scattered through the whole territory of the country, but with larger concentration in the bigger cities (mainly Athens and Thessalonica). Notable centres of Romani life in Greece are Agia Varvara, which has a very successful Romani community, and Ano Liosia, where conditions are bad. Romani largely maintain their own customs and traditions. Although a large number of Romani has adopted a sedentary and urban way of living, there are still nomadic settlements in some areas. The nomads at the settlements often differentiate themselves from the rest of the population. They number 200,000 according to the Greek government. According to the National Commission for Human Rights that number is closer to 250,000 and according to the Greek Helsinki Watch group to 300,000.

As a result of neglect by the state, among other factors, the Romani communities in Greece face several problems including high instances of child labour and abuse, low school attendance, police discrimination and drug trafficking. The most serious issue is the housing problem since many Romani in Greece still live in tents, on properties they do not own, making them subject to eviction. In the past decade these issues have received wider attention and some state funding.

=== Slavic-speaking ===
Slavic languages have been spoken in the region of Macedonia alongside Greek and others since the invasions of the Slavs in the 6th and 7th centuries AD. In parts of northern Greece, in the regions of Macedonia (Μακεδονία) and Thrace (Θράκη), Slavonic languages continue to be spoken by people with a wide range of self-identifications. The actual linguistic classification of these dialects is unclear, although most linguists will classify them as either Bulgarian or Macedonian taking into account numerous factors, including the resemblance and mutual intelligibility of each dialect to the standard languages (abstand) and the speakers' self-identification. (As however the vast majority do not have a Bulgarian or Macedonian national identity, linguists base their decisions on abstand alone.) Now, these people mainly identify as ethnic Greeks.

The Christian portion of Greece's Slavic-speaking minority are commonly referred to as Slavophones (from the Greek Σλαβόφωνοι Slavophōnoi — literally "Slavic-speakers") or Dopii (which means "locals" in Greek). The vast majority of them espouse a Greek national identity and are bilingual in Greek. They live mostly in the region of Western Macedonia and adhere to the Greek Orthodox Church. The fact that the majority of these people self-identify as Greek makes their number uncertain. The second group is made up of those who seem to reject any national identity (Greek or Slav Macedonian) but have distinct ethnic identity, which they may call "indigenous" (dopia), Slavomacedonian, or Macedonian. The smallest group is made up of those who have a clear Macedonian national identity and consider themselves as part of the same nation that predominates in the neighboring Republic of North Macedonia. A crucial element of that controversy is the very name Macedonian, as it is also used by a much more numerous group of people with a Greek national identity to indicate their regional identity. Slavic speakers also use the term "Macedonians" or "Slavomacedonians", though in a regional rather than an ethnic sense. Until and including the 1951 census, the question of mother tongue was asked throughout Greece, so this gives a rough idea as to the size of this group, and later estimates are usually based on this figure.

The national identity of this community has frequently been loaded with political implications. The Politis-Kalfov Protocol signed on September 29, 1925 purported to recognize the Slav-speakers of Greek Macedonia as Bulgarians, but this protocol was never ratified. A short lived agreement was signed August 1926, which recognized them as a Serbian minority.

In the 1951 census, 41,017 people claimed to speak the Slavic language.

== See also ==
- Centre for the Macedonian Language in Greece
- Demographics of Greece
- Hellenization
- Cultural assimilation
- Greco-Turkish War (1919–1922)
- Grecomans
- Human rights in Greece
- Iraqis in Greece
