= Muslim minority of Greece =

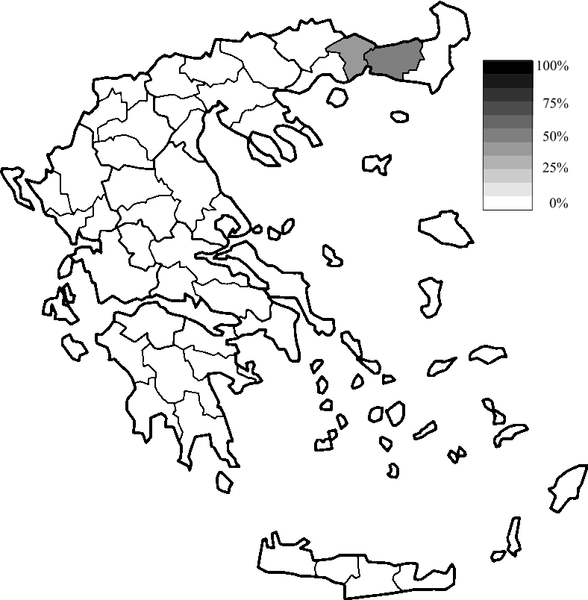
Map of the Greek Prefectures according to the 1991 census with the minority highlighted.

The Muslim minority of Greece is the only explicitly recognized minority in Greece. It numbered 97,605 (0.91% of the population) according to the 1991 census, and unofficial estimates ranged up to 140,000 people or 1.24% of the total population, according to the United States Department of State.

Like other parts of the southern Balkans that experienced centuries of Ottoman rule, the Muslim minority of mainly Western Thrace in Northern Greece consists of several ethnic groups, some being Turkish speaking and some Bulgarian-speaking Pomaks, while others descend from Ottoman-era Greek converts to Islam and also Muslim Romas. While the legal status of the Muslim minority in Greece is enshrined in international law, namely the 1923 Treaty of Lausanne, which also governs the status of the "Greek inhabitants of Constantinople" (the only group of the indigenous Greek population in Turkey that was exempt from forced expulsion under the Convention Concerning the Exchange of Greek and Turkish Populations, along with that of the islands of Imbros and Tenedos under Article 14 of the Treaty), precise definitions pertaining thereto and scope of applicability thereof remain contested between the two countries.

== History ==
During the Ottoman period, some Muslims settled in Western Thrace, marking the birth of the Muslim minority of Greece. During the Balkan Wars and the First World War, Western Thrace, along with the rest of Northern Greece, became part of Greece and the Muslim minority remained in Western Thrace, numbering approximately 86,000 people, and consisting of three ethnic groups: the Turks (here usually referred to as Western Thrace Turks), the Pomaks (Muslim Slavs who speak Bulgarian), and the Muslim Roma. These communities as are distinct from the Ottoman-era Greek Muslims, like the Vallahades, and have their own languages and cultures. Following the Greco-Turkish War (1919–1922), in 1923 the Treaty of Lausanne was signed by Turkey, on the one side, and the Kingdom of Greece and other parties, on the other side, that provides for the status, protection, and rights of the minority.

== Status in international law, terms and definitions, statistics ==
Under the provisions of the Treaty of Lausanne, the "Moslem inhabitants of Western Thrace", also referred to as "Greek nationals of the Moslem religion established in Greek territory", and the "Greek inhabitants of Constantinople", also referred to as "Turkish nationals of the Greek Orthodox religion established in Turkish territory", were exempt from the 1923 population exchange between Greece and Turkey, when 1.3 million Anatolian Greeks or Pontic Greeks and Caucasus Greeks were required to leave Turkey, and the 400,000 Muslims outside of Thrace, the whole Turks in Greece, Cretan Turks, Cham Albanians and the Eastern-Romance speaking Muslim Megleno-Romanians (known as Karadjovalides (Turkish: Karacaovalılar) and Muslim Roma-Groups like the Sepečides Romani, were required to leave Greece, including the Muslim Greek speaking Vallahades of western Greek Macedonia. All the Greek Orthodox Christians of Turkey, also included the Turkish speaking Karamanlides would be resettled in Greece apart from the Greeks of Istanbul (Constantinople), Imbros (Gökçeada) and Tenedos (Bozcaada), and all Turks of Greece would be resettled in Turkey apart from the Muslims of Greek Thrace.

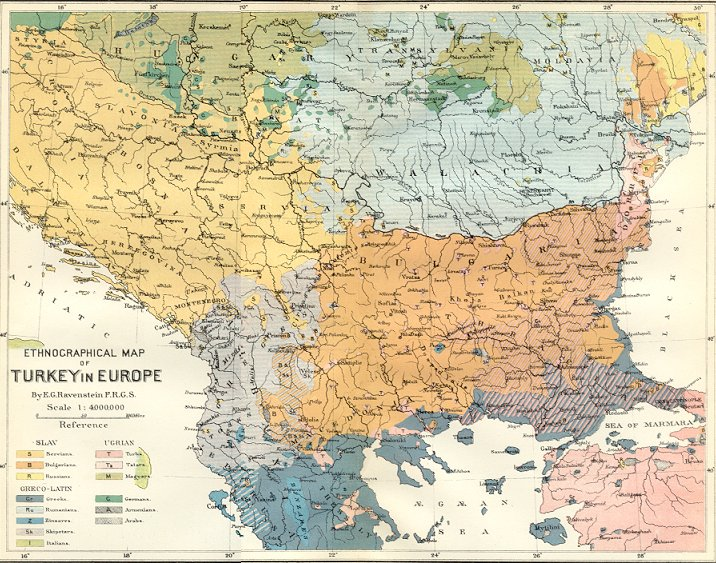
Ethnic composition of the central Balkans (including present-day Greek Thrace) in 1870.

The official Greek text of the Treaty of Lausanne refers to "muslim minorities" in article 45 However, unofficial texts of the Greek State refer to one Muslim minority. According to the Greek government, Turkish speakers form approximately 50% of the minority, Pomaks 35% and Muslim Roma 15%.

The exchanged populations were not homogenous; the Christians resettled in Greece included not only Greek speakers, but also Laz speakers, Arabic speakers and even Turkish speakers. Similarly, the Muslims resettled in Turkey included not only Turkish speakers, but also Albanians, Bulgarians, Megleno-Romanians and also Greeks like the Vallahades from western Greek Macedonia (see also Greek Muslims). This was in correspondence with the Millet system of the Ottoman Empire, where religious and national allegiance coincided, and thus Greece and Turkey were considered the parent state of each group respectively.

Today, most of the Muslim minority in Greece resides in Western Thrace, where they make up 28.88% of the population. Muslims form the largest group in the Rhodope regional unit (54.77%) and sizable percentages in the Xanthi (42.19%) and Evros regional units (6.65%). Additionally, nearly 3,500 Turks remain on the island of Rhodes and 2,000 on the island of Kos, as the islands were part of the Italian Dodecanese when the population exchange between Turkey and Greece happened (and so were not included in it). In contrast to the steady number of Greece's Muslim minority since 1923, Turkey's Greek minority has shrunk considerably due to oppression and violence orchestrated by the Turkish state in particular the 1955 Istanbul pogrom.

The minority enjoys full equality with the Greek majority, and prohibition against discrimination and freedom of religion are provided for in Article 5 and Article 13 of the Greek constitution. In Thrace today there are 3 muftis, approximately 270 imams and approximately 300 mosques.

== Applicability of Sharia law ==
The Sharia law used to be mandatory among the Muslim citizens of Greece, a situation that stems from the Ottoman era and predates its reinforcement by the 1923 Lausanne Treaty, making Greece the only country in Europe which had applied Sharia law to a section of its citizens against their wishes.

However, the European Court of Human Rights in its 2018 ruling, found unanimously that the mandatory application of Sharia law on the Muslim minority to be a violation of the European Convention on Human Rights, particularly Article 14 (prohibition of discrimination), by Greece. According to the lawyers, this was a big step since, as the minority's issues would be, from now on, judged according to the Greek law instead, which gives same rights to men and women, unlike Sharia. Later that year, the Greek government drafted a bill eliminating the mandatory enforcement of the Sharia Law, and limiting its powers, making it optional, which, according to the then PM Alexis Tsipras, "expands the equality and equity enjoyed by all Greeks without exceptions". The bill passed by the Greek Parliament and was hailed by the Muslim minority as a historic step.

== Politics ==
The minority is currently represented in the Greek parliament by PASOK-KINAL member İlhan Ahmet and independent MPs Özgür Ferhat, Ηüseyin Zeybek and Burhan Baran. During the 2002 local elections, approximately 250 Muslim municipal and prefectural councillors and mayors were elected, and the Vice-Prefect of Rhodope is also a Muslim. The main minority rights activist organization of the Turkish community within the minority is the "Turkish Minority Movement for Human and Minority Rights" (Greek: Τούρκικη Μειονοτική Κίνηση για τα Ανθρώπινα και Μειονοτικά Δικαιώματα, Toúrkiki Meionotikí Kínisi yia ta Anthrópina kai Meionotiká Dikaiómata, Turkish: İnsan ve Azınlık Hakları için Türk Azınlık Hareketi), while the Pomak community within the minority is represented by the Panhellenic Pomak Association and the Cultural Association of Pomaks of Xanthi.

== Education ==
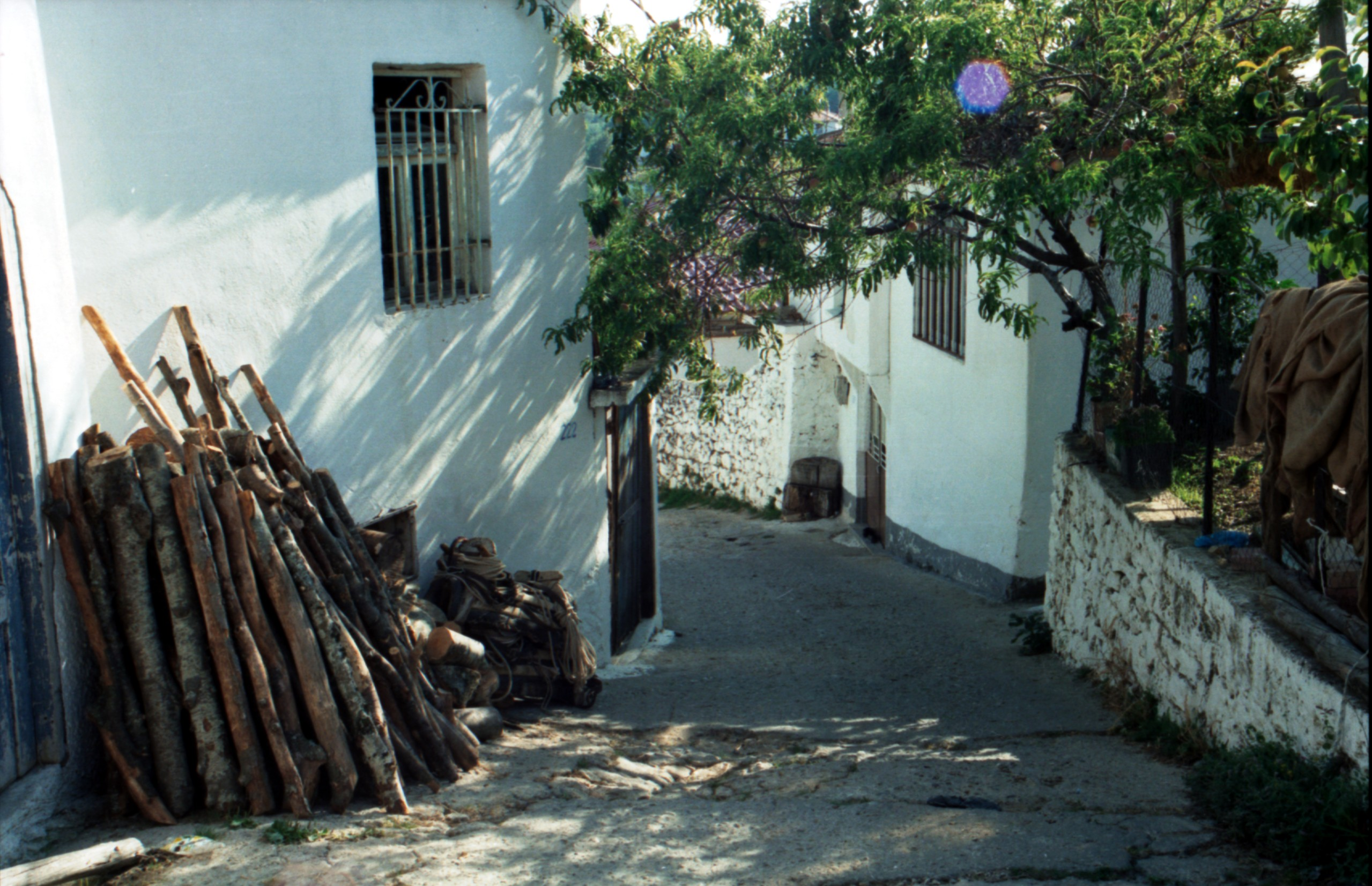
Pomak village in Xanthi regional unit.

In Thrace today there are 235 minority primary schools, where education is in the Greek and Turkish languages, and there are also two minority secondary schools, one in Xanthi and one in Komotini, where most of the minority is concentrated. In the remote mountainous areas of Xanthi where the Pomak element is dominant, the Greek government has set up Greek language secondary education schools in which religious studies is taught in Turkish and the Quran is taught in Arabic. The Pomak language (which is a dialect of Bulgarian), however, is not taught at any level of the education system. The government finances the transportation to and from the schools for students who live in remote areas, and in the academic year 1997-98, approximately 195,000 USD was spent on transportation.

There are two Islamic theological seminaries, one in Komotini, and one in Echinos (a small town in Xanthi regional unit inhabited almost exclusively by Pomaks), and under Law 2621/1998, the qualification awarded by these institutions has been recognized as equal to that of the Greek Orthodox seminaries in the country.

Finally, 0.5% of places in Greek higher education institutions are reserved for members of the minority.

All the aforementioned institutions are funded by the state.

== Issues ==
The main minority grievance regards the appointment of muftis. The Greek government started appointing muftis instead of holding elections after the death of Mufti of Komotini in 1985, although the Greek government maintained that as the practice of state-appointed muftis is widespread (including in Turkey), this practice should be adhered to in Greece, and as the muftis perform certain judicial functions in matters of family and inheritance law, the state ought to appoint them. Human Rights Watch alleges that this is against Lausanne Treaty which grants the Muslim minority the right to organize and conduct religious affairs free from government interference (although it is unclear whether issues such as inheritance law are religious matters). As such, there are two muftis for each post, one elected by the participating faithful, and one appointed by Presidential Decree. In 2018, the elected Mufti of Xanthi was Mr Aga and the government recognized one was Mr Sinikoğlu; the elected Mufti of Komotini was Mr Şerif and the government recognized one was Mr Cemali. According to the Greek government, the elections by which Mr Aga and Mr Şerif were appointed were rigged and involved very little participation from the minority. As pretension of (religious) authority is a criminal offense against the lawful muftis under the Greek Penal Code, both elected muftis were prosecuted and on conviction, both were imprisoned and fined. When, however, the case was taken to the European Court of Human Rights, the Greek government was found to have violated the right to religious freedom of Mr Aga and Mr Şerif.

Another controversial issue was Article 19 of the Greek Citizenship Code, which allowed the government to revoke the citizenship of non-ethnic Greeks who left the country. According to official statistics 46,638 Muslims (most of them being of Turkish origin) from Thrace and the Dodecanese islands lost their citizenships from 1955 to 1998, until the law was non-retroactively abolished in 1998.

The final controversial issue is the use of the ethnic terms "Turk" and "Turkish" when describing the religious minority in Western Thrace as a whole. Although the Treaty of Lausanne refers to it in a religious context, as the Muslim minority of Greece, its precise identity is in contention between the minority's individual groups, Greece and Turkey. The Turkish government insists that all the Muslims are ethnically Turks, with Turkish officials characterizing them collectively as "Turkish minority". The Greek government however refrains from referring to the Muslim minority by a specific ethnic background, such as Turkish, since it is a multi-ethnic minority that includes ethnic Greek Muslims, Pomaks and Roma Muslims as well. The "Panhellenic Pomak Association" and the "Cultural Association of Pomaks of Xanthi", have stated that Greece's Pomaks and Romas do not accept the Turkish government's characterization as "Turkish" for them, since they are self-identifying as ethnic groups distinct from the Turks; the latter also asserted that they have Greek national consciousness. These arguments between Turkey, Greece and parts of Greece's minority have territorial overtones, since the self-identity of the Muslims in Western Thrace could conceivably support territorial claims to the Greek region by Turkey. A number of organizations which are doing so, including the "Turkish Union of Xanthi", have been banned for using those terms in their title. A decision of the European Court of Human Rights in 2008 convicted Greece of violating the freedom of association and ruled the re-legalization of the association. However, the Greek authorities refused to re-legalize it.

== See also ==
- Greek Muslims
- Minorities in Greece
- Demographics of Greece
- Turks of Western Thrace
- Turks of the Dodecanese
- Provisional Government of Western Thrace
- Pomaks
- Republic of Tamrash
- Romani people
- Treaty of Lausanne
- 1990 Komotini events
