= Turkey in NATO =

Turkey–NATO relations
- NATO: Turkey

Turkey has been a member of NATO since 1952, has its second largest army and is the host of the Allied Land Command headquarters. The Incirlik and Konya Airbases have both been involved in several NATO military operations since their establishment. The current ambassador to NATO is Zeki Levent Gümrükçü.

Turkey's actions under Erdogan's administration have caused friction within NATO. Controversies include its acquisition of Russian S-400 missile systems (which led to US sanctions and removal from the F-35 program) alongside independent military operations in Libya and Syria and aggressive rhetoric toward another NATO member: Greece. It has been argued that Turkey's democratic backsliding would prevent it from qualifying for NATO membership if it were applying to join the alliance today.

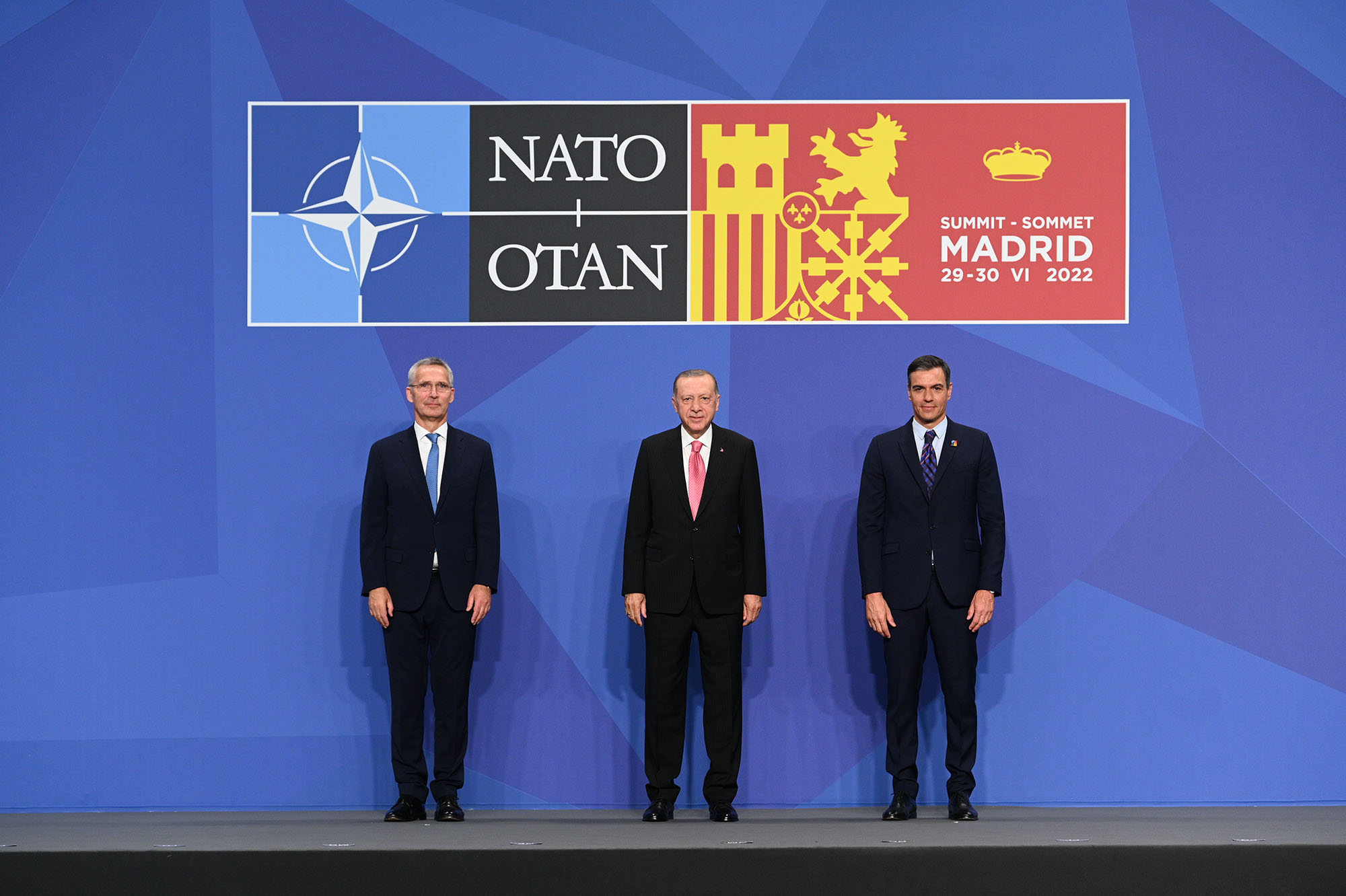
NATO Secretary General Jens Stoltenberg with Turkish President Recep Tayyip Erdoğan and Spanish Prime Minister Pedro Sánchez at the 2022 NATO summit in Madrid, Spain 29 June 2022

== Background ==
Turkey sought NATO membership to secure guarantees against potential invasion by the Soviet Union, which made several overtures towards control of the Straits of the Dardanelles. In March 1945, the Soviets terminated the Treaty of Friendship and Non Aggression to which the Soviet Union and Turkey had agreed in 1925. In June 1945, the Soviet Union demanded the establishment of Soviet bases on the Straits in exchange for a reinstatement of this treaty. The Turkish President İsmet İnönü and the Speaker of the Parliament responded decisively, avowing Turkey's readiness to defend itself.

== Accession ==
In 1948, Turkey began indicating its desire for NATO membership, and throughout 1948 and 1949 American officials responded negatively towards Turkish requests for inclusion. In May 1950, during İsmet İnönü's presidency, Turkey made its first formal accession bid, which was denied by the NATO member states. In August the same year and just days after Turkey pledged a Turkish contingent for the Korean War, a second bid was made. After the Under Secretary of State Dean Acheson coordinated with France and the United Kingdom in September 1950, the NATO command invited both Greece and Turkey to present their plans for an eventual defense cooperation. Turkey acceded, but expressed disappointment that full membership within NATO was not considered. When US bureaucrat George McGhee visited Turkey in February 1951, Turkish president Celal Bayar emphasized that Turkey expected a full membership, particularly after sending troops to the Korean War. Turkey wanted a security guarantee in case a conflict with the Soviet Union arose. After further evaluations taken at the NATO headquarters and by officials of the Central Intelligence Agency (CIA) and the US Military, it was decided in May 1951 to offer Turkey full membership. The potential role Turkey could play in a war against the Soviet Union was seen as important for NATO. Throughout 1951, the US worked on convincing its fellow NATO allies of the advantages of Turkey's and Greece's membership within the alliance. In February 1952, Bayar signed the document confirming its accession.

== NATO military bases in Turkey ==
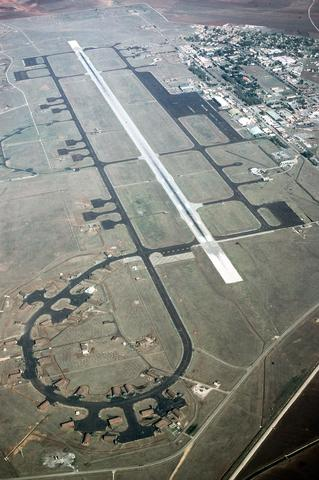
Incirlik Air Base in 1987

Incirlik air base has been a military air base since the 1950s and since then has gained more and more importance. It was built between 1951 and 1952 by US military contractors and has been in operation since 1955. In the base are stationed an estimated 50 nuclear weapons. The Konya airbase was established in 1983 and hosts AWACS surveillance jets for NATO. Since December 2012, the headquarters of NATO Land Forces has been located in Buca near İzmir on the Aegean Sea. The Allied Air Command for Southern Europe was also based in Buca between 2004 and 2013. Since 2012, the Kürecik radar station located about 500 km from Iran, is in service as part of the NATO missile defence system.

== NATO cooperation ==
=== Korea ===
The first military deployment in view to NATO was in the Korean War from July 1950 onwards. Turkey deployed 4500 soldiers to the United Nations Command in support of the South Koreans. The Turkish soldiers left a good impression with their American allies, who awarded them with the Distinguished Unit Citation. While Turkey was not a member of NATO at the time, the troops were pledged in view of a potential NATO membership.

=== Afghanistan ===
Between 2001 and 2021, Turkey sent troops to NATO's involvement in Afghanistan. First into the International Security Assistance Force (ISAF) until 2014 and then also to the Resolute Support Mission between 2020 and 2021. After an agreement between the United States and the Taliban for a withdrawal of US and NATO troops, they left from May 2021 onwards.

=== Syria ===
After the Syrian Civil War erupted, Turkey was provided with NATO assistance consisting of a Patriot air defense system in December 2012. The US sent two batteries and 400 soldiers while Germany and the Netherlands pledged modern weaponry for the system, meant against potential missiles strikes from Syria. Turkey also demanded a no-fly zone in Syria, but this was not considered by NATO. The Netherlands withdrew their support in January 2015 and Germany and the United States the same year in August.

=== Operation Active Endeavour ===
After terrorist attacks against the Twin Towers on 11 September 2001, NATO launched Operation Active Endeavour in the Mediterranean Sea to monitor the maritime traffic. The Turkish navy participated in this operation.

== Balkan Pact ==
The formation of the Balkan Pact (1953) in 1954 by Turkey, Greece and Yugoslavia was initially objected to by Italy, who demanded that NATO be consulted, before other NATO members make new military agreements with Non-NATO countries. But the other members did not see this as necessary and the agreement was signed in Bled, in present-day Slovenia in August 1954.

== Relations with NATO member states ==
=== Greece ===
Greece and Turkey entered the coalition together in 1952. Over the Cyprus dispute with Turkey, Greece's involvement in NATO diminished gradually, as in 1964 Greece withdrew troops, and in 1974, the year of the Turkish invasion of Cyprus, it also withdrew from the military wing of NATO deeming it not worthy to exist if it could not find a solution to this conflict. In 1980 Greece returned. Turkey later saw allowing this to happen as a mistake, as Erdogan accused Greece of giving refuge to "terrorists".

Despite both being NATO members, Greece and Turkey have repeatedly clashed over maritime boundaries, airspace violations, energy exploration rights in the Eastern Mediterranean, and sovereignty claims in the Aegean Sea, with periodic crises bringing the two nations to the brink of military confrontation, most recently in 2020. Analysts have warned that unresolved Greek-Turkish tensions have the potential to disrupt NATO unity.

Relations began to thaw following the devastating February 2023 earthquakes in Turkey, when Greece was among the first countries to offer assistance. After both leaders secured re-election in mid-2023, Mitsotakis and Erdoğan met on the sidelines of the NATO summit in Vilnius in July 2023 and agreed to resume talks and confidence-building measures, hailing a new "positive climate". On 7 December 2023, Erdoğan visited Athens — his first such visit in six years — where the two sides signed fifteen bilateral agreements including the Athens Declaration, a nonbinding political document committing both countries to fostering good neighbourly relations. Mitsotakis visited Ankara in May 2024 for further talks, and the two sides have continued diplomatic engagement since.

In April 2025, Greece and Turkey concluded a fresh round of bilateral military confidence-building measure (CBM) talks in Thessaloniki, involving senior diplomats, military officers, and defence officials. The delegations reviewed existing CBMs and agreed on a roadmap for 2026, covering areas such as military-to-military contacts, direct communication lines between ministers, joint disaster response exercises, and environmental cooperation.

=== United States ===
The United States is an important NATO ally with over a thousand military personnel stationed in Turkey. The North Atlantic Treaty Regarding the Status of Their Forces (SOFA) signed in 1952 and 1954 also granted NATO the right to build facilities in Turkey such as the Incirlik air base. As after the Turkish invasion of Cyprus in 1974, the US imposed a weapons embargo because Turkey used military equipment produced in the US, and Turkey expelled all US military personnel except the ones involved in NATO activities. In 1978, the US lifted the weapon embargo. In 2017 Turkey objected to weapons deliveries by the US to People's Defense Units (YPG) because it would violate NATO rules.

=== France ===
As in 2019 the United States decided to withdraw from northeast Syria and make way for Turkey to invade the area despite several NATO member states being opposed to a military operation, French President Emmanuel Macron called NATO "brain-dead" as he would have preferred better cooperation between NATO allies. The Turkish military operation was directed against the Peoples Defense Units (YPG) involved in the fight against the Islamic State (IS). Macron alleged that Turkey should not expect support from NATO member states if the Turkish military operation was not halted. A diplomatic spat followed, with Recep Tayyip Erdogan asking Macron if he was brain-dead himself and France summoning the Turkish ambassador. The invasion ended after the Vice President of the United States came to an agreement with Turkey for a ceasefire in order to keep US troops involved in the fight against the Islamic state in safety. In May 2022, when Turkey discussed the possibility of an additional incursion, the United States again warned against such an undertaking.

=== Baltic defense plan ===
NATO established a plan to defend the Baltic states after the Russian annexation of the Crimea in 2014. The plan was dubbed Eagle Defender, but was not implemented at the time due to Turkish objections. Turkey wanted NATO officials to classify the People's Defense Units (YPG) as a terrorist organization in exchange for its approval for the plan. In July 2020, Turkey withdrew its objection, and Eagle Defender was able to come into practice.

=== Finnish and Swedish accession bids ===
When Finland and Sweden decided to apply to join NATO in May 2022, Turkey was the only NATO member to oppose their membership, due to their concerns that the countries were harboring of Kurdistan Workers' Party (PKK), Democratic Union Party (Syria) (PYD), People's Defense Units (YPG) and of Gülen movement members that Turkey sees as terrorists. On 18 May 2022, Turkey blocked the start of accession negotiations for Finland and Sweden to NATO. Turkish Foreign Minister Mevlüt Çavuşoğlu demanded that Finland and Sweden adapt their laws, if this had to be done in order to address Turkish security concerns. Diplomats of the two Nordic countries arrived in Ankara to negotiate, but the conclusions were not to the satisfaction of Erdogan, who was offended by the fact that the Syrian Kurdish politician Salih Muslim was seen on Sveriges Television the same day Nordic diplomats were in Ankara to negotiate. Nationalist Movement Party (MHP) leader Devlet Bahçeli suggested that a scenario in which Turkey would leave NATO should be considered an option. In late May 2022, opposition leader Kemal Kiliçdaroglu argued that if the accession row persisted, AKP and MHP would decide to close the Incirlik Airbase, the Republican People's Party (CHP) would also support it. On 28 June 2022, during the NATO summit in Madrid, a tripartite memorandum was signed between Finland, Sweden and Turkey, paving the way for accession negotiations with Finland and Sweden to join NATO. On the same day, Turkey agreed to support the accession bids of Finland and Sweden.

On 30 June 2022, Turkish President Recep Tayyip Erdoğan announced that the accession protocols of Finland and Sweden would not be approved in the Turkish Grand National Assembly if the necessary conditions of the tripartite memorandum are not met. Finland eventually received Turkey's approval on the 30 March 2023, but Sweden did not. On 1 April 2023, Erdoğan signed and approved the proposal containing Finland's accession protocol. Just prior to the NATO summit in Vilnius in July 2023, Erdoğan linked Sweden's accession to NATO membership to Turkey's application for EU membership. Turkey had applied for EU membership in 1999, but talks made little progress since 2016. At the NATO summit in Vilnius on 10 July 2023, Turkey agreed to support Sweden's accession bid. Kurdish political parties in Turkey, the Peoples' Democratic Party (HDP), abstained from voting on Finland's membership in March 2023, and the Peoples' Equality and Democracy Party (DEM) abstained and voted against Sweden's membership in January 2024. On 23 January 2024, the Turkish Parliament accepted Sweden's accession bid with a vote of 287 in favor, 55 against and 4 abstained. On 25 January 2024, Erdoğan signed and approved the proposal containing Sweden's accession protocol.

== Bilateral visits ==
NATO Secretary General Jens Stoltenberg met with Turkish President Recep Tayyip Erdoğan, Turkish Foreign Minister Mevlüt Çavuşoğlu and Turkish Defense Minister Hulusi Akar in Istanbul on 3–5 November 2022 to hold talks regarding the membership of Finland and Sweden. On 25 November 2024, NATO Secretary General Mark Rutte met with Turkish President Recep Tayyip Erdoğan, Turkish Foreign Minister Hakan Fidan and Turkish Defense Minister Yaşar Güler in Ankara.

== Controversy ==
Turkey's actions over the past decade have sparked significant controversy within NATO. Key points of contention include its purchase of Russian S-400 air defense systems, sustained energy and economic ties with Russia and China, independent military operations in Syria and Iraq, and military threats against NATO members and allies. These actions have consistently caused friction and raised concerns among other NATO members and allies due to Turkey's violations of NATO's principles.

In December 2020, the Trump administration imposed sanctions on Turkey due to its acquisition of the Russian S-400 missile system. This $2.5 billion deal, brokered in 2017 between Turkish President Recep Tayyip Erdoğan and Russian President Vladimir Putin, was viewed as a threat to NATO's security and the operational integrity of the F-35 program. Despite repeated US offers to sell the Patriot missile system instead, Turkey proceeded with the S-400 purchase, resulting in its removal from the F-35 program and the imposition of sanctions under the Countering America's Adversaries Through Sanctions Act. The sanctions targeted Turkey's Presidency of Defense Industries and its top officials, freezing assets and imposing visa restrictions.

In December 2022, Erdoğan threatened to strike the Greek capital of Athens with ballistic missiles. In a speech, he revealed that Turkey had begun producing its own short-range ballistic missiles, which he claimed were "frightening the Greeks." Erdogan stated, "(The Greeks) say 'It can hit Athens.' Of course, it will. If you don't stay calm, if you try to buy things from the United States and other places (to arm) the islands, a country like Turkey ... has to do something." In response, Greek Foreign Minister Nikos Dendias condemned the threats, describing them as "unacceptable and universally condemnable" and likened Erdogan's behavior to "North Korean attitudes." Dendias emphasized that such actions should not be part of NATO.

In July 2024, Erdoğan threatened to invade Israel, stating that Turkey might intervene as it had previously done in Libya and Nagorno-Karabakh. Erdoğan's threats, which followed a series of anti-Israel comments made by him in the past, came during a speech praising Turkey's defense industry and amidst escalating tensions between Israel and Hezbollah. Dutch politician Geert Wilders condemned Erdoğan's statements and called for Turkey's removal from NATO. Again in 2025, then Erdoğan called for Israel to be destroyed. Israel's Foreign Minister Gideon Sa'ar responded and said that “the dictator has revealed his antisemitic face.

In July 2026, foreign policy analyst Steven A. Cook wrote that "If Turkey wanted to become a member of NATO now instead of in 1952, it would not meet the criteria on democracy, rule of law, and human rights." However, Portugal was a founding member of NATO under dictatorship of António de Oliveira Salazar.

== Turkey's foreign relations with NATO member states ==
- Albania
- Belgium
- Bulgaria
- Canada
- Croatia
- Czech Republic
- Denmark
- Estonia
- Finland
- France
- Germany
- Greece
- Hungary
- Iceland
- Italy
- Latvia
- Lithuania
- Luxembourg
- Montenegro
- Netherlands
- North Macedonia
- Norway
- Poland
- Portugal
- Romania
- Slovakia
- Slovenia
- Spain
- Sweden
- United Kingdom
- United States

== See also ==
- Foreign relations of Turkey
- Foreign relations of NATO
- European Union–Turkey relations
- Russia–Turkey relations
- Turkey–United States relations
- European Union–NATO relations
- Finland–Turkey relations
- Sweden–Turkey relations
- List of permanent representatives of Turkey to NATO
