= Potential accession of Turkey to the European Union =

Process of Turkey joining the EU

Process of potential accession of Turkey to the European Union
- Status: Frozen negotiations
Application
Membership application	14 April 1987
Screened & negotiations commence
Negotiations
Chapters closed	3% complete
Memberships & Treaties
Association Agreement
Economic and monetary policy
Travel
Energy
Foreign and military policy
North Atlantic Treaty Organization (NATO)	Turkey became a member of NATO on 18 February 1952
Organization for Security and Co-operation in Europe (OSCE)	Member since 25 June 1973
Human rights and international courts
Council of Europe (CoE)	Turkey became a member of the Council of Europe on 13 April 1950
International Criminal Court (ICC)	Turkey is not a party to the Rome Statute, the founding treaty of the International Criminal Court
International Court of Justice (ICJ)
Impact (27+1)
Population	446,828,803	527,863,413 (+18.70%)
Area	4,233,262 km^{2} 1,634,472 mi^{2}	5,164,938 (+17.88%)
HDI	0.896
GDP (PPP)	$25.399 trillion
GDP per capita (PPP)	$56,928
GDP	$17.818 trillion	20,253 (+13.90%)
GDP per capita	$39,940
Gini	30.0
Official Languages	24	25; Turkish ▲ +1

The potential accession of Turkey to the European Union (EU) is on the agenda for future enlargement of the EU.

Turkey is negotiating its accession to the European Union (EU) as a member state, following its application to become a full member of the European Economic Community (EEC), the predecessor of the EU, on 14 April 1987.

After the ten founding members in 1949, Turkey became one of the first new members (the 13th member) of the Council of Europe in 1950. The country became an associate member of the European Economic Community (EEC) in 1963 and was an associate member of the Western European Union from 1992 to its end in 2011. Turkey signed a Customs Union agreement with the EU in 1995 and was officially recognised as a candidate for full membership on 12 December 1999, at the Helsinki summit of the European Council.

Negotiations for full membership were started on 3 October 2005. Progress was slow: out of the 35 chapters necessary to complete the accession process, only 16 had been opened and one had been closed by May 2016. The early 2016 refugee deal between Turkey and the European Union was intended to accelerate negotiations after previous stagnation and allow visa-free travel through Europe for Turks.

Since 2016, accession negotiations have stalled. The EU has accused and criticized Turkey for human rights violations and deficits in rule of law. In 2017, EU officials said that the strong presidency created by the 2017 Turkish constitutional referendum would violate the Copenhagen criteria of eligibility for an EU membership.

On 20 February 2019, a European Parliament committee voted to call for suspension of the accession talks, sparking criticism from the government of Turkey. Turkey's accession negotiations have effectively come to a standstill and no further chapters can be considered for opening or closing and no further work towards the modernisation of the EU-Turkey Customs Union is foreseen.

On 30 January 2023, the main opposition alliance Nation Alliance in Turkey released a memorandum of understanding for common policies. It re-affirmed the opposition's intent to continue the EU accession talks if they were to be elected in that year's elections. CHP leader and Turkey's main opposition leader Özgür Özel announced that if he wins the next Turkish general elections, his country will rapidly continue its accession negotiations with the EU and his country will become a member of the EU as soon as possible. It is one of nine current EU candidate countries, together with Albania, Bosnia and Herzegovina, Georgia, Moldova, Montenegro, North Macedonia, Serbia, and Ukraine.

== History ==
=== Background ===
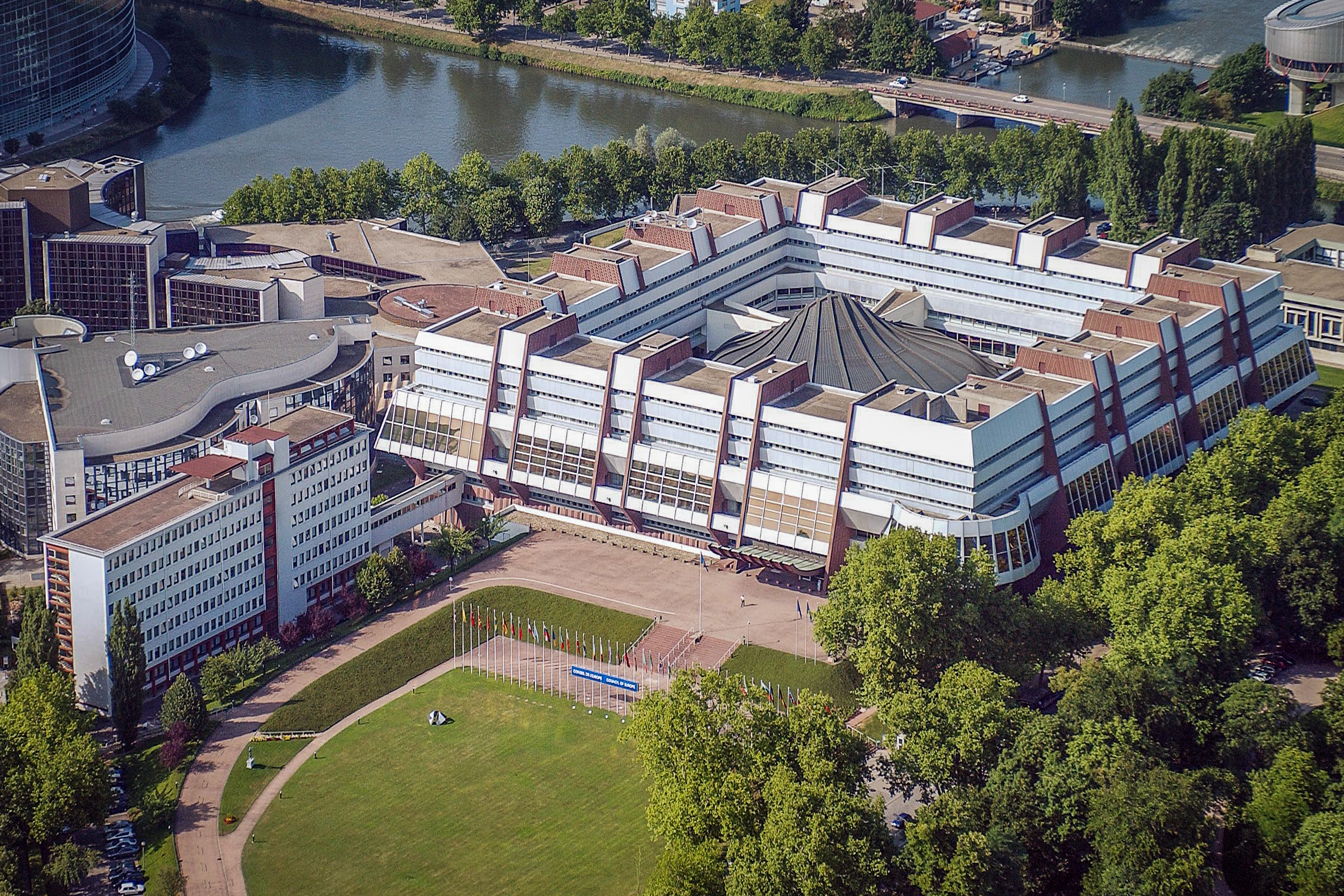
Palace of Europe in Strasbourg, seat of the Council of Europe, which Turkey joined on 13 April 1950

After the Ottoman Empire's collapse following World War I, Turkish revolutionaries led by Mustafa Kemal Atatürk emerged victorious in the Turkish War of Independence, establishing the modern Turkish Republic as it exists today. Atatürk, President of Turkey, implemented a series of reforms, including secularisation and industrialisation, intended to "Europeanise" or Westernise the country. During World War II, Turkey remained neutral until February 1945, when it joined the Allies. The country took part in the Marshall Plan of 1947, became a member of the Council of Europe in 1950, and a member of NATO in 1952. During the Cold War, Turkey allied itself with the United States and Western Europe. The Turkish position vis-à-vis Europe has been characterized as "Europe has been an object of desire as well as a source of frustration for Turkish national identity in a long and strained history".

=== Brief history of major events ===
Timeline
Date	Event
14 April 1987	Turkey applied for membership to join the European Economic Community (now the European Union).
13 December 1997	Luxembourg Council declares Turkey eligible to become an EU member.
11 December 1999	Helsinki Summit European Council declares Turkey a candidate country.
24 March 2001	Council adopts Accession Partnership for Turkey.
3 August 2002	The Turkish parliament abolished the death penalty to pave the way for the start of EU accession negotiations.
19 May 2003	Council adopts revised Accession Partnership for Turkey.
16 December 2004	European Council declares that Turkey sufficiently fulfils the criteria for opening accession negotiations beginning in October 2005.
3 October 2005	Council adopts negotiating framework and negotiations are formally opened. Screening process begins.
1 June 2006	Negotiations are opened and closed on Chapter 25 – Science and Research.
11 December 2006	Because Turkey refused to apply to Cyprus the Additional Protocol to the Ankara Agreement, Council decides that eight chapters will not be opened. Main article: Cyprus dispute
19 February 2008	Council adopts revised Accession Partnership for Turkey.
30 June 2010	Negotiations are opened on Chapter 12 – Food Safety, Veterinary and Phytosanitary Policy.
17 May 2012	Positive Agenda intended to bring fresh dynamics into the EU-Turkey relations was launched.
5 November 2013	Negotiations are opened on Chapter 22 – Regional Policy and Coordination of Structural Instruments.
16 December 2013	Visa liberalisation dialogue launched and EU-Turkey Readmission Agreement signed.
29 November 2015	First EU-Turkey Summit held and Joint EU-Turkey Action Plan activated. The EU welcomes Turkey's commitment to accelerate the fulfilment of the Visa Roadmap benchmarks in return for halting the flow of Syrian refugees from Turkey to Greece.
14 December 2015	Negotiations are opened on Chapter 17 – Economic and Monetary Policy.
30 June 2016	Negotiations are opened on Chapter 33 – Financial and Budgetary Provisions.
24 November 2016	MEPs vote overwhelmingly to suspend negotiations with Turkey over human rights and rule of law concerns.
6 July 2017	EU parliament called for the suspension of accession negotiations with Turkey.
20 February 2019	EU parliament committee votes to suspend accession talks with Turkey.
13 March 2019	The European Parliament unanimously accepted the call for the suspension of full membership negotiations between the EU and Turkey.
19 May 2021	The European Parliament unanimously accepted the call for the suspension of accession negotiations between the EU and Turkey.

=== 1950s–1990s ===
Turkey first applied for associate membership in the European Economic Community in 1959, and on 12 September 1963 signed the "Agreement Creating An Association Between The Republic of Turkey and the European Economic Community", also known as the Ankara Agreement. This agreement came into effect the following year on 12 December 1964. The Ankara Agreement sought to integrate Turkey into a customs union with the EEC whilst acknowledging the final goal of membership. In November 1970, a further protocol called the "Additional Protocol" established a timetable for the abolition of tariffs and quotas on goods traded between Turkey and the EEC.

On 14 April 1987, Turkey submitted its application for formal membership into the European Economic Community. The European Commission responded in December 1989 by confirming Ankara's eventual membership but also by deferring the matter to more favourable times, citing Turkey's economic and political situation, as well its poor relations with Greece and the conflict with Cyprus as creating an unfavourable environment with which to begin negotiations. This position was confirmed again in the Luxembourg European Council of 1997 in which accession talks were started with central and eastern European states and Cyprus, but not Turkey. During the 1990s, Turkey proceeded with closer integration with the European Union by agreeing to a customs union in 1995. In 1999, following the Greek-Turkish earthquake diplomacy, Greece lifted its opposition to Turkey's accession to the European Union. Moreover, the Helsinki Summit European Council of 1999 proved a milestone as the EU recognised Turkey as a candidate on equal footing with other potential candidates.

=== 2000s ===
The next significant step in EU–Turkey relations came with the December 2002 Copenhagen European Council. According to it, "the EU would open negotiations with Turkey 'without delay' if the European Council in December 2004, on the basis of a report and a recommendation from the Commission, decides that Turkey fulfills the Copenhagen political criteria." French President Jacques Chirac and German Chancellor Gerhard Schröder expressed joint support for the December 2004 European Commission summit meeting agenda for Turkey joining the European Union. On 28 September 2005, the European Parliament unanimously adopted a preliminary invitation to start EU accession negotiations with Turkey. The invitation included a call for Turkey to formally recognize the Armenian genocide and to formally recognize the Republic of Cyprus and establish diplomatic relations. The European Commission recommended that the negotiations should begin in 2005, but also added various precautionary measures. The EU leaders agreed on 16 December 2004 to start accession negotiations with Turkey from 3 October 2005. While Austria and Germany initially wanted to leave open the possibility that negotiations with Turkey would lead to a privileged partnership, less than full membership, accession negotiations were ultimately launched with the "shared objective" of membership.

Turkey's accession talks have since been stalled by a number of domestic and external problems. Both Austria and France have said they would hold a referendum on Turkey's accession. In the case of France, a change in its Constitution was made to impose such a referendum, but later another constitutional change has enabled the parliament (if a large majority of its members agrees) to prevent such a referendum. The issue of Cyprus continues to be a major obstacle to negotiations. European officials have commented on the slowdown in Turkish reforms which, combined with the Cyprus problem, led the EU's Enlargement Commissioner Olli Rehn in March 2007 to warn of an impending 'train crash' in the negotiations. Due to these setbacks, negotiations again came to a halt in December 2006, with the EU freezing talks in 8 of the 35 key areas under negotiation.

In 2007, Turkey stated that they were aiming to comply with EU law by 2013, but Brussels refused to back that as a deadline for membership. In 2006 President of the European Commission José Manuel Barroso said that the accession process will take at least until 2021. In a visit to Germany on 31 October 2012, Turkish Prime Minister Recep Tayyip Erdoğan made clear that Turkey was expecting membership in the Union to be realised by 2023, the 100th Anniversary of the Turkish Republic, implying that they could end membership negotiations if the talks had not yielded a positive result by then. Turkish President Abdullah Gül said that upon completing the accession process Turkey will hold a referendum for Turkish membership in the European Union.

In December 2009, EU member the Republic of Cyprus blocked 6 chapters of Turkish accession negotiations, including those on Judiciary and Fundamental Rights, Energy and Education and Culture, arguing that Turkey needs to first normalise relations with Cyprus. As a result, no chapters have been opened since June 2010. Hence, there is no chapter Turkey could open other than the difficult and economically detrimental chapters Competition Policy, Social Policy and Employment, and Public Procurement that most candidate countries open at the end of accession as all other chapters were blocked. In February 2013, Turkish Deputy Undersecretary of the Ministry for EU Affairs, Burak Erdenir, claimed that the EU had yet to communicate to Turkey the benchmark criteria for opening chapters 23 and 24, Judiciary & Fundamental Rights and Justice, Freedom & Security, which was to be done after screening of the chapters was completed in 2006, thus making it impossible to comply with them. He also suggested this was a deliberate attempt to slow their accession process.

=== Positive agenda (2012–13) ===
After over two years of no chapter openings, the European Commission set up a "Positive Agenda" designed to focus on common EU-Turkey interests. EU Commissioner for expansion Stefan Füle describes that the goal was "to keep the accession process alive and put it properly back on track after a period of stagnation which has been a source of frustration for both sides." The EU Commission mentioned a broad range of areas as the main elements of the Agenda such as "intensified dialogue and cooperation on political reforms", "visa", "mobility and migration", "energy", "fight against terrorism", "further participation of Turkey in Community programmes", "town twinning", "trade and the Customs Union" and "supporting efforts to align with the acquis, including on chapters where accession negotiations cannot be opened for the time being". The proposal was considered favorably on the condition that it serves as an instrument in support of and complementary to the negotiation process with the EU.

In the framework of "Positive Agenda", Working Groups were established on 8 chapters ("3-Right of Establishment and Freedom to Provide Services", "6-Company Law", "10-Information Society and Media", "18-Statistics", "23-Judiciary and Fundamental Rights", "24-Justice, Freedom and Security", "28-Consumer and Health Protection", and "32-Financial Control"). The "Positive Agenda" kick-off meeting was held on 17 May 2012 in Ankara with the participation of Stefan Füle, EU Commissioner for Enlargement and European Neighbourhood Policy. As a result of the Working Groups meetings held so far, a total of four closing benchmarks were confirmed to have been met by Turkey in three chapters (Company Law, Consumer and Health Protection as well as Financial Control chapters).

On 20 June 2013, in the wake of Ankara's crackdown on mass demonstrations in Taksim Square, Germany blocked the start to new EU accession talks with Turkey. According to the Financial Times, one Turkish official said that such a move could potentially break off political relations with the bloc.

A Eurobarometer poll which included EU countries and candidate countries as well, showed that 43% of Turks viewed the EU positively, as compared with 60% six months previously. In the same poll, 29% of Turks polled expressed support for an EU Constitution, the lowest level of support among EU countries and candidates polled. Germany said that its reservation stems from a technical issue, but then-Chancellor Angela Merkel, an opponent of Turkish entry into the EU, described herself as "shocked" after Ankara's use of overwhelming police force against mostly peaceful demonstrators. France stated that they would not waive their veto over unfreezing four accession chapters with Turkey until after the elections for the European Parliament in June 2014.

=== Stalled talks (2016–present) ===
EU–Turkey relations have deteriorated following President Erdoğan's crackdown on supporters of the 2016 Turkish coup d'état attempt. While Erdoğan stated that he approved the reintroduction of the death penalty to punish those involved in the coup, the EU announced that it strongly condemned the coup attempt and would officially end accession negotiations with Turkey if the death penalty was reintroduced. On 25 July 2016, President of the European Commission Jean-Claude Juncker said that Turkey was not in a position to become a member of the European Union in the near future and that accession negotiations between the EU and Turkey would be stopped immediately if the death penalty was brought back. Erdoğan stated in November 2016 that he was considering putting Turkey's continued negotiations with the EU on membership to a referendum in 2017. In November 2016, the European Parliament voted in favour of a non-binding resolution to request that the European Commission temporarily suspend membership negotiations due to the "disproportionate repressive measures" of the government to the coup. On 13 December, the European Council (comprising the heads of state or government of the member states) resolved that it would open no new areas in Turkey's membership talks in the "prevailing circumstances"; Turkey's path toward autocratic rule makes progress on EU accession impossible. In 2016, EU member Austria opposed Turkey's EU membership.

In April 2017, the Parliamentary Assembly of the Council of Europe (PACE) voted to reopen its monitoring procedure against Turkey. This vote is widely understood to deal a major blow to Turkey's prospect of eventual EU membership, as exiting that process was made a precondition of EU accession negotiations back in 2004. In June 2017, members of the European Parliament expressed that the strong presidency created by the 2017 Turkish constitutional referendum violate the Copenhagen criteria of eligibility for an EU membership. On 6 July 2017, the European Parliament approved a resolution calling for the suspension of full membership negotiations between the EU and Turkey.

The European Commission's long-term budget proposal for the 2021–2027 period released in May 2018 included pre-accession funding for a Western Balkan Strategy for further enlargement, but omitted Turkey.

In March 2018, Austrian Chancellor Sebastian Kurz opposed Turkey's EU accession talks and urged it to halt membership talks. On 26 June 2018, the EU's General Affairs Council stated that "the Council notes that Turkey has been moving further away from the European Union. Turkey's accession negotiations have therefore effectively come to a standstill and no further chapters can be considered for opening or closing and no further work towards the modernisation of the EU-Turkey Customs Union is foreseen." The Council added that it is "especially concerned about the continuing and deeply worrying backsliding on the rule of law and on fundamental rights including the freedom of expression."

On 20 February 2019, the European Parliament Committee on Foreign Affairs called on the Commission and the Council to officially suspend the accession negotiations with Turkey, sparking criticism from the government of Turkey. On 13 March 2019, plenary session of the European Parliament unanimously approved the committee's proposed resolution. On 19 May 2021, the European Parliament reiterated the call for suspension of accession talks. In July 2023, Turkish President Recep Tayyip Erdoğan brought up Turkey's EU membership application during a NATO summit in Vilnius, linking it to Sweden's accession to NATO. According to Dagens Nyheter's data, in September 2023, 60% of Swedes said that Sweden opposes Turkey's EU membership and will not support the membership process, while 7% said that Sweden does not oppose Turkey's EU membership and will support the membership process.

== Negotiation progress ==
=== Table of chapters ===
Screening, chapter, clusters, & freezing dates
Acquis chapter	Screening started	Screening completed	Cluster Opened	Chapter Opened	Chapter frozen	Chapter unfrozen	Cluster Closed	Chapter Closed
1. Free Movement of Goods	16 January 2006	24 February 2006	–	–	11 December 2006 (Note: The EU Council froze the opening of eight chapters over Turkey's rejection to open its ports and airports to traffic from Cyprus in 2006)	–	–	–
2. Freedom of Movement For Workers	19 July 2006	11 September 2006	–	–	8 December 2009 (Note: Some of the chapters do not proceed to the next stage in the process, because they are blocked by Cyprus.)	–	–	–
3. Right of Establishment & Freedom To Provide Services	21 November 2005	20 December 2005	–	–	11 December 2006	–	–	–
4. Free Movement of Capital	25 November 2005	22 December 2005	–	19 December 2008	–	–	–	–
5. Public Procurement	7 November 2005	28 November 2005	–	–	–	–	–	–
6. Company Law	21 June 2006	20 July 2006	–	17 June 2008	–	–	–	–
7. Intellectual Property Law	6 February 2006	3 March 2006	–	17 June 2008	–	–	–	–
8. Competition Policy	8 November 2005	2 December 2005	–	–	–	–	–	–
9. Financial Services	29 March 2006	3 May 2006	–	–	11 December 2006	–	–	–
10. Information Society & Media	12 June 2006	14 July 2006	–	19 December 2008	–	–	–	–
11. Agriculture & Rural Development	5 December 2005	26 January 2006	–	–	11 December 2006 (Note: France blocked some chapters from proceeding to the next stage of the process, but subsequently lifted their veto.)	–	–	–
12. Food Safety, Veterinary & Phytosanitary Policy	9 March 2006	28 April 2006	–	30 June 2010	–	–	–	–
13. Fisheries	24 February 2006	31 March 2006	–	–	11 December 2006	–	–	–
14. Transport Policy	26 June 2006	28 September 2006	–	–	11 December 2006	–	–	–
15. Energy	15 May 2006	16 June 2006	–	–	8 December 2009	–	–	–
16. Taxation	6 June 2006	12 July 2006	–	30 June 2009	–	–	–	–
17. Economic & Monetary Policy	16 February 2006	23 March 2006	–	14 December 2015	25 June 2007	14 December 2015	–	–
18. Statistics	19 June 2006	18 July 2006	–	25 June 2007	–	–	–	–
19. Social Policy & Employment	8 February 2006	22 March 2006	–	–	–	–	–	–
20. Enterprise & Industrial Policy	27 March 2006	5 May 2006	–	29 March 2007	–	–	–	–
21. Trans-European Networks	30 June 2006	29 September 2006	–	19 December 2007	–	–	–	–
22. Regional Policy & Coordination of Structural Instruments	11 September 2006	10 October 2006	–	5 November 2013	25 June 2007	12 February 2013	–	–
23. Judiciary & Fundamental Rights	7 September 2006	13 October 2006	–	–	8 December 2009	–	–	–
24. Justice, Freedom & Security	23 January 2006	15 February 2006	–	–	8 December 2009	–	–	–
25. Science & Research	20 October 2005	14 November 2005	–	12 June 2006	–	–	–	12 June 2006
26. Education & Culture	26 October 2005	16 November 2005	–	–	8 December 2009	–	–	–
27. Environment & Climate Change	3 April 2006	2 June 2006	–	–	21 December 2009	–	–	–
28. Consumer & Health Protection	8 June 2006	11 July 2006	–	–	19 December 2007	–	–	–
29. Customs Union	31 January 2006	14 March 2006	–	–	11 December 2006	–	–	–
30. External Relations	10 July 2006	13 September 2006	–	11 December 2006	–	–	–	–
31. Foreign, Security & Defence Policy	14 September 2006	6 October 2006	–	–	8 December 2009	–	–	–
32. Financial Control	18 May 2006	30 June 2006	–	26 July 2007	–	–	–	–
33. Financial & Budgetary Provisions	6 September 2006	4 October 2006	–	30 June 2016	25 June 2007	18 March 2016	–	–
34. Institutions	–	–	–	–	–	–	–	–
35. Other Issues	–	–	–	–	–	–	–	–
Progress	33 of 33	33 of 33	0 of 13	16 of 33	17 of 33	3 of 17	0 of 33	1 of 13

=== Report history for Turkey's ability to assume the obligations of EU membership ===
November 2026 European Commission Report
Acquis chapter	Status as of November 2026	Chapter Status as of November 2026
Overview	3 chapters in early stage, 9 chapters with some level of preparation, 12 chapters with a moderate level of preparation, 6 chapters with a good level of preparation, 3 chapters with a well advanced level of preparation	15 frozen chapters, 3 unopened chapters, 14 open chapters, 1 closed chapter
1. Free Movement of Goods	Good level of preparation	Chapter frozen
2. Freedom of Movement For Workers	Early stage	Chapter frozen
3. Right of Establishment & Freedom To Provide Services	Early stage	Chapter frozen
4. Free Movement of Capital	Moderately prepared	Chapter open
5. Public Procurement	Moderately prepared	Chapter unopened
6. Company Law	Well advanced	Chapter open
7. Intellectual Property Law	Good level of preparation	Chapter open
8. Competition Policy	Some level of preparation	Chapter unopened
9. Financial Services	Good level of preparation	Chapter frozen
10. Information Society & Media	Some level of preparation	Chapter open
11. Agriculture & Rural Development	Some level of preparation	Chapter frozen
12. Food Safety, Veterinary & Phytosanitary Policy	Some level of preparation	Chapter open
13. Fisheries	Moderately prepared	Chapter frozen
14. Transport Policy	Moderately prepared	Chapter frozen
15. Energy	Moderately prepared	Chapter frozen
16. Taxation	Moderately prepared	Chapter open
17. Economic & Monetary Policy	Some level of preparation	Chapter open
18. Statistics	Moderately prepared	Chapter open
19. Social Policy & Employment	Some level of preparation	Chapter unopened
20. Enterprise & Industrial Policy	Moderately prepared	Chapter open
21. Trans-European Networks	Well advanced	Chapter open
22. Regional Policy & Coordination of Structural Instruments	Moderately prepared	Chapter open
23. Judiciary & Fundamental Rights	Early stage	Chapter frozen
24. Justice, Freedom & Security	Moderately prepared	Chapter frozen
25. Science & Research	Well advanced	Chapter closed
26. Education & Culture	Moderately prepared	Chapter frozen
27. Environment & Climate Change	Some level of preparation	Chapter frozen
28. Consumer & Health Protection	Good level of preparation	Chapter frozen
29. Customs Union	Good level of preparation	Chapter frozen
30. External Relations	Moderately prepared	Chapter open
31. Foreign, Security & Defence Policy	Some level of preparation	Chapter frozen
32. Financial Control	Good level of preparation	Chapter open
33. Financial & Budgetary Provisions	Some level of preparation	Chapter open
34. Institutions	Nothing to adopt	Nothing to adopt
35. Other Issues	Nothing to adopt	Nothing to adopt
Legend: Well advanced Good / Well advanced Good level of preparation Moderate / Good Moderately prepared Some / Moderate Some level of preparation Early stage / Some Early stage

Report history 2003–2004
totally incompatible early stage considerable efforts needed some level of preparation further efforts needed moderately advanced good level of preparation advanced well advanced † This chart does not indicate chapters which have been provisionally closed and/or chapters which have been frozen. ‡ Prior to the 2004 enlargement of the European Union, there were thirty-one chapters of the acquis communautaire.
Acquis chapter	2003	2004
1. Free Movement of Goods	Considerable efforts needed	Considerable efforts needed
2. Freedom Movement of Persons	Considerable efforts needed	Early stage
3. Freedom to Provide Services	Considerable efforts needed	Considerable efforts needed
4. Free Movement of Capital	Further efforts needed	Considerable efforts needed
5. Company Law	Early stage	Considerable efforts needed
6. Competition Policy	Further efforts needed	Further efforts needed
7. Agriculture	Further efforts needed	Considerable efforts needed
8. Fisheries	Considerable efforts needed	Considerable efforts needed
9. Transport Policy	Early stage	Considerable efforts needed
10. Taxation	Further efforts needed	Considerable efforts needed
11. Economic and Monetary Union	Early stage	Considerable efforts needed
12. Statistics	Further efforts needed	Considerable efforts needed
13. Social Policy and Employment	Considerable efforts needed	Considerable efforts needed
14. Energy	Further efforts needed	Further efforts needed
15. Industrial Policy	Further efforts needed	Moderately advanced
16. Small and Medium-sized Companies	Further efforts needed	Moderately advanced
17. Science and Research	Further efforts needed	Further efforts needed
18. Education and Training	Moderately advanced	Further efforts needed
19. Telecommunication and Information Technologies	Considerable efforts needed	Moderately advanced
20. Culture and Audio-visual Policy	Considerable efforts needed	Considerable efforts needed
21. Regional Policy and Coordination of Structural Instruments	Considerable efforts needed	Considerable efforts needed
22. Environment	Considerable efforts needed	Early stage
23. Consumer and Health Protection	Moderately advanced	Further efforts needed
24. Cooperation in the Field of Justice and Home Affairs	Further efforts needed	Further efforts needed
25. Customs Union	Moderately advanced	Moderately advanced
26. External Relations	Moderately advanced	Moderately advanced
27. Common Foreign and Security Policy	Moderately advanced	Moderately advanced
28. Financial Control	Further efforts needed	Considerable efforts needed
29. Financial and Budgetary Provisions	Further efforts needed	Further efforts needed
30. Institutions	Further efforts needed	Further efforts needed
31. Others	Further efforts needed	Further efforts needed
totally incompatible early stage considerable efforts needed some level of preparation further efforts needed moderately advanced good level of preparation advanced well advanced † This chart does not indicate chapters which have been provisionally closed and/or chapters which have been frozen. ‡ Prior to the 2004 enlargement of the European Union there were thirty-one chapters of the acquis communautaire.

Report history 2005–2026
totally incompatible early stage considerable efforts needed some level of preparation further efforts needed moderately advanced good level of preparation advanced well advanced † This chart does not indicate chapters which have been provisionally closed and/or chapters which have been frozen. ‡ After the 2004 enlargement of the European Union four more chapters were added and/or restructured, bringing the total number of acquis communautaire chapters to 35.
Clusters	Acquis chapter	2005	2006	2007	2008	2009	2010	2011	2012	2013	2014	2015	2016	2018	2019	2020	2021	2022	2023	2024	2025	2026
Cluster 1: Fundamentals	23. Judiciary and Fundamental Rights	Further efforts needed	Considerable efforts needed	Considerable efforts needed	Further efforts needed	Further efforts needed	Further efforts needed	Further efforts needed	Further efforts needed	Further efforts needed	Further efforts needed	Some level of preparation	Some level of preparation	Early stage	Early stage	Early stage	Early stage	Early stage	Early stage	Early stage	Early stage	Early stage
Cluster 1: Fundamentals	24. Justice, Freedom, and Security	Further efforts needed	Considerable efforts needed	Further efforts needed	Further efforts needed	Further efforts needed	Further efforts needed	Further efforts needed	Early stage	Early stage	Moderately advanced	Moderately advanced	Moderately advanced	Moderately advanced	Moderately advanced	Moderately advanced	Moderately advanced	Moderately advanced	Moderately advanced	Moderately advanced	Moderately advanced	Moderately advanced
Cluster 1: Fundamentals	5. Public Procurement	Further efforts needed	Considerable efforts needed	Further efforts needed	Considerable efforts needed	Considerable efforts needed	Considerable efforts needed	Considerable efforts needed	Moderately advanced	Moderately advanced	Moderately advanced	Moderately advanced	Moderately advanced	Moderately advanced	Moderately advanced	Moderately advanced	Moderately advanced	Moderately advanced	Moderately advanced	Moderately advanced	Moderately advanced	Moderately advanced
Cluster 1: Fundamentals	18. Statistics	Considerable efforts needed	Some level of preparation	Moderately advanced	Further efforts needed	Further efforts needed	Advanced	Advanced	Good level of preparation	Advanced	Advanced	Moderately advanced	Moderately advanced	Moderately advanced	Moderately advanced	Moderately advanced	Moderately advanced	Moderately advanced	Moderately advanced	Moderately advanced	Moderately advanced	Moderately advanced
Cluster 1: Fundamentals	32. Financial Control	Further efforts needed	Further efforts needed	Further efforts needed	Moderately advanced	Moderately advanced	Further efforts needed	Further efforts needed	Moderately advanced	Good level of preparation	Moderately advanced	Good level of preparation	Good level of preparation	Good level of preparation	Good level of preparation	Good level of preparation	Good level of preparation	Good level of preparation	Good level of preparation	Good level of preparation	Good level of preparation	Good level of preparation
Cluster 2: Internal Market	1. Free Movement of Goods	Considerable efforts needed	Considerable efforts needed	Moderately advanced	Moderately advanced	Moderately advanced	Moderately advanced	Moderately advanced	Advanced	Advanced	Advanced	Good level of preparation	Good level of preparation	Good level of preparation	Good level of preparation	Good level of preparation	Good level of preparation	Good level of preparation	Good level of preparation	Good level of preparation	Good level of preparation	Good level of preparation
Cluster 2: Internal Market	2. Freedom of Movement for Workers	Early stage	Early stage	Early stage	Early stage	Early stage	Early stage	Early stage	Early stage	Early stage	Early stage	Early stage	Early stage	Early stage	Early stage	Early stage	Early stage	Early stage	Early stage	Early stage	Early stage	Early stage
Cluster 2: Internal Market	3. Right of Establishment and Freedom to Provide Services	Considerable efforts needed	Considerable efforts needed	Considerable efforts needed	Early stage	Early stage	Early stage	Early stage	Early stage	Early stage	Early stage	Early stage	Early stage	Early stage	Early stage	Early stage	Early stage	Early stage	Early stage	Early stage	Early stage	Early stage
Cluster 2: Internal Market	4. Free Movement of Capital	Further efforts needed	Considerable efforts needed	Further efforts needed	Further efforts needed	Further efforts needed	Further efforts needed	Further efforts needed	Early stage	Early stage	Moderately advanced	Moderately advanced	Moderately advanced	Moderately advanced	Moderately advanced	Moderately advanced	Moderately advanced	Moderately advanced	Moderately advanced	Moderately advanced	Moderately advanced	Moderately advanced
Cluster 2: Internal Market	6. Company Law	Further efforts needed	Further efforts needed	Considerable efforts needed	Moderately advanced	Moderately advanced	Further efforts needed	Further efforts needed	Moderately advanced	Well advanced	Well advanced	Well advanced	Well advanced	Well advanced	Well advanced	Well advanced	Well advanced	Well advanced	Well advanced	Well advanced	Well advanced	Well advanced
Cluster 2: Internal Market	7. Intellectual Property Law	Further efforts needed	Moderately advanced	Early stage	Moderately advanced	Moderately advanced	Moderately advanced	Further efforts needed	Further efforts needed	Advanced	Advanced	Good level of preparation	Good level of preparation	Good level of preparation	Good level of preparation	Good level of preparation	Good level of preparation	Good level of preparation	Good level of preparation	Good level of preparation	Good level of preparation	Good level of preparation
Cluster 2: Internal Market	8. Competition Policy	Further efforts needed	Further efforts needed	Further efforts needed	Moderately advanced	Moderately advanced	Moderately advanced	Further efforts needed	Further efforts needed	Moderately advanced	Moderately advanced	Moderately advanced	Some level of preparation	Some level of preparation	Some level of preparation	Some level of preparation	Some level of preparation	Some level of preparation	Some level of preparation	Some level of preparation	Some level of preparation	Some level of preparation
Cluster 2: Internal Market	9. Financial Services	Further efforts needed	Further efforts needed	Moderately advanced	Moderately advanced	Further efforts needed	Further efforts needed	Further efforts needed	Good level of preparation	Advanced	Advanced	Good level of preparation	Good level of preparation	Good level of preparation	Good level of preparation	Good level of preparation	Good level of preparation	Good level of preparation	Good level of preparation	Good level of preparation	Good level of preparation	Good level of preparation
Cluster 2: Internal Market	28. Consumer and Health Protection	Further efforts needed	Further efforts needed	Further efforts needed	Further efforts needed	Further efforts needed	Moderately advanced	Further efforts needed	Good level of preparation	Good level of preparation	Good level of preparation	Good level of preparation	Good level of preparation	Good level of preparation	Good level of preparation	Good level of preparation	Good level of preparation	Good level of preparation	Good level of preparation	Good level of preparation	Good level of preparation	Good level of preparation
Cluster 3: Competitiveness and inclusive growth	10. Information Society and Media	Considerable efforts needed	Considerable efforts needed	Considerable efforts needed	Considerable efforts needed	Considerable efforts needed	Further efforts needed	Further efforts needed	Moderately advanced	Moderately advanced	Moderately advanced	Moderately advanced	Moderately advanced	Some level of preparation	Some level of preparation	Some level of preparation	Some level of preparation	Some level of preparation	Some level of preparation	Some level of preparation	Some level of preparation	Some level of preparation
Cluster 3: Competitiveness and inclusive growth	16. Taxation	Further efforts needed	Further efforts needed	Further efforts needed	Further efforts needed	Further efforts needed	Moderately advanced	Moderately advanced	Moderately advanced	Moderately advanced	Moderately advanced	Moderately advanced	Moderately advanced	Moderately advanced	Moderately advanced	Moderately advanced	Moderately advanced	Moderately advanced	Moderately advanced	Moderately advanced	Moderately advanced	Moderately advanced
Cluster 3: Competitiveness and inclusive growth	17. Economic and Monetary Policy	Considerable efforts needed	Further efforts needed	Moderately advanced	Further efforts needed	Further efforts needed	Moderately advanced	Moderately advanced	Advanced	Advanced	Advanced	Moderately advanced	Moderately advanced	Moderately advanced	Moderately advanced	Moderately advanced	Some level of preparation	Some level of preparation	Some level of preparation	Some level of preparation	Some level of preparation	Some level of preparation
Cluster 3: Competitiveness and inclusive growth	19. Social Policy and Employment	Further efforts needed	Further efforts needed	Further efforts needed	Further efforts needed	Further efforts needed	Further efforts needed	Further efforts needed	Moderately advanced	Moderately advanced	Moderately advanced	Moderately advanced	Moderately advanced	Some level of preparation	Some level of preparation	Some level of preparation	Some level of preparation	Some level of preparation	Some level of preparation	Some level of preparation	Some level of preparation	Some level of preparation
Cluster 3: Competitiveness and inclusive growth	20. Enterprise and Industrial Policy	Further efforts needed	Moderately advanced	Moderately advanced	Moderately advanced	Moderately advanced	Moderately advanced	Advanced	Good level of preparation	Moderately advanced	Advanced	Good level of preparation	Good level of preparation	Good level of preparation	Good level of preparation	Good level of preparation	Moderately advanced	Moderately advanced	Moderately advanced	Moderately advanced	Moderately advanced	Moderately advanced
Cluster 3: Competitiveness and inclusive growth	25. Science and Research	Further efforts needed	Well advanced	Well advanced	Well advanced	Well advanced	Well advanced	Well advanced	Well advanced	Well advanced	Well advanced	Well advanced	Well advanced	Well advanced	Well advanced	Well advanced	Well advanced	Well advanced	Well advanced	Well advanced	Well advanced	Well advanced
Cluster 3: Competitiveness and inclusive growth	26. Education and Culture	Further efforts needed	Well advanced	Further efforts needed	Further efforts needed	Further efforts needed	Further efforts needed	Well advanced	Moderately advanced	Further efforts needed	Moderately advanced	Moderately advanced	Moderately advanced	Moderately advanced	Moderately advanced	Moderately advanced	Moderately advanced	Moderately advanced	Moderately advanced	Moderately advanced	Moderately advanced	Moderately advanced
Cluster 3: Competitiveness and inclusive growth	29. Customs Union	Moderately advanced	Moderately advanced	Moderately advanced	Further efforts needed	Further efforts needed	Further efforts needed	Further efforts needed	Advanced	Advanced	Advanced	Good level of preparation	Some level of preparation	Good level of preparation	Good level of preparation	Good level of preparation	Good level of preparation	Good level of preparation	Good level of preparation	Good level of preparation	Good level of preparation	Good level of preparation
Cluster 4: Green Agenda and Sustainable Connectivity	14. Transport Policy	Further efforts needed	Further efforts needed	Further efforts needed	Moderately advanced	Further efforts needed	Further efforts needed	Moderately advanced	Moderately advanced	Moderately advanced	Moderately advanced	Moderately advanced	Moderately advanced	Moderately advanced	Moderately advanced	Moderately advanced	Moderately advanced	Moderately advanced	Moderately advanced	Moderately advanced	Moderately advanced	Moderately advanced
Cluster 4: Green Agenda and Sustainable Connectivity	15. Energy	Further efforts needed	Considerable efforts needed	Further efforts needed	Further efforts needed	Further efforts needed	Further efforts needed	Further efforts needed	Moderately advanced	Moderately advanced	Advanced	Moderately advanced	Moderately advanced	Moderately advanced	Moderately advanced	Moderately advanced	Moderately advanced	Moderately advanced	Moderately advanced	Moderately advanced	Moderately advanced	Moderately advanced
Cluster 4: Green Agenda and Sustainable Connectivity	21. Trans-European Networks	Early stage	Early stage	Further efforts needed	Further efforts needed	Further efforts needed	Advanced	Further efforts needed	Advanced	Moderately advanced	Advanced	Well advanced	Well advanced	Well advanced	Well advanced	Well advanced	Well advanced	Well advanced	Well advanced	Well advanced	Well advanced	Well advanced
Cluster 4: Green Agenda and Sustainable Connectivity	27. Environment and Climate Change	Early stage	Early stage	Considerable efforts needed	Considerable efforts needed	Considerable efforts needed	Considerable efforts needed	Early stage	Early stage	Early stage	Early stage	Moderately advanced	Some level of preparation	Some level of preparation	Some level of preparation	Some level of preparation	Some level of preparation	Some level of preparation	Some level of preparation	Some level of preparation	Some level of preparation	Some level of preparation
Cluster 5: Resources, Agriculture and Cohesion	11. Agriculture and Rural Development	Considerable efforts needed	Early stage	Early stage	Early stage	Considerable efforts needed	Further efforts needed	Considerable efforts needed	Considerable efforts needed	Moderately advanced	Early stage	Some level of preparation	Some level of preparation	Some level of preparation	Some level of preparation	Some level of preparation	Some level of preparation	Some level of preparation	Some level of preparation	Some level of preparation	Some level of preparation	Some level of preparation
Cluster 5: Resources, Agriculture and Cohesion	12. Food Safety, Veterinary, and Phytosanitary Policy	Considerable efforts needed	Considerable efforts needed	Considerable efforts needed	Considerable efforts needed	Early stage	Further efforts needed	Considerable efforts needed	Early stage	Moderately advanced	Early stage	Some level of preparation	Some level of preparation	Some level of preparation	Some level of preparation	Some level of preparation	Some level of preparation	Some level of preparation	Some level of preparation	Some level of preparation	Some level of preparation	Some level of preparation
Cluster 5: Resources, Agriculture and Cohesion	13. Fisheries	Early stage	Early stage	Considerable efforts needed	Considerable efforts needed	Early stage	Further efforts needed	Considerable efforts needed	Considerable efforts needed	Early stage	Early stage	Early stage	Early stage	Early stage	Early stage	Some level of preparation	Some level of preparation	Moderately advanced	Moderately advanced	Moderately advanced	Moderately advanced	Moderately advanced
Cluster 5: Resources, Agriculture and Cohesion	22. Regional Policy and Coordination of Structural Instruments	Considerable efforts needed	Moderately advanced	Considerable efforts needed	Considerable efforts needed	Further efforts needed	Further efforts needed	Further efforts needed	Further efforts needed	Moderately advanced	Moderately advanced	Moderately advanced	Moderately advanced	Moderately advanced	Moderately advanced	Moderately advanced	Moderately advanced	Moderately advanced	Moderately advanced	Moderately advanced	Moderately advanced	Moderately advanced
Cluster 5: Resources, Agriculture and Cohesion	33. Financial and Budgetary Provisions	Further efforts needed	Further efforts needed	Further efforts needed	Early stage	Early stage	Early stage	Early stage	Early stage	Early stage	Early stage	Early stage	Some level of preparation	Some level of preparation	Some level of preparation	Some level of preparation	Some level of preparation	Some level of preparation	Some level of preparation	Some level of preparation	Some level of preparation	Some level of preparation
Cluster 6: External Relations	30. External Relations	Further efforts needed	Further efforts needed	Further efforts needed	Moderately advanced	Moderately advanced	Further efforts needed	Moderately advanced	Good level of preparation	Good level of preparation	Advanced	Good level of preparation	Good level of preparation	Moderately advanced	Moderately advanced	Moderately advanced	Moderately advanced	Moderately advanced	Moderately advanced	Moderately advanced	Moderately advanced	Moderately advanced
Cluster 6: External Relations	31. Foreign, Security, and Defence Policy	Further efforts needed	Further efforts needed	Further efforts needed	Further efforts needed	Further efforts needed	Further efforts needed	Further efforts needed	Moderately advanced	Moderately advanced	Moderately advanced	Moderately advanced	Moderately advanced	Moderately advanced	Moderately advanced	Some level of preparation	Some level of preparation	Some level of preparation	Some level of preparation	Some level of preparation	Some level of preparation	Some level of preparation
Others	34. Institutions	Further efforts needed	Further efforts needed	Further efforts needed	Further efforts needed	Further efforts needed	Further efforts needed	Further efforts needed	Further efforts needed	Further efforts needed	Further efforts needed	Further efforts needed	Further efforts needed	Further efforts needed	Further efforts needed	Further efforts needed	Further efforts needed	Further efforts needed	Further efforts needed	Further efforts needed	Further efforts needed	Further efforts needed
Others	35. Other Issues	Further efforts needed	Further efforts needed	Further efforts needed	Further efforts needed	Further efforts needed	Further efforts needed	Further efforts needed	Further efforts needed	Further efforts needed	Further efforts needed	Further efforts needed	Further efforts needed	Further efforts needed	Further efforts needed	Further efforts needed	Further efforts needed	Further efforts needed	Further efforts needed	Further efforts needed	Further efforts needed	Further efforts needed
totally incompatible early stage considerable efforts needed some level of preparation further efforts needed moderately advanced good level of preparation advanced well advanced † This chart does not indicate chapters which have been provisionally closed and/or chapters which have been frozen. ‡ After the 2004 enlargement of the European Union, four more chapters were added and/or restructured, bringing the total number of acquis communautaire chapters to 35.																						

=== Pre-accession support to Turkey ===
The European Commission's long-term budget proposal for the 2021-2027 period released in May 2018 included pre-accession funding for a Western Balkan Strategy for further enlargement, but omitted Turkey.

== Expected impact of joining ==
=== Effect upon the EU ===
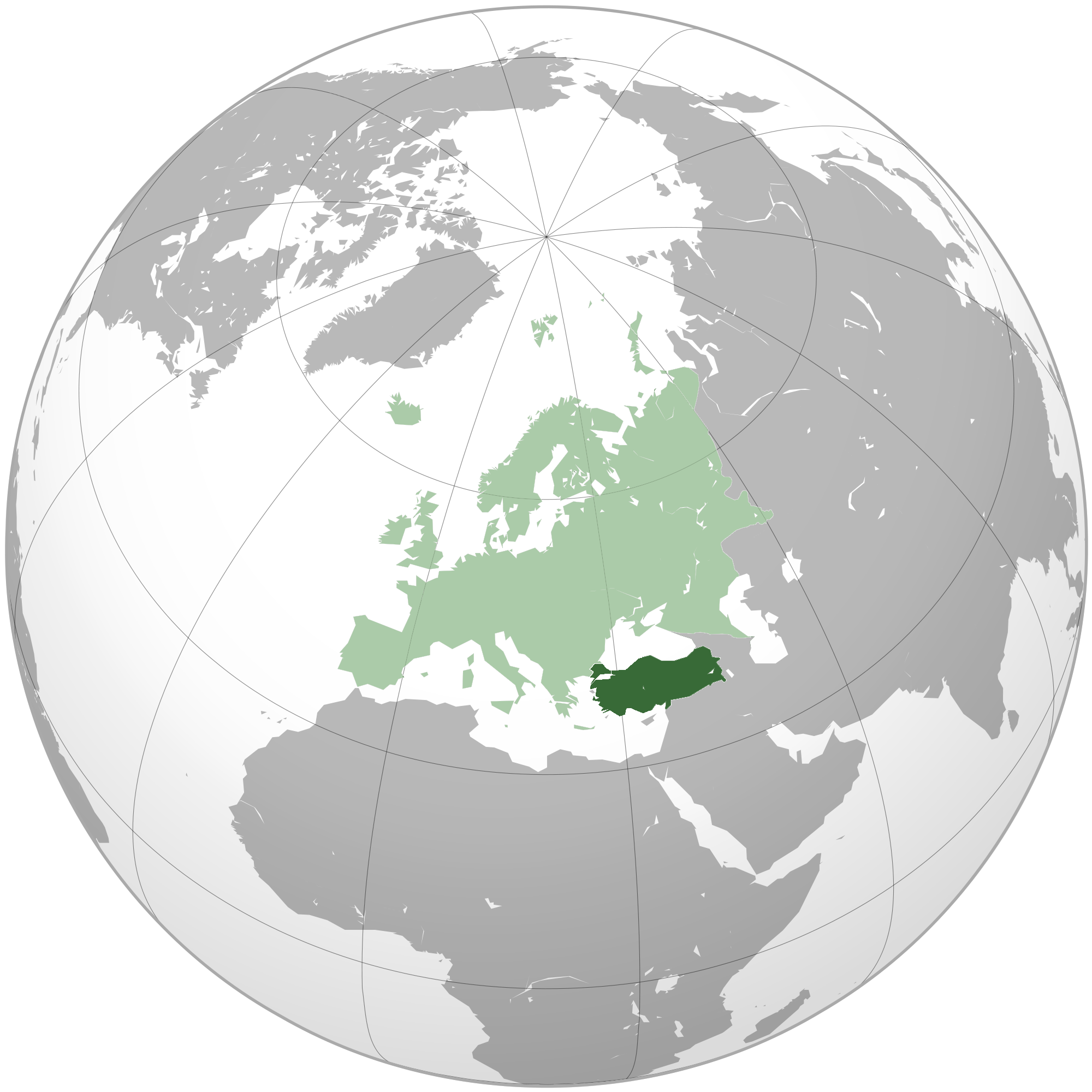
Global map of Europe (light green) and Turkey (dark green)

The problem of Turkey's membership of the EU is compounded by conflicting views as to what the EU should ultimately become. This has played a significant role in the debate, due in part to the European debt crisis and the fact that as a result of this the eurozone and the EU overall is more federalised on both fiscal, legal and political levels than it was at the time of Turkey's application or at the time that Turkey was accepted as a candidate. Generally those members of the EU who support a rights-based free trade bloc do not oppose Turkey as adamantly as those who support a broader political union. The latter, in particular, were concerned that unification would be frustrated and the European project threatened by Turkey's inclusion.

Proponents of Turkey's membership argue that Turkey's geographical location will contribute to peace. According to the Swedish foreign minister, Carl Bildt, "the accession of Turkey would give the EU a decisive role for stability in the eastern part of the Mediterranean and the Black Sea, which is clearly in the strategic interest of Europe". Poland is a key supporter for Turkey's bid to join the EU, while the United Kingdom has expressed support previously, but not since leaving the EU.

Upon joining the EU, Turkey's 83 million inhabitants would bestow the largest number of MEPs in the European Parliament. Turkey now has a larger population than Germany. However, a single country can only hold a maximum of 96 seats in the European Parliament.

The Nabucco, TANAP, TAP and ITGI pipelines will deliver natural gas from the Caspian Sea basin to the EU member states.

Turkey's membership would also affect future enlargement plans, especially the number of nations seeking EU membership, grounds on which Valéry Giscard d'Estaing has opposed Turkey's admission. Giscard has suggested that it would lead to demands for accession by Morocco. Morocco's application is already rejected for "not being a European country"; Turkey, unlike Morocco, has 3% of its territory in Europe. The vast majority of its population lives in the Asian side of the country. On the other hand, the country's largest city, Istanbul, lies mostly in Europe. Also, Cyprus, which is geographically located in Asia, joined the European Union in 2004. French President Nicolas Sarkozy stated in January 2007 that "enlarging Europe with no limit risks destroying European political union, and that I do not accept ... I want to say that Europe must give itself borders, that not all countries have a vocation to become members of Europe, beginning with Turkey which has no place inside the European Union."

EU member states must unanimously agree on Turkey's membership for the Turkish accession to be successful. A number of nations may oppose it; notably Austria; Germany (former chancellor Angela Merkel has long rejected Turkey's accession bid, and has proposed a "privileged partnership" instead); and France (where some are anxious at the prospect of a new wave of Muslim immigrants, given the country's already large Muslim community).

Negotiations to remove the French constitutional requirement for a compulsory referendum on all EU accessions after Croatia resulted in a new proposal to require a compulsory referendum on the accession of any country with a population of more than 5% of the EU's total population; this clause would mainly apply to Turkey and Ukraine.

The current situation according to the French constitution is as follows: if 3/5 of the delegates (from the Senate and the Parliament) agree to the accession of Turkey, there will be no referendum.

=== Benefits to Turkey ===
Upon accession to the EU, Turkey expects to receive economic development aid. There is also an expectation that there will be an increase in European foreign investment in the Turkish economy, further driving economic growth. During potential economic crisis events, Turkey could benefit from EU assistance.

Free movement of people across the EU will give many Turkish people the opportunity to migrate to other parts of Europe in search of work, or a higher standard of living. The option of migration out of Turkey will inevitably ease tensions in the east of the country, as the prospect of a better standard of living will tend to cool separatist tendencies. However, there have been problems concerning irregular transit migration through Turkey to the EU.

Some secularists in Turkey envisage that the accession of Turkey will contribute to the spread of secular western values in Turkey. Conversely, some non-secularists in Turkey envisage that accession will contribute to the further growth and acceptance of Islam in Europe. The EU accession bid has stimulated Turkey's political and legal reforms and intensified the democratisation process.

Given Turkey's large and growing population, Turkey will have a correspondingly large representation in the European Parliament (2nd and equal with Germany, with 96 seats in EU parliament). This will give Turkey a strong direct influence over EU policies.

== Turkish membership issues ==
=== Economy ===
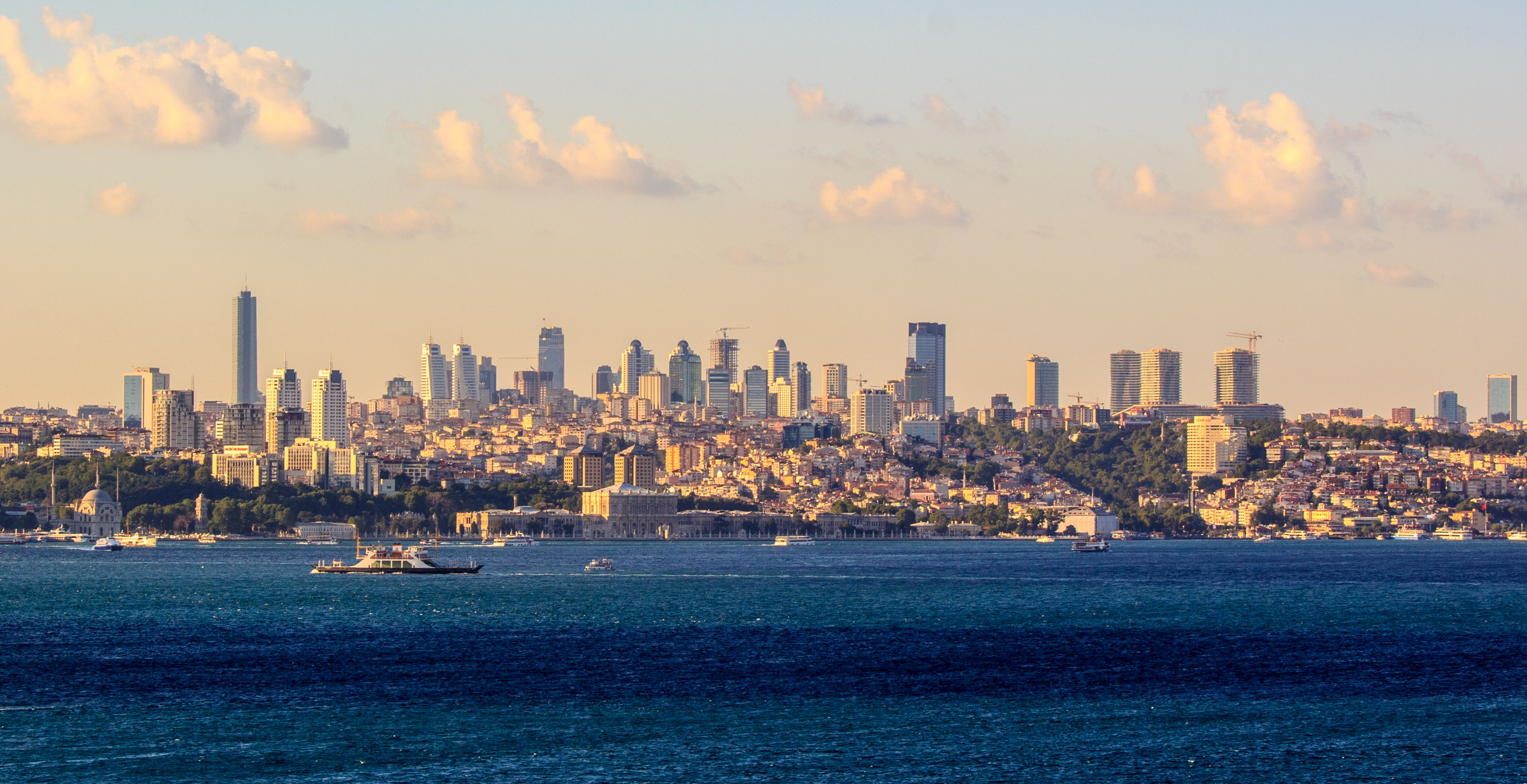
A view of Dolmabahçe Palace and the skyline of Levent business district from the Bosphorus strait in Istanbul, the largest city and economic capital of Turkey, and the former capital of the Roman (330–395), Byzantine (395–1204 and 1261–1453), Latin (1204–1261) and Ottoman (1453–1922) empires

Turkey has the world's 11th largest GDP-PPP and 17th largest Nominal GDP. The country is a founding member of the OECD and the G-20 major economies.

Beko and Vestel are among the largest producers of consumer electronics and home appliances in Europe.

Turkey has taken advantage of a customs union with the European Union, signed in 1995, to increase its industrial production destined for exports, while at the same time benefiting from EU-origin foreign investment into the country. In 2008, Turkey's exports reached US$141.8 billion (main export partners: Germany 11.2%, UK 8%, Italy 6.95%, France 5.6%, Spain 4.3%, US 3.88%; total EU exports 56.5%.) However, larger imports amounting to about US$204.8 billion threaten the balance of trade (main import partners: Russia 13.8%, Germany 10.3%, China 7.8%, Italy 6%, USA 4.8%, France 4.6%, Iran 3.9%, UK 3.2%; total EU imports 40.4%; total Asia imports 27%).

The opening of talks regarding the Economic and Monetary Policy acquis chapter of Turkey's accession bid was expected to begin in June 2007, but were stalled by France. Turkey became the European Union's fifth-largest trade partner in 2015 according to data released by Eurostat.

Turkey is set to receive EUR 9.2bn from the Instrument for Pre-Accession Assistance, a funding mechanism for EU candidate countries.

=== Population ===
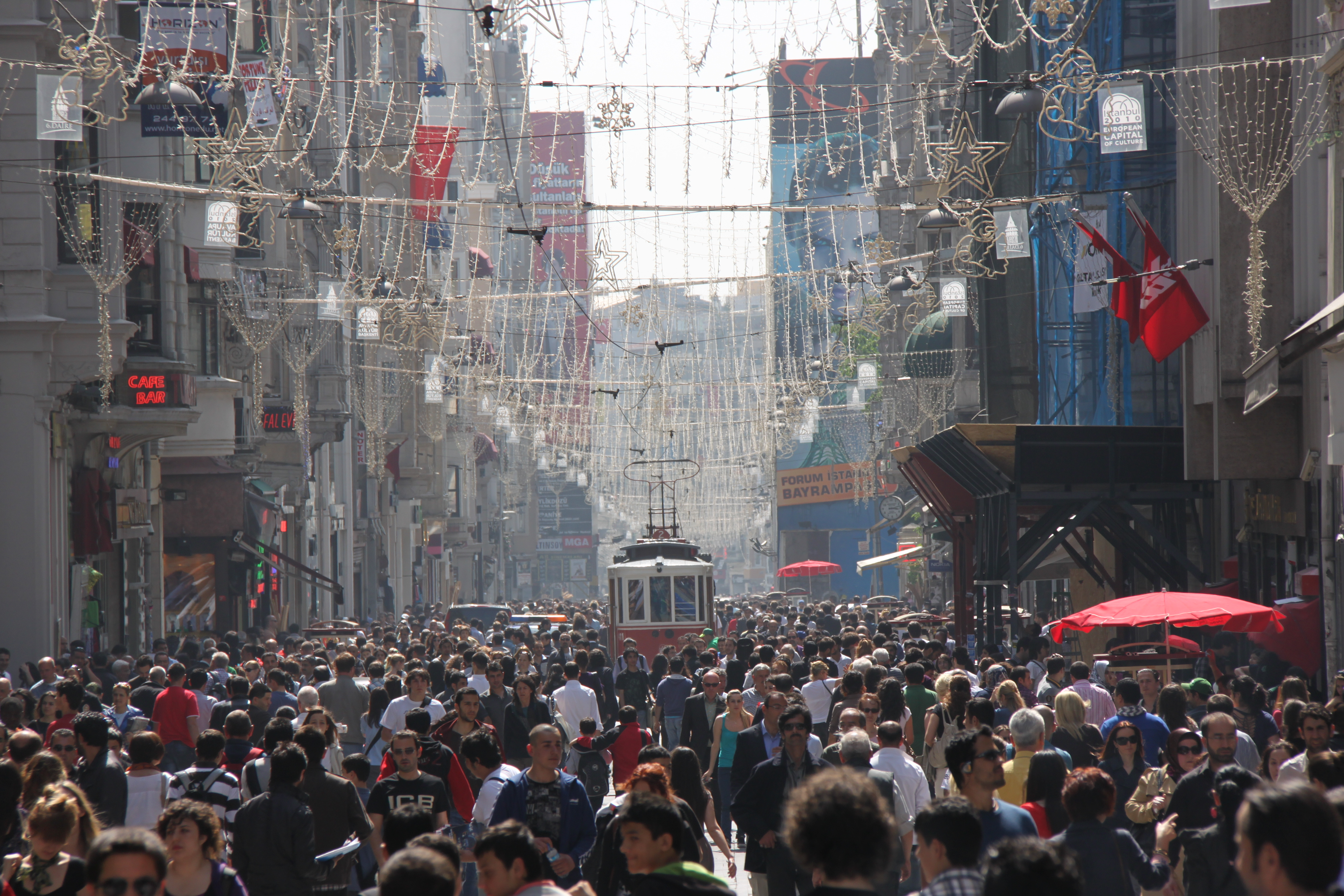
İstiklal Avenue in Istanbul's cosmopolitan Beyoğlu district is visited by an average of 3 million people on weekend days.

As of 2005, the population of Turkey stood at 71.5 million with a yearly growth rate of 1.5%. The Turkish population is relatively young, with 25.5% falling within the 0–15 age bracket. As of March 2026, the population of Turkey is approximately 87.8 million people.

Turkey's large population could alter the balance of power in the representative European institutions. Upon joining the EU, Turkey would be allocated the largest number of MEPs in the European Parliament. This is because the European Parliament distributes seats to member states according to their population. Therefore, if Turkey is admitted, it could influence the EU legislation and administration in line with its own policies.

If Turkey were to join the European Union, Istanbul would become the most populous metropolis in the EU (as of 2004).

=== Foreign relations with EU member states ===
- Austria
- Belgium
- Bulgaria
- Croatia
- Czech Republic
- Denmark
- Estonia
- Finland
- France
- Germany
- Greece
- Hungary
- (Republic of Ireland) Ireland
- Italy
- Latvia
- Lithuania
- Luxembourg
- Malta
- Netherlands
- Poland
- Portugal
- Romania
- Slovakia
- Slovenia
- Spain
- Sweden

Turkey has no diplomatic relations with Cyprus as Turkey does not recognize the government of the Republic of Cyprus.

==== Cyprus ====
Cyprus was divided when, on 20 July 1974, Turkey invaded and occupied a third of the island in response to an Athens-engineered coup aimed at annexing Cyprus to Greece. Since then, Turkey has refused to acknowledge the Republic of Cyprus (an EU member since 2004) as the sole authority on the island, and recognizes the self-declared Turkish Republic of Northern Cyprus since its establishment in 1983. The Turkish invasion in 1974 and the resulting movement of refugees along both sides of the Green Line, and the establishment of the self-declared Turkish Republic of Northern Cyprus in 1983, form the core issues which surround the ongoing Cyprus dispute.

Turkey and the Turkish Cypriots backed the 2004 Annan Plan for Cyprus aimed at the reunification of the island, but the plan was subsequently rejected by Greek Cypriots on the grounds that it did not meet their needs. According to Greek Cypriots, the latest proposal included maintained residence rights for the many Anatolian Turks who moved to Cyprus after the invasion (and their descendants who were born on the island after 1974), while the Greek Cypriots who lost their property after the Turkish invasion would be granted only a restricted right of return to the north following the island's proposed reunification. Although the outcome received much criticism in the EU as well, the Republic of Cyprus was admitted into the EU a week after the referendum.

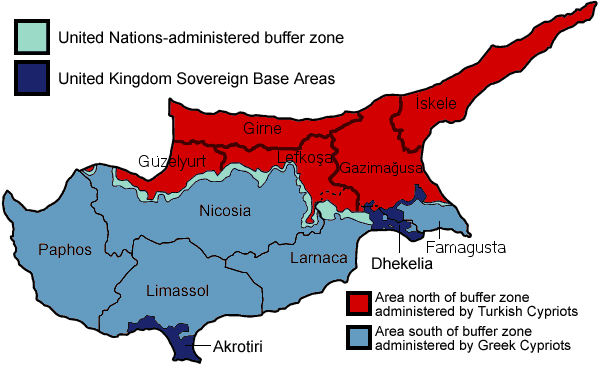
The self-declared Turkish Republic of Northern Cyprus has been recognised only by Turkey since its establishment in 1983. In 2004, the Parliamentary Assembly of the Council of Europe (PACE) gave observer status (without voting rights) to the representatives of the Turkish Cypriot community.

The Turkish government has refused to officially recognise the Republic of Cyprus until the removal of the political and economic blockade on the Turkish Republic of Northern Cyprus. Turkey's non-recognition of the Republic of Cyprus has led to complications within the Customs Union. Under the customs agreements which Turkey had already signed as a precondition to start EU membership negotiations in 2005, it is obliged to open its ports to Cypriot planes and vessels, but Turkey has not complied so far; refusing to do so until the EU eases the international isolation of Northern Cyprus. In February 2013, Turkish EU Minister Egemen Bağış told the Republic of Cyprus, "if you truly want salvation, truly want peace, then remove your blockade of Ercan Airport to EU member countries and Turkey will open its ports to you."

Turkey's refusal to implement a trade pact between Turkey and the EU that requires the Turkish government to allow Greek Cypriot vessels to use its air and seaports has prompted the EU to freeze eight chapters in Turkey's accession talks.

In November 2009, Turkish Deputy Prime Minister Cemil Çiçek declared that, should Turkey be forced to choose between supporting either EU membership or Turkish Cypriots, "[then] Turkey's choice will forever be to stand next to the Turkish Cypriots. Everybody should understand this."

==== Greece ====
The issue of Turkish membership has been contentious in Greece. An opinion poll from 2005 suggested that only 25% of Greeks believe Turkey has a place in the European Union. The former Greek Prime Minister Kostas Karamanlis stated that Turkish membership of the EU could only be predicated upon, "full compliance, full accession" in December 2006. In 2005 the European Commission referred to relations between Turkey and Greece as "continuing to develop positively" while also citing a key barrier to progress being Turkey's ongoing claim of casus belli over a dispute about territorial waters boundaries. In September 2017, Greek Prime Minister, Alexis Tsipras, mentioned that halting accession talks with Turkey would be a strategic mistake by the European Union, amid a war of words raging between Germany and Turkey. Also, former Greek Prime Minister, George Papandreou, has urged European Union leaders to keep the doors open to Turkey and to continue dialogue with the Turkish government, in an apparent reference to the former German Chancellor Angela Merkel's calls for the suspension of accession talks with Turkey.

=== Religion ===
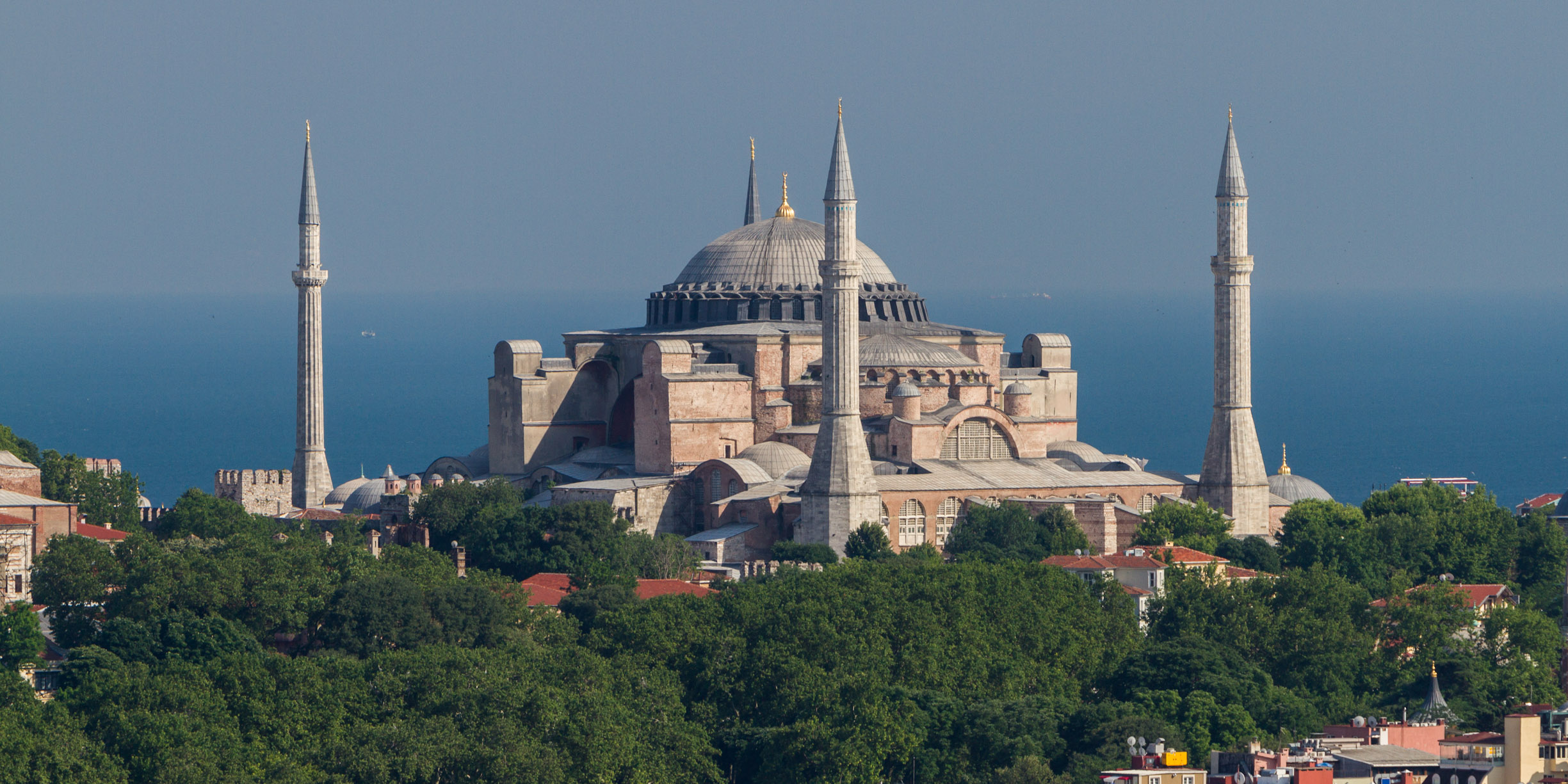
Originally a church, later a mosque, the 6th century Hagia Sophia (532–537) in Constantinople (Istanbul) built by the Byzantine emperor Justinian the Great was the largest cathedral ever constructed in the world for nearly a millennium, until the completion of the Seville Cathedral (1507) in Spain.

Turkey has a secular constitution, civil and judicial system with no official religion, although the country's most prominent imam (currently Safi Arpaguş) is a civil servant and head of the Religious Affairs Directorate, or Diyanet. 82% of the Turkish population is Muslim of whom over 70% belong to the Sunni branch of Islam. A minority is affiliated with syncretic Alevi branch. A separate study published in 2019 found 89.5% of Turks identify as Muslim. Turkey would be the first and only Muslim-majority country to join or belong to the European Union. Current EU states typically contain large Muslim minorities. By contrast, Christians are believed to compose only 0.2% of Turkey's population.

Official population census polls in Turkey do not include information regarding a person's religious belief or ethnic background due to the regulations set by the Turkish constitution, which defines all citizens of the Republic of Turkey as Turkish in terms of nationality, regardless of faith or race.

There is a tradition of secularism in Turkey. The state has no official religion nor promotes any, and actively monitors the area between the religions. The constitution recognises the freedom of religion for individuals, whereas religious communities are placed under the protection of the state; but the constitution explicitly states that they cannot become involved in the political process (by forming a religious party, for instance) or establish faith-based schools. No party can claim that it represents a form of religious belief; nevertheless, religious sensibilities are generally represented through conservative parties. Turkey used to prohibit by law the wearing of religious headcover and theo-political symbolic garments for both sexes in government buildings, schools, and universities; the law was upheld by the Grand Chamber of the European Court of Human Rights as legitimate in the Leyla Şahin v. Turkey case on 10 November 2005. However, in 2010, the prohibition of wearing headscarves in universities was lifted.

Cultural differences between Muslim-majority Turkey and predominantly Christian Europe play an important part in the entire debate on Turkish accession to the European Union.

=== Armenian genocide recognition ===
In 2004, the French Foreign Minister Michel Barnier stated that Turkey must recognise the systematic massacres of Armenians in 1915 as a genocide. However, he insisted that although France did not set a precondition for European Union entry regarding the matter, he stated that France would raise the issue during negotiations. The former president of the European Parliament, Martin Schulz, stated that it must be a precondition for Turkey to recognise the systematic massacres of Armenians in 1915 as genocide.

The government of Turkey rejects such a precondition for EU membership and does not accept it as a part of the EU membership criteria.

In 2006, the European Parliament voted against a proposal to formally add the issue as a membership criterion for Turkey. A similar proposal by Greek and Greek Cypriot MEPs was also rejected by the European Parliament in 2011.

=== LGBT rights in Turkey ===
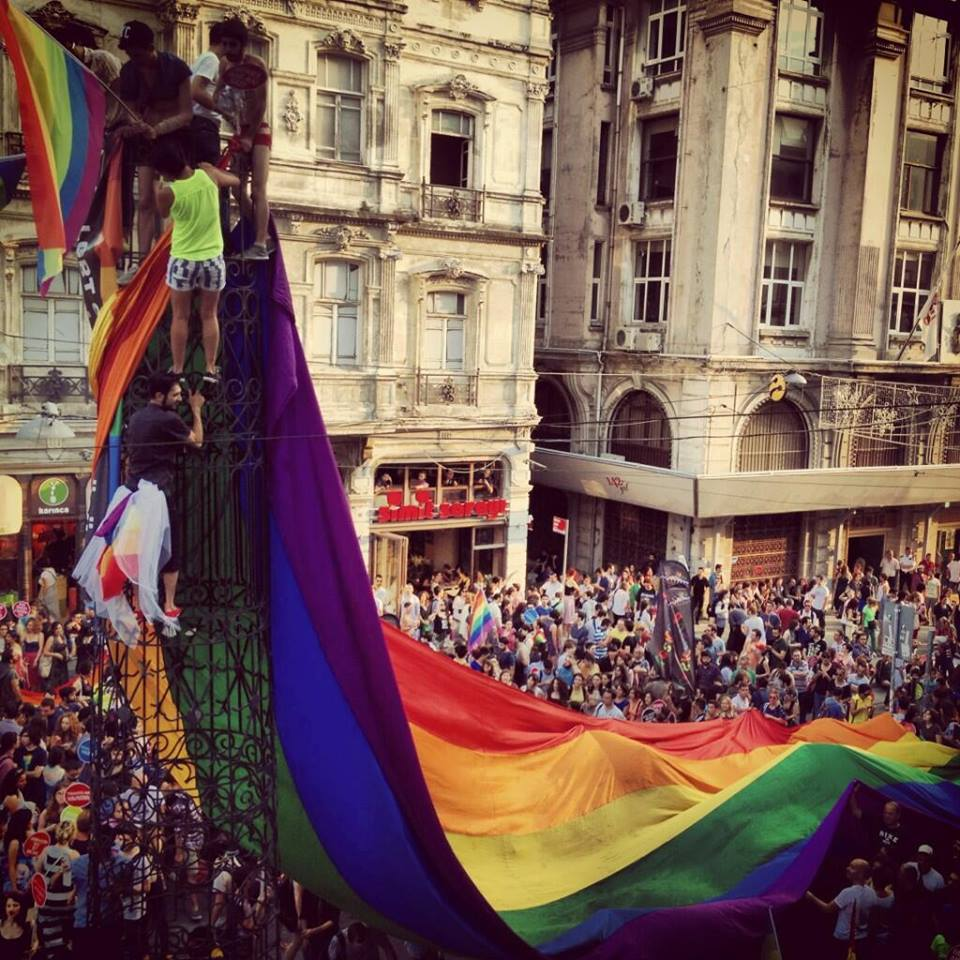
LGBT Istanbul Pride parade in 2013, İstiklal Avenue, Istanbul (before the ban in 2015)

Although homosexuality is not a crime in Turkey, in contravention of European Union directives on human rights; Turkey temporarily banned LGBT pride parades in 2015 and 2016. Reasons given for the ban were "security concerns", and "religious sensitivities of the public" caused by holding the parade during the month of Ramadan.

=== Article 301 ===
Article 301 states that "a person who publicly insults the Turkish nation, the State of the Republic of Turkey, or the Grand National Assembly of Turkey, shall be punishable by imprisonment of between six months and two years" and also that "expressions of thought intended to criticise shall not constitute a crime."

The EU was especially critical of this law during the September 2005 trial of novelist Orhan Pamuk over comments that recognised the deaths of thirty thousand Kurds and a million Armenians. Enlargement commissioner Olli Rehn and members of the European Parliament called the case "regrettable", "most unfortunate", and "unacceptable". After the case was dropped three months later, Turkey's Foreign Minister Abdullah Gül indicated that Turkey may abandon or modify Article 301, stating that "there may be need for a new law". In September 2006, the European Parliament called for the abolition of laws, such as Article 301, "which threaten European free speech norms". On 30 April 2008, the law was reformed. According to the reform, it is now a crime to explicitly insult the "Turkish nation" rather than "Turkishness"; opening court cases based on Article 301 require the approval of the Justice Minister; and the maximum punishment has been reduced to two years in jail.

Kemal Kerinçsiz, a patriotic lawyer, and other members of Büyük Hukukçular Birliği (Great Jurists Union) headed by Kerinçsiz, have been "behind nearly all of [Article 301] trials." In January 2008, Kerinçsiz was arrested for participating in an ultra-nationalist underground organisation, Ergenekon, allegedly behind the attacks on the Turkish Council of State and Cumhuriyet newspaper, the assassination of several Christian missionaries and Armenian-Turkish journalist Hrant Dink, as well as allegedly plotting the assassination of Nobel laureate Orhan Pamuk. The Ergenekon trials were later attributed to a plot organized by a "foreign-based Gulenist terror organization" and all charges were dropped after the alleged military coup by Gulenists on 15 July 2016.

=== Women's rights ===
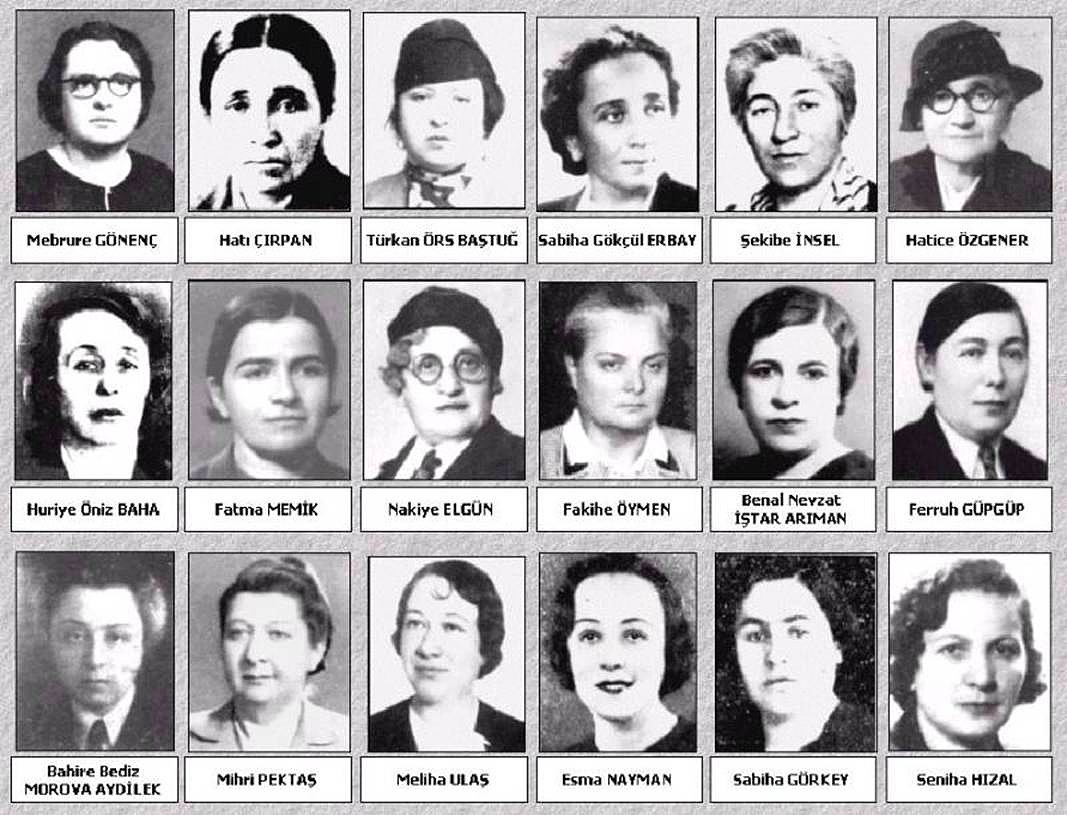
Eighteen female MPs joined the Turkish Parliament with the 1935 general elections, at a time when women in a significant number of other European countries had voting rights for the local municipal elections, but not for the national parliamentary elections. In 1993 Tansu Çiller became Turkey's first female Prime Minister.

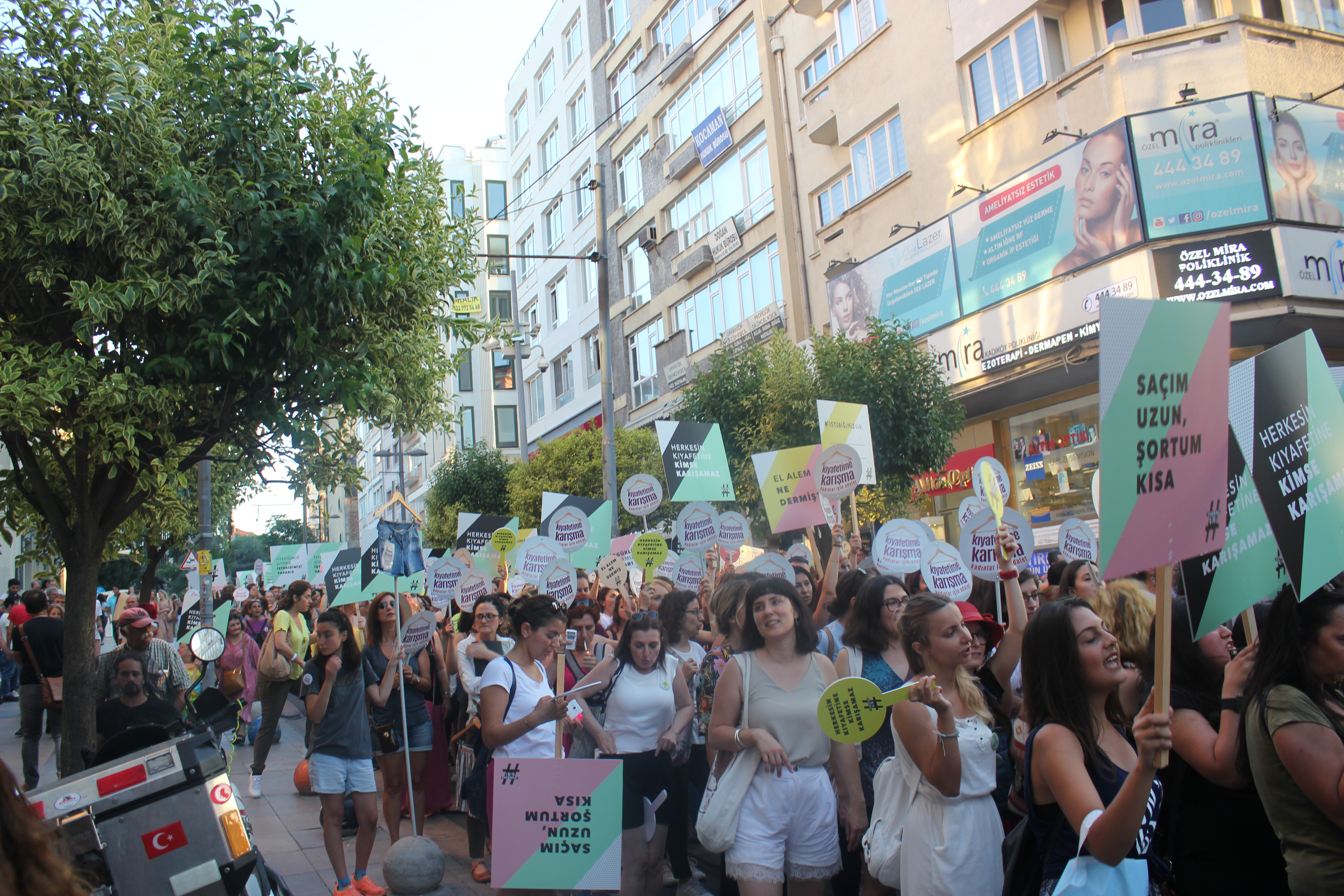
Women in Turkey protesting for their rights. On 20 March 2021, with a presidential decree, Turkey withdrew from the Istanbul Convention, which was ratified by the Turkish parliament in 2011. The decision was criticised by the European Commission and the Council of Europe.

Turkey gave women the right to vote in 1930 for municipal elections. In 1934 this right was expanded for the national elections, while women were also given the right to become elected as MPs in the Turkish Parliament, or for being appointed as Ministers, Prime Minister, Speaker of the Parliament and President of the Republic. In 1993 Tansu Çiller became the first female Prime Minister of Turkey.

In its second report on women's role in social, economic, and political life in Turkey, the European Parliament emphasised that respecting human rights, including women's rights, is an essential condition for Turkey's membership in the EU. According to the report, Turkey's legal framework on women's rights "has in general been satisfactory, but its substantive implementation remains flawed."

=== Conscientious objectors ===
Turkey is one of two states (along with Azerbaijan) among the 47 members of the Council of Europe which refuse to recognise the status of conscientious objectors or give them an alternative to military service, other than a reduction of service by paying a tax.

== Public reactions ==
=== In the EU ===
==== 2000s ====
Public opinion in EU countries generally opposes Turkish membership, though with varying degrees of intensity. The Eurobarometer September–October 2006 survey shows that 59% of EU-27 citizens were against Turkey joining the EU, while only about 28% were in favour. Nearly all citizens (about 9 in 10) expressed concerns about human rights as the leading cause. In the earlier March–May 2006 Eurobarometer, citizens from the new member states were more in favour of Turkey joining (44% in favour) than the old EU-15 (38% in favour). At the time of the survey, the country whose population most strongly opposed Turkish membership was Austria (con: 81%), while Romania was most in favour of the accession (pro: 66%). On a wider political scope, the highest support came from the Turkish Cypriot Community (pro: 67%) (which is not recognised as a sovereign state and is de facto not EU territory and out of the European institutions). These communities were even more in favour of the accession than the Turkish populace itself (pro: 54%). Opposition in Denmark to Turkish membership was polled at 60% in October 2007, despite the Danish government's support for Turkey's EU bid.

==== 2010s ====
There is a trend in declining support since 2000 that has continued due to the 2013 Gezi protests and the Purges in Turkey (2016–present). In the past support for Turkish accession came especially from left-wing parties, but more recently both sides of the political spectrum in Europe have been highly critical of Turkey's human rights record. Opposition to Turkish accession is higher in countries such as Bulgaria and Germany which have a high population of Turkish diaspora or Muslims in Europe.

YouGov polls from 2016 and 2019 have found respondents from France, Germany, Denmark, Finland and Sweden to have the largest net opposition to Turkey's EU bid out of several other choices, including Israel and Russia.

=== In Turkey ===
==== 2000s ====
The opening of membership talks with the EU in December 2004 was celebrated by Turkey with much fanfare, but the Turkish populace has become increasingly sceptical as negotiations were delayed based on what it views as lukewarm support for its accession to the EU and perceived double standards in its negotiations particularly with regard to the French and Austrian referendums. A mid-2006 Eurobarometer survey revealed that 43% of Turkish citizens view the EU positively; just 35% trust the EU, 45% support enlargement and just 29% support an EU constitution.

Moreover, Turks were divided on whether to join at all. A 2007 poll put Turkish support for accession to the EU at 41.9% (up from 32% in 2006), with 27.7% opposed and 24.0% indifferent. A 2009 poll showed that support for accession had risen to 48%, even as negative views of the EU had risen from 28% to 32%.

==== 2010s ====
A 2013 poll showed Turkish support for the EU bid at one third of the population, and opposition to double that share.

According to the Transatlantic Trends survey for 2013, 60% of Turks have an unfavourable view of the European Union and most Turks believe that working with Asia is more important to their national interests than working with Europe. Around 44% of Turks believe EU membership could be good for the economy in contrast with 61% for EU citizens. During an interview with Euractiv, EU Minister Egemen Bağış stated that: "This is what Europe needs to do; they need to say that when Turkey fulfills all requirements, Turkey will become a member of the EU on date X. Then, we will regain the Turkish public opinion support in one day."

==== 2020s ====
According to the 2025 annual survey of opinion in Turkey, 51% of citizens have a positive attitude towards the EU (21% very positive, 30% fairly positive), and 58% of citizens would vote in favour of Turkish membership in the EU if a referendum were to be held, while 66% of citizens see EU membership as more advantageous than disadvantageous.

== Official viewpoints ==
=== Major current viewpoints ===
- 2014 EU Presidential candidates Jean-Claude Juncker (EEP) and Martin Schulz (S&D) promised that Turkey would never join the European Union while either one of them were President, reasoning that Turkey had turned its back on European democratic values. Juncker won the election and became the new president of the EU in November 2014. He stated that April:

... under my Presidency of the Commission ... no further enlargement will take place over the next five years. As regards Turkey, the country is clearly far away from EU membership. A government that blocks Twitter is certainly not ready for accession.

- Primary reasons for Turkey's persistent requests to join the EU are, among others, the many Turks in Europe and the importance of trade between the two. Turkey is, however, also increasingly disappointed with the widespread opposition to its accession among EU member states. In September 2012, Turkish Prime Minister Erdoğan was asked by CNN if Turkey still wants to join the EU. His response: "There are 5 million Turks in Europe and 3 million Turks in Germany alone. We are a natural member of the European Union. Germany invited Turkish workers 50 years ago, however, 50 years have passed and we have waited at the European Union's doorstep. No other country has experienced such a thing. We will be patient until a point. However, when we cross that point, we will bring light to the situation and decide accordingly." During a trip to Yalta, Erdoğan expressed his stern disappointment regarding the EU accession process: "We are still an EU negotiating candidate. At such a position, I wish EU accession. Otherwise, such a scenario would affect a large region including Ukraine and Turkey."
- (Germany) Former German Chancellor Angela Merkel has repeatedly opposed full membership of Turkey to the EU at German-Turkish summits, advocating instead a privileged partnership. Some Christian Democrats back fuller support for Turkey, risking the chancellor becoming more isolated in advocating for a "privileged partnership". In September 2011, on the occasion of the visit of the Turkish president Gül, Merkel said: "We don't want the full membership of Turkey. But we don't want to lose Turkey as an important country", referring to her idea of a strategic partnership. In 2006, Chancellor Merkel said "Turkey could be in deep, deep trouble when it comes to its aspirations to join the European Union" regarding its refusal to open up its ports to European Union member Cyprus. Again in 2014, when Erdogan urged Merkel to strongly support his country's bid, there was no sign the chancellor had relinquished her skepticism. She revealed after the two had talked: "I personally said that we are in a negotiation process that has certain outcome and no fixed time frame. It is no secret and nothing has changed in my view that I am sceptical about full membership for Turkey." In a TV debate in September 2017, then-German chancellor Angela Merkel and her challenger Martin Schulz both said that they would seek an end to Turkey's membership talks with the European Union.
- Former French President Nicolas Sarkozy opposed the entrance of Turkey in the European Union, arguing the country was too big, too poor, and too culturally different to join the EU. Former President Francois Hollande, however, reaffirmed support for Turkey in 2012, intending to smooth the way for French companies seeking contracts in Turkey. Franco-Turkish relations remained tense after Turkey imposed a law in 2009 that criminalised recognition of the killing of Armenians by Ottoman Turks in 1915 as a genocide; a move France's Constitutional Court reversed, in turn, causing French firms' share of foreign investment in Turkey to shrink from 6% in 2009 to 3% in 2012. Leaders of French infrastructure companies were especially eager to enter the Turkish markets for nuclear security and rail infrastructure, expected to respectively be worth $40 and $50 billion by 2020.

=== Timeline ===
- In September 1999, following a thaw in Greek-Turkish relations after mutual help in earthquake relief, Greek Foreign Minister George Papandreou told The Guardian "Greece not only wants to see Turkey in the EU, it wants to be pulling the cart of a European Turkey", and that it was within his nation's interests as a way to avoid "continual conflict and tension with the block and European standards".
- (France) / In November 2002, then-French President and then-President of the European Convention Valéry Giscard d'Estaing said in an interview with the French newspaper Le Monde, "Turkey is an important country close to Europe, but it is not a European country. It is not a European country because its capital is not in Europe and 95% of its population lives outside Europe." he said. Estaing continued as follows: "The Union should now focus on internal financial problems and the construction of European harmony instead of expansion. Those who most support Turkey joining the Union are actually opponents of the European Union. In fact, the majority of European Council members are against Turkey joining, but the Turks were never told this. Turkey joining the European Union would mean the end of the European Union."
- (European Union) The 2005 EU Progress Report stated that: "On 29 July 2005, Turkey signed the Additional Protocol adapting the EC Turkey Association Agreement to the accession of 10 new countries on 1 May 2004. At the same time, Turkey issued a declaration stating that the signature of the Additional Protocol did not amount to recognition of the Republic of Cyprus. On 21 September, the EU adopted a counter-declaration indicating that Turkey's declaration was unilateral, did not form part of the Protocol, and had no legal effect on Turkey's obligations under the Protocol. The EU declaration stressed that recognition of all Member States was a necessary component of the accession process. It also underlined the need for supporting the efforts of the Secretary General of the UN to bring about a comprehensive settlement of the Cyprus problem which would contribute to peace, stability and harmonious relations in the region."
- (European Union) In November 2006, the European Commission members decided to suspend parts of the talks with Turkey regarding accession, as Turkish officials said that they will not open Turkish ports to traffic from the Republic of Cyprus until the EU eases its embargo on Turkish-controlled northern Cyprus.
- (European Union) In 2007, European Commission President José Manuel Barroso said that Turkey is not ready to join the EU "tomorrow nor the day after tomorrow", but its membership negotiations should continue. He also called on France and other member states to honour the decision to continue accession talks, describing it as a matter of credibility for the Union.
- On 28 June 2007, Portuguese State Secretary for European Affairs Manuel Lobo Antunes affirmed that "Turkey should join the EU once it has successfully completed membership talks, which are likely to run for at least a decade." "We think it is important and fundamental that Turkey joins the European Union once it fulfils all the conditions and all the criteria," he said, adding that "Portugal aims in the next six months to 'put the process on track'."
- (Italy) On 5 November 2008, the Italian Foreign Minister Franco Frattini declared that "the Italian government will support the inclusion of Turkey in the European Union with all its strength." He indicated that "the Italian Parliament will give a 'clear word' when necessary with the 'enormous majority' of the Berlusconi government, but also with 'the opposition' which it knows it can count on." "Turkey's inclusion will not be a problem, but it will be part of the solution for strengthening Europe in relations with other countries, such as the Caucasus region" he added.
- (Italy) On 13 November 2008, the Italian Prime Minister Silvio Berlusconi urged the EU to "accelerate Turkey's membership bid" and pledged to "help Ankara gain accession." Berlusconi pledged to "try and win over those EU members resistant to Turkey's application." "Regarding the opposition shown by certain countries – some of which are important countries – I am confident we will be able to convince them of the strategic importance of Turkey, within the European framework, as a country bordering the Middle East," Berlusconi declared.
- / (France) On 29 May 2009, French President Nicolas Sarkozy cancelled a visit to Sweden scheduled for 2 June 2009, to avoid a clash on the question of Turkey's EU membership just a few days before the European elections and a month before Stockholm took over the EU's rotating presidency. The French President, who is an outspoken opponent of Turkey's entry to the European Union, did not want to highlight the strong divergence of views on this topic with Swedish Prime Minister Fredrik Reinfeldt, the French newspaper Le Monde reported on 28 May 2009. Sweden favours further EU enlargement, including to Turkey. Swedish Foreign Minister Carl Bildt told the French newspaper Le Figaro that "the EU has 'a strategic interest' in Turkey's EU integration and warned against 'closing the door' to Ankara." "If we judge Cyprus to be in Europe, although it is an island along Syria's shores, it is hard not to consider that Turkey is in Europe," Bildt said, referring to Sarkozy's repeated statements that Turkey is not a European country and does not belong to Europe. In the Le Figaro interview, Bildt said: "My vision of Europe is not as defensive as I observe it with other people." The French president's trip to Sweden was cancelled the day after the interview was published. "Nicolas Sarkozy cancelled his visit because of the Carl Bildt interview," one French minister told Le Monde. "The president wanted to avoid a clash on Turkey and did not want that his visit to Sweden interferes with the elections [five days later]." In March 2013, King Carl XVI of Sweden said that "The EU will become stronger with Turkey"
- On 5 April 2009, Spanish Prime Minister José Luis Rodríguez Zapatero stated that "Spain firmly supports Turkey's candidature to enter the EU, provided it meets the necessary requisites." Zapatero told Turkish Prime Minister Recep Tayyip Erdoğan that "Spain's position is 'firm, clear and solid' in favour of Turkey's candidature to enter the European Union." "We must 'open the door' for Turkey to enter 'the EU peace and cooperation project', provided it meets the necessary requisites for integration," Zapatero added; before remarking that "Turkey's entrance is good both for Turkey and for the EU."
- (Greece) In November 2009, Greek President Karolos Papoulias stated that he would not support Turkey's accession "as long as Ankara behaves as an occupying force in Cyprus."
- On 4 November 2009, David Miliband, the Foreign Secretary of the United Kingdom, during a visit to Turkey underlined the UK government's support for Turkey's bid to join the European Union, saying: "I am very clear that Turkish accession to the EU is important and will be of huge benefit to both Turkey and the EU."
- On 27 July 2010, David Cameron, former Prime Minister of the United Kingdom, during a visit to Turkey promised to "fight" for Turkey's membership of the European Union, saying he is "angry" at the slow pace of negotiations. He added that "a European Union without Turkey at its heart is not stronger but weaker... not more secure but less... not richer but poorer." On 22 May 2016, Cameron said that "it is not remotely on the cards that Turkey is going to join the EU any time soon. They applied in 1987. At the current rate of progress they will probably get round to joining in about the year 3000 according to the latest forecasts."
- On 23 December 2010, President of the European Council Herman Van Rompuy he said "Turkish reform efforts have delivered impressive results." He continued "Turkey plays an ever more active role in its neighbourhood. Turkey is also a full-standing member of the G-20, just like five EU countries and the EU itself. In my view, even before an outcome of the negotiations, the European Union should develop a close partnership with the Turkish Republic."
- (Finland) In March 2011, then-Finnish President Tarja Halonen pledged her country's full support for Turkey's European Union membership process.
- (Germany) On 3 July 2013, at an election rally of the Christian Democrat Party in Düsseldorf, German Finance Minister Wolfgang Schäuble stated that Turkey should not join the European Union as it is not part of Europe.
- On 7 June 2013, Turkey's Undersecretary of the Ministry of EU Affairs Haluk Ilıcak said "The process means more than the accession. Once the necessary levels are achieved, Turkey is big enough to continue its development without the accession. Our aim is to achieve a smooth accession process."
- In 2013, Czech Republic Prime Minister Petr Nečas said: "We continue to believe that Turkey should be given the chance to become a full-fledged member of the European Union after it meets all accession criteria". He described Turkey as an important partner to the EU and praised the constructive role it plays in the Middle East region.
- In March 2016, Turkish President Recep Tayyip Erdoğan said that democracy and freedom were "phrases" which had "absolutely no value" in Turkey, after calling for journalists, lawyers and politicians to be prosecuted as terrorists.
- In July 2016, European Union High Representative for Foreign Affairs and Security Policy Federica Mogherini announced that EU membership negotiations would be terminated if the death penalty was reinstated in Turkey.
- (Austria) In August 2016, then-Austrian Chancellor Christian Kern called for the suspension of full membership negotiations between the EU and Turkey.
- (Turkey) In March 2017, in a speech given to supporters in the western Turkish city of Sakarya, Turkish President Recep Tayyip Erdoğan said "my dear brothers, a battle has started between the cross and the half moon" (referring to Christianity and Islam respectively) after insulting European government politicians as "Nazis" in the weeks before. The same month, he threatened that Europeans would "not be able to walk safely on the streets" if they kept up banning Turkish ministers from addressing rallies in Europe. European politicians rejected Erdoğan's comments.
- In the context of the imminent Turkish constitutional referendum in April 2017, the Vice President of the European Parliament, Alexander Graf Lambsdorff, summarized the state of affairs as this: "In law Turkey is still a candidate, in fact, it is not. Nobody believes in Brussels or in Ankara for that matter that Turkey will eventually join the European Union. And that is why we say it is better to make a new start and put the relationship on a new foundation."
- (Germany) In a TV debate in September 2017, then-German chancellor Angela Merkel and her then challenger Martin Schulz both said that they would seek an end to Turkey's membership talks with the European Union.
- (Finland) In September 2017, then-Finnish foreign minister Timo Soini, announced that they were in favor of not stopping Turkey's membership negotiations with the European Union.
- (Austria) In December 2017, then-Austrian Chancellor Sebastian Kurz announced that they were in favor of stopping Turkey's accession negotiations with the European Union.
- (Austria) On 17 July 2018, then-Austrian Chancellor Sebastian Kurz, in an interview with the Greek newspaper Kathimerini, called for ending full membership negotiations between the EU and Turkey and developing relations instead of full membership negotiations. Kurz said: "I have been speaking out for years about developing an honest relationship with Turkey." Kurz continued as follows: "EU membership negotiations with Turkey should be stopped immediately. Turkey has continuously moved away from Europe and its values over the last few years. We should also focus on exploring other forms of cooperation between our neighbors the EU and Turkey."
- (Austria) In September 2023, Austrian Chancellor Karl Nehammer, in an interview with the German newspaper Die Welt, called for the termination of full membership negotiations between the EU and Turkey and the development of a new concept within the relations between the EU and Turkey.
- In September 2023, Turkish President Recep Tayyip Erdoğan announced that the European Union was well into a rupture in its relations with Turkey and that they could part ways, if necessary, during Turkey's European Union membership process.
- On 17 December 2024, Turkish President Recep Tayyip Erdoğan, in his meeting with President of the European Commission Ursula von der Leyen, stated that they wanted to open a new page in EU-Turkey relations, that Turkey's EU accession negotiations were a strategic goal, that the customs union should be updated again, and that visa liberalization negotiations should be resumed. He announced that they expect the EU-Turkey summit to be held as soon as possible.
- On 8 May 2025, the European Parliament voted to support the continued freezing of Turkey's accession to the EU due to "the recent democratic backsliding" and "that geographic and geopolitical importance of Turkey wouldn't make up for the democratic backsliding in Turkey". The report, which was passed with 367 votes, stated that Turkey's European Union registration process cannot be restarted under current conditions. Members of the European Parliament also expressed "deep concern" about the deterioration of democratic standards and the disproportionate interventions against peaceful mass protests and the rapid trials without evidence and the increasing pressure on critical voices in Turkey. Political attacks on Istanbul Metropolitan Municipality Mayor and Presidential Candidate Ekrem İmamoğlu were also evaluated as “political moves to prevent a legitimate opponent from participating in the elections.”

== Challenges to Accession ==
The accession process of Turkey into the European Union remains stalled primarily due to significant concerns regarding democratic standards, judicial independence, and the protection of fundamental human rights. A critical hurdle is the systematic use of prolonged pretrial detention and a politicized judiciary. Furthermore, the unresolved Cyprus dispute and a lack of consensus among current EU members continue to block progress, with many leaders favoring a strategic partnership over full integration.

== See also ==
- Foreign relations of the European Union
- Foreign relations of Turkey
- European Union–Turkey relations
  - Netherlands–Turkey relations
  - France–Turkey relations
  - Germany–Turkey relations
  - Belgium–Turkey relations
  - Denmark–Turkey relations
  - Greece–Turkey relations
  - Bulgaria–Turkey relations
  - Austria–Turkey relations
  - Romania–Turkey relations
  - Spain–Turkey relations
  - Italy–Turkey relations
  - Turkey–United Kingdom relations
  - Finland–Turkey relations
  - Sweden–Turkey relations
  - Cyprus dispute
  - Turkey in the Council of Europe
  - Turkey in NATO
- Purges in Turkey (2016–present)
- Human rights in Turkey
- Islam in Europe
- Turks in Europe
- Anti-Turkish sentiment
- Enlargement of the European Union
