= Belgium–Turkey relations =

Foreign relations between Turkiye and Belgium

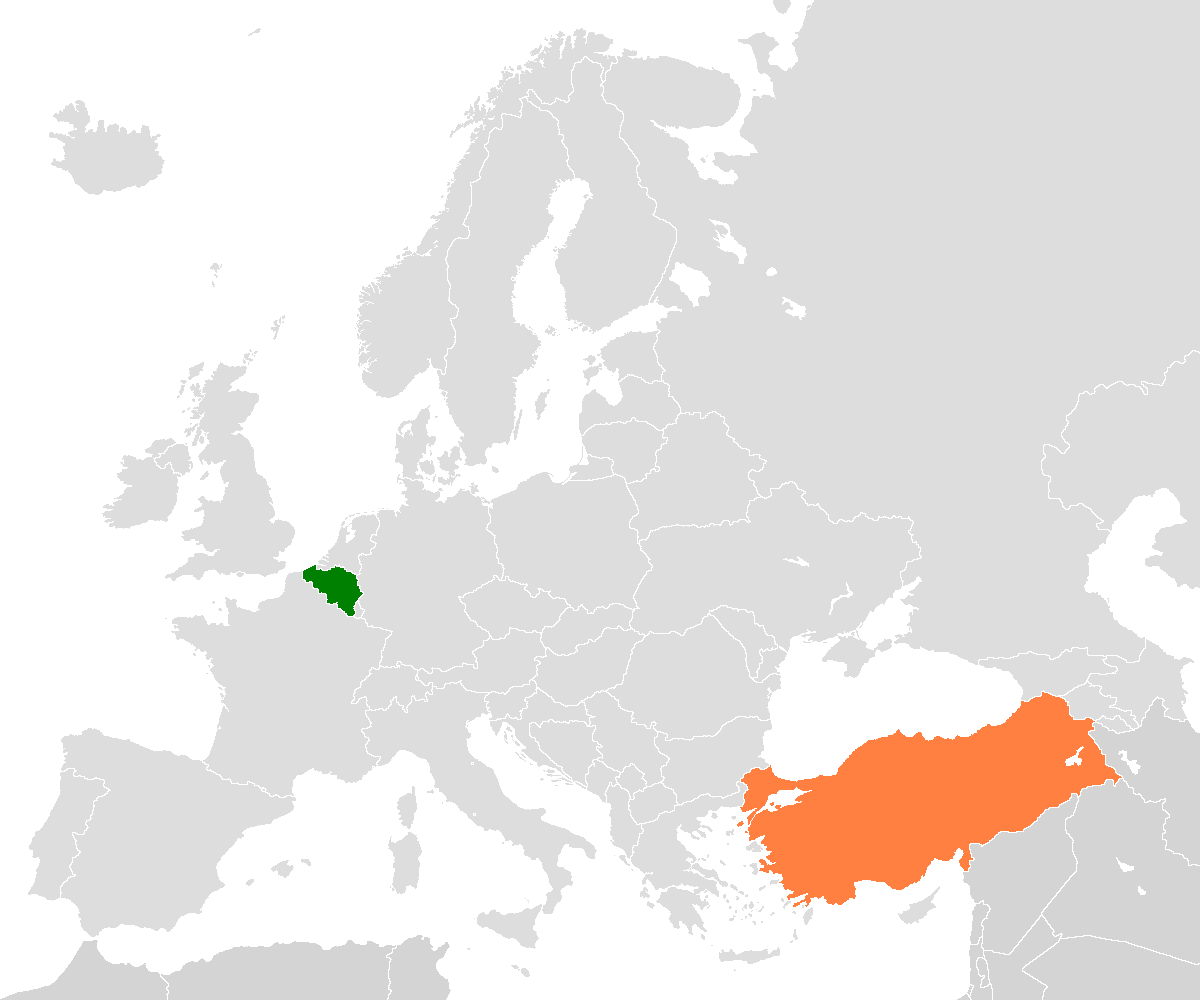
- Belgium: Turkey

Belgium–Turkey relations are foreign relations between Belgium and Turkey. Belgium has an embassy in Ankara, a consulate–general in Istanbul and two consulates in Antalya and İzmir. Turkey has an embassy in Brussels and a consulate–general in Antwerp.

== History ==
Relations between the two countries started in 1837 with the recognition of independent Belgium by the Ottoman Empire. Diplomatic relations were established in 1838.

== Political relations ==
Belgium and Turkey are both members of the Council of Europe, the North Atlantic Treaty Organization (NATO) the Organisation for Economic Co-operation and Development (OECD) the Organization for Security and Co-operation in Europe (OSCE) the World Trade Organization (WTO) and the Union for the Mediterranean. Also Belgium is a European Union member and Turkey is a candidate.

The approximately 230,000 Turkish citizens living in Belgium constitute an important aspect in Turkey's relations with Belgium. They come predominantly from the Emirdağ district, located in Afyonkarahisar, Turkey.

In March 2019, the Turkish foreign ministry summoned the Belgian ambassador, Michel Malherbe, and relayed Turkey's unease after a Belgian court blocked the prosecution of some 30 people with alleged links to the Kurdistan Workers’ Party (PKK).

Belgium condemned the 2019 Turkish offensive into north-eastern Syria and called on Turkey to halt it immediately. The Belgian government later decided to implement an arms embargo against Turkey.

== Economic relations ==
Trade volume between Turkey and Belgium has increased remarkably over the years and reached $ 6.886 billion in 2017. In 2017, Belgian exports to Turkey were $ 3.729 billion, whereas Turkish exports to Belgium were $ 3.127 billion. Belgium is the seventeenth largest trade partner of Turkey.

The Turkish–Belgian Business Council, and organisations with similar aims, give priority to promoting commercial linkages. This council was established in 1990.

There are more than 200 Belgian firms operating in Turkey. The value of Belgian investments in Turkey is around $ 320 million. On the other hand, the investment of Turkish companies in Belgium has exceeded $ 8 billion.

In 2017, 419,998 Belgian tourists visited Turkey.

The bilateral trade volume between Turkey and Belgium stood at $8.66 billion in 2023 (Turkish exports 4.36 billion US Dollars; imports 4.3 billion US Dollars). Main items of Turkey's exports to Belgium are motor vehicles and parts, textile products, machinery and equipment, plastic, whilst main items of Turkey's imports from Belgium are chemical products, plastic, metals, machinery and equipment, vehicles parts.

In 2023, around 597 thousand Belgium tourists visited Turkey.

== Visits ==
Guest	Host	Place of visit	Date of visit	Reference
Prime Minister Abdullah Gül	Prime Minister Guy Verhofstadt	Brussels	February 17, 2003	
Prime Minister Guy Verhofstadt	Prime Minister Recep Tayyip Erdoğan	Ankara and Istanbul	November 2–4, 2003	
President of the Belgian Chamber of Representatives Herman De Croo	Speaker of the Parliament of Turkey Bülent Arınç	Grand National Assembly of Turkey, Ankara	November 28–December 1, 2004	
Minister of Foreign Affairs Karel De Gucht	Minister of Foreign Affairs Abdullah Gül	Ankara	October 30–31, 2006	
President Abdullah Gül	King Albert II	Brussels	March 25–27, 2009	
Prime Minister Yves Leterme	Prime Minister Recep Tayyip Erdoğan	Ankara	December 29–30, 2009	

== Embassies ==
The Embassy of Belgium is located in Ankara, Turkey. The Embassy of Turkey is located in Brussels, Belgium.

== See also ==
- Foreign relations of Belgium
- Foreign relations of Turkey
- Turkey–EU relations
  - Accession of Turkey to the EU
- NATO-EU relations
- Turks in Belgium
- Turks in Europe
