= Latvia–Turkey relations =

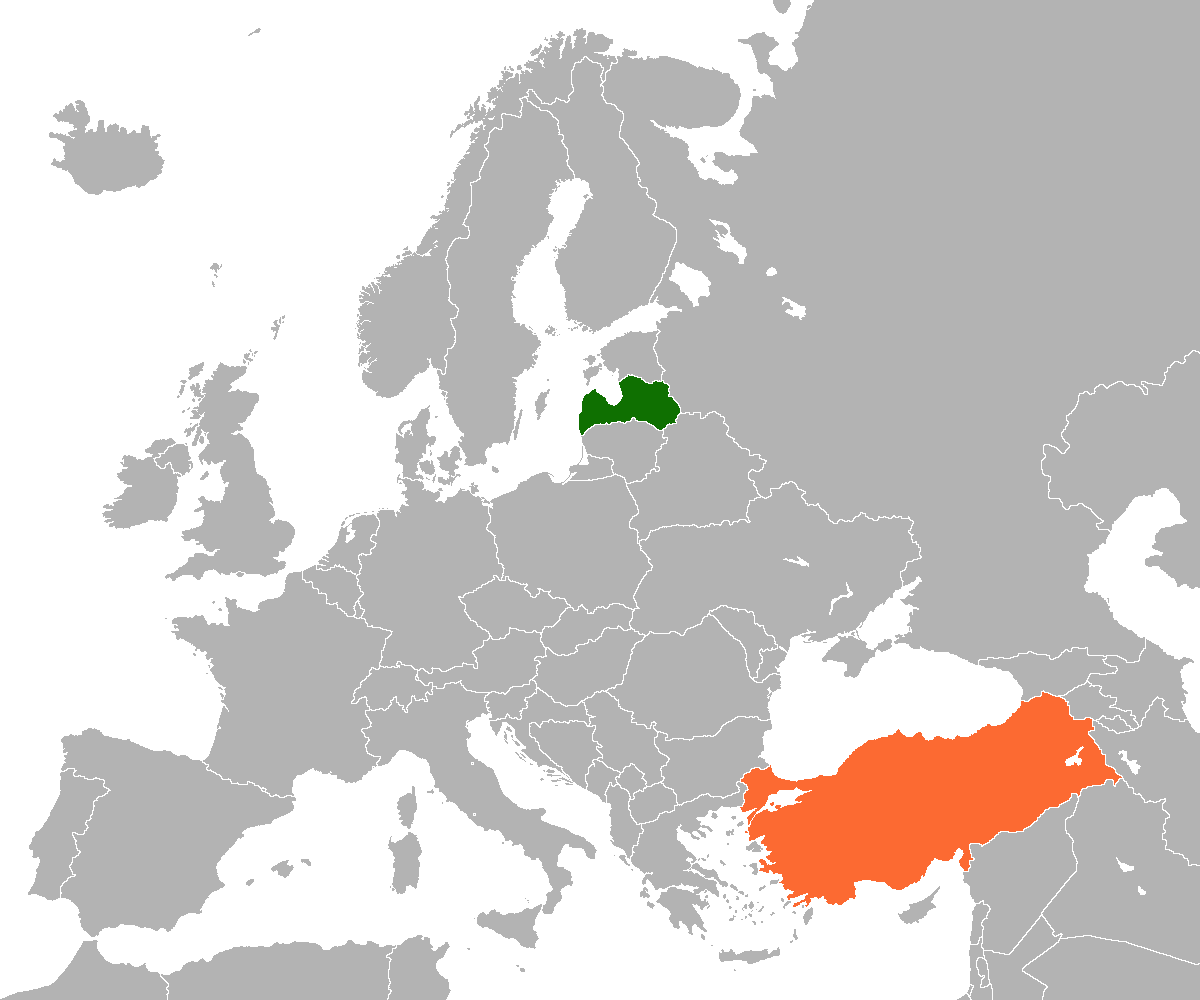

- Latvia: Turkey

Diplomatic mission
- Latvian Embassy, Ankara: Turkish Embassy, Riga

Envoy
- Ambassador Pēteris Vaivars: Ambassador Gülsun Erkul

Latvia–Turkey relations are the foreign relations between Latvia and Turkey. Both countries are members of NATO and the Council of Europe. Latvia is an EU member and Turkey is an EU candidate. Latvia supports Accession of Turkey to the EU, although negotiations have now been suspended.

== History ==
- Turkey recognized the independence of Latvia in 1925.
- Following the USSR annexation of Latvia in August 1940, Turkey closed its consulate in Riga– in tandem with the United States– on September 5, 1940. Despite the closure of the consulate, Turkey never recognized the Latvia's annexation and continued diplomatic relations with Latvia and Estonia by conferring diplomatic status on the diplomats that were accredited by the previous Latvian government.
- Turkey recognized the restoration of Latvia's independence on September 3, 1991.

== High level visits ==
Guest	Host	Place of visit	Date of visit
(Latvia) President Andris Bērziņš	(Turkey) President Abdullah Gül	Çankaya Köşkü, Ankara	April 16–17, 2014
(Turkey) President Recep Tayyip Erdoğan	(Latvia) President Andris Bērziņš	Riga Castle, Riga	October 22–23, 2014
(Turkey) Minister of Foreign Affairs Mevlüt Çavuşoğlu	(Latvia) Minister of Foreign Affairs Edgars Rinkēvičs	Riga Castle, Riga	May 16, 2019
(Latvia) Minister of Foreign Affairs Edgars Rinkēvičs	(Turkey) Minister of Foreign Affairs Mevlüt Çavuşoğlu	Ankara	August 16, 2022

== Economic relations ==
Trade volume between the two countries was 398 million USD in 2016 (Turkish exports/imports: 196/202 million USD).

== Resident diplomatic missions ==
- Latvia has an embassy in Ankara.
- Turkey has an embassy in Riga.

== See also ==
- Foreign relations of Latvia
- Foreign relations of Turkey
- Turkey-EU relations
  - Accession of Turkey to the EU
- NATO-EU relations
