= Denmark–Turkey relations =

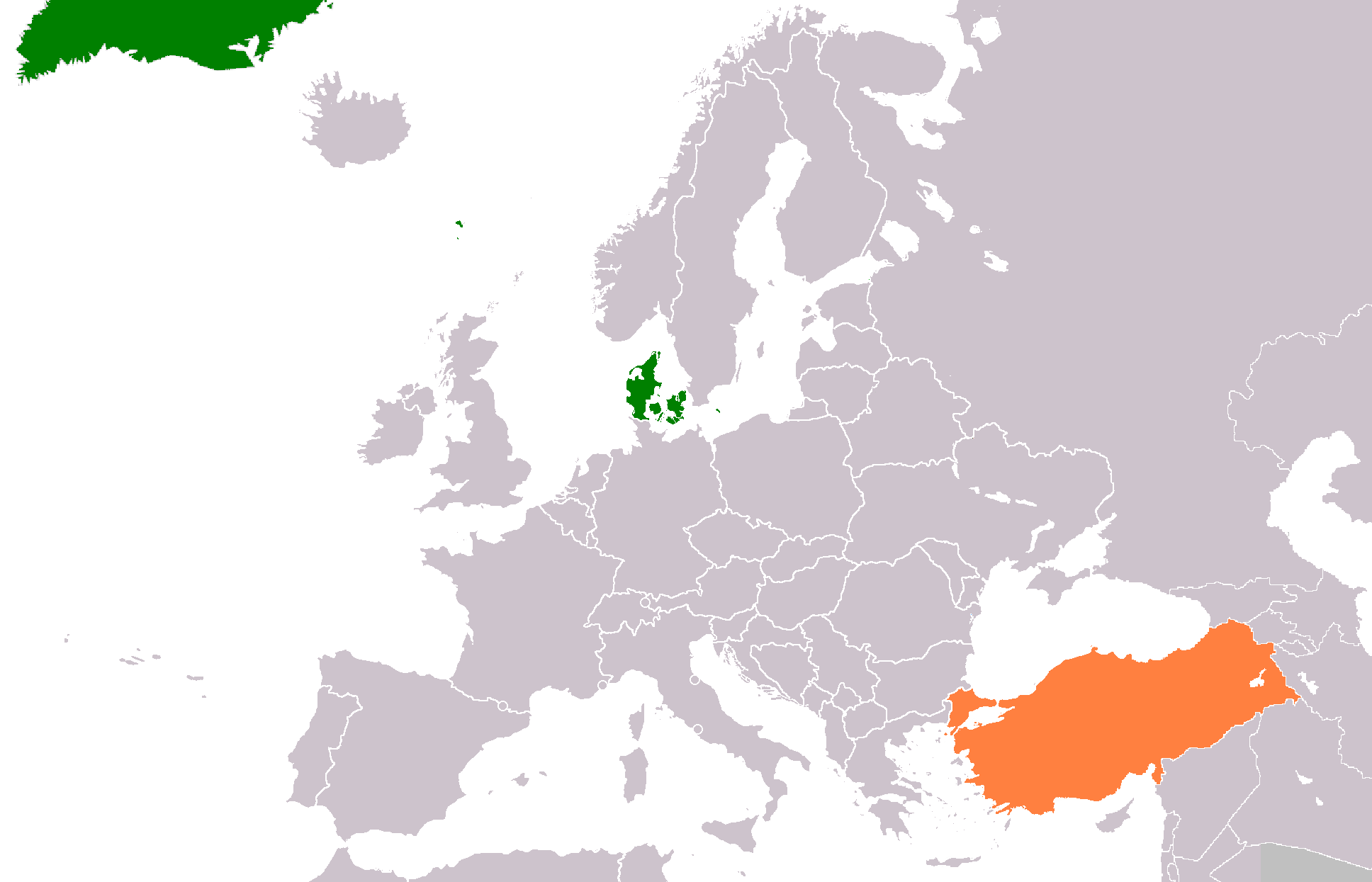
- Denmark: Turkey

Denmark–Turkey relations are the current and historical relations between Denmark and Turkey. Denmark has an embassy in Ankara, and Turkey has an embassy in Copenhagen. Both countries are members of NATO and OSCE and COE. Diplomatic relations between Denmark and Turkey were put under pressure in 2014 because of the Jyllands-Posten Muhammad cartoons controversy and the Roj TV affair (Roj TV's broadcasting license was suspended by the Supreme Court in Denmark on February 27, 2014). Denmark is a member of the EU, Turkey is EU candidate.

== History ==
These relations date back 250 years and actually started in the field of trade in the 18th century. On 14 October 1756, an Agreement of Friendship and Trade was signed by the Sultan Osman III and the King Frederick V. In 1758, Denmark has appointed an extraordinary representative to the Ottoman Empire.

=== Thirty Years' War ===
From 1618 to 1648, Denmark and the Ottoman Empire fought together against the Holy Roman Empire as allies, from 1618 to 1629. In 1643, Denmark aligned with the Catholic powers against Ottoman Empire and Sweden.

=== Great Northern War ===
In the Great Northern War, Denmark and the Ottoman Empire were at war against each other.

=== French Revolutionary Wars ===
In the War of the Second Coalition, Denmark and the Ottoman Empire were at war against each other.

=== Napoleonic Wars ===
Both Denmark, France and the Ottoman Empire were allies during the Napoleonic Wars from 1803 to 1815, against United Kingdom, Austria, Russia and Sweden.

=== 20th century ===
During the Turkish–Armenian War in 1920, Denmark acted as a mediator in the war between Armenia and Turkey.

Denmark officially recognized the Republic of Türkiye with the "Treaty of Friendship between the Republic of Türkiye and the Kingdom of Denmark" signed on 26 January 1925.

A commercial agreement was signed in Ankara in 1926. A Treaty of Establishment, Commerce and Navigation was signed between Denmark and Turkey in 1930. In 1932, both countries signed a conciliation treaty in Geneva, Switzerland. In 1948, a payment agreement were signed.

On 26 November 1999, a "Joint Action Plan" cooperation in politics, security and defense was signed when Turkish Foreign Minister Ismail Cem visited Denmark. In October 2021, in the wake of the appeal for the release of Turkish activist Osman Kavala signed by 10 western countries, Turkish president Recep Tayyip Erdoğan ordered his foreign minister to declare the Danish ambassador persona non grata, alongside the other 9 ambassadors. Following a statement by the ambassadors, reiterating their compliance with Article 41 of the Vienna Convention on Diplomatic Relations regarding the diplomatic duty not to interfere in host states’ internal affairs, President Erdoğan decided to not expel the ambassadors.

== Cartoon crisis ==
Bilateral relations between Denmark and Turkey were strained, when Danish newspaper Jyllandsposten published cartoons of Muhammed. Turkish Prime Minister Recep Tayyip Erdoğan condemned the publication, and criticized Denmark. Erdoğan was quoted in the Turkish press saying: "Caricatures of prophet Muhammad are an attack against our spiritual values. There should be a limit of freedom of press."

== Roj TV affair ==
Turkey claims the channel is a mouthpiece for the Kurdistan Workers Party, who is recognized as a terrorist organizations by Turkey, The USA and the EU, and have lobbied the Danish government to revoke Roj TV's broadcasting license. A Turkish Foreign Ministry official stated: "We know for sure that Roj TV is part of the PKK, a terrorist organization... [The PKK] is listed as a terrorist organization by the EU. Denmark is a member of the EU, and we would expect that the broadcasting organization of a terrorist group would not be given a free pass." While the station's general manager, Manouchehr Tahsili Zonoozi, an Iranian Kurd, acknowledges that the station maintains contact with the PKK, he characterizes it as an independent Kurdish broadcaster, which is not under the control of the PKK. The Turkish authorities have repeatedly made formal complaints to the Danish Radio and Television Board regarding Roj TV, but to date none of the complaints has been upheld by the Board, who have ruled that the TV channel has not violated any rules over which the Board has regulatory power.

As part of the United States diplomatic cables leak of November 2010, a diplomatic message surfaced that referred to a Turkish representative's claim that, "as part of the 2009 POTUS-brokered deal that had overcome Turkish objections to the appointment of Anders Fogh Rasmussen as NATO Secretary General, Denmark had promised to clarify its legal requirements prerequiste [sic] to acceding to Turkey's request for the closure of Roj TV"

Roj TV's broadcasting license was suspended by the Supreme Court in Denmark on February 27, 2014.

== Economic relations ==
The economic relations favours the Turkish exports. In 2004, Turkish exports to Denmark rose by 40%. The current value of trade stands at $979.6m US dollars.

== Resident diplomatic missions ==
- Denmark has an embassy in Ankara and consulate-general in Istanbul.
- Turkey has an embassy in Copenhagen.
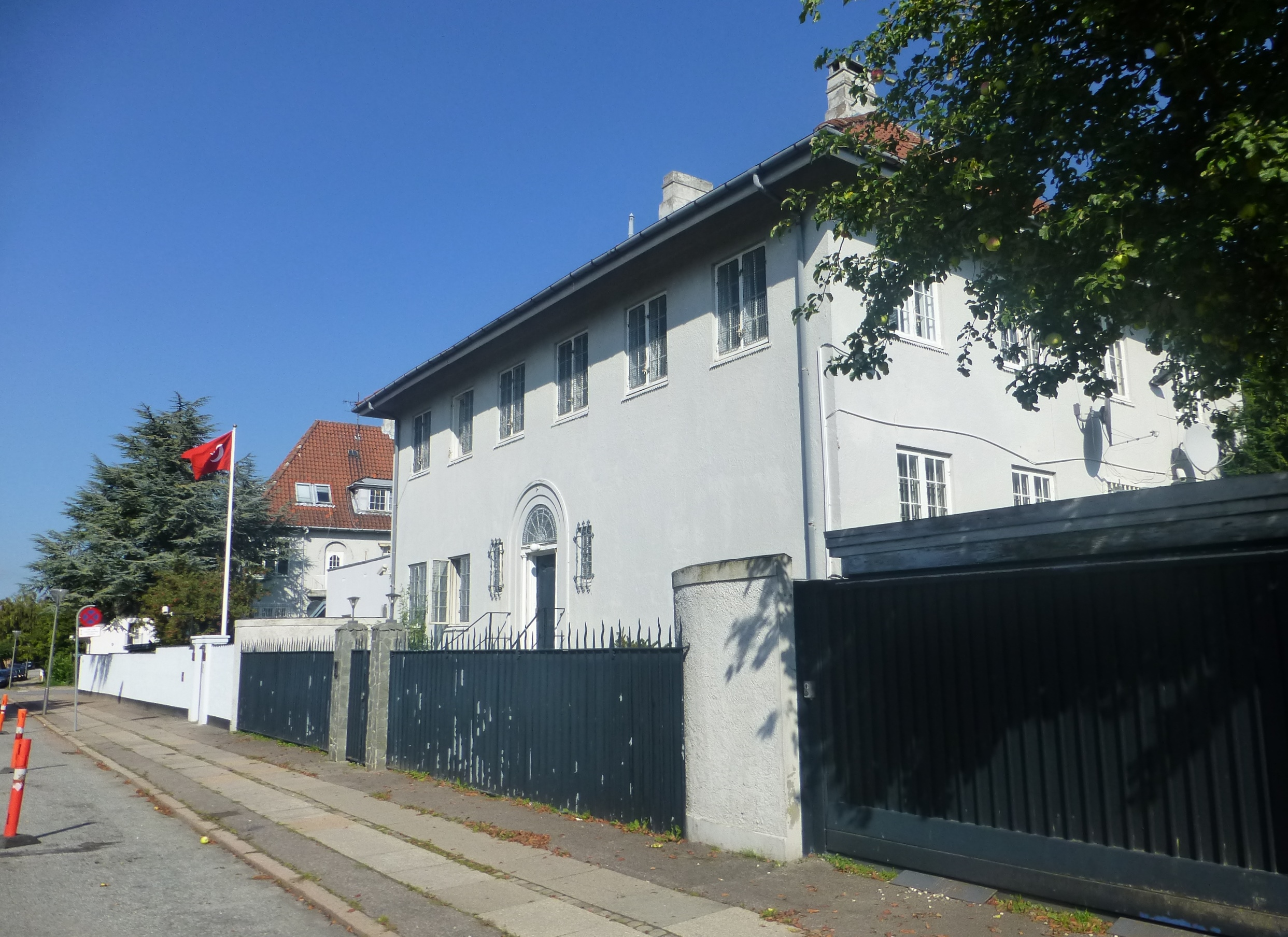
Embassy of Turkey in Copenhagen

== Honorary consulates ==
Denmark also has an honorary consulates in Alanya, Antalya, Gaziantep, İzmir, Marmaris and Mersin. Turkey also has an honorary consulates in Aarhus.

== See also ==
- Foreign relations of Denmark
- Foreign relations of Turkey
- Turkey-EU relations
  - Accession of Turkey to the EU
- NATO-EU relations
- Turks in Denmark
- Turks in Europe
