= Turks in Italy =

Ethnic group in Italy

Total population
- Estimates vary because official Italian statistics do not collect data on ethnicity. 30,000 to 40,000 (2009 academic estimate): Turkish citizens: 50,000 (2020 estimate) Turkish minority of Moena: unknown

Regions with significant populations
- Milan; Como; Rome; Turin; Venice; Brescia

Languages
- Turkish and Italian

Religion
- Sunni Islam; Alevism; irreligious; Roman Catholicism

Turks in Italy, also referred to as Turkish Italians or Italian Turks, (Turkish: İtalya Türkleri) refers to Italian citizens of full or partial Turkish origin. Although some Turks came to Italy as Ottoman migrants, the majority of Italian Turks descend from the Republic of Turkey; moreover, there has also been Turkish migration from other post-Ottoman countries including ethnic Turkish communities that have moved to Italy from the Balkans (e.g. from Bulgaria, Greece, Kosovo, North Macedonia and Romania), the island of Cyprus, North Africa (especially from Egypt and Tunisia) and, more recently, Iraq and Syria.

== History ==
=== Turkish migration from the Ottoman Empire ===
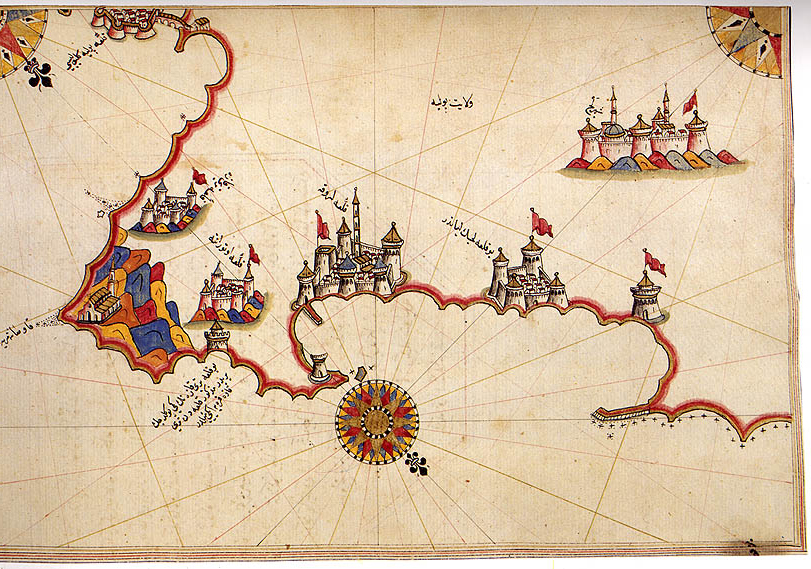
Map of Otranto by Piri Reis.

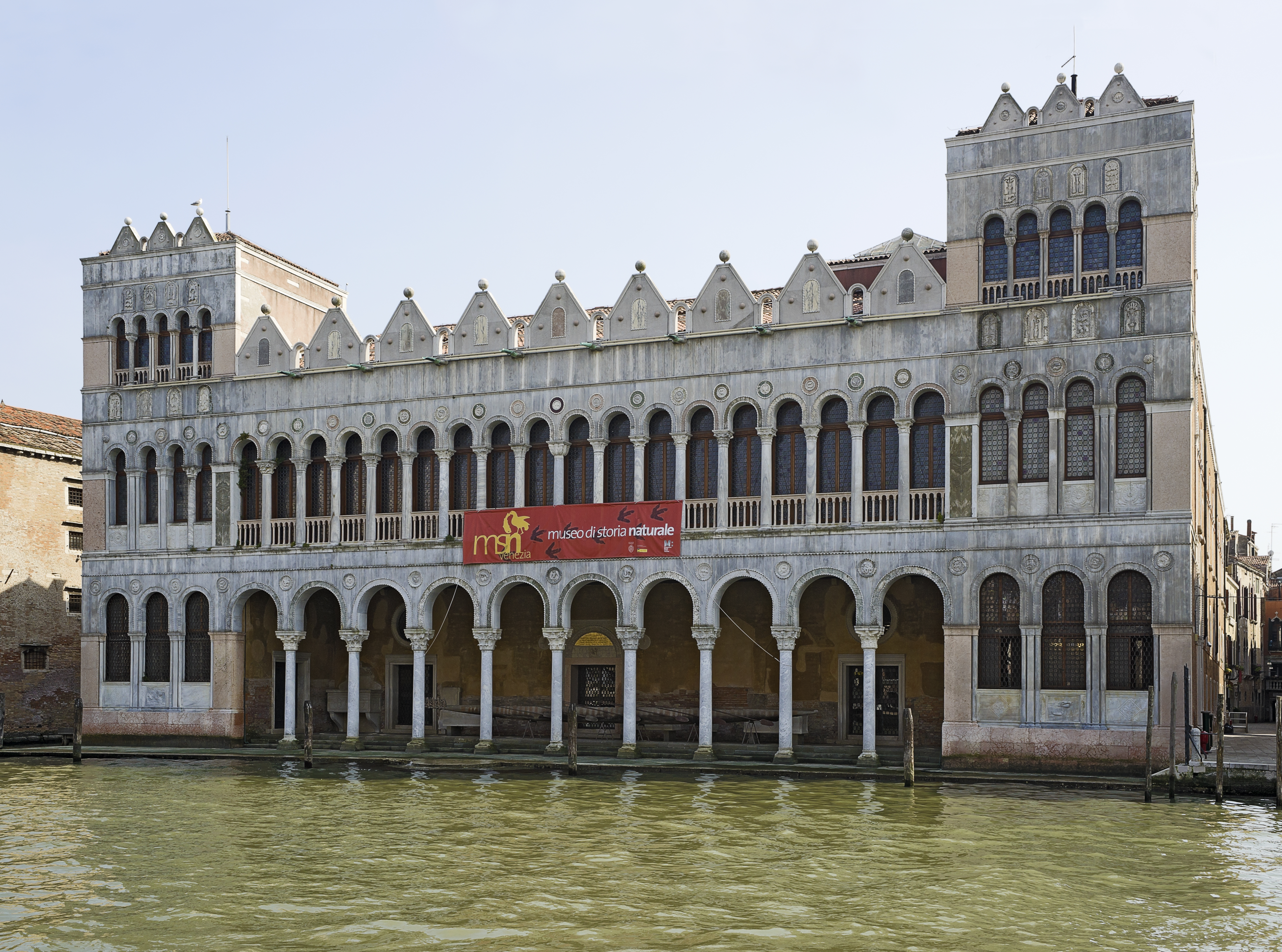
Fondaco dei Turchi, The Turks' Inn.

During the 15th century, the Ottoman Empire was expanding mightily in southeastern Europe. It completed the invasion and occupation of the Byzantine Empire in 1453 under Sultan Mehmet II by conquering Constantinople and Galata. It seized Genoa's last bastions in the Black Sea in 1475 and Venice's Greek colony of Euboea in 1479. Turkish troops invaded the Friuli region in northeastern Italy in 1479 and again in 1499–1503. The Apulian harbor town of Otranto, located about 100 kilometers southeast of Brindisi, was seized in 1480, but the Turks were routed there in 1481 when Mehmet died and a war for his succession broke out. Cem Sultan, pretender to the Ottoman throne, was defeated despite being supported by the pope; he fled with his family to the Kingdom of Naples, where his male descendants were bestowed with the title of Principe de Sayd by the Pope in 1492. They lived in Naples until the 17th century and in Sicily until 1668 before relocating to Malta.

From the early 17th century through to 1838, the Fondaco dei Turchi served as a one-building-ghetto for Venice's Ottoman Turkish population (thus "dei Turchi"). The fondaco then served as a combination home, warehouse, and market for the Turkish traders. When the Venetian Republic was conquered and abolished by Napoleon Boneparte in 1797, the Turkish traders continued to live in the palazzo until 1838.

==== Turks of Moena ====
In 2011 the Italian Turkologist Ermanno Visintainer published a study on the Turks of Moena entitled "La Presenza Turca Dimenticata in Italia: I Turchi Di Moena". He has argued that the descendants of Ottoman Turks who settled in the region during the seventeenth century have been "forgotten" in Italy. Nonetheless, Moena is often referred to as "Rione della Turchia" (The Turkish Region), owing to a legendary Ottoman soldier who arrived in the town during the Battle of Vienna in 1683. Known as Hasan or Il Turco, he was declared a hero by the locals for revolting against the unfair taxes of the Duchy of Augsburg. He married a local woman and had several children. Thereafter, his memory was kept alive by his children and grandchildren and the local inhabitants experienced a certain degree of Turkification. Indeed, today the local inhabitants continue to celebrate the town's Ottoman-Turkish history every summer with a parade by dressing in traditional Ottoman Turkish clothes and displaying Turkish flags throughout the town.

=== Turkish migration from the Balkans ===
==== Bulgaria ====
Turkish Bulgarians first began to emigrate to Italy in the late 1980s due to the so-called “Revival Process” under Bulgaria's communist rule (1984–1989). The aggressive Bulgarisation policies targeted towards the ethnic Turkish minority were resisted by many leading them to be sent to prison or the Belene labour camp followed by deportation from Bulgaria; consequently, many Turkish Bulgarians fled to Turkey and Western Europe, with some arriving in Italy.

The social network of the first wave of political emigration of Turkish Bulgarians became the basis of labour migration to Western Europe after the collapse of the totalitarian regime in Bulgaria in late 1989. Thus, the preservation of kinship has opened an opportunity for many Turkish Bulgarian to continue to migrate to the European countries such as Italy.

More recently, during the 2007 enlargement of the European Union, Bulgaria became an EU member which resulted in Turkish Bulgarian migration increasing further due to their freedom of movement rights as EU citizens. Thus, Turkish Bulgarian emigration to Italy in the twenty-first century has been dictated by the economic situation and the stagnation of the labour market in Bulgaria.

==== North Macedonia ====
The Turkish Macedonian minority group has joined other Macedonian citizens in migrating to Italy, most having arrived during the Breakup of Yugoslavia. In 2021, Furkan Çako, who is a former Macedonian minister and member of the Security Council, urged Turkish Macedonians living in Italy to participate in North Macedonia's 2021 census.

==== Romania ====
Since the early 2000s there has been a significant decrease in the population of the Turkish Romanian minority group due to the admission of Romania into the European Union and the subsequent relaxation of travelling and migration regulations. Hence, Turkish Romanians, especially from the Dobruja region, have joined other Romanian citizens in migrating to Italy.

==== Serbia (Sandžak and – if included in Serbia – Kosovo, in particular) ====
Since 2010s, many Turkish refugees from Serbia (especially from either Sandžak or Kosovo – if the latter is included in said country) found asylum in Italy.

=== Turkish migration from the Levant ===
==== Cyprus ====
Turkish Cypriots began to leave the island of Cyprus for Western Europe in large numbers due to economic and political reasons in the 20th century, especially after the Cyprus crisis of 1963–64 and then the 1974 Cypriot coup d'état carried out by the Greek military junta which was followed by the reactionary Turkish invasion of the island. More recently, with the 2004 enlargement of the European Union, Turkish Cypriots have had the right to live and work across the European Union, including in Italy, as EU citizens.

The TRNC provides assistance to its Turkish Cypriots residents living in Italy via the TRNC Representative Office located in Rome; in addition, the office in Rome promotes friendly relations between the TRNC and Italy, as well as economic and cultural relations.

== Demographics ==
According to the Istituto Nazionale di Statistica there were 19,068 people from Turkey living in Italy in 2010. However, in 2009 Dr. Yasemin Çakırer estimated that there was 30,000 to 40,000 people of Turkish origin living in Italy. The majority of Turks live in the North-West and North-East of Italy, particularly in Rome, Milan and Venice.

== Notable people ==
- Simon Atumano, was the Bishop of Gerace in Calabria and was of Greco-Turkish origin
- Özalp Babaoğlu, Professor of computer science at the University of Bologna
- Rayyan Baniya, football player (Turkish mother and Beninese father)
- Carlita (musician)
- Leyla Gencer, operatic soprano (Turkish father and Polish mother)
- Mehmet Günsur, model, actor and producer
- Fiore de Henriquez, sculptor (Turkish and Russian mother; Spanish father)
- Antuan Ilgit, Catholic Jesuit priest who converted from Sunni Islam (Turkish German origin)
- Afef Jnifen, model and actress (Turkish Tunisian mother and Tunisian father)
- Julian Ocleppo, tennis player (Turkish American mother and Italian father)
- Ferzan Özpetek, film director and screenwriter
- Romalı Perihan, soprano and model
- Hugo Pratt, comic book creator
- Yvonne Sanson, actress (Turkish mother and French-Russian father)
- Cem Sultan, Ottoman prince
- Francesco Taskayali, pianist and composer (Turkish father and Italitan mother)

== See also ==
- Ottoman invasion of Otranto
- Convention between Italy and Turkey, 1932
- Mehmet Ali Ağca
- Süpermenler
- Turks in Europe
  - Turks in Austria
  - Turks in France
  - Turks in Switzerland
- Turks in Libya
- Turks in Tunisia
- Scala dei Turchi
- Il turco in Italia
- Italy–Turkey relations

== Bibliography ==
- Çakırer, Yasemin (2009), "Göç Trafiğinde Araftakiler: İtalya'daki Türkler", in Erdoğan, Murat (ed.), Yurtdışındaki Türkler: 50. Yılında Göç ve Uyum, Orion Kitabevi, ISBN 978-9944-769-53-2.
- Visintainer, Ermanno (2011), "La Presenza Turca Dimenticata in Italia: I Turchi Di Moena [The Forgotten Turks in Italy: Moena Turks]" (PDF), ORSAM, vol. 76, ISBN 978-9944-5684-6-3
