= Turks in Spain =

Spanish Turks
İspanya'daki Türkler
- (Turkey) (Spain)

Total population
- Turkish citizens only: 10,000 (2015 estimate) (excludes Spanish-born and naturalized citizens of Turkish origin; also excludes Turkish Bulgarians, Turkish Cypriots, Turkish Romanians etc.)

Regions with significant populations
- Barcelona; Madrid; Balearic Islands

Languages
- Spanish, Turkish

Religion
- Predominantly Sunni Islam; Minority Alevism, Christianity, other religions, or irreligious

Related ethnic groups
- Turks in Italy, Turks in France, Turks in Mexico

Turks in Spain (Turkish: İspanya'daki Türkler), or Spanish Turks, refers to ethnic Turks who have emigrated to Spain as well as the growing Spanish-born community with full or partial Turkish origins. The Turkish Spanish community includes descendants who originate from the Republic of Turkey as well as other post-Ottoman modern nation-states, especially ethnic Turkish communities from the Balkans (e.g. Bulgaria and Romania), and to a lesser extent from the island of Cyprus, and other parts of the Levant.

== History ==
=== Turkish migration from the Balkans ===
==== Bulgaria ====
The migration waves of Turkish Bulgarians to Spain began as early as the late 1980s. It was a consequence of the ongoing “Revival Process” under communist rule (1984–1989). The aggressive Bulgarisation policies pursued by the communist rule was met with resistance by the Turkish population with many sent to prison or the Belene labour camp and then extradited from Bulgaria; consequently, many Turkish Bulgarians fled to Turkey and Western Europe, including Spain. Since the early 2000s, there has been a significant increase in the number of citizens from Bulgaria who have emigrated to Spain. Among these immigrants are ethnic Turkish Bulgarians who, alongside ethnic Bulgarians (as well as Pomaks, Armenians and other minority groups), have settled in Catalonia, Madrid, Alicante and Valencia.

==== Romania ====
Between 2002 and 2011 there was a significant decrease in the population of the Turkish Romanian minority group due to the admission of Romania into the European Union and the subsequent relaxation of the travelling and migration regulations. Hence, Turkish Romanians, especially from the Dobruja region, have joined other Romanian citizens (e.g. ethnic Romanians, Tatars, etc.) in migrating mostly to Spain, Germany, Austria, Italy, and the UK.

=== Turkish migration from the diaspora ===
There has also been ethnic Turkish migration to Spain from the modern Turkish diaspora, most notably British Turks and German Turks who have arrived in Spain as British and German citizens.

== Demographics ==
The majority of Turks in Spain are recent immigrants and mainly live in Catalonia (especially in Barcelona) followed by the Community of Madrid and the Valencian Community (especially in Alicante). Smaller communities have also been formed in Andalusia and the Balearic Islands.

== Organisations and associations ==
- Alliance of Civilizations, a forum sponsored by Turkey and Spain
- Casa Turca

== Notable Turks in Spain ==
- Ümit Hussein, literary translator and interpreter (born in the UK; Turkish Cypriot parents)
- Hussein Salem, businessman (born in Egypt; Turkish mother and Arab father)
- Sercan Sararer, football player (born in Germany; Turkish father and Spanish Catalan mother)
- Selen Us, Designer and wife of Vance Joy who is an Australian singer, songwriter, musician.

== See also ==
- Spain–Turkey relations
- La Pasión Turca
- Immigration to Spain
- Turks in Europe
  - British Turks
  - Turks in France
  - Turks in Italy
