= Italy–Turkey relations =

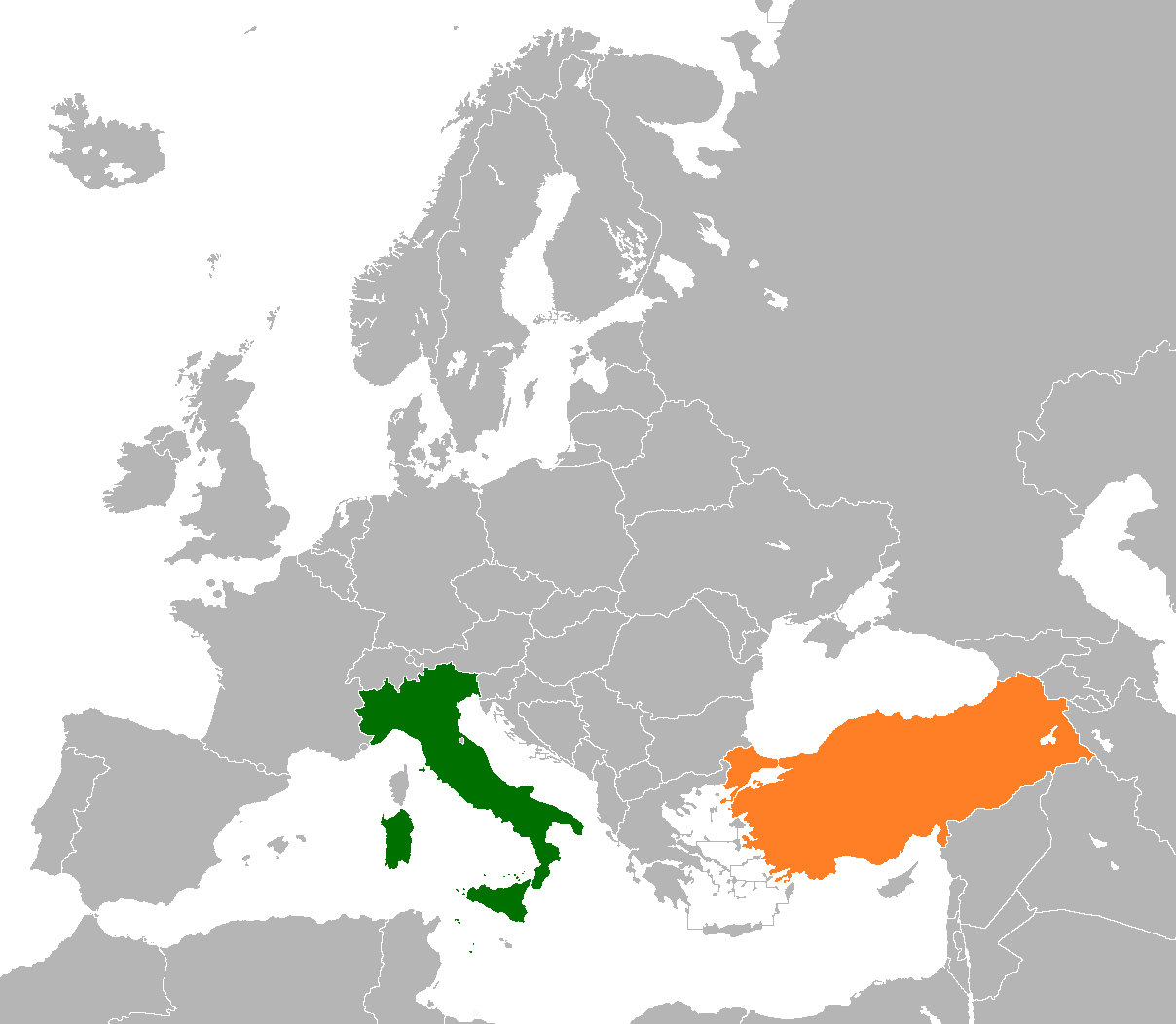
- Italy: Turkey

Diplomatic mission
- Embassy of Italy, Ankara: Embassy of Turkey, Rome

Relations between the Italian Republic and Republic of Türkiye date back centuries in the form of various predecessor states. Italy has an embassy in Ankara and consulates-general in Istanbul and a consulate in İzmir. Turkey has an embassy in Rome and a consulate-general in Milan. Both countries are members of NATO and the Union for the Mediterranean and have active diplomatic relations. Italy is an EU member and Turkey is an EU candidate.

== History ==
=== Ottoman relations with pre-unitary Italian States ===
Prior to the Unification of Italy, several Italian states, most notably the Republic of Venice, fought wars against the Ottoman Empire in conflicts such as the Ottoman–Venetian wars (1396–1718) and others.

The Ottoman Empire attempted to invade Italy in 1480. The Ottoman invasion of Otranto occurred between 1480 and 1481 at the Italian city of Otranto in Apulia, southern Italy. Forces of the Ottoman Empire invaded and laid siege to the city and its citadel. After the refusal to surrender, the city was taken and about 12,000 inhabitants (all the male population) were killed and the others were enslaved: moreover, more than 800 inhabitants were beheaded after the city had been captured. The Martyrs of Otranto are still celebrated in Italy. A year later the Ottoman garrison surrendered the city following a siege by Christian forces and the intervention of Papal forces led by the Genoese Paolo Fregoso.

The Ottomans also briefly held Otranto once more after conquering it in 1537. Ottoman troops operated in Italy and surrounding islands as part of France's war to subdue the region.

=== Ottoman Empire – Kingdom of Italy relations ===
The Ottoman Empire begun its first diplomatic mission to Italy in 1856, shortly before the establishment of the Kingdom of Italy, by sending Ambassador Rüstem Pasha. Since then, Turkey has had a constant presence in Italy throughout both their embassy in Rome and their consulates in Milan and Naples.

Starting from the late 19th century, Italy had a territorial claim over Ottoman Libya. This claim dated back to the Ottoman Empire's defeat by Russia during the war of 1877–1878 and subsequent discussions after the Congress of Berlin in 1878, in which France and the United Kingdom had agreed to the French occupation of Tunisia and British control over Cyprus respectively, which were both parts of the declining Ottoman Empire. When Italian diplomats hinted about possible opposition by their government, the French replied that Tripoli would have been a counterpart for Italy, which made a secret agreement with the British government in February 1887 via a diplomatic exchange of notes. The agreement stipulated that Italy would support British control in Egypt, and that Britain would likewise support Italian influence in Libya.

In 1902, a diplomatic crisis between Italy and the Ottoman Empire took place. The crisis began due to the Ottomans failing to prevent attacks by Turkish Arabs on Italian sambuks. When the Ottoman Empire refused to take precautions to prevent these attacks after repeated Italian threats, Italian warships bombarded Port Midi from 31 October onwards. On 10 November, the Ottoman Empire capitulated and agreed to take measures to curb piracy as well as pay an indemnity, ending the crisis. Also in 1902, Italy and France had signed a secret treaty which accorded freedom of intervention in Tripolitania and Morocco.

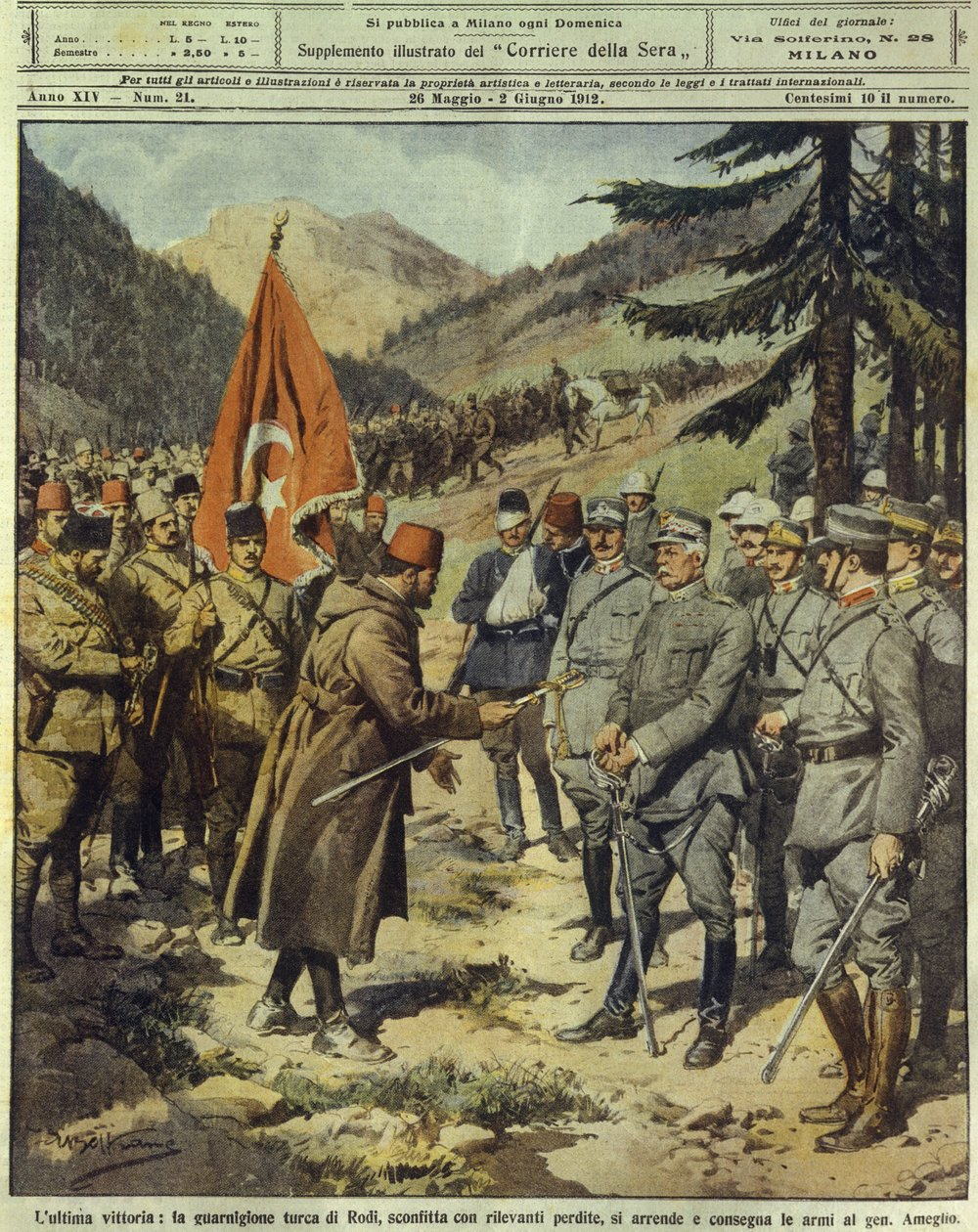
16 May 1912: surrender of the Turkish garrison in Rhodes to the Italian general Giovanni Ameglio near Psithos.

From 1911 to 1912, Italy and the Ottoman Empire fought a war over the Turkish provinces of Tripolitana and Cyrenaica, with the former emerging as the victor. During the conflict, Italian forces also occupied the Dodecanese islands in the Aegean Sea. Italy agreed to return the Dodecanese to the Ottoman Empire in the Treaty of Ouchy in 1912. However, the vagueness of the text, combined with subsequent adverse events unfavourable to the Ottoman Empire (the outbreak of the Balkan Wars and World War I), allowed a provisional Italian administration of the islands, and Turkey eventually renounced all claims on these islands in Article 15 of the 1923 Treaty of Lausanne.

Though both states were initially neutral during World War I, the Ottoman Empire joined the Central Powers in November 1914 and Italy joined the Entente in May 1915; Italy officially declared war on the Ottoman Empire on 21 August 1915. Both states committed troops to the Macedonian front.

=== Turkish War of Independence ===
During the Turkish War of Independence (1919–1923), Italy occupied Constantinople and a part of southwestern Anatolia but never fought the Turkish Army directly. During its occupation Italian troops protected Turkish civilians, who were living in the areas occupied by the Italian army, from Greek troops and accepted Turkish refugees who had to flee from the regions invaded by the Greek army. In July 1921 Italy began to withdraw its troops from southwestern Anatolia.

The Convention between Italy and Turkey, signed in Ankara on 4 January 1932, by the Italian Plenipotentiary, Ambassador Pompeo Aloisi, and the Turkish foreign minister Tevfik Rüştü Aras, settled a dispute that had arisen in the aftermath of the Treaty of Lausanne of 1923, about the sovereignty over a number of small islets and the delimitation of the territorial waters between the coast of Anatolia and the island of Kastellórizo, which was an Italian possession since 1921. Through the convention, the islets situated inside the bay of the harbour of Kastellorizo, along with the islands of Rho and Strongili further off, were assigned to Italy, while all other islets in the surrounding area were assigned to Turkey.

Italy wasn't content with its post-WWI gains and its share of the Ottoman Empire. As such, it sought to secretly destabilize the Turkish Republic from within, in hopes of territorial gains.

=== Fascist Italy and World War II ===
Italy, under the Fascist regime of Benito Mussolini was viewed as a threat by Turkey. Italy also saw Turkey as a target for colonial expansion. One of Italy's main objectives in Turkey was taking over Antalya and the surrounding region.

In 1925, Mussolini secretly concentrated troops in the Dodecanese Islands, aiming for a coup de main on the Anatolian coast. However, the Turkish government was informed on time and mobilized their troops in response. This event did not escalate further.

In 1926, Mussolini met with Neville Chamberlain. In the meeting, "they agreed on the probable eventual collapse of the Kemalist regime in Turkey", while also agreeing on a subsequent "Italian intervention in Anatolia". Mussolini believed that the Mosul question between Great Britain and Turkey would cause a war between the two countries, giving Italy the excuse of colonizing parts of Anatolia.

The Fascist government was extremely sympathetic to anti-Turkish movements. In May 1927, it was reported that Vahan Papazian was working with Kurdish revolutionary committees and had reached understandings with the Italian and Greek governments. Italy proceeded to financially support the Xoybûn during the Ararat rebellion. In 31 March 1928, Papazian reached a secret agreement with the Italian government for money and weapons. Funds for publishing a Kurdish newspaper in Aleppo were also provided by Italy. Indeed, Mussolini sought to foster a united front between Armenians and Kurds against Turkey, in order to gain a foothold in Anatolia. Çerkes Reşit, a Circassian anti-Kemalist leader who supported the rebellion, believed that Greece might be persuaded to join as well, as long as it was offered concessions in Eastern Thrace.

The aims for Italy were the following, as described by Garo Sassouni in a letter to the ARF Bureau:

# To take over the Kurdish mandate.

1. An Armenian state comprised of Yerevan, Trebizond, and Northern Kurdistan would also be handed over as a mandate to Italy, which will then form a police force from local population to rule over this country.
2. Armenians can help Italy to take over the Syrian mandate from the French.
3. Italy could also employ Armenian and Kurdish forces to rule over its mandate in Antalya, Kushadas [?,[Perhaps Kushadagh?], and the Aegean Sea islands and also use these forces to support its efforts in case a new war erupts.

In 30 May 1928, the two countries signed a "Treaty of Neutrality and Reconciliation". As such, Italy stopped overtly harbouring ambitions of expansion into Turkish territory.

However, in 1934, Italian fortifications in the Dodecanese kept piling up and, a day after signing the Rome Protocols in 17 March 1934, Mussolini delivered a speech which indirectly included his "most overt threats against Turkey" so far. In a later statement, Mussolini denied the fact that he alluded to Turkey, slightly reassuring the Turkish government, which nevertheless increased military spending as a result. However, Italy kept secretly supporting Kurdish-Armenian co-operation and attempts for a rebellion as late as 1935. The Italian intelligence agency approached Celadet Alî Bedirxan in Beirut and offered him residence in Rome to start his Kurdish insurrectionist activities from there. Kamuran Alî Bedirxan and several Armenian Revolutionary Federation members met with the Italian ambassador in Lebanon to discuss the possibility of a new rebellion and Italy's support of it.

In 1936, Mussolini stated that "Italy has friendship treaties with Greece and Turkey and intends to follow them". Italy proceeded to invade Greece in October 1940.

The Refah tragedy was a maritime disaster that took place during World War II, in June 1941, when the cargo steamer Refah of neutral Turkey, carrying Turkish military personnel from Mersin in Turkey to Port Said, Egypt, was sunk in eastern Mediterranean waters by a torpedo fired from an unidentified submarine. Of the 200 passengers and crew aboard, only 32 survived. A report published by the Italian Navy gives coordinates where the Italian submarine Ondina attacked vessels. The site of Refah's sinking matches that information. No country claimed responsibility for the attack on the Turkish ship.

On 18 June 1941, Nazi Germany and Turkey signed the German–Turkish Treaty of Friendship. On 29 April 1942, the "Treaty of Neutrality and Reconciliation" expired. Later, on the summer of 1942, Operation Gertrude, a plan by Germany and Italy to invade Turkey, was put into place, but was later abandoned due to the significance of Axis losses in World War II.

=== Post-WWII ===
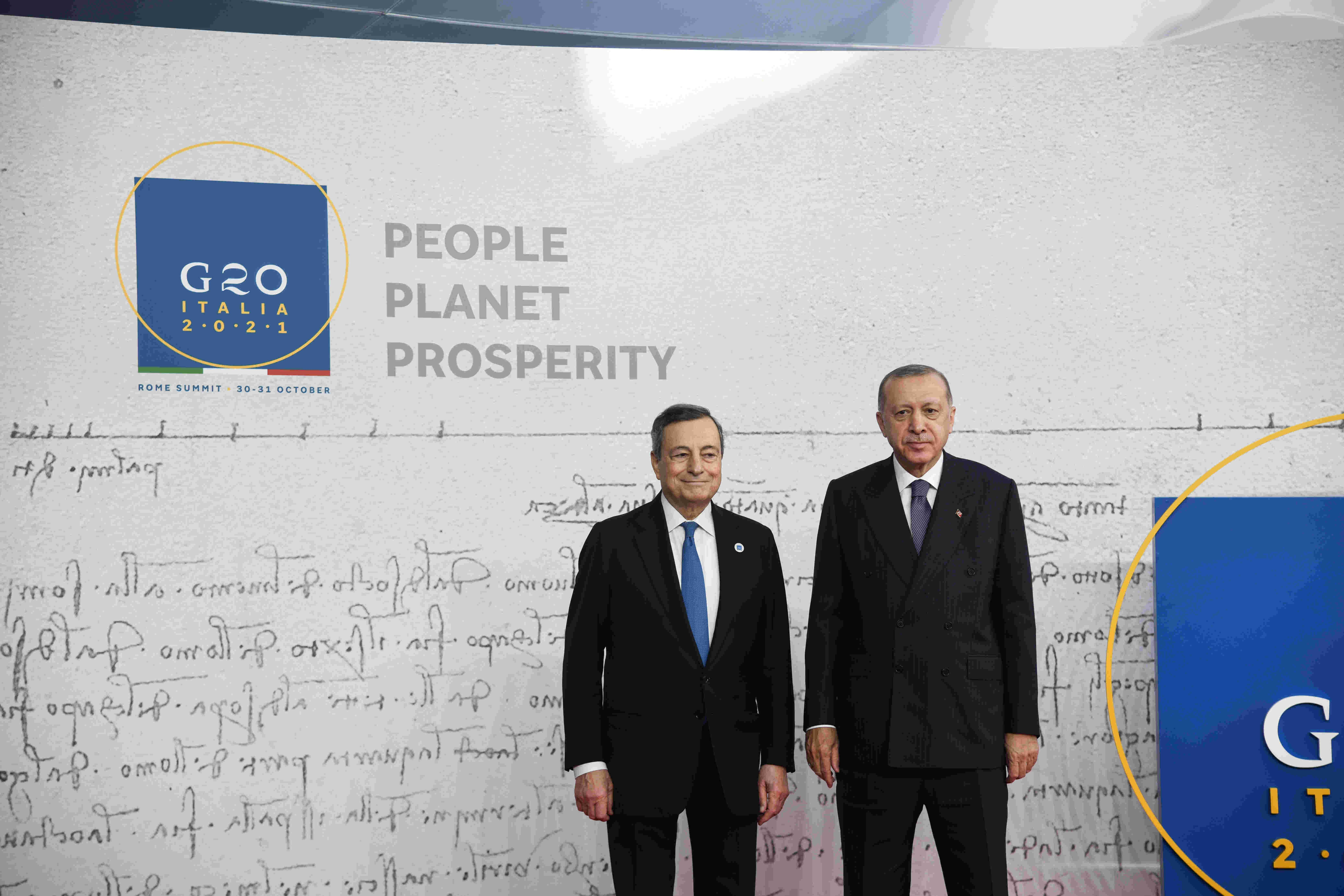
Italian Prime Minister Mario Draghi with Turkish President Recep Tayyip Erdoğan on 2021 G20 Rome summit in Rome, Italy 30 October 2021

Italy, a founding member of NATO, supported Turkey's accession to the organisation. In July 1951, an Italian representative stated: "The Italian Government is of the opinion that [...] there is no doubt that the bastion represented by Asia Minor (Turkey) has the same value for the South Mediterranean sector of NATO as the Scandinavian bastion has for the Northern sector. The loss of the former bastion would drive Atlantic defense back to the Central Mediterranean [...] [and] the defense of the continent would become extremely difficult."

In the 1990s, the diplomatic relations were very tense as Italy refused to extradite Abdullah Öcalan to Turkey, alleging that it was contrary to Italian Law that someone would be extradited into a country in which he would expect the death penalty. Turkey, who has displayed a lot of diplomatic pressure for the extradition, opposed such verdict. The Defense minister of Turkey Ismet Sezgin mentioned that Turkey would review the candidates for an order for attack helicopters worth of 3.5 Billion dollars, for which before the rejection of the extradition the main candidate was the Italian Finmeccanica. Mesut Yilmaz, the Turkish prime minister at the time also threatened that Italy is on track to earn Turkey's "eternal hostility".

Italy's presence in Turkey now consists of an embassy in Ankara, a general consulate in İstanbul, and a consulate in İzmir, together with honorary consulates in Antalya, Bursa, Gaziantep, İskenderun, and Nevşehir, and a Consular Correspondent in Eskişehir. Turkey's presence in Italy now consists of an embassy in Rome, and a General Consulate in Milano. Relations worsened after Italian Foreign Minister Luigi Di Maio condemned the 2019 Turkish offensive into north-eastern Syria, declaring that the offensive against Kurdish forces in Syria is "unacceptable" and calling for an immediate end to the fighting. Italy joined an arms embargo against Turkey, despite previously being Turkey's primary EU weapons supplier.

Following a diplomatic incident dubbed as Sofagate in April 2021, Mario Draghi's remarks describing Recep Tayyip Erdoğan as a "dictator" were heavily criticized by the Turkish Foreign Ministry. Erdogan condemned Draghi remark. As a result, relations deteriorated.

President Recep Tayyip Erdoğan and Italian Prime Minister Giorgia Meloni met in Rome for the Fourth Turkey-Italy Intergovernmental Summit, signing 11 agreements in areas such as trade, defense, space, and culture. The leaders emphasized strengthening economic ties, setting a new trade volume target of $40 billion. They discussed defense industry cooperation, potential energy projects, and cultural collaborations, including co-hosting the 2032 UEFA European Football Championship. Additionally, Baykar and Leonardo signed an agreement for aerospace cooperation.

== Intercultural influences ==
=== Italian culture in Turkey ===
Istanbul is home to one of the Italian Cultural Institutes opened throughout the world by the Italian Ministry of Foreign Affairs. The institute, among other cultural activities, offers Italian language courses, also offered by a number of Turkish universities, such as Ankara University and Istanbul University.

İzmir and Ankara are hosts to, respectively, the Italian Culture Center "Carlo Goldoni" and the Italian Friendship Association "Casa Italia". Both of these associations engage in the organisation of events promoting Italian culture and of courses teaching the Italian language.

There are a number of Italian schools in Turkey, most of them being in Istanbul. Italian schools in Turkey include kindergartens, elementary, middle, and high schools.

== Immigration ==
It is estimated that there are 30,000 to 40,000 Turks living in Italy.

== Embassies ==
=== Embassy of Turkey in Rome ===
Embassy of Turkey, Rome
- Location: Rome
- Address: Via Palestro, 28
- Coordinates: 41.9064°N 12.5025°E
- Ambassador: Ömer Gücük
- Website: https://roma-be.mfa.gov.tr/

The Embassy of Turkey in Rome (Turkish: Türkiye Cumhuriyeti Roma Büyükelçiliği) is Turkey's diplomatic mission to Italy. It is located at Via Palestro, 28, Rome. The current ambassador is Ömer Gücük. Previous ambassadors include İnal Batu.

The Turkish Embassy in Italy is a diplomatic mission representing the interests of the Turkish government in Italy.

== See also ==
- Foreign relations of Italy
- Foreign relations of Turkey
- EU–Turkey relations
  - Accession of Turkey to the EU
- Turks in Italy
