= Arturo Martini =

Italian sculptor, painter and engraver (1889–1947)

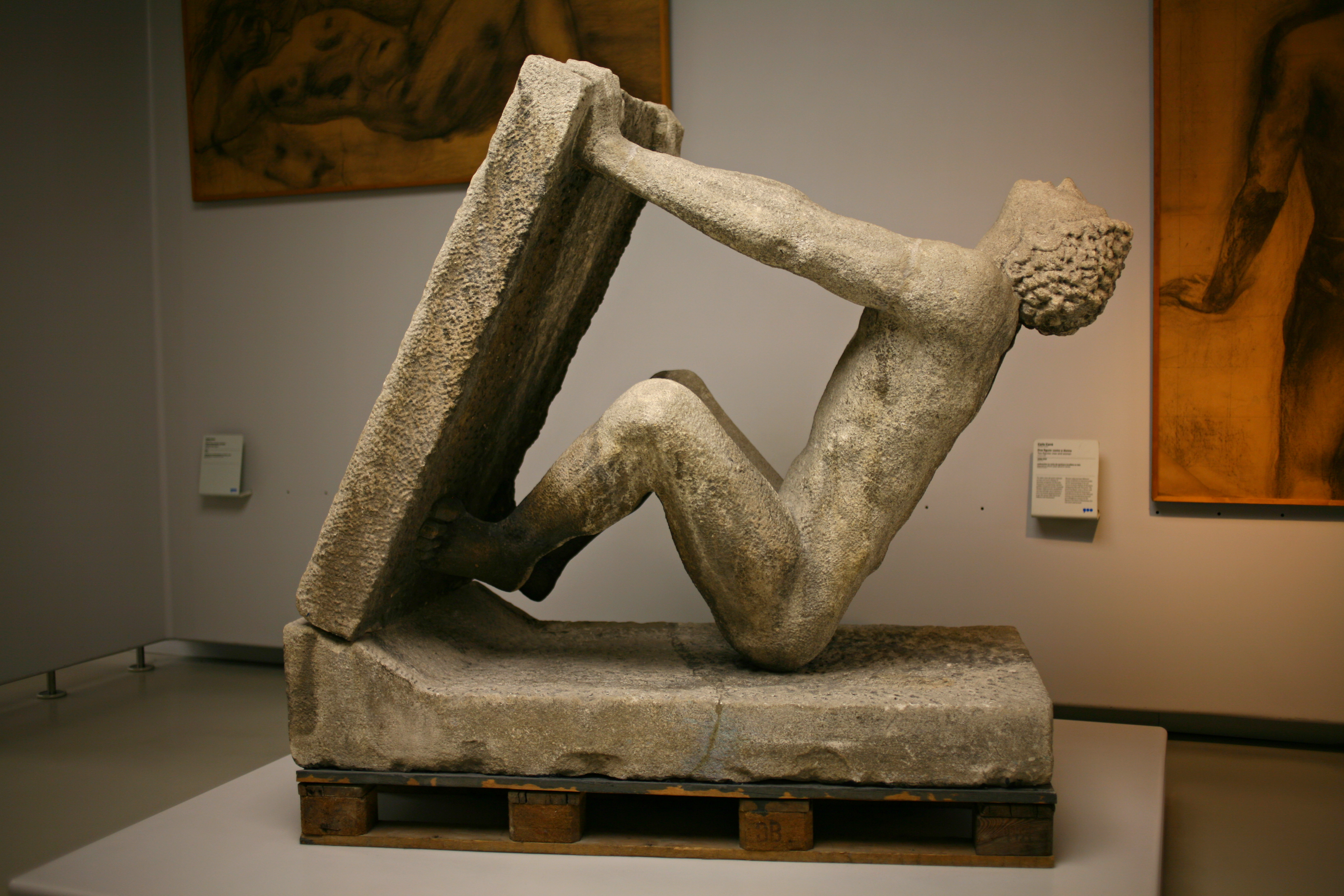
Arturo Martini, I morti di Bligny trasalirebbero, 1935, Milano, Museo del Novecento.

Arturo Martini (1889–1947) was an Italian sculptor between World War I and II. He moved between a very vigorous (almost ancient Roman) classicism and modernism. He was associated with public sculpture in fascist Italy, but later renounced his medium altogether.

== Early life ==
Martini was born in Treviso to a poor family. His father was a cook and his mother a waitress. He dropped out of school at a young age but later took night classes in arts and crafts.

== Futurism ==
Martini seems to have been an active supporter of the Futurist movement between 1914 and 1918. He certainly corresponded with Umberto Boccioni and produced a modernist booklet in 1918. His early works show an archaic tendency, two-dimensionality and polychrome effects

== In Fascist Italy ==
His later works returned to a more traditional style, but with "irony, agility and an eclectic capacity to combine or reinterpret sources". Between the wars, he became the semi-official sculptor of the fascist regime. He was literally overwhelmed by commitments: great monuments and commemorative works for courthouses, churches and universities. Examples include the great bronze at La Sapienza University in Rome and the memorial to the aviator Tito Minniti. He sculpted the monument to the Fallen at the Palazzo delle Poste, Naples.

== Post-war ==
After the fall of Mussolini, feeling that his art had been corrupted, he published an essay against sculpture in the magazine La Martini in 1945: "scultura, lingua morta" (sculpture, a dead language). He writes, for example: "La scultura, un'arte, è da n*gris e senza pace" (sculpture is a black and uneasy art).

Despite this attack on his own métier, he created one significant work after the war, a marble sculpture in tribute to the guerrilla leader Primo Visentin, known as "Masaccio", who had been killed at the end of the war in Loria (Padua) in unexplained circumstances.

Martini worked with many materials (clay, wood, plaster, stone, especially marble, bronze, silver) but never moved far from figuration, although he was able to model abstract forms, as his atmosfera di una testa (vibrations of a head) of 1944 testifies. He exercised great influence on later Italian sculptors such as Marino Marini, Emilio Greco, Marcello Mascherini, Pericle Fazzini, and his student Fiore de Henriquez.

== Gallery ==
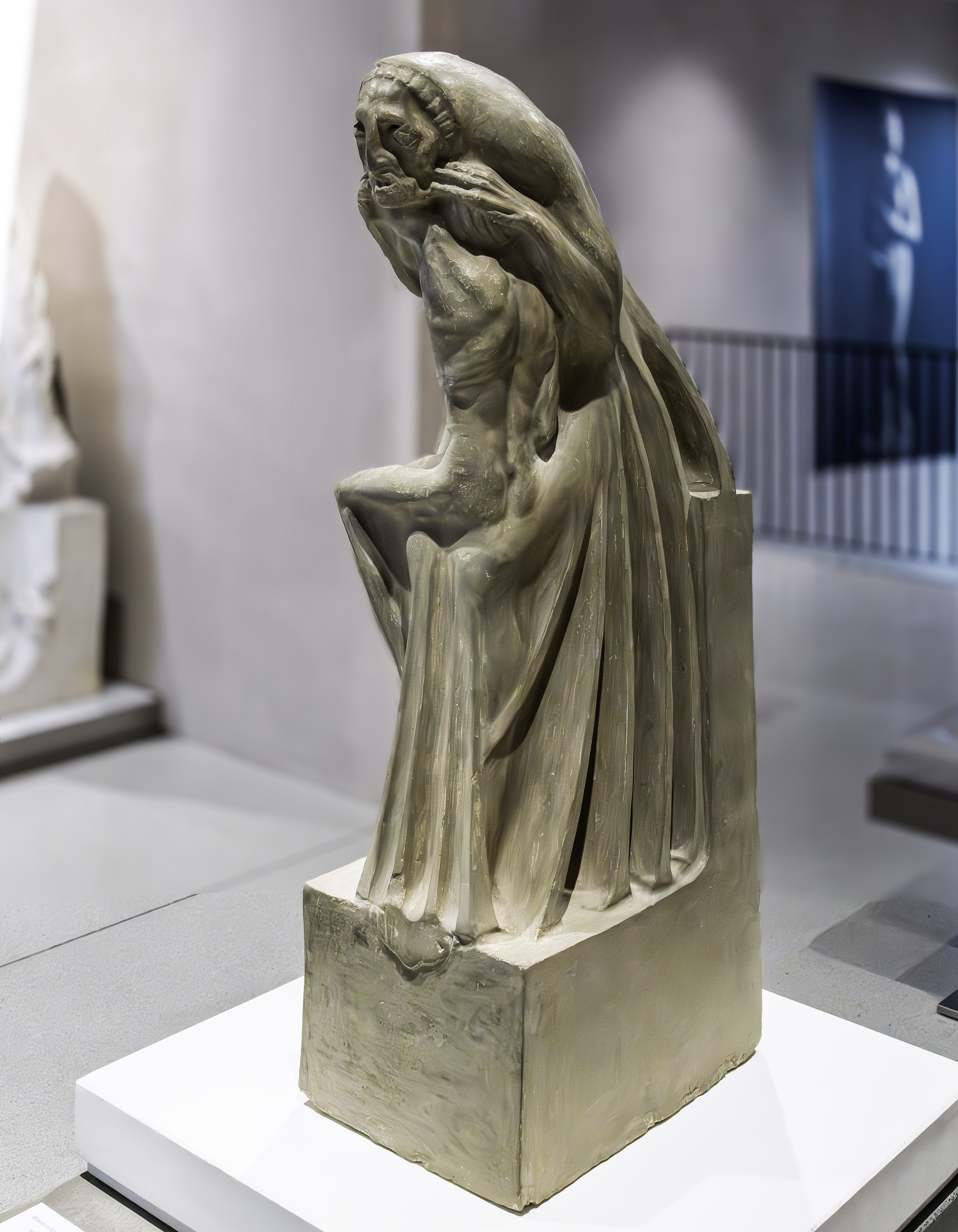
Motherhood (Maternal Love), 1910, Museo Luigi Bailo Treviso

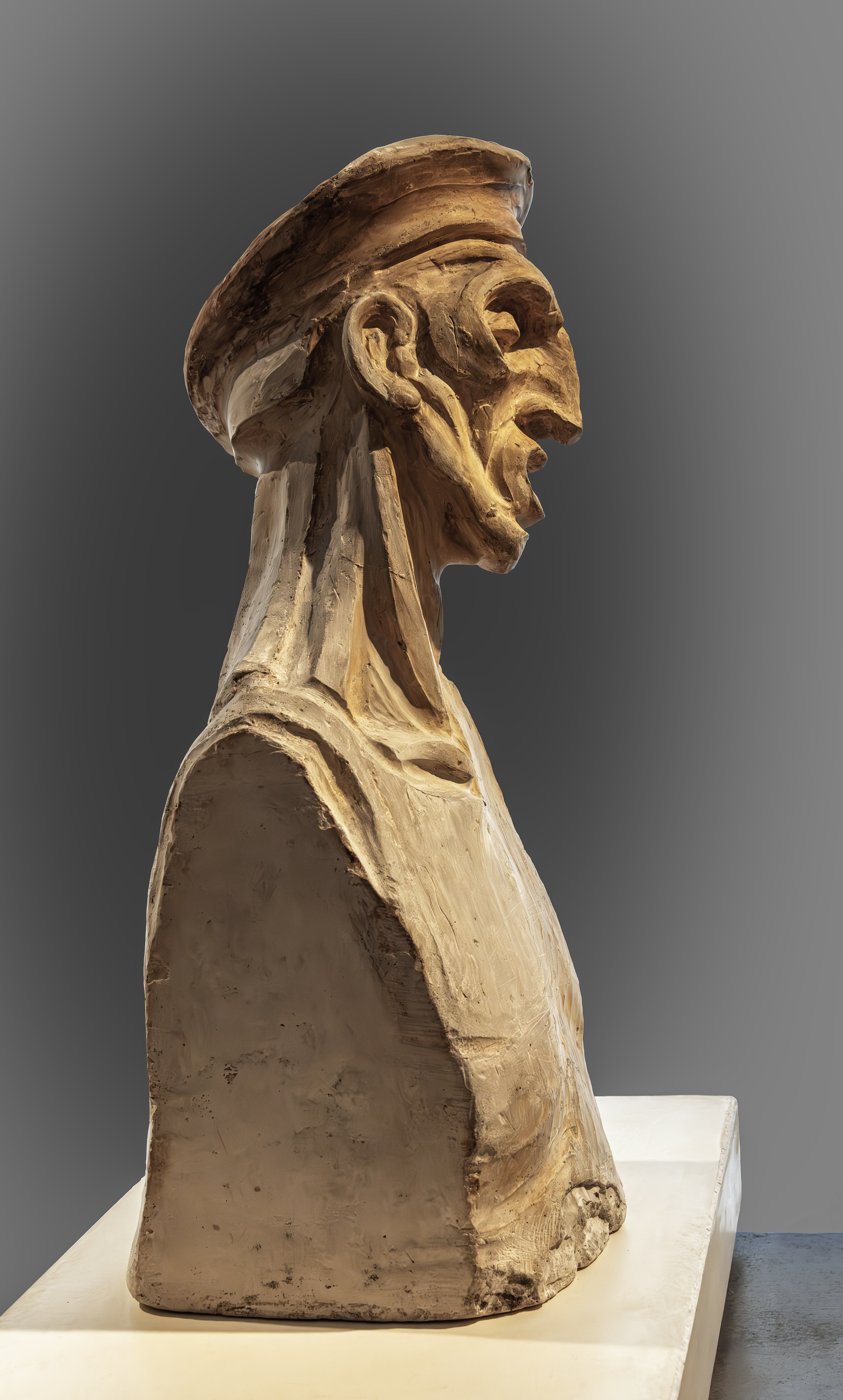
L'ubriaco 1910, Museo Luigi Bailo Treviso

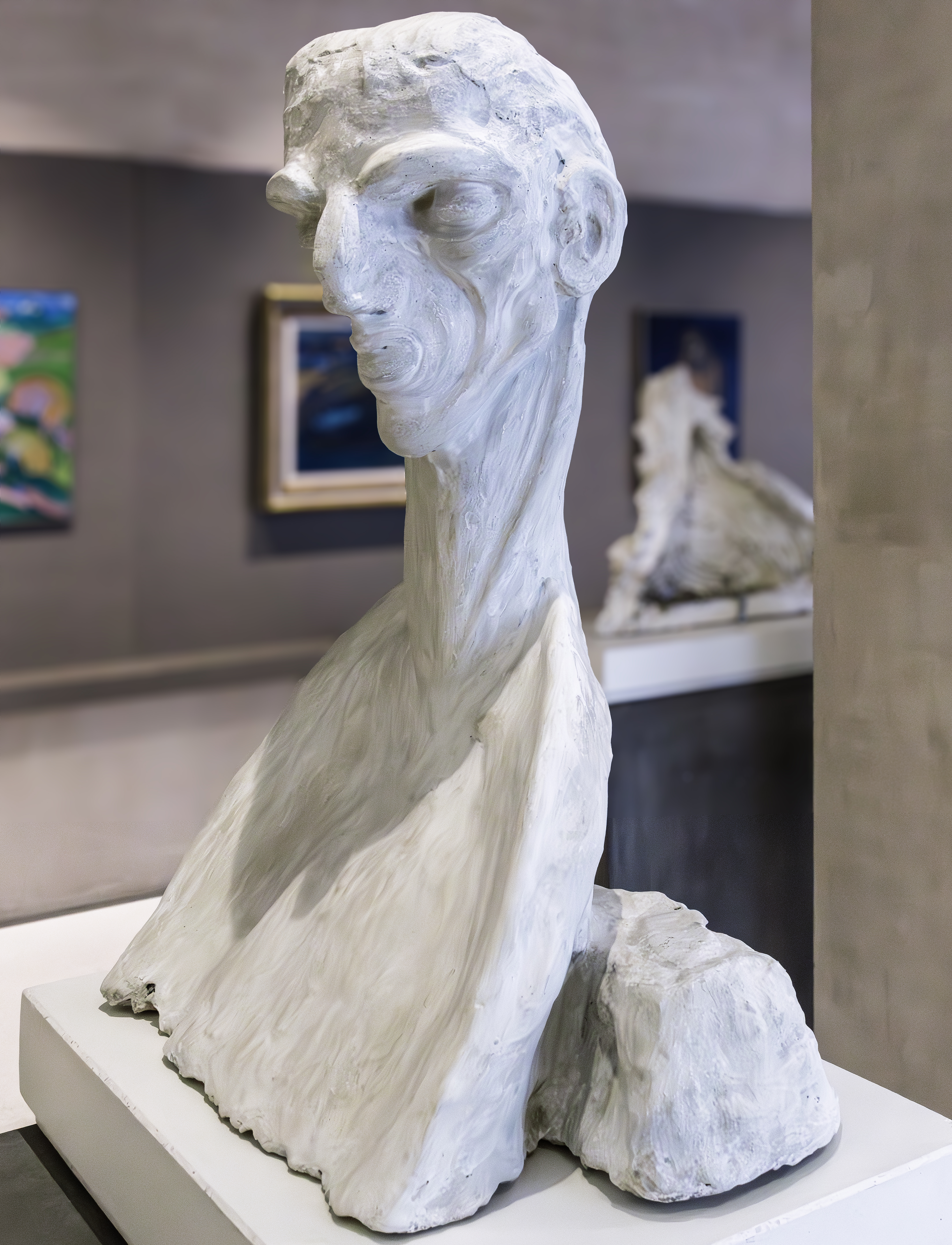
Ritratto d'uomo 1910-1911, Museo Luigi Bailo Treviso

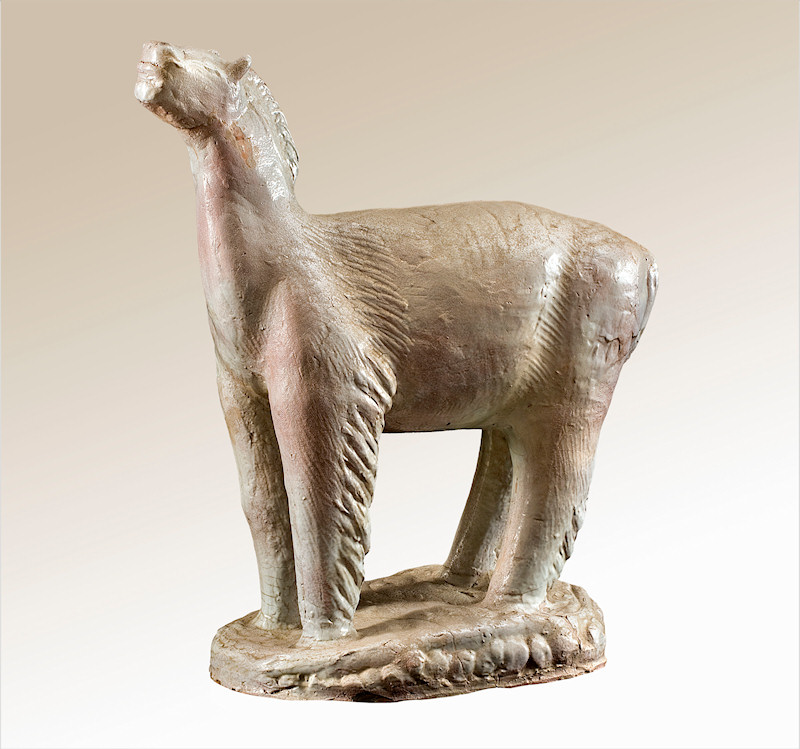
Horse, 1926 ca. (Fondazione Cariplo)

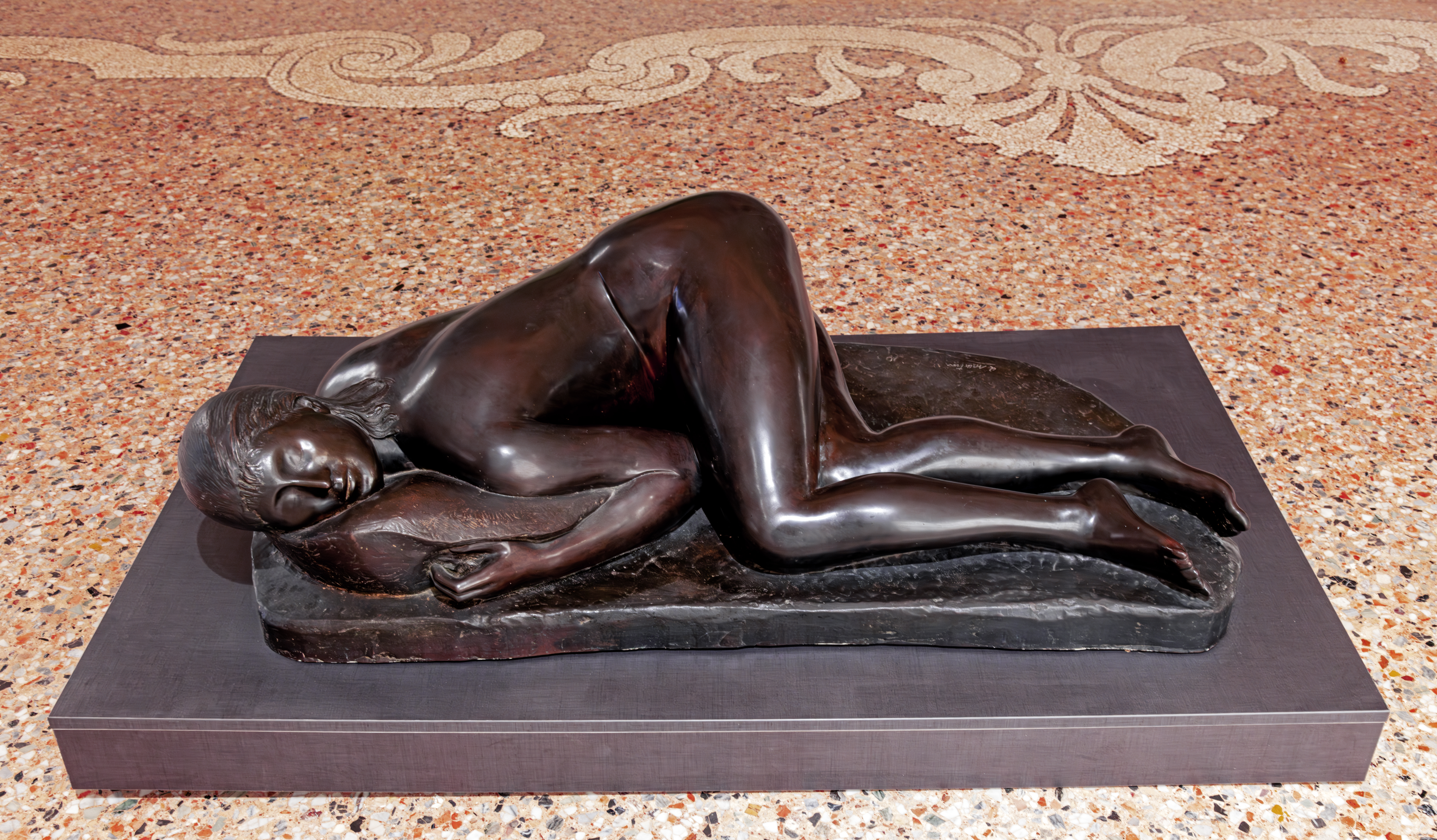
"La Pisana" 1928, Ca' Pesaro Venice

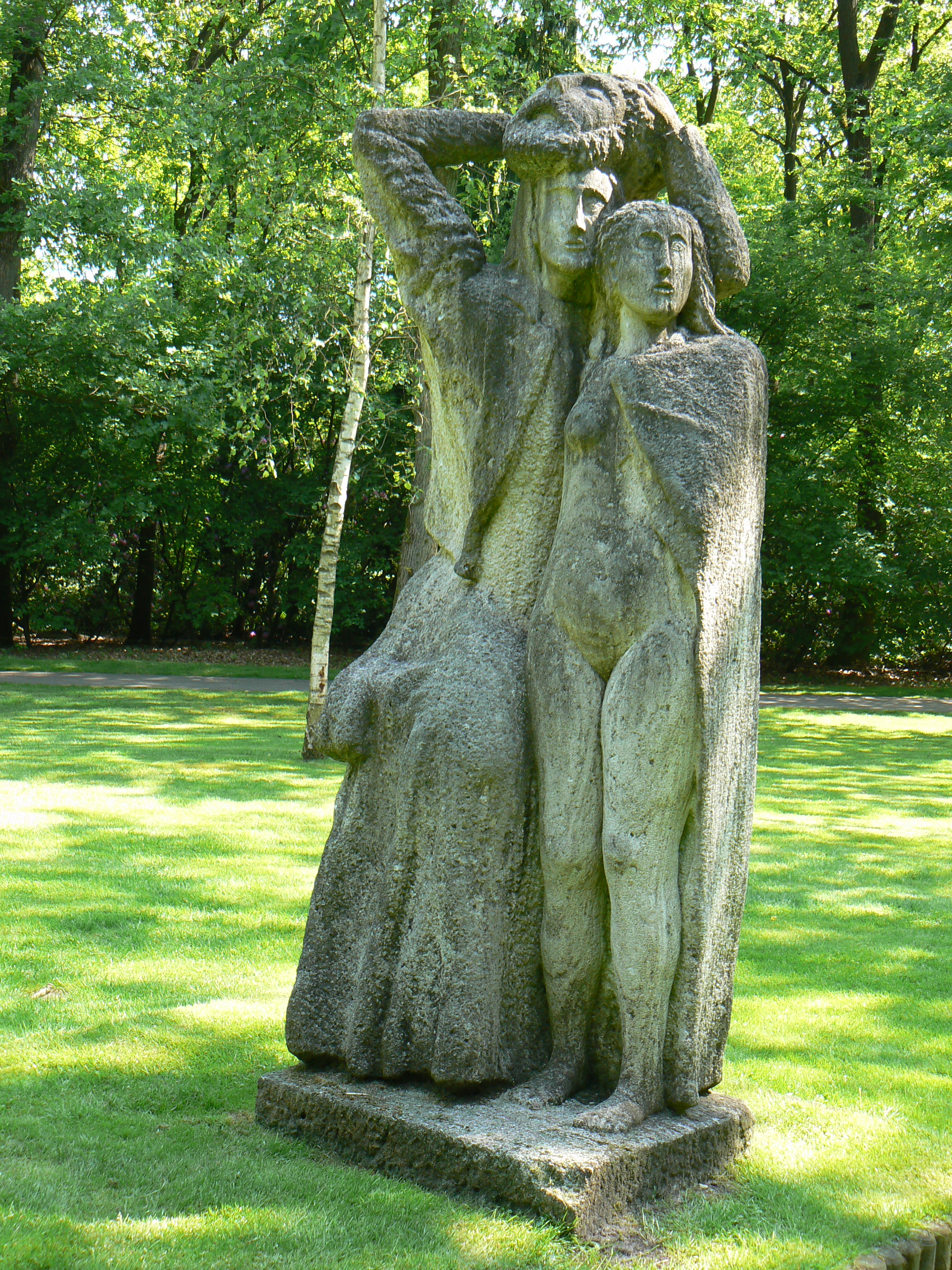
Judith and Holferenes, 1932, Kröller-Müller Museum

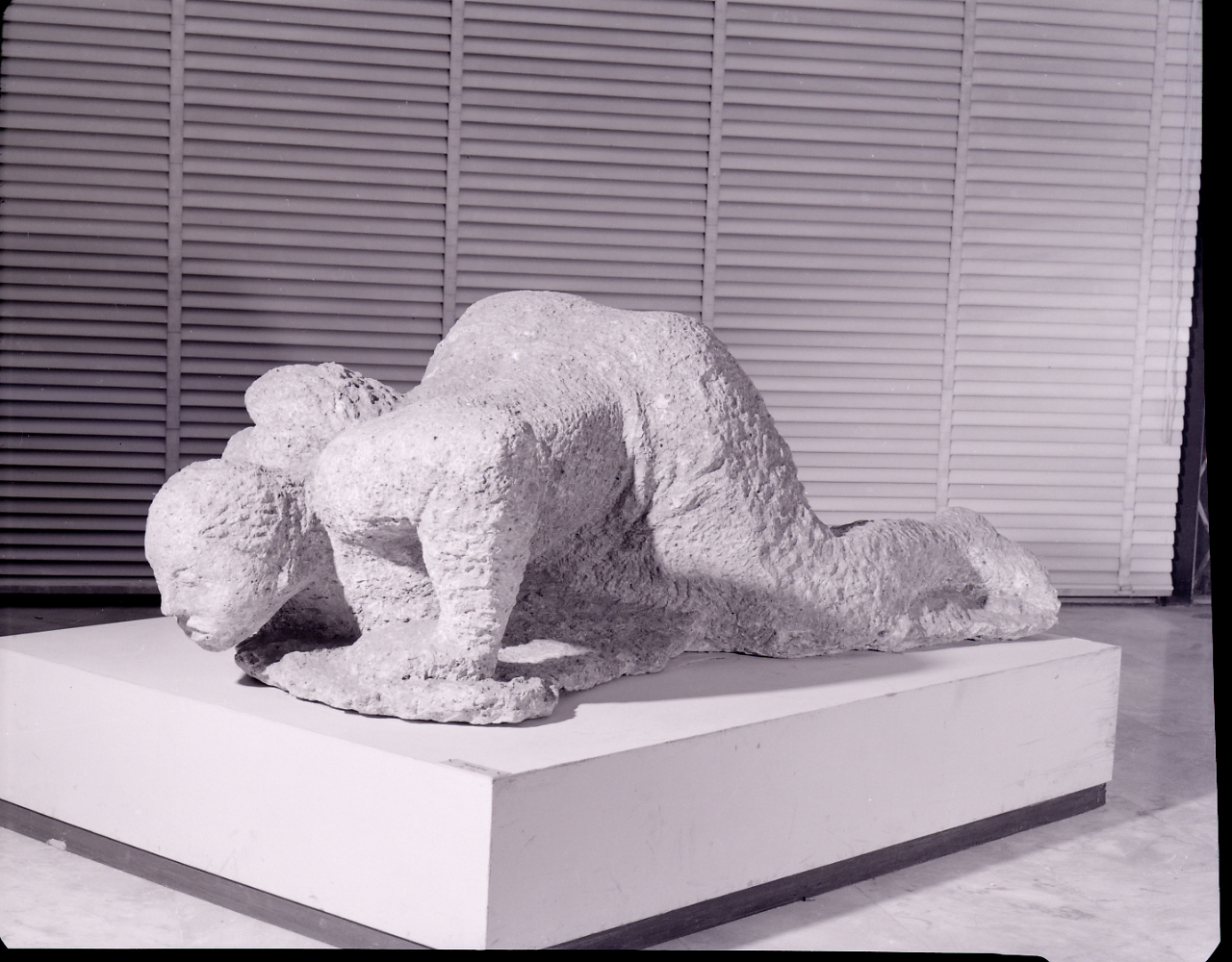
The thirst (La sete) by Arturo Martini, 1934. Photo by Paolo Monti (Fondo Paolo Monti, BEIC)

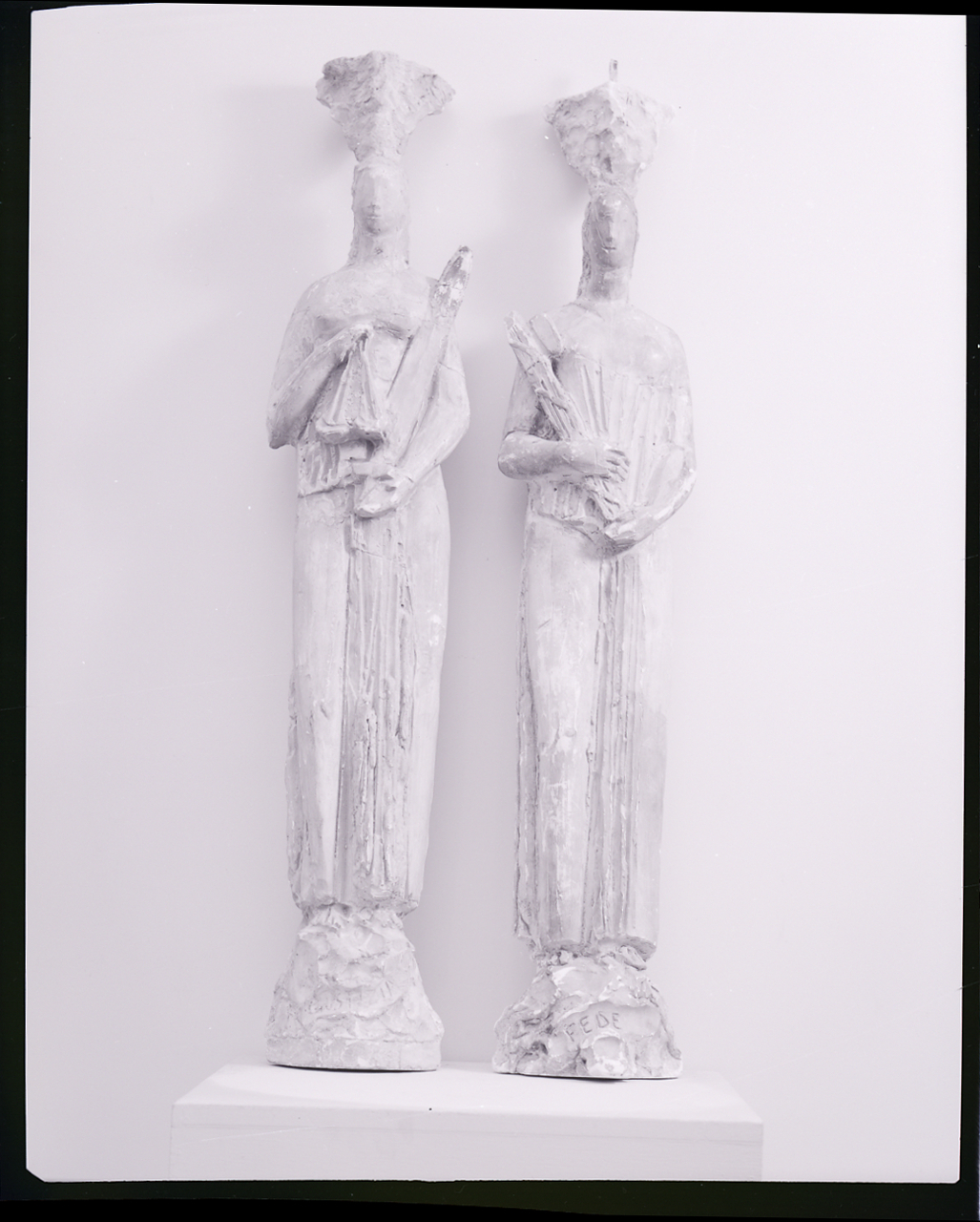
Earthenware. Photo by Paolo Monti. Il Milione gallery, Milan, 1963.

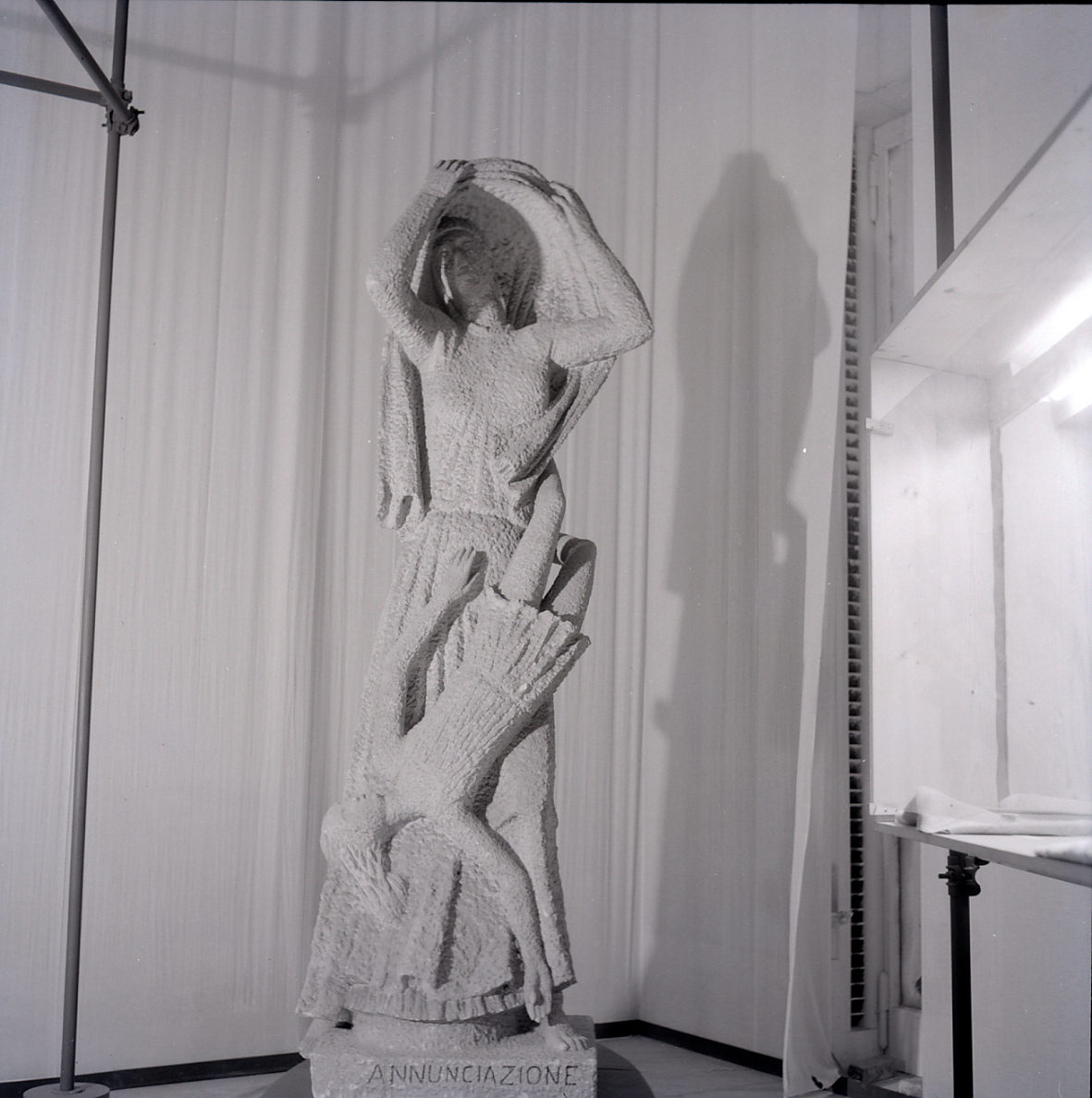
Annunciation (Annunciazione). Photo by Paolo Monti. Milan, 1963.

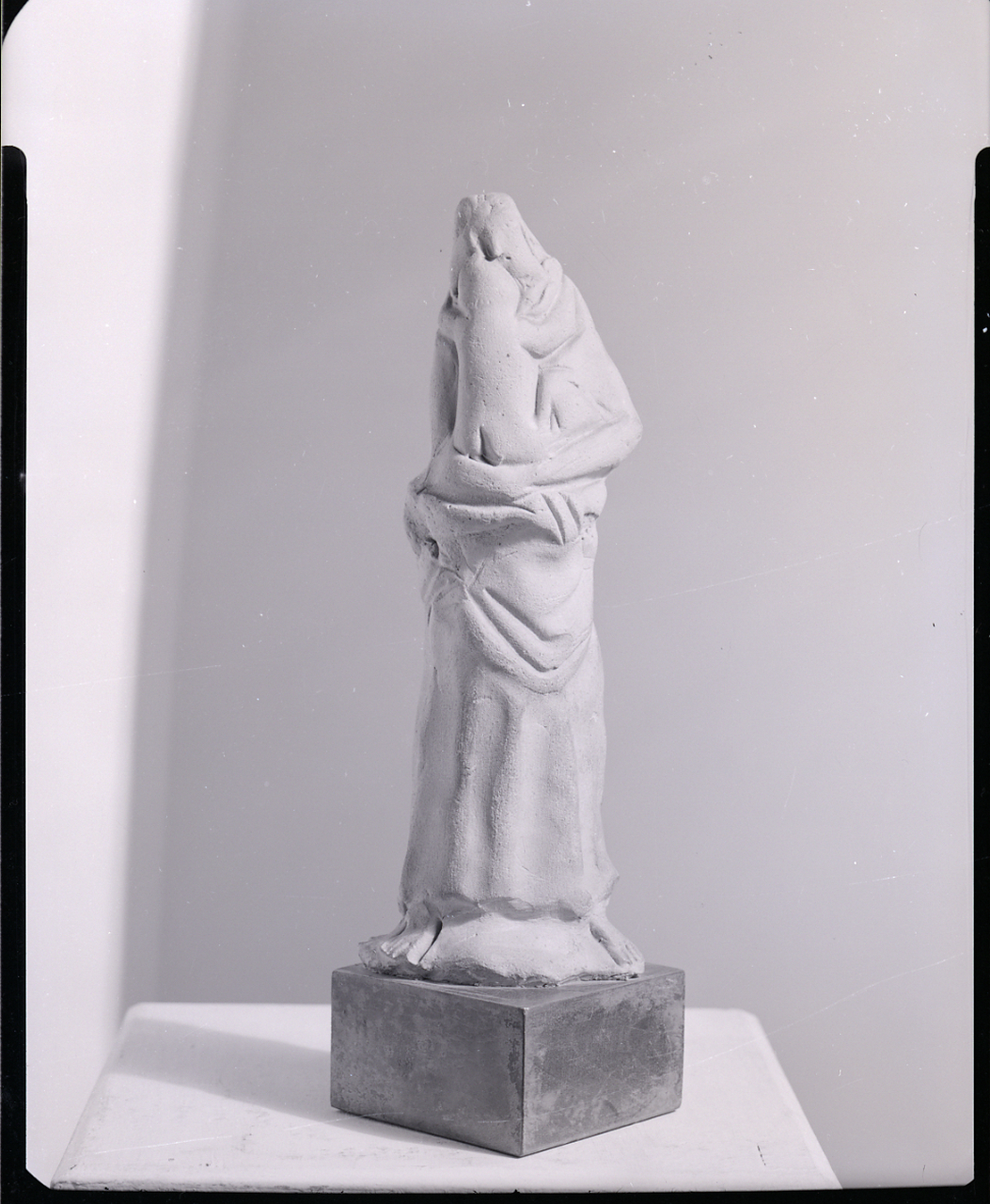
Photo by Paolo Monti. Milan, 1963.
Bronzes from the Pinacoteca Querini Stampalia

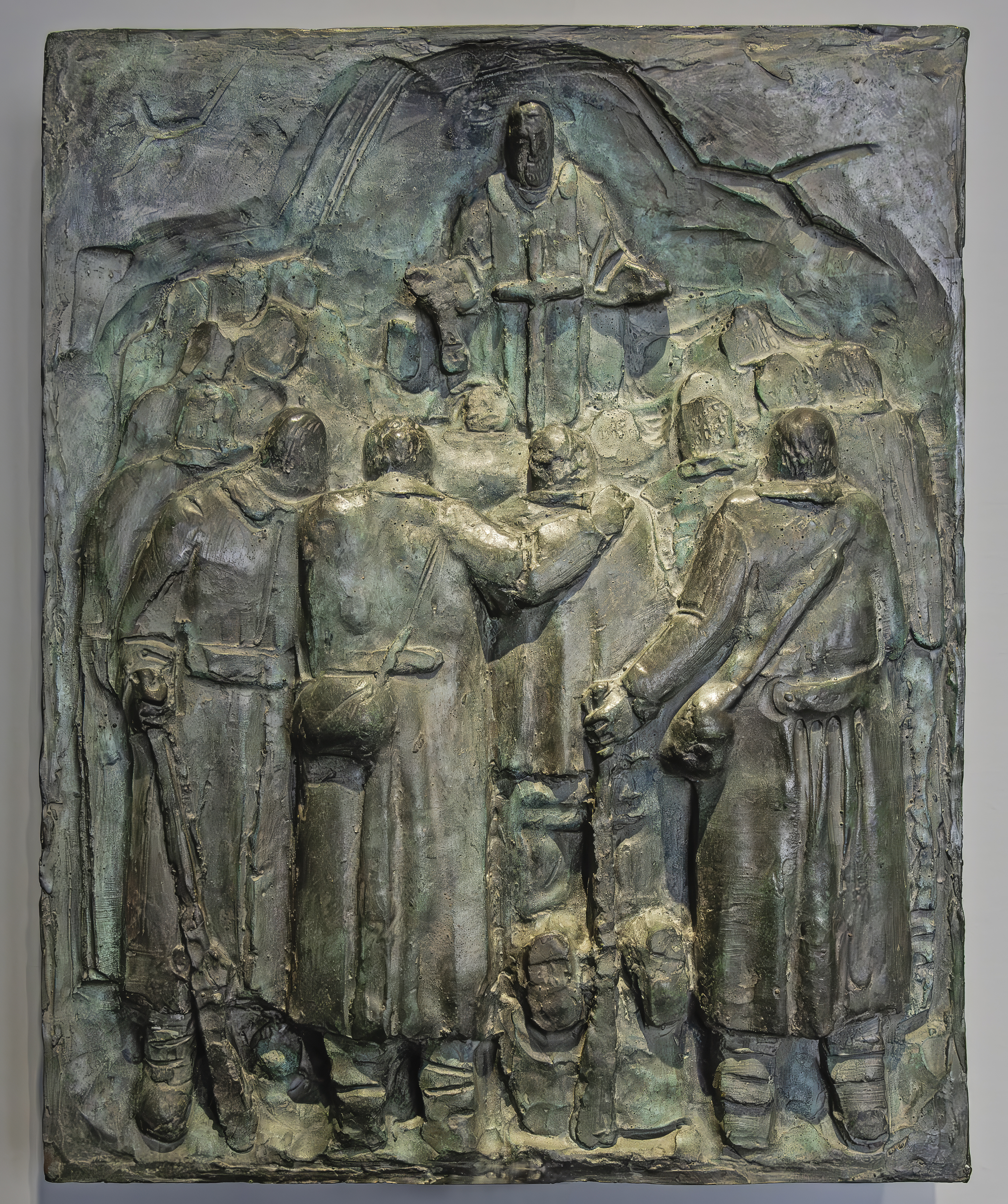
Mass at the camp

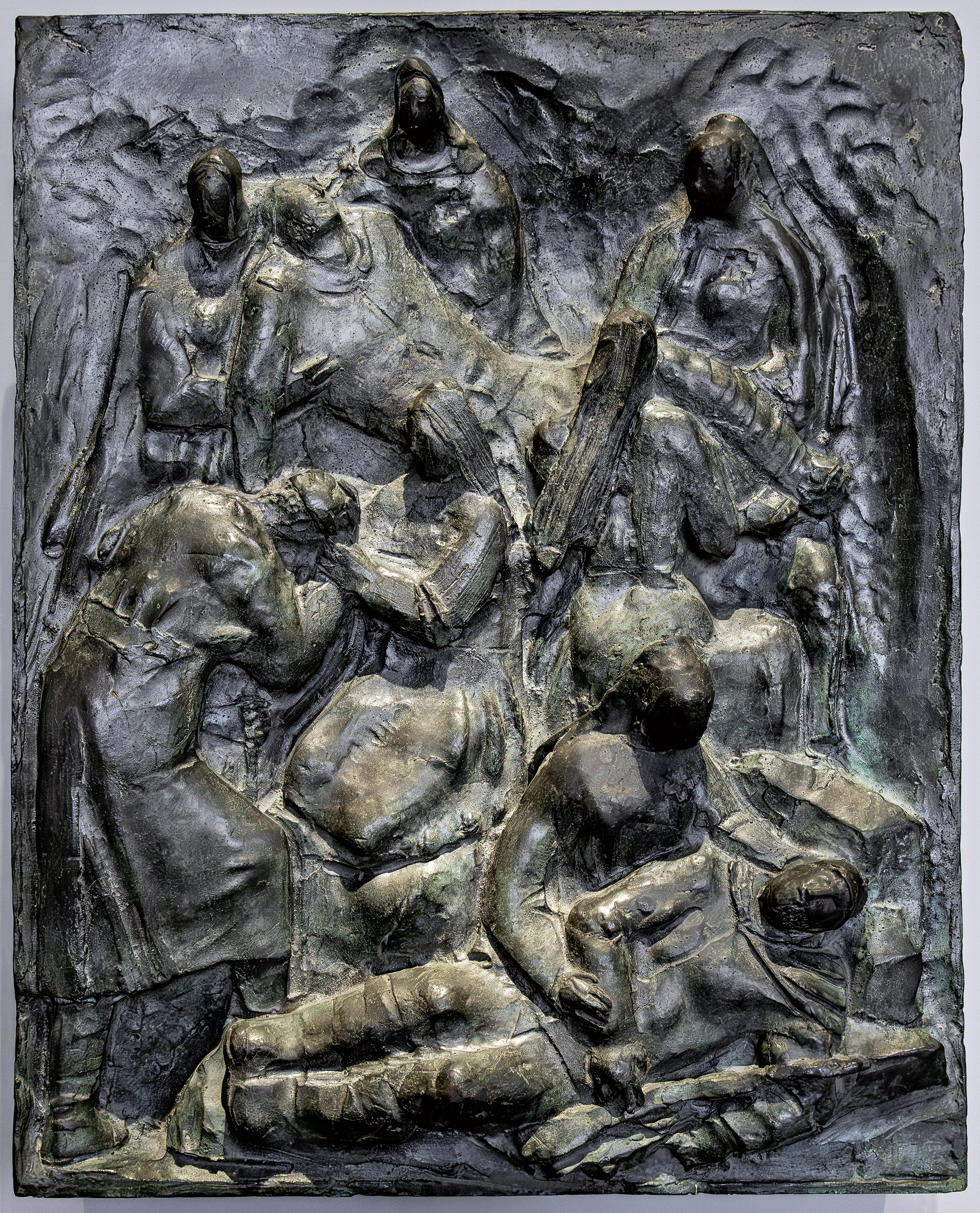
Red Cross nurses

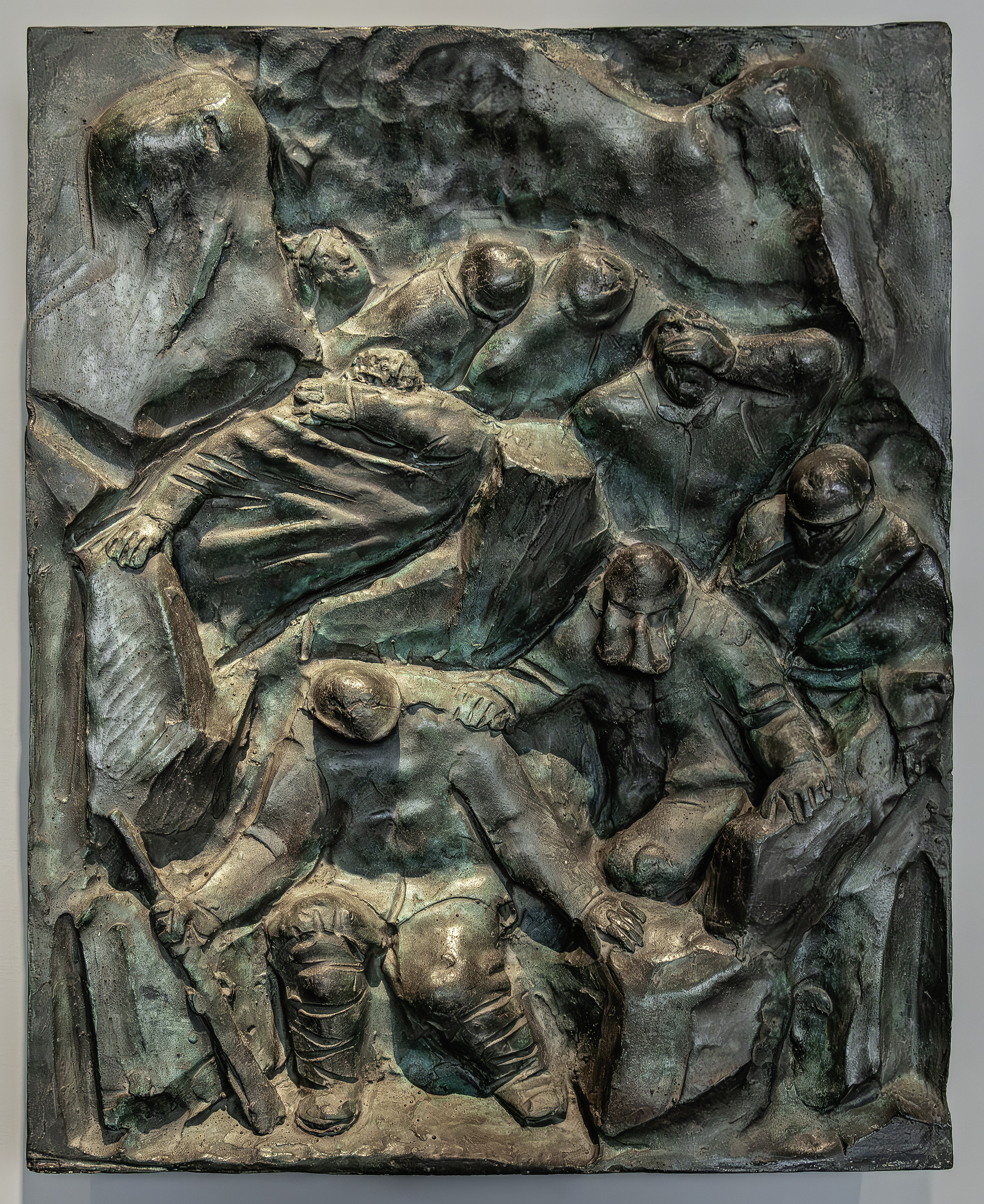
Asphyxiating Gases

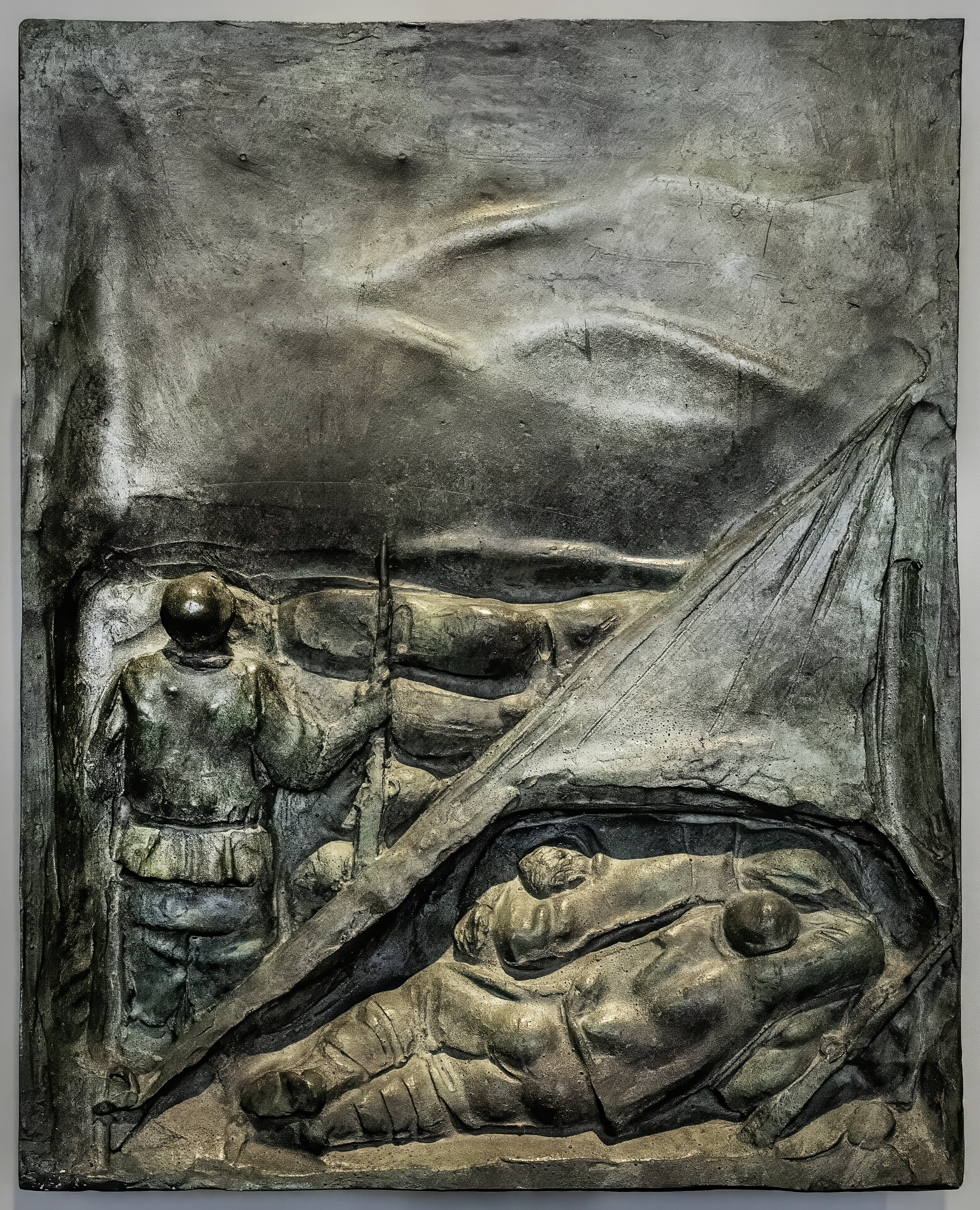
Repos dans les tranchées

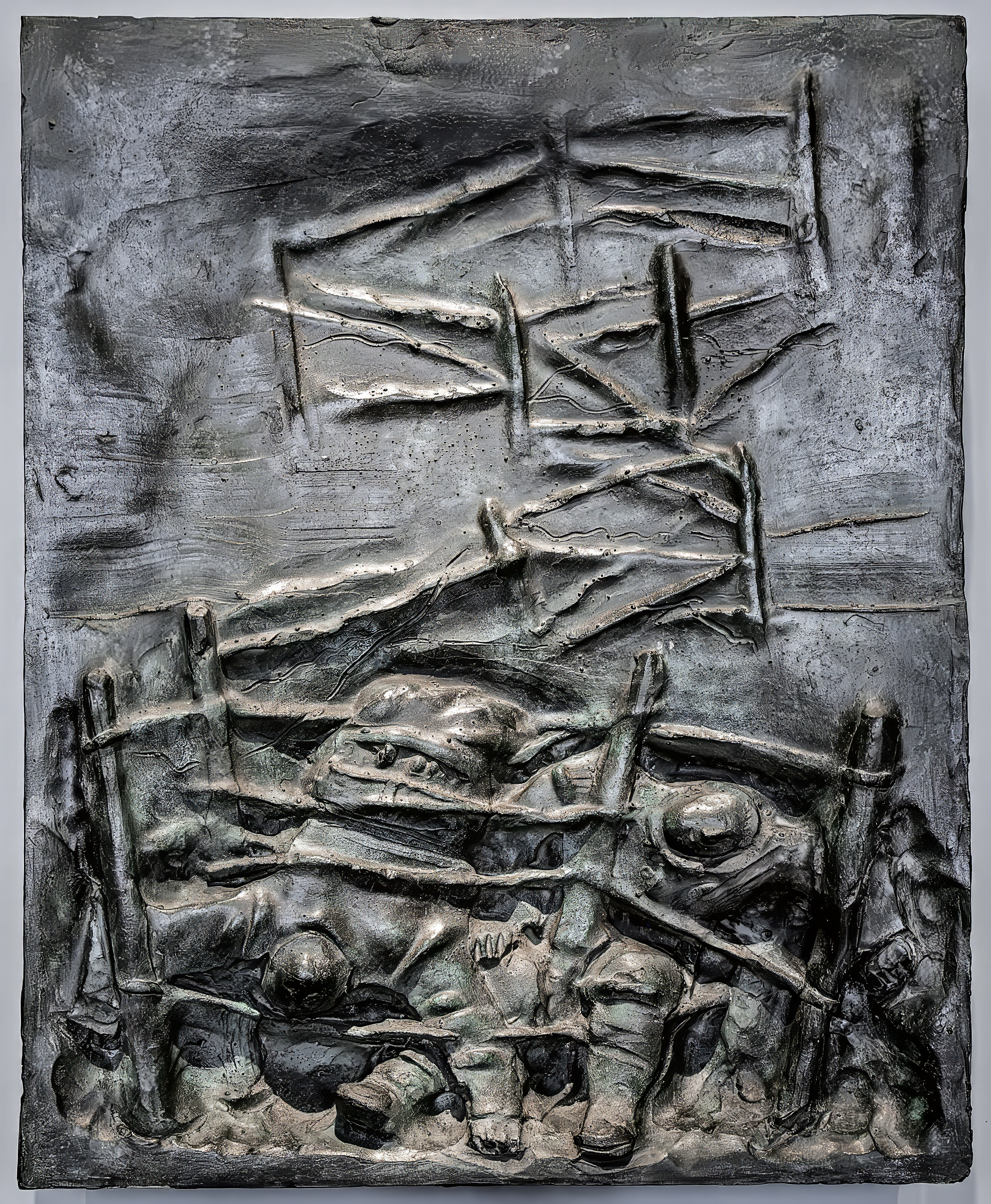
The barbed wire

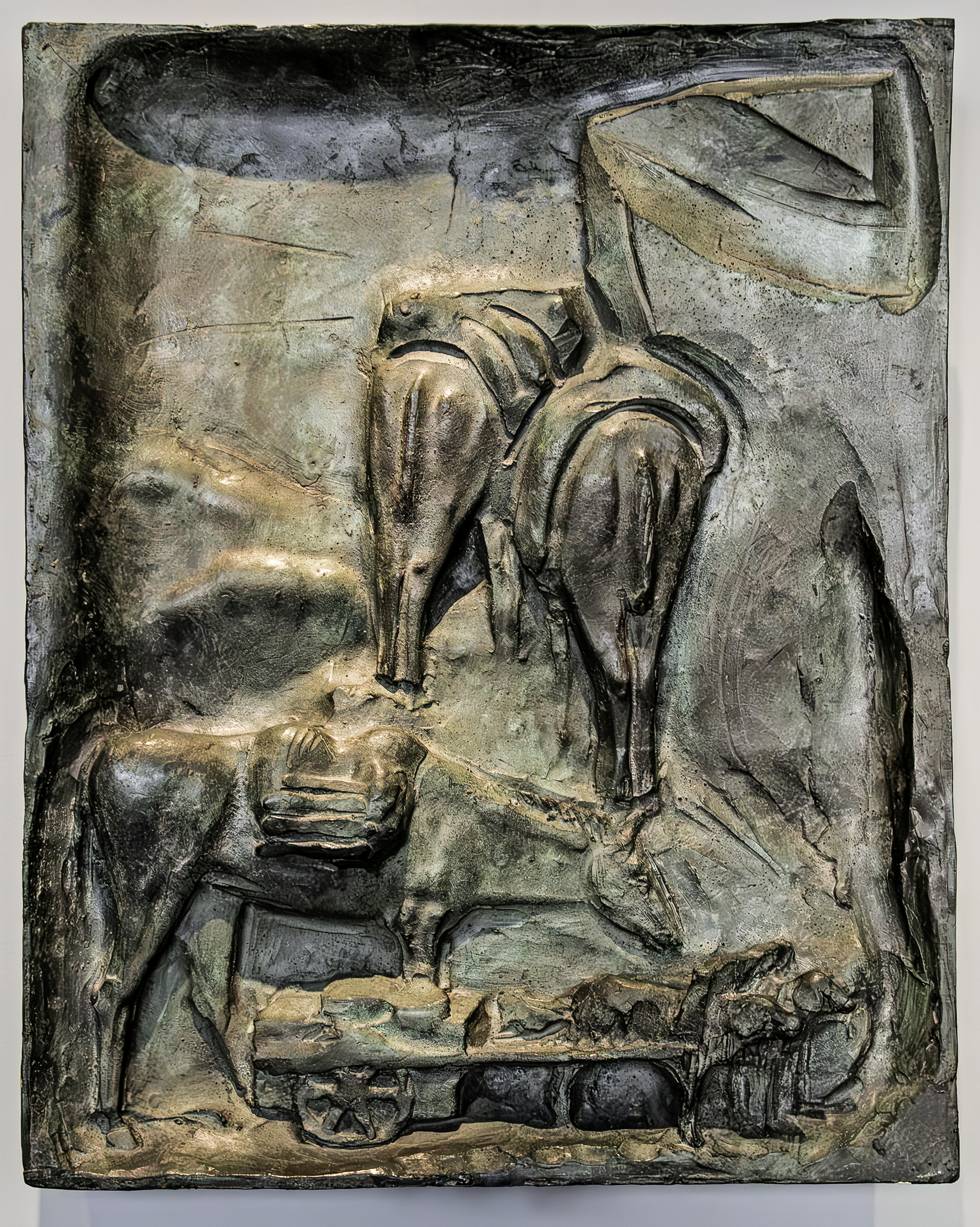
The supplies

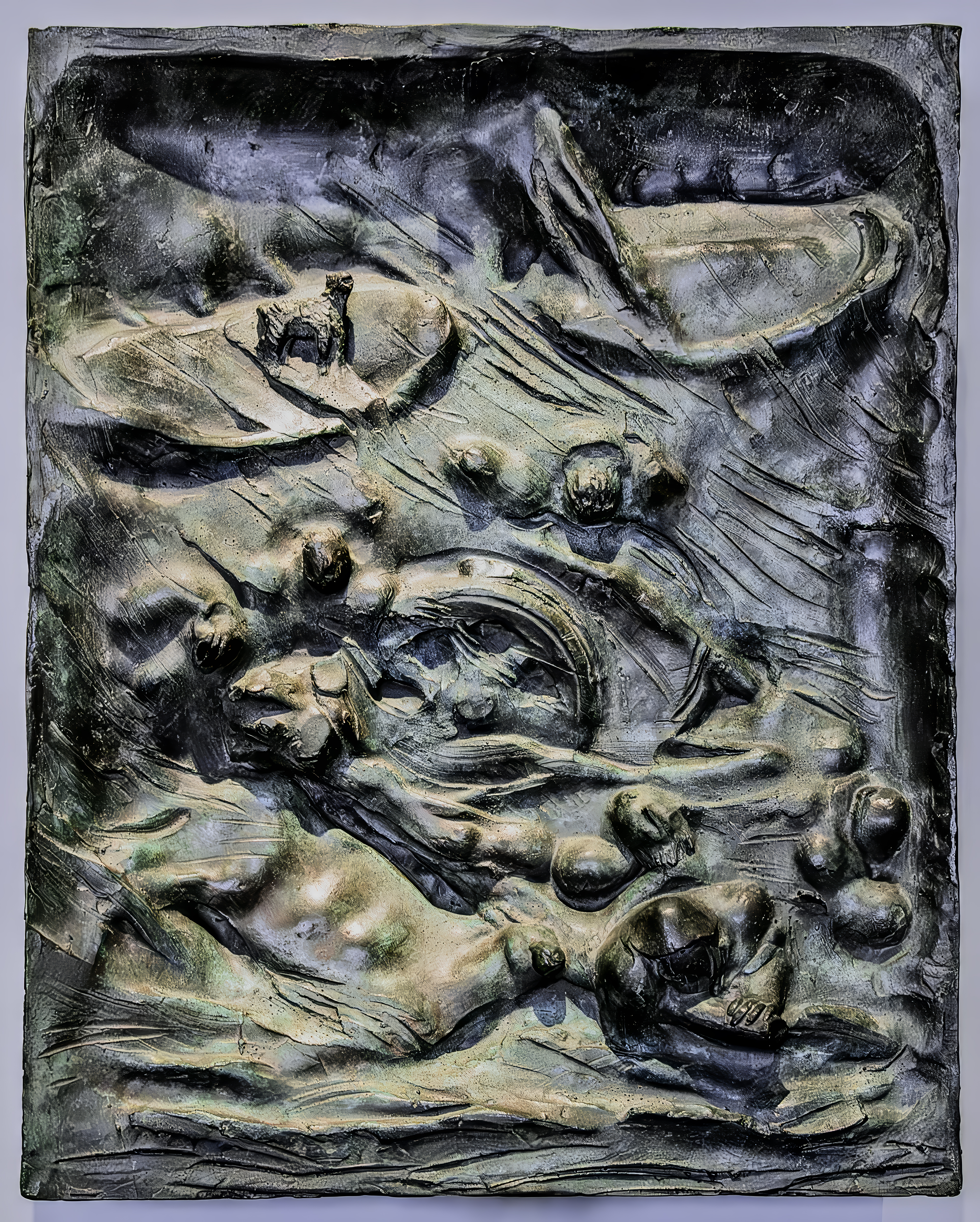
La Piave

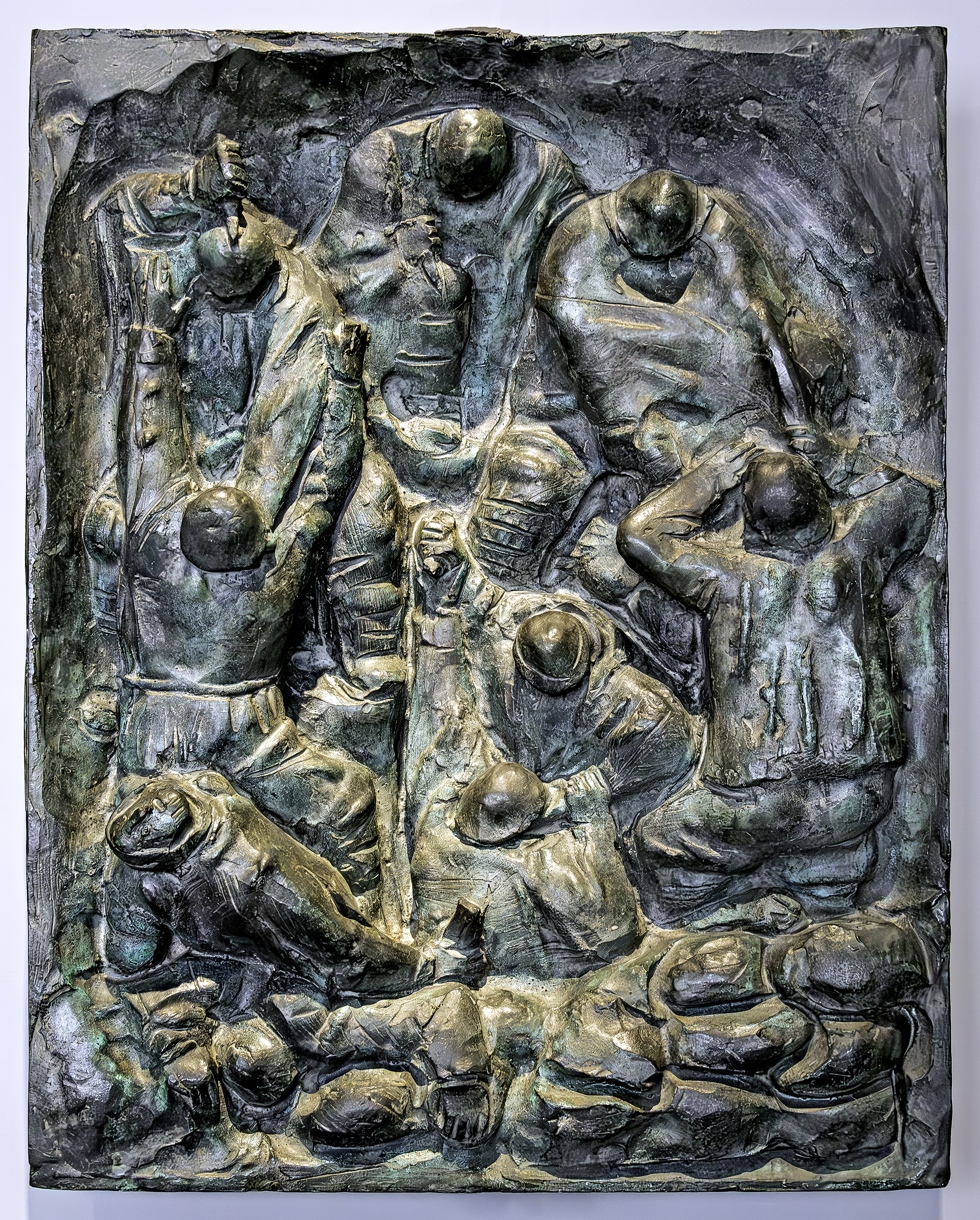
The assault

== Bibliography ==
- Arturo Martini (2001). La scrittura lingua morta e altri scritti. Milano: Abscondita.
- Gino Scarpatitolo (1968). Colloqui con Arturo Martini. Milano: Rizzoli.
- Mario De Micheli; Claudia Gian Ferrari; Giovanni Comisso (1992). Le lettere di Arturo Martini (in Italian). Charta.
- Guido Perocco, ed. (1962). Arturo Martini. Roma: Editalia.
- Pontiggia Elena (2017). Arturo Martini: la vita in figure. Monza: Johan & Levi.
- Pontiggia Elena, I volti e il cuore. La figura femminile da Ranzoni a Sironi e Martini, catalogo della mostra, Verbania, Museo del Paesaggio 2017 ISBN 978-88-941034-3-4
- Gianni Vianello, Claudia Gian Ferrari, Nico Stringa, Arturo Martini. Catalogo ragionato delle sculture, Neri Pozza, Vicenza, 1998
- Nico Stringa, Arturo Martini, Gruppo editoriale L'Espresso, Roma, 2005
- Gian Ferrari Claudia, Elena Pontiggia, Velani Livia (a cura di), Arturo Martini, Milano, Skira Editore, 2006, ISBN 8876249397
- Antonella Crippa, Arturo Martini, catalogo online Artgate della Fondazione Cariplo, 2010, CC-BY-SA.
- Maria Gioia Tavoni, Riproporre il silenzio per le Contemplazioni di Arturo Martini, Faenza, Fratelli Lega Editori, 2017
