= Spain–Turkey relations =

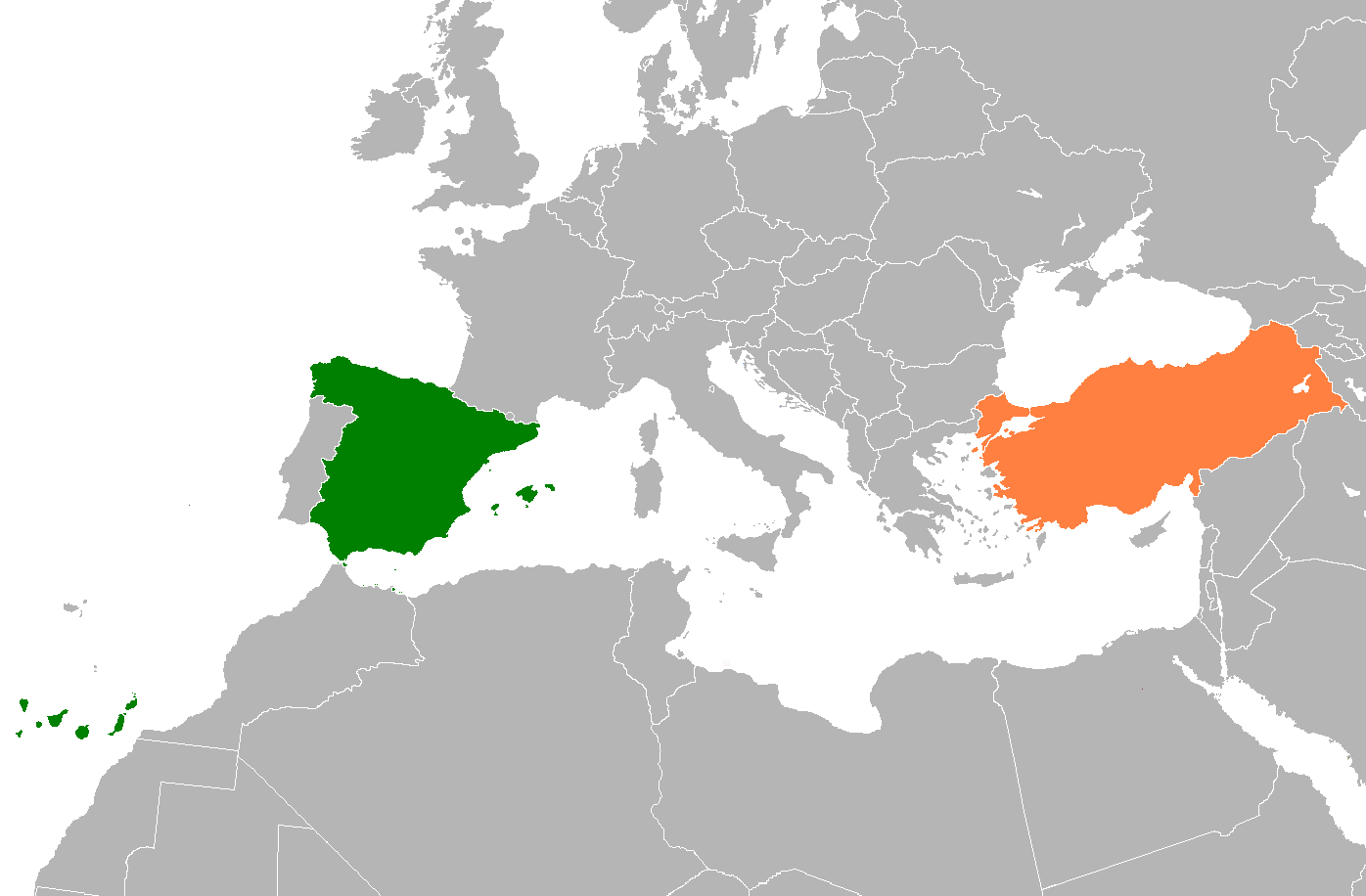
- Spain: Turkey

Diplomatic mission
- Embassy of Spain, Ankara: Embassy of Turkey, Madrid

Envoy
- Ambassador Nüket Küçükel Ezberci: Ambassador Cristina Latorre Sancho

The Kingdom of Spain and the Republic of Türkiye maintain diplomatic relations. Spain has an embassy in Ankara and a consulate general in Istanbul. Turkey has an embassy in Madrid and a consulate general in Barcelona.

Turkey and Spain are both members of the Council of Europe, the North Atlantic Treaty Organization, the Organisation for Economic Co-operation and Development, the Organization for Security and Co-operation in Europe, the World Trade Organization, and the Union for the Mediterranean. Spain is also an EU member and Turkey is an EU candidate. Historically known for their imperial and economic rivalry in centuries past, today the two countries enjoy cordial diplomatic relations. There is a well-established community of Turks in Spain, as well as a sizeable number of Spanish or Hispanophone expatriates in Turkey.

== History ==
=== Ottoman-Spanish relations ===
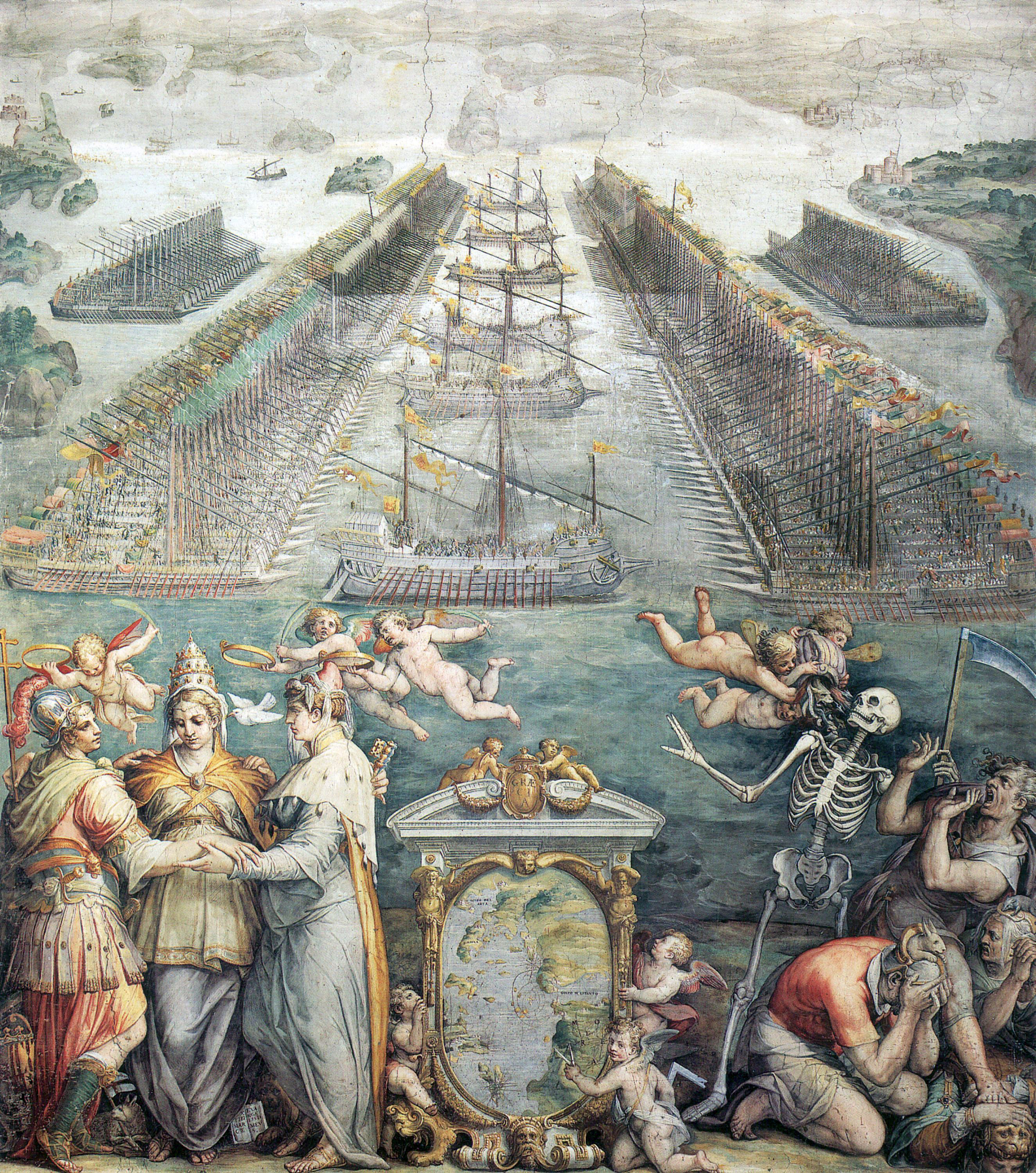
Battle of Lepanto

During the 16th century, Habsburg Spain and the Ottoman Empire fought for supremacy in the Mediterranean. A highlight was the battle of Lepanto, in which the Spanish-led fleet (allied with the Republic of Venice and the Papal States) defeated the Ottoman fleet. In North Africa, the Spanish actions against the Barbary pirates (Ottoman allies) were not successful for long. The Spanish lost Tunisia to the Ottomans in 1574.

During this time, the Ottomans welcomed many Sephardi Jews and conversos fleeing from religious persecution in Spain, who introduced the Gutenberg press and theater and supported a failed Morisco revolt. The silver brought from Spanish America caused massive inflation in Spain that extended to the rest of Europe and even the Ottoman Empire, being the cause, among others, for the decline of the Turkish Empire in the East.

Commercial relations between both empires increased during the second half of the 18th century. After the start of negotiations in 1779 between the Spanish monarchy and the Sublime Porte, a Treaty of Peace, Friendship and Commerce was signed in 1782, the so-called Treaty of Constantinople. While the normalization of relations logically took place after the treaty, a period of certain mutual "indifference" also ensued.

=== Relations between Spain and the Republic of Turkey ===
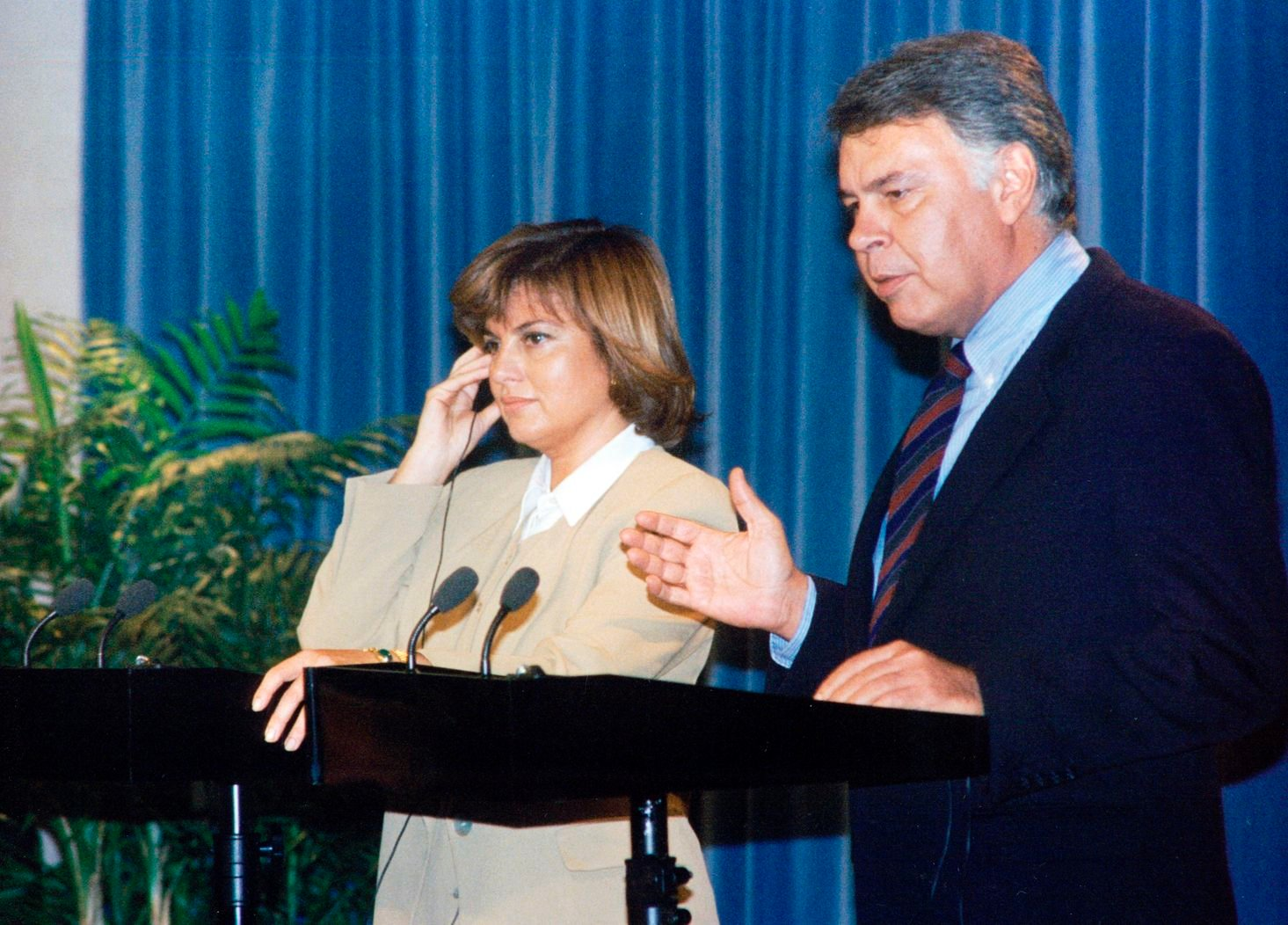
Joint press conference between Felipe González and Tansu Çiller in 1995 in Madrid

A rapprochement between the Republic of Turkey, led by prime minister Adnan Menderes, and Francoist Spain began by the mid-20th century, and both countries signed a Treaty of Friendship in 1959. This strengthening of relations continued in the 1980s, in a favourable context facilitated by circumstances such as the joining of Spain to the North Atlantic Treaty Organization (NATO) in 1982, a military alliance to which Turkey already belonged.

Spain lobbied in favour of the entry into force of the European Union–Turkey Customs Union in 1995. The joint action plan signed between Turkey and Spain, on 22 July 1998, established the framework of the bilateral relations between the two countries. Presented to the General Assembly of the United Nations in September 2004, the so-called Alliance of Civilizations was initiated by Spanish prime minister José Luis Rodríguez Zapatero, co-sponsored by the Turkish prime minister Recep Tayyip Erdoğan.

The first formal inter-governmental summit (Reunión de Alto Nivel; RAN; transl. High-Level Meeting) took place in April 2009 in Istanbul.

Considered one of the main countries that supported the Turkish bid to EU membership, Spain tried to push forward with some advances vis-à-vis the latter during the Spanish Presidency of the Council of the European Union in 2010, meeting the outright opposition from EU leaders such as Sarkozy or Merkel. In early 2015, Spain stationed a battery of Patriot missiles near Adana, further extending the length of the deployment afterwards. Spain imposed an arms embargo on Turkey in 2019 due to Turkey's military operation in Syria.

==== 2026 missile interception and public reaction ====
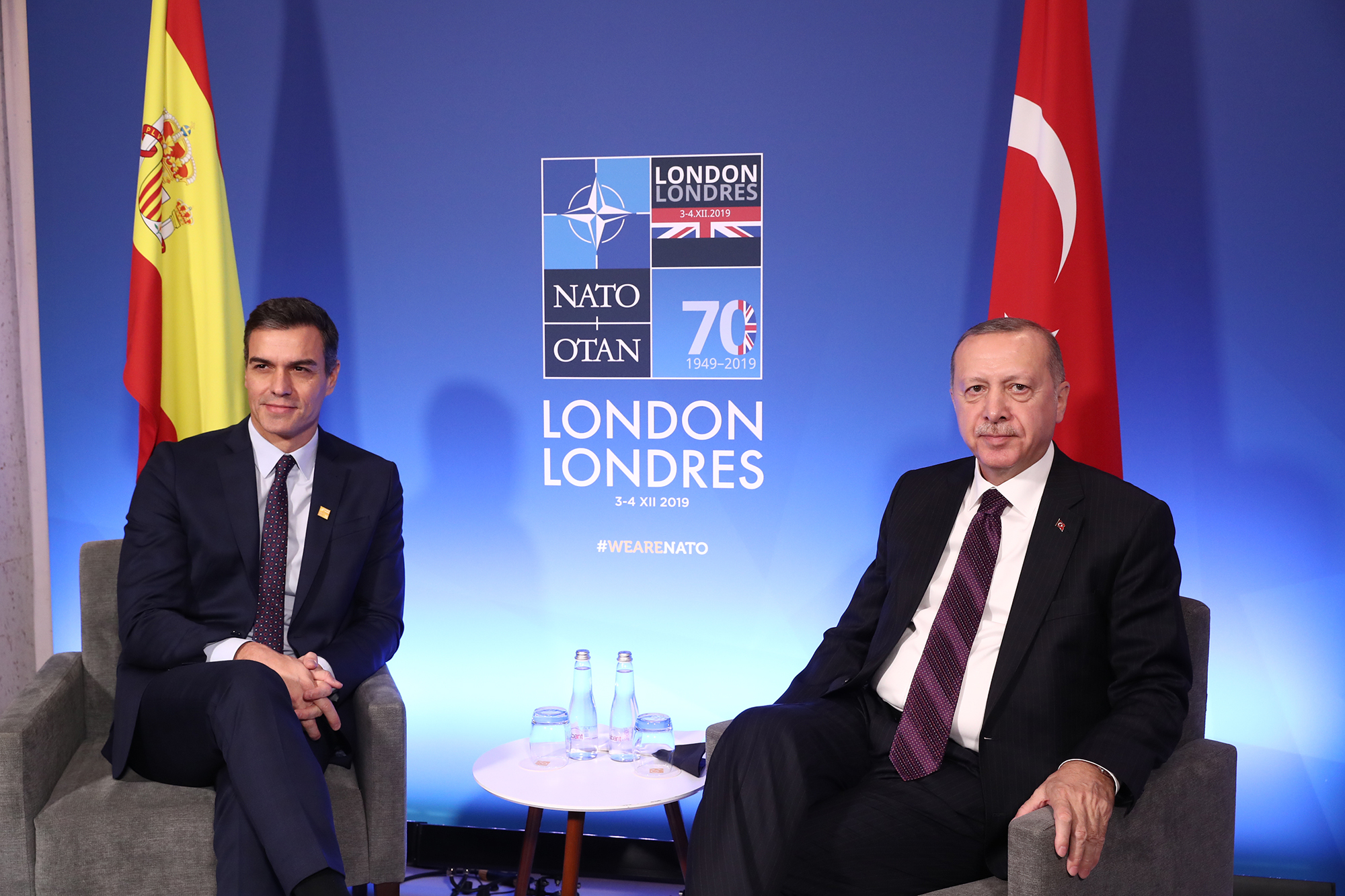
Spanish prime minister Pedro Sánchez meeting with Turkish president Recep Tayyip Erdoğan at a NATO summit in London, 4 December 2019

In March 2026, Spain–Türkiye relations received renewed attention during the regional escalation involving Iran. On 4 March 2026, NATO air-defence systems intercepted a ballistic missile launched from Iran that was heading toward Turkish airspace. Spanish military personnel stationed with NATO at Incirlik Air Base in Türkiye reportedly provided radar tracking information from a Patriot air-defence battery that contributed to the interception carried out by allied forces.

The incident also generated widespread interaction between Turkish and Spanish audiences on social media and in television coverage. Following statements by Spanish Prime Minister Pedro Sánchez opposing military escalation and rejecting the use of Spanish bases for attacks not covered by international law, Turkish social media users expressed support for Spain, with Turkish media describing a wave of online Spain–Türkiye solidarity. Commentators noted that the cross-language exchanges between broadcasters and online communities in both countries highlighted public interest in the bilateral relationship during the crisis.

== Economic relations ==
Trade volume between Turkey and Spain was €5.99 billion in 2011. There was a development in the economic field in 2015 with trade at US$8.5 billion.

There are more than 610 Spanish firms operating in Turkey. The value of Spanish investments in Turkey is around $10 billion. In 2008, more than 350,000 Spanish tourists visited Turkey.

Around 75 Turkish firms operate in Spain. The Turkish investments in Spain reached $143 million in the period of 2002–2015.

== Resident diplomatic missions ==
- Spain has an embassy in Ankara and a consulate-general in Istanbul.
- Turkey has an embassy in Madrid and a consulate-general in Barcelona.

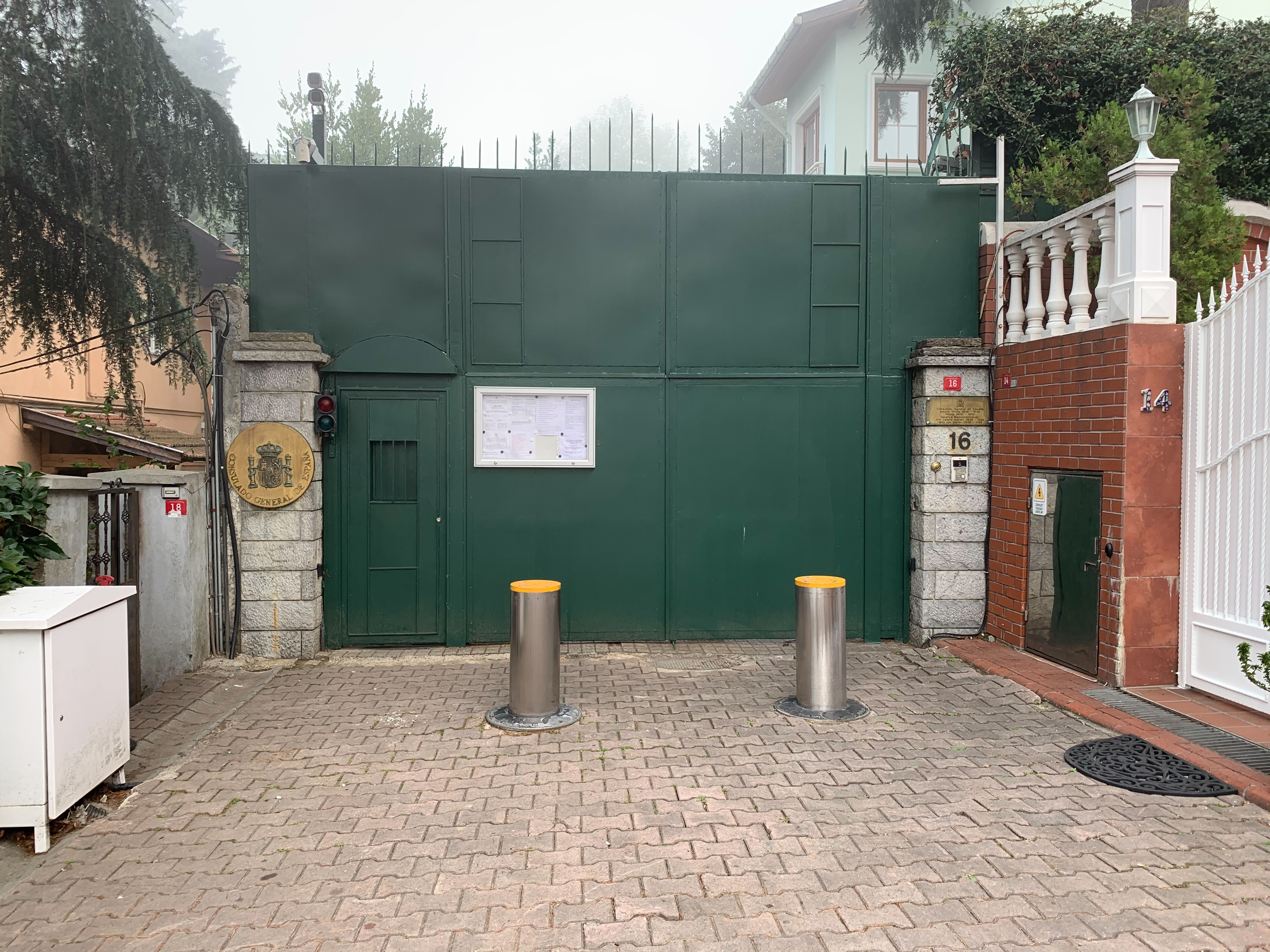
Consulate-General of Spain in Istanbul

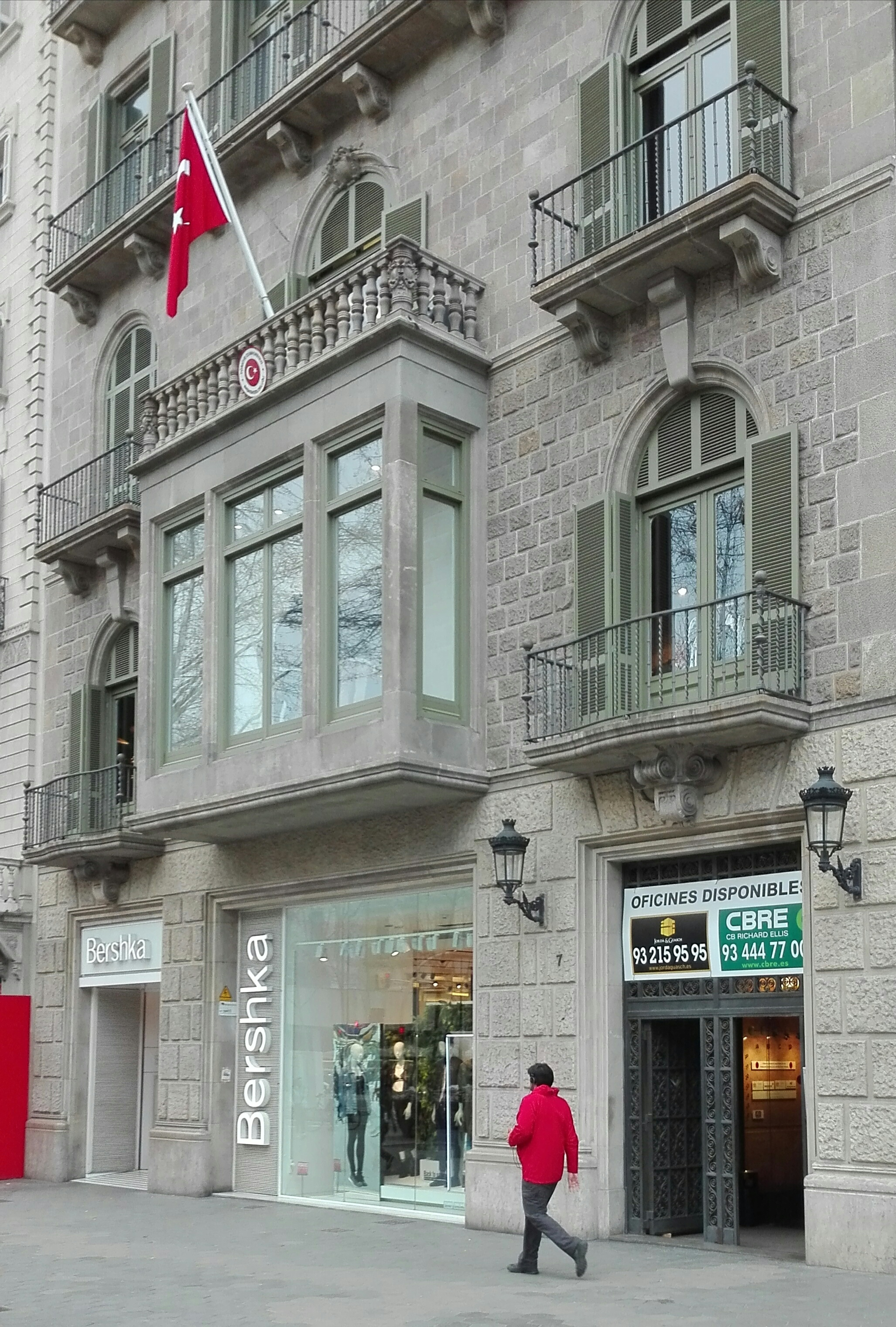
Consulate-General of Turkey in Barcelona

== See also ==
- Foreign relations of Spain
- Foreign relations of Turkey
- Turks in Spain
