= Fiore de Henriquez =

Italian sculptor

- Born: Maria Fiore de Henriquez; 20 June 1921; Trieste, Kingdom of Italy
- Died: 5 June 2004 (aged 82)
- Known for: Sculpture

Fiore de Henriquez (20 June 1921 – 5 June 2004) was an Italian-British sculptor.

== Personal life and education ==
de Henriquez was born in Trieste to a father descended from Spanish nobility of the Habsburg court in Vienna; her mother was of Turkish and Russian origin. She had one older brother, Diego, who went on to found the Diego de Henriquez War Museum for Peace. de Henriquez studied at the Accademia di Belle Arti di Venezia under Arturo Martini.

As a teenager, she was a member of the fascist youth organization Opera Nazionale Balilla, but during World War II she worked with the Italian resistance movement and helped escort Jewish refugees to safety. Her father had been denounced as an anti-fascist in 1935 for refusing to Italianize his surname.

In 1949, she left Italy for England, and became a British citizen in 1953. She lived there for much of the rest of her life, but also returned often to Italy. In 1966, she purchased the hamlet of Peralta in Tuscany, and spent much time on its restoration as an art colony.

de Henriquez was born intersex with ambiguous genitalia, and declared herself "proud to be hermaphrodite" and "two people inside one body." She had a brief relationship with German painter Kurt Kramer in the 1940s, but her primary romantic and sexual relationships were with women. de Henriquez adopted an unusual style of dress; in his diaries, Christopher Isherwood described her as appearing "dressed like a male peasant in Cavalleria rusticana."

== Career ==
She held her art exhibition debut in Florence in 1947. Following her move to Britain, she exhibited at the Royal Academy of Arts in 1950. In 1951, she produced work for the Festival of Britain. From the late 1950s until 1975, she spent a few months each year touring North America, working and lecturing. She had two further solo shows in Rome in 1975 and 1983.

de Henriquez created portrait sculptures of a wide range of individuals, including Igor Stravinsky, Margot Fonteyn, Augustus John, Peter Ustinov, John F. Kennedy, Vivien Leigh, Queen Elizabeth The Queen Mother, Oprah Winfrey, and Laurence Olivier. Towards the end of the 1970s, she began to travel in East Asia, and carried out commissions for clients in Japan and Hong Kong. She is known to have created around 4000 portraits between 1948 and her death in 2004. She also worked in other areas of sculpture, such as her fountain of dolphins which was erected in a courtyard at the World Intellectual Property Organization headquarters in Geneva.

de Henriquez's gender identity informed much of her work, with its recurring motifs of paired heads, conjoined figures, and ambiguous mythological creatures. Much of her early work was in the primitivist mode. From the early 1960s, her friendship with cubist sculptor Jacques Lipchitz encouraged her to experiment with looser forms.
