= Francesco Taskayali =

Italian pianist and composer

Francesco Taskayali (Rome, July 4, 1991) is an Italian pianist and composer.

== Biography ==
Born in Rome to an Italian mother and a Turkish father, he spent his childhood in Istanbul's Cihangir district until the age of five years. In 1996 his parents moved to Latina, a city near Rome, where Taskayali remained until 2008, then he returned to live in Istanbul to finish school. He currently lives in Milan. He began composing music in 2004 at age 13 with the song "È Sera". In 2010 he released his first album Emre, a collection of all the songs composed up to 18 years old, including single "Addio al Terminal".

At the age of 20, Francesco enrolled at Luiss Guido Carli university, studying for a bachelor's degree in political science. However, unable to successfully pass the sociology exam in the first term, he decided to drop out.

He has represented Italy on various occasions. In 2012, he performed in Caracas with The Orchestra of El Sistema. On 2 June in Berlin, he participated in the celebrations of the Republic Day of Italy. In 2016, he performed in Los Angeles during the Day of the Music Festival. Furthermore, on December 28, 2016, he took part in a charity concert in Tbilisi alongside Nino Surgulazde, which was broadcast live on Georgian television. Throughout his solo career, he has performed in over 15 countries.

On May 19, 2017, Wayfaring was entering the top 100 most sold cds in Italy.

On August 12, 2017, Spotify has listed "Taksim" in "The Most Beautiful Songs in The World".

== Discography ==
Year	Title	Track Listing	Record label
2010	Emre	1. "Addio al Terminal"; 2. "È Sera"; 3. "Piove"; 4. "Traffico"; 5. "Marzo"; 6. "Ricordi"; 7. "Celine's"; 8. "Martinez"; 9. "Mare di Dicembre"; 10. "Esquilino"	INRI Classic; Warner Music
2012	LeVent	1. "Iris"; 2. "Sophie"; 3. "Ocean"; 4. "Walking in Brooklyn"; 5. "Zero"; 6. "Istanbul"; 7. "MyWoman"; 8. "Lotus"; 9. "Jazz Ray"; 10. "Zimmer"	INRI Classic; Warner Music
2014	Flying	1. "Falling Water"; 2. "Sidki"; 3. "Destiny"; 4. "Hush"; 5. "Bosphorus"; 6. "Sunset Over Rome"; 7. "Reinassance"	INRI Classic; Warner Music
2017	Wayfaring	1. "Introitus"; 2. "Emel"; 3. "3AM"; 4. "Midnight"; 5. "Black Sea"; 6. "Taksim"; 7. "Salento"; 8. "Cihangir"; 9. "Anatolia"; 10. "Vienna"; 11. "Estate"; 12. "Bazar"	INRI Classic; Warner Music
