= Albania–Turkey relations =

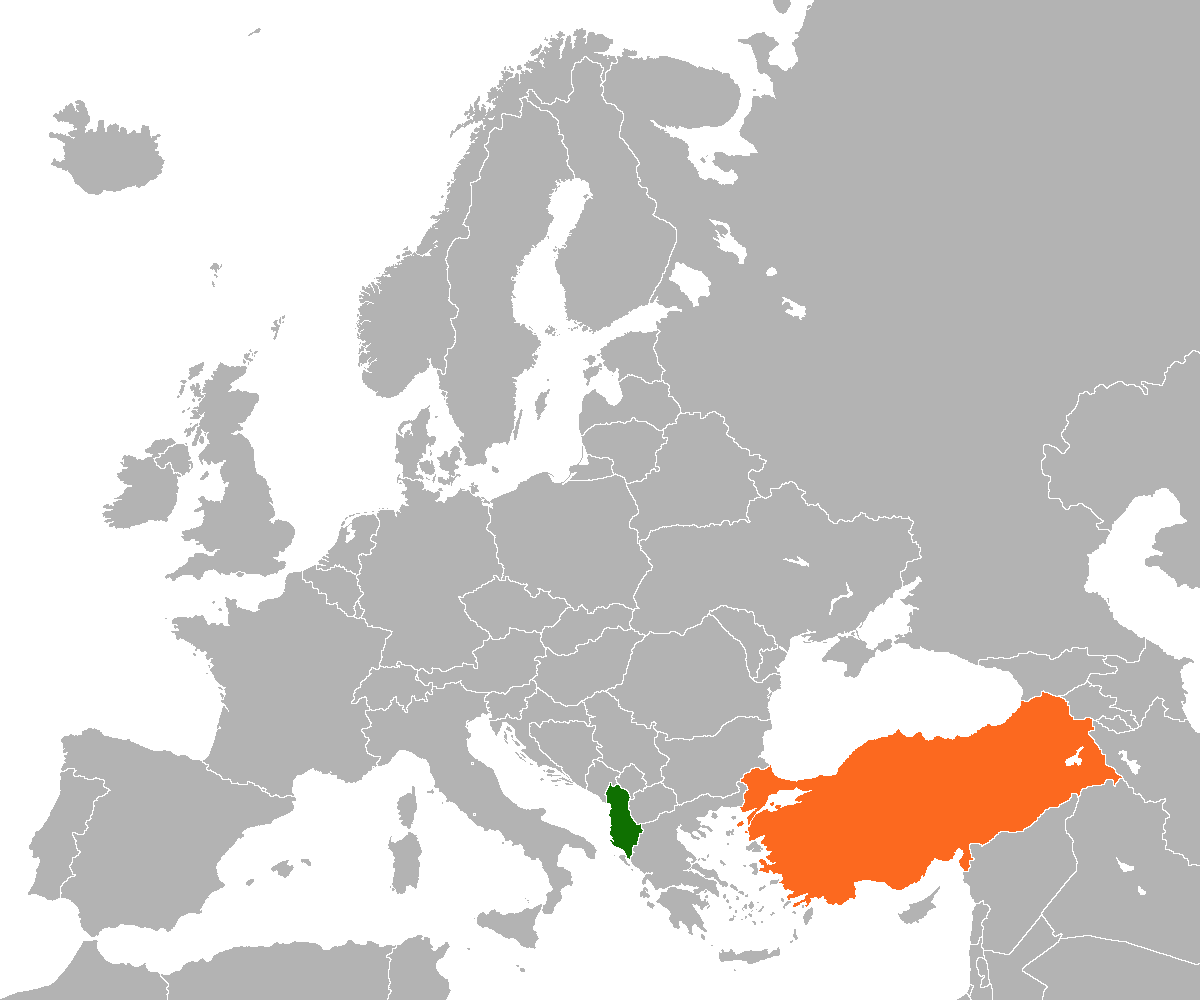
- Albania: Turkey

Diplomatic mission
- Albanian Embassy, Ankara: Turkish Embassy, Tirana

Envoy
- Ambassador: Kastriot Robo: Ambassador: Murat Ahmet Yörük

Albania–Turkey relations are the bilateral relations between the Republic of Albania and the Republic of Turkey. Albania has an embassy in Ankara and a general consulate in Istanbul. Turkey has an embassy in Tirana. Both countries are part of the Organisation of Islamic Cooperation (OIC), the North Atlantic Treaty Organization (NATO) and Union for the Mediterranean (UfM). Turkey and Albania are candidates for accession in the European Union (EU).

Albanian–Turkish relations have been characterized by geographical, historical and religious factors and the existence of numerous Albanians in Turkey. During the interwar and Cold War periods, bilateral relations at times experienced tensions and disagreements due to ideological and geopolitical circumstances of either country. In a post Cold War environment, both nations are bound by an alliance treaty of military cooperation and other agreements relating to economic, political and cultural fields. Disagreements at times have encompassed bilateral relations in relation to international affairs or the Islamist Turkish Gülen movement and its presence in Albania.

== History ==
=== Background ===
Relations between Albania and Turks date from the arrival of the Ottomans in the region in the 15th century. Many Albanians during the Ottoman period converted to the official religion Islam and contributed massively through administrative, political and military positions to the Ottoman Empire and culturally to the wider Muslim world. Albania was also culturally influenced by Ottoman Empire and Islamic World, and to a lesser extent other Ottoman territories during the period, and much of this influence remains visible today in some culinary traditions, Islamic architecture of mosques, some elements in the old cities of Gjirokastër, Berat, Shkodër, Prizren and other forms of cultural expression.

Towards the end of the Ottoman era in the 19th century, relations between the Albanian territories and the Ottoman centre rapidly deteriorated due to a number of factors, such as the swelling of Albanian nationalism, perceived betrayal by the Ottomans in defending Albanian-inhabited lands from encroachment, the weakening of the empire causing increased stridency among Christian populations, Ottoman actions against Muslim Albanian nobles, and the refusal to allow the opening of Albanian-language education. Although many Albanians backed the Young Turk reformer movement, they revolted against the new Young Turk government when it tried to impose centralization and a Turkish identity upon Albania, with the last of these revolts in 1912 ultimately leading to the independence of Albania and the First Balkan War.

The Albanian diaspora in Turkey was formed during the Ottoman era and early years of the Turkish republic through migration for economic reasons and later sociopolitical circumstances of discrimination and violence experienced by Albanians in Balkan countries during the Eastern crisis, Balkan Wars, World Wars One and Two and communism. Turkey has an estimated 1.3 to 5 or 6 million citizens of full or partial Albanian descent, and some still feel a connection to Albania.

=== Balkan Wars, WWI, Interwar period, WWII (1912–1944) ===
Albania's modern relations with Turkey commenced after the declaration of independence (28 November 1912) from the Ottoman Empire. International recognition of Albanian independence entailed the imposition of a Christian monarch, which, alongside internal political power struggles, generated a failed Muslim uprising (1914) in central Albania that sought to restore Ottoman rule. During the First World War contacts between Albania and the Ottoman Empire were limited. In 1921, the Ottoman Empire officially recognised the Republic of Albania, while the Turkish National Movement under Mustafa Kemal Atatürk, fighting for a Turkish republic, cultivated contacts with Albanian representatives through former Ottoman Albanian officials for establishing future bilateral relations. During the 1920s Albania adopted an approach to strengthen, develop and further interstate relations with neighboring states and other international powers such as Turkey to attain support for maintaining Albanian independence and its territorial integrity. For Albania, dealings with Ankara concerned safeguarding the interests of the large Albanian population in Turkey, who were experiencing economic and political problems. Albania also wanted to develop political and economic relations with Turkey. The aftermath of war, the Lausanne Treaty and tenuous international recognition by international powers motivated Turkey to pursue bilateral relations with Albania and other countries, to secure support for the new status quo.

Agreements were signed from 1923 onward, such as the Friendship Treaty, setting the guidelines for political and state relations between both countries, which were conducted at a consulate level. The Albanian government maintained a consulate in Istanbul. The Citizenship Agreement (1923) contained provisions for safeguarding property and citizenship rights of Turkish citizens in Albania and of Albanian nationals in Turkey, while due to the Lausanne Treaty Ankara did not uphold those protocols in relation to Christian Albanians. Albania tried and failed to convince Ankara to omit Orthodox Albanians who were regarded as Greeks from the population exchange with Greece, and to safeguard their property and assets in Turkey. Turkey claimed that conventions in the Lausanne treaty defined automatically all Orthodox people as Greeks and could not be undone for individual groups or cases. A Muslim Albanian minority resided in Chameria, north-western Greece and Tirana was concerned about their forced removal during the population exchange as some had arrived in Turkey and were living in difficult economic circumstances. Tirana insisted that incoming Cham Albanians from Greece be allowed to migrate to Albania from Turkey if they so wished. Granted that right for Albanians from Chameria, the arrangement also covered Albanians arriving in Turkey from Yugoslavia to migrate to Albania. From 1925 onward Yugoslavia sought an agreement with Turkey to allow for the migration of Muslims while Albania was concerned that it entailed the removal of Albanians from the Balkans to be resettled in depopulated parts of Turkey. Turkey reiterated its disinterest in Albanians from Yugoslavia coming to Anatolia and that the matter mainly related to ethnic Turks of Vardar Macedonia. With large numbers of Albanian refugees present in Turkey by the mid 1920s an understanding had arisen with Albania to cooperate and stem Albanian migration from Yugoslavia which decreased substantially during the remainder of the 1920s.

Between 1925 and 1928 Turkey and Albania agreed to and signed a Trade Agreement, Extradition Treaty and Consular Convention. Other issues involved failed attempts by Albania to attain Ottoman cadastre records from Turkey to update property information and Turkish failure to get Albania to take on part of its share of Ottoman financial debt. In 1925 a Turkish consulate was opened in Vlorë, southern Albania and in 1926 a Turkish embassy was opened in Tirana, Albania and an Albanian ambassador was sent to Ankara. In 1929, prime minister Ahmet Zog declared and installed himself as king due to his concerns that republican governments were unstable to counter possible geopolitical threats of larger neighbours to Albanian sovereignty. The new regime was recognised by most countries while Turkey's republican leader Atatürk refused recognition due to hard won Turkish republicanism and condemned the Albanian move on grounds that it violated republican principles and went against the interests of the Albanian people.

A crisis in bilateral relations between Tirana and Ankara occurred with most diplomatic staff recalled from Albanian consulates in Turkey and the Turkish embassy in Albania. Italy, friendly with Zog and increasingly influential in Albanian affairs under fascist leader Benito Mussolini along with Albania pressured Turkey to recognise the new monarchist regime. Attempted overtures by Albania were made to restore interstate relations with Turkey at various regional and other gatherings involving exchanges of letters and pleasantries invoking friendship and common interests of both countries by high ranking diplomatic staff. After previous agreements entered into were reinstated and others ratified by parliaments of both countries during 1933, state relations had been restored and conducted at an ambassadorial level. In 1936, a sister of Ahmet Zog married a son of former Ottoman Sultan Abdul Hamid II and bilateral relations once again went into crisis after Turkey expressed its displeasure at the event by recalling its ambassador and Albania closed its embassy in Ankara claiming budgetary issues. With the Italian and later German occupation of Albania during the Second World War, the Turkish embassy remained closed while the consulate in Vlorë remained open until 1944 when Enver Hoxha, the Albanian communist leader (1944–1985) closed it down.

=== Cold War (1945–1989) ===
During the 1950s Albanian officials representing the communist regime expressed a desire restore bilateral ties with Turkey. The Turkish embassy in Albania was reopened in 1958 and state relations between both countries were limited, due to sociopolitical effects in the aftermath of the 1960 coup in Turkey. Due to the Albanian-Soviet split Turkish intelligence took interest in Albanian affairs in 1961 expressing support for Albanian territorial integrity and Turkey lobbied some of its Western allies, in particular the US to do the same. The Albanian communist government distanced its dealings with Ankara as it was distrustful of NATO member and Western allied Turkey due to concerns that it might overthrow the regime or undermine it by spreading Western economic and cultural influences in Albania. Albania's position of isolation within Europe and Balkans during the Cold War alongside territorial issues with Greece motivated it to cast a negative UN vote on the Cyprus question regarding the island's future geopolitical status in the hope of being recognised by Turkey. As such a UN resolution (1965) on the Cyprus question received Albania's support backing Turkey that generated an atmosphere of closeness between the two countries. Albania felt threatened by its larger neighbours Yugoslavia and Greece and looked to Ankara for support with Hoxha himself preferring Turkey over Greece. In 1966 high level visits occurred and bilateral relations remained marginal. In the field of economics Albanian-Turkish relations developed during the 1970s in addition to bilateral talks on the establishment of air traffic services between both nations. These and other agreements on bilateral cooperation and exchange were signed into by Albania and Turkey that earned disapproval from Greece. In 1988 high level contacts were resumed through a Turkish foreign ministerial visit to Albania.

=== Military cooperation and geopolitical issues (1990s) ===
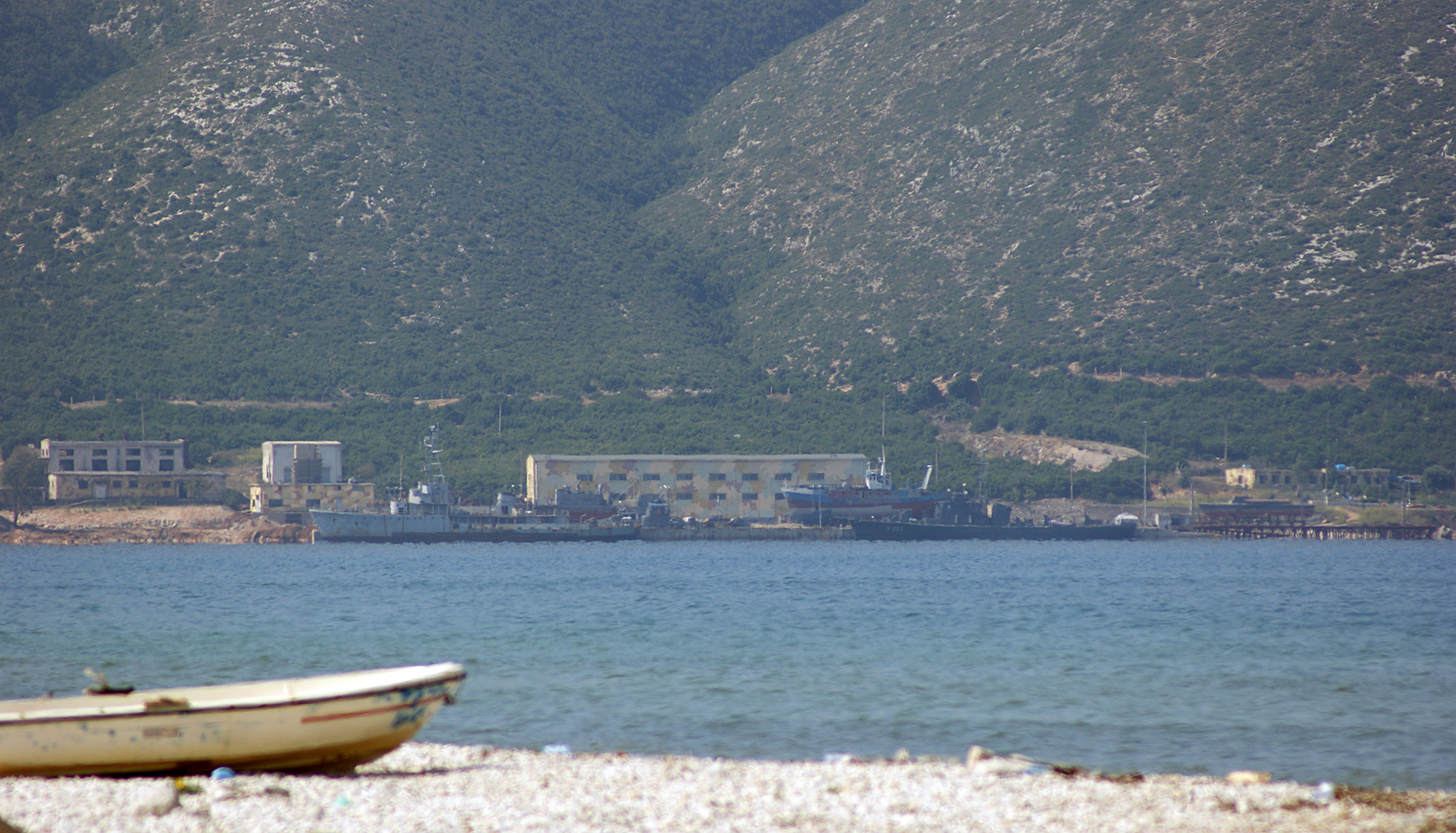
Pasha Liman Base in the Bay of Vlorë in Albania rebuilt by Turkey

The collapse of communism in Albania led to a deepening of interstate relations and cooperation with Turkey in economic, political and especially military fields. Turkey in the 1990s sought to have an expanded role in the Balkans through bilateral relations with Albania and other countries in the region. The Europeans and Americans encouraged closer Turkish relations with Albania as Turkey's presence in the region during the period was considered an element for stability. The United States, Germany along with Turkey considered the country to be of strategic value and allowed it privileged NATO treatment before other more formal agreements of the alliance such as the Partnership for Peace were adopted by Albania. Factors motivating Albania toward seeking closer interstate relations with Ankara were Ankara's experience in dealings with the EU, a shared history and the large and influential Albanian diaspora in Turkey. Turkey provided humanitarian support in the fields of policing, military and judiciary along with diplomatic assistance for Albania to apply for membership in European organisations and join others such as the Black Sea Economic Cooperation (BSEC). Turkey in the 1990s supported Albania's membership to join the Organisation of Islamic Cooperation (OIC).

Albania and Turkey have been viewed to be natural allies due to both states having disputes with Greece and the former Yugoslavia. Due to geo-political complexities and conflicts in the region Albania sought a protector power in Turkey who is a NATO member and has a modernised military. During the 1990s state relations between Albania with Turkey were marked by high level visits, military agreements and the deployment of some Turkish soldiers. An Albanian-Turkish military cooperation agreement was signed on 29 July 1992. The military agreement entailed education and training of personnel, bilateral cooperation in weapons production, joint military exercises, the exchange of military delegations and joint commissions on expanding further military ties into the future. The agreement also encompassed rebuilding Albania's Pasha Liman Base in the Bay of Vlorë on the Adriatic Sea by the Turks, in return for granting Turkey access and use. Albania welcomed increased pledges for Turkish military and economic assistance.

A month after the military cooperation agreement was signed, a Turkish warship was dispatched to the port of Durrës. The action was regarded as signifying Turkey's commitment to Albanian security which was warmly received by the Albanian population. Albania and Turkey have undertaken joint naval exercises off the Albanian coast. Turkey partook in restructuring the Albanian army and providing military aid while the Turkish leadership has expressed that Albania's security is closely bound to that of Turkey's. Turkey has trained Albanian Armed Forces, in particular officers and commando units. During Albania's unrest in 1997, Turkey alongside other countries participated in Operation Alba by providing a brigade of 800 Turkish troops to restore order and its involvement served mainly as a stabilising force.

Overall bilateral relations during the 1990s between Albania and Turkey continued to be good. Turkey considers its friendship with Albania as important due to the context of state relations with Greece and through policy have exploited difficulties arising in Albanian-Greek relations. Having a powerful ally in Turkey has suited Albania at times regarding difficult interstate relations with Greece. Relations with Albania allow Turkey to potentially exert pressure on Greece on two fronts. Reports during the 1990s alluded to Turkey obtaining military bases in Albania along the border with Greece allowing Turkey to encircle that country and such developments are viewed as a threat by the Greek side. The military alliance during the 1990s between Turkey and Albania was also aimed against Serbia in case a war over Kosovo had a wider regional spread.

Greece has expressed concerns regarding Turkish relations with Albania and interpreted them as an anti-Greek measure to isolate Greece within the wider context of Albania being a potential outlet for expanding Muslim influence and Turkey allying with Muslim populations in the Balkans. Turkey on the other hand claimed Greece increased tensions within the region and conveyed concerns relating to Albanian and Greek polemics with Ankara expressing a partial bias on Albania's side angering the Greeks. Greece, aware of Albanian-Turkish military agreements denounced Turkey's interference in Greek affairs. Some conservative Serbs expressed concerns over Albanian-Turkish relations while some Greeks feared that Turkey was attempting to revive the Ottoman era. Turkey denied those charges and its activist approach in Albania during those years was toward generating stable and secular approaches with localised solutions for problems in the region and to safeguard economic interests in the Balkans.

Not officially considered in Turkey as a rival within Albania, during the unrest of 1997 Greece was able to become an influential actor in Albania and the early period of the Kosovo crisis (1998–1999) when Albanian officials looked to Greece for assistance. Turkey viewed the government (1997–1998) of Fatos Nano as having a pro-Greek orientation and expressed some dissatisfaction though during that time still maintained close military relations with Albania in rebuilding its armed forces and a military base. The resumption of closer Albanian-Turkish relations ensured during the Kosovo crisis that made both countries act along the same policy lines toward Slobodan Milošević and the issue of Greater Serbia.

=== Deepening of relations and sociopolitical differences (2000s-present) ===
Interstate relations between Albania and Turkey after the Kosovo crisis were toward upholding military and economic cooperation. High level visits by Turkish and Albanian presidents and prime ministers to Turkey and Albania occurred with issues such as Kosovo alongside other regional and international matters of mutual interests being discussed. Visa-free travel was established between Albania and Turkey during November 2009 and as of 2 February 2010, citizens of either state may freely visit the other country for up to 90 days without visas.

Minor differences have arisen over the years in the Albanian-Turkish relationship. In 2012 the Albanian government planned to vote no regarding UN recognition of Palestinian statehood and pressure from Turkey for Albania to vote yes was applied with the end result being an Albanian abstention and Turkish dissatisfaction. The presence and influence of the Turkish Gülen movement in Albania has recently been a source of tension with the Turkish government headed by Recep Tayyip Erdoğan since it has blamed the movement for attempting to destabilize Turkey. The Turkish government classifies the movement as a terrorist organisation and called for the closure of Gülen schools, however the Albanian government to date has refused such requests stating it is an internal matter.

In 2013 during the Turkish Gezi Park demonstrations, small Albanian protests supporting the Turkish opposition and rallies in support of President Erdogan were held in Tirana. Some tensions arose over some Gülen members who fled Turkey for Albania, as the Turkish government sought their return. In response, Albania over time has turned down requests by Turkish Gülen members for Albanian citizenship. Turkey also has called for Albanian private firms and state agencies to sack local graduates with a Gülen education. In the late 2010s, Turkey has used its Maarif Foundation as an alternative counter to Gülen schools in Albania for providing Turkish-backed education by acquiring local educational institutions. Some Albanians in politics and the education system have opposed the moves and claimed it is outside interference. Albania has faced pressure from the Turkish government to declare the Gülen organisation illegal and remove people associated with it from the country.

State relations overall are friendly and close, due to the Albanian population of Turkey maintaining some links with Albanians of Albania and vice versa as Ankara maintains close socio-political, cultural, economic and military ties with Tirana. Turkey has been supportive of Albanian geopolitical interests within the Balkans. The Turkish state is seen as a traditional ally of the Albanians and the West and one of the main reasons for Albanian friendship with Turkey is due to its support for Kosovan independence. Turkey's foreign policy supports the market economy and democracy in Albania alongside prioritising state relations with Western European countries and the USA regarding Tirana while supporting pan-Balkan Albanian issues such as Albanian sociopolitical rights in Macedonia and Serbia.

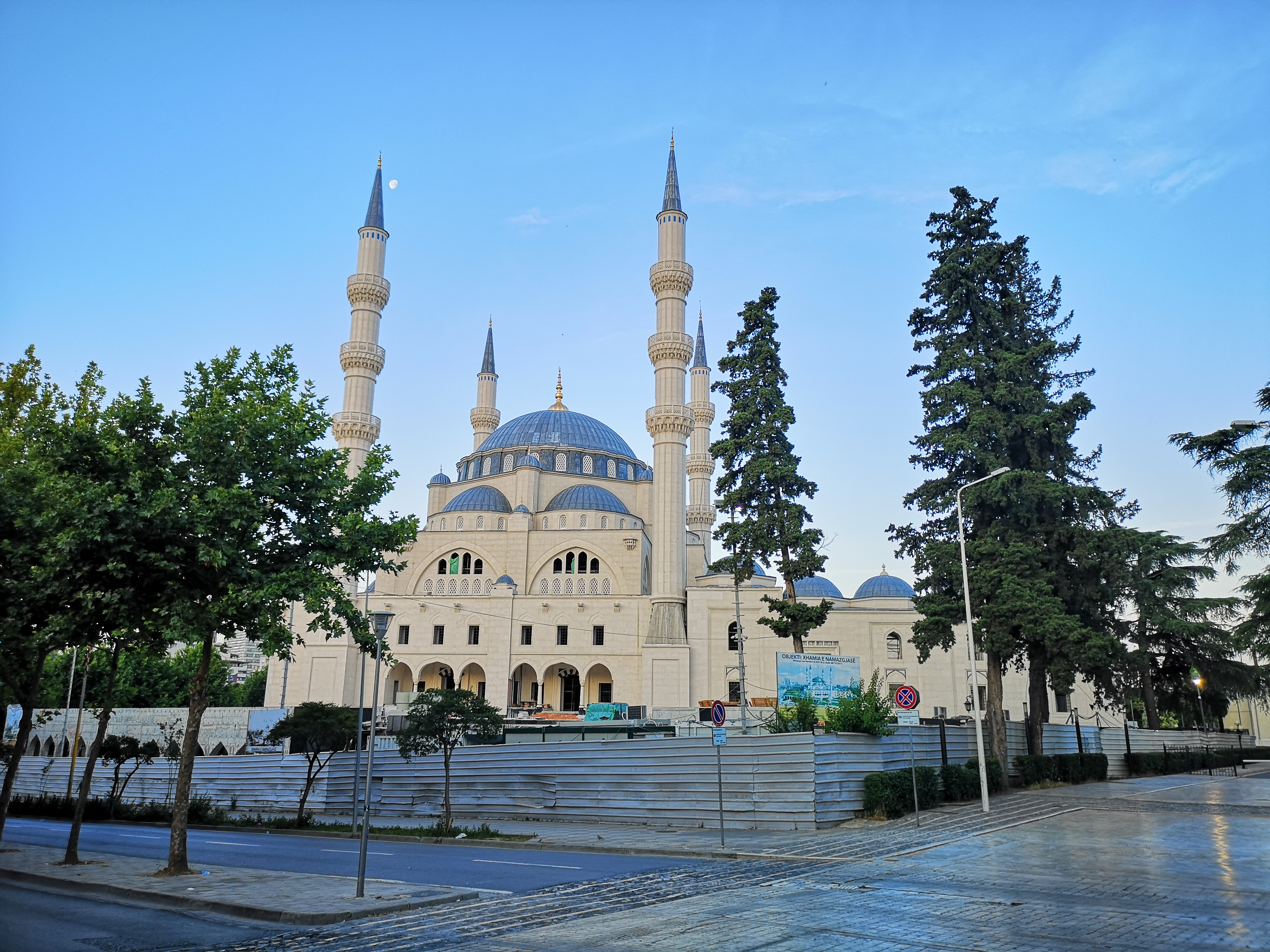
Great Mosque of Tiranë nearing construction end, June 2020

Albania's emergence in the Balkans as a key NATO partner contributed to good and stronger Albanian-Turkish relations, in particular relating to military matters. Turkey supported Albania's membership to become part of NATO. Military cooperation between Albania and Turkey is viewed by NATO as a stabilising factor within the volatile region of the Balkans. Albania has come to depend heavily on Turkish assistance and a high amount of military security. Turkey remains for Albania an important military ally alongside the USA. Through its military personnel, Turkey trains Albania's armed forces and provides assistance for Albanian military logistical and modernising endeavours. Radar systems for the surveillance of Albanian airspace in addition to telecommunication equipment have been supplied by Turkey to Albania. Albania receives Turkish assistance for police training. Turkey has worked together with Albania in the NATO mission to Afghanistan.

Turkey has continuously supported Albania from the 1990s on EU related matters as both countries view EU membership as an eventual final goal and common objective. The current AKP Turkish political leadership has acknowledged that there are large numbers of people with Albanian origins within Turkey, more so than in Albania and neighbouring Kosovo combined and are aware of their influence and impact on domestic Turkish politics. Turkey's interstate relations with Albania are shaped mostly on considerations of common heritage and historical ties dating from the Ottoman period. Contemporary Turkish policy in the Balkans is based upon peoples that share common interests such as the Bosniaks and Albanians with Albania viewed as a barometer of its Balkan policy. Turkey considers a failure to support the security and stability of Albania as undermining its ability to be as influential in the region as it would prefer to be.

Under current Prime Minister Edi Rama, he has strengthened ties with Turkey and maintains a good personal relationship with President Erdogan. Rama views Turkey as an important strategic partner. Critics state that the pro-Turkish position weakens Albania's Euro-Atlantic direction, whereas pro government media and officials present ties with Turkey in a positive light.

In Albania opposition has arisen from some commentators such as Piro Misha expressing opinions that closer state relations with Turkey is neo-Ottomanism and a "danger" that makes non-Muslim communities in the country uncomfortable due to their negative historic experience of the Ottoman period. In debates over Albanian school textbooks where some historians have asked for offensive content regarding Turks to be removed, some Christian Albanian historians protested this, referring to negative experiences of the Ottoman period and argued that Turkey should apologise for the "invasion" of Albania and Islamisation of Albanians. Though many Albanians hold (nationalist) interpretations of history with a dichotomy of "bad" Ottomans versus "good" anti-Ottoman Albanian forces like Skanderbeg, interstate relations of Albanians and Turkey are very good. Opposition to Turkey building mosques in Albania or exerting its political influence exists among part of the population. They view Turkey as an interfering or autocratic power and Islam as a negative imposed Ottoman legacy. In a Gallup poll conducted in 2010, Turkey is viewed as a friendly country with a positive image among a large majority (73 percent) of people in Albania.

==== 2019 Albanian earthquake ====
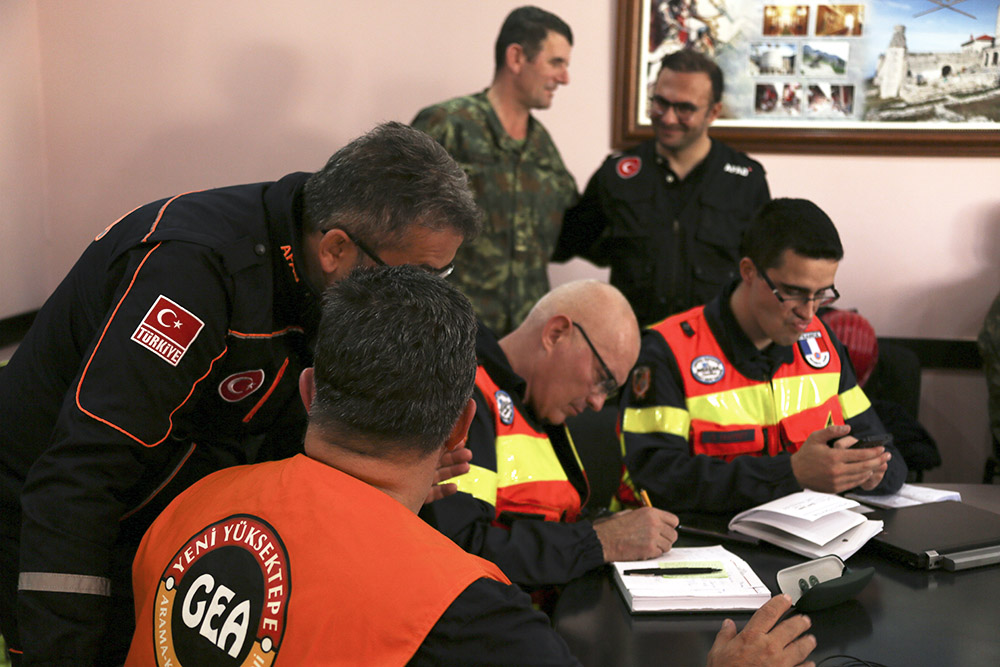
Turkish and other international search and rescue teams coordinating efforts

On 26 November 2019, an earthquake struck the Durrës region of Albania. The day after the earthquake Turkey through its authority for Disaster and Emergency Management (AFAD) sent one Airbus Atlas airplane with 28 search and rescue personnel, three vehicles, dozens of hygiene kits and tents, and 500 blankets and 500 food packs containing flour, sugar, pasta, oil, rice, beans and other products to the victims of the earthquake. Turkey sent a convey of trucks with additional humanitarian aid consisting of 100 hygiene kits, 120 tents and 2,750 blankets. Turkey used local branches of its aid agency Turkish Cooperation and Coordination Agency (TIKA) in Albania to coordinate distribution and deliver aid. On 3 December, tents were delivered by a Turkish airplane for villagers that preferred to remain near their animals and land during the winter.

President Erdogan expressed his condolences, called for aid from other Muslim countries and stated he will lobby them to give assistance to Albania for future reconstruction. Prime minister Edi Rama expressed his gratitude for Turkish aid to earthquake victims. Erdogan, citing close Albanian-Turkish relations, committed Turkey to reconstructing 500 earthquake destroyed homes and other civic structures in Laç, Albania. In Istanbul, Turkey held a donors conference (8 December) for Albania that was organised and attended by Erdogan and included Turkish businessmen, investors and Prime Minister Rama. Turkey has funded (€42 million) and constructed 522 apartments for 522 families in Laç, and two schools within the region. In mid January 2022, a ceremony was held in Laç and the apartment project was opened by President Erdogan during his visit.

==== 2020s ====
On 12 February 2020, the Turkish Foreign Minister Mevlüt Çavuşoğlu and his Albanian counterpart Gent Cakaj signed three agreements on mutual recognition of driving licenses, an agreement on university exchanges and a declaration on closer cooperation on combating crime and terrorism. Albania also purchased an anti-drone system from Turkey.

On 6 January 2021, Prime minister Rama and President Erdogan signed an agreement to establish the High Council for Strategic Cooperation and upgrade the relationship of both states to a strategic partnership. Other agreements signed related to the economy, education, tourism, health and military. Prior to the Albanian April election, in early 2021 Turkey built a modern regional hospital in Fier costing €70 million and placed under the joint administration of both countries with a mixed Albanian and Turkish medical workforce. In July 2021, Albania, participated in a Turkish organised military exercise that also included Qatar, Pakistan, Uzbekistan, Kazakhstan and Azerbaijan. Albania in July 2021 agreed to purchase Turkey's Bayraktar TB2 drones for €8.2 million with intended Albanian drone use for military and civilian matters. In mid January 2022, President Erdogan visited Albania and a series of agreements were signed for law enforcement, tourism, emergency management, media and culture. During the visit, Erdogan opened Tirana's old Ethem Bey Mosque, after a restoration by TIKA. In late December 2022, Albania purchased three Turkish Bayraktar TB2 drones, intended for police use and possible military deployment over future challenges concerning national security.

== Cultural relations ==
In a post-Ottoman environment, Albanian independence and the establishment of the Turkish republic caused changes due to nationalism to Islamic religious institutions that became independent in both respective countries. An Islamic congress held in 1923 and supervised by the Albanian government was convened by Sunni Muslim representatives to consider reforms which adopted a measure that broke ties with the Caliphate in Istanbul to establish local Muslim structures and institutions loyal to Albania. The Albanian branch of the Sufi Bektashi order in 1922 at an assembly of 500 delegates in Albania renounced ties with Turkey. In 1925 the Bektashi Order whose headquarters were in Turkey moved to Tiranë to escape Atatürk's secularising reforms and Albania would become the center of Bektashism.

In a post-communist environment, Albanians from the Muslim community have favourably viewed the efforts of Turkish Muslim organisations like the Gülen movement's Sema foundation being involved in areas such as schools. The Turkish Gülen movement based on Muslim values of preacher Fethullah Gülen has been present in Albania from 1992 onward with its institutions viewed by Albanians as a counterweight to more conservative Muslim organisations from Arab states, especially during the early 1990s. Of the 7 Albanian madrasas (Muslim colleges containing complementary religious instruction) the Gülen movement administers 5 alongside other schools that hold a reputation for high quality and mainly secular education based on Islamic ethics and principles. Some 3,000-6,000 Albanian students study in Turkish run schools within Albania. In April 2011, Bedër University, Albania's first Muslim university was opened in Tiranë and is administered by the Gülen movement. Turkey funds scholarship programs and allows for large numbers of Albanians to study there.

The main state-run Turkish Muslim organisation Diyanet has worked together with Albanian authorities and organisations to assist and provide the ability for students and imams to pursue Islamic theological studies in Turkey. The Diyanet also organises for Albanians to conduct the Muslim hajj or pilgrimage to Mecca, Saudi Arabia. Currently the Diyanet has funded and started construction of the Great Mosque of Tiranë in 2015. The mosque will be the Balkans largest with minarets 50 meters high and a dome of 30 meters built on a 10,000-square-meter parcel of land near Albania's parliament building able to accommodate up to 4,500 worshipers. From 1990 onward Turkey has funded renovations and restorations of Ottoman era mosques in Albania through a Turkish government organisation, the Turkish International Cooperation and Development Agency (TIKA). As of 2021, some €20 million has been spent by Turkey on undertaking 500 restoration projects in Albania. In other areas relating to cultural influences, Turkish soap operas have increased in popularity within Albania.

In 2016, as part of a state project named "living languages and accents in Turkey" the Turkish government accepted the Albanian language as a selective course for its schools and announced that classes would start in 2018, first being piloted in areas with people of Balkan origins. The first inaugural Albanian language class opened (2018) in a school within the Izmir area, attended by the Turkish and Albanian education ministers İsmet Yılmaz and Lindita Nikolla. In January 2021, the education ministers of both countries signed an agreement that Albanian will be taught in Turkish schools and Turkish in Albanian schools as optional foreign language subjects for any of their students to undertake.

== Economic relations ==
Albanian-Turkish economic relations began in the late 1980s after both countries signed the Agreement on Trade and the Agreement on Industrial, Commercial, Technical and Economic Cooperation. In the aftermath of the collapse of Albanian communist regime (1992), Turkey provided Albania with substantial monetary aid, energy supplies in the form of electricity and assisted Albania toward transitioning into a market based economy. Turkey, undertaking strategic economic investments entered the Albanian economy through Islamic banks and aggressively invested in it, however economic relations during the 1990s were more limited as Turkish companies had to compete in Albania with Italian and Greek businesses. Two additional agreements, the Agreement on Mutual Promotion and Protection of Investments (1996) and the Agreement for the Prevention of Double Taxation (1998) were entered into by Albania with Turkey outlining the legal parameters of economic relations in a post communist era.

Turkey's involvement and leverage within a political and economic context has deepened in Albania and the wider Balkans from the 2000s onward, due to the endeavours of the ruling AKP party wanting closer relations with countries that have Ottoman heritage and geo-political relevancy. Turkey has become an important trading partner for Albania with its trade turnover being 6 percent in the country and the 34 percent of all imports in Albania were Turkish in the early 2010s. Turkey has invested in Albania's construction industry and contributed to 15 percent of all foreign investment in the country. Turkish construction projects and investments have been toward key areas such as the building of strategic highways and airports while construction contracts in the early 2010s totalled $580 million in Albania. Additional Turkish investments have been toward economic sectors like energy and resources, banks, the building and manufacturing industries and telecommunications with Turkey being one of the top three investors in Albania. Other investments by private Turkish companies and businesses have been toward Albanian shops, restaurants, dental clinics and a shoe factory. By the early 2010s, Turkish investments in the Albanian economy had reached €1.5 billion.

== See also ==
- Albanians in Turkey
- Greece–Turkey relations
- Accession of Albania to the European Union
- Foreign relations of Albania
- Foreign relations of Turkey
- Turks in Albania
- Kosovo–Turkey relations
- Serbia–Turkey relations
- Albanian-Ottoman wars
- Albania under the Ottoman Empire
