= Kosovo–Turkey relations =

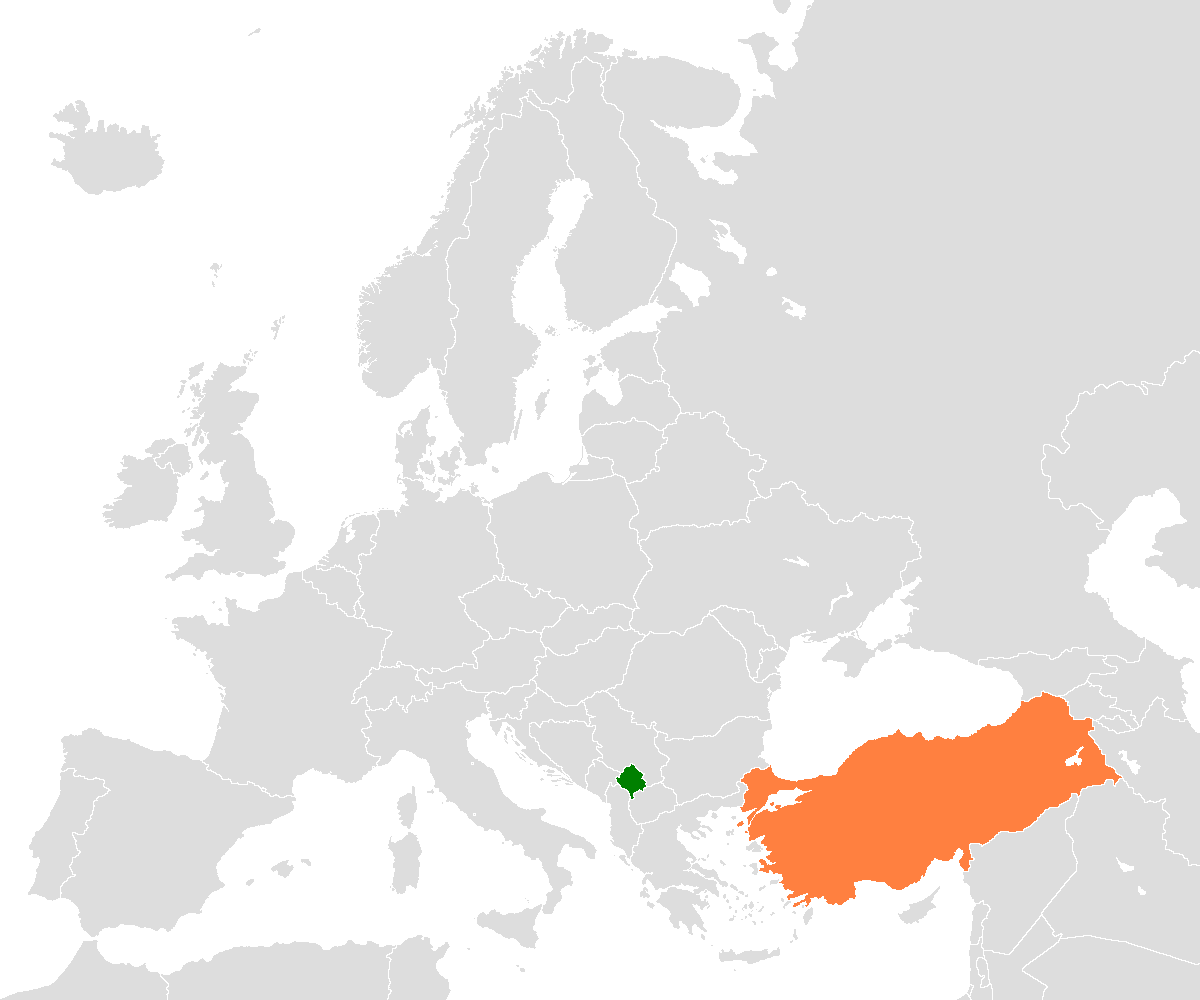
- Kosovo: Turkey

Diplomatic mission
- Embassy of Kosovo, Ankara: Embassy of Turkey, Pristina

Envoy
- Ambassador Avni Spahiu: Ambassador Sabri Tunç Angılı

Kosovo–Turkey relations are the historic and current bilateral relations between the Republic of Kosovo and the Republic of Türkiye. Kosovo has an embassy in Ankara and a consulate general in Istanbul, and Turkey has an embassy in Pristina and a consulate general in Prizren. Both nations are predominantly Muslim, have close cultural, historical, and military ties, and both have sought to join the European Union. Turkey gives full support to Kosovo's membership bids to the Council of Europe and NATO.

== Background ==
Relations between Albanians, the ethnic majority in Kosovo, and Turkey date back from the arrival of the Ottomans to the region in the 15th century. Many Albanians during the Ottoman period converted to the official religion Islam and contributed through administrative, political, and military positions to the Ottoman Empire and culturally to the wider Muslim world. The Albanian diaspora in Turkey was formed during the Ottoman era and early years of the Turkish republic through migration for economic reasons and later sociopolitical circumstances of discrimination and violence experienced by Albanians in Balkan countries. The Balkan Wars (1912–1913) expanded the Albanian diaspora in Turkey as large numbers of Muslim refugees arrived in Istanbul and Anatolia overwhelming the abilities and resources of Ottoman authorities to provide food, shelter, personal registration and documentation. Descendants from these Albanians form the largest portion of the Albanian community in Turkey. Ottoman authorities aware of the demographics of Kosovo and Macedonia understood that a large portion of the unregistered refugees migrating toward Eastern Thrace and Anatolia were Albanian and many of them had congregated in urban centres like Karacabey, Edremit, Değirmendere, Karamürsel, Kirmasti and Bursa.

Before its independence, Kosovo was an Albanian-majority part of Yugoslavia, and later Serbia. From 1925 onward Yugoslavia sought an agreement with Turkey to allow for the migration of Muslims and Albania was concerned that it entailed the removal of Albanians from the Balkans to be resettled in depopulated parts of Turkey. Turkey reiterated to Albania its disinterest in Albanians from Yugoslavia coming to Anatolia and that the matter mainly related to ethnic Turks of Vardar Macedonia. With large numbers of Albanian refugees present in Turkey by the mid-1920s an understanding had arisen with Albania to cooperate and stem Albanian migration from Yugoslavia which decreased substantially during the remainder of the 1920s. Between 1923 and 1939 however, 115,000 Yugoslav citizens migrated to Turkey and both Yugoslavian and Turkish sources note that the majority of migrants were Albanian. Albanian scholars from Albania and Kosovo place the number of Albanian immigrants in the hundreds of thousands. As there is no access to the Turkish Foreign Ministry archive regarding this issue, the total numbers of Albanians arriving to Turkey during the interwar period are difficult to ascertain. Turkey attempted to resettle these Albanians in eastern Anatolia within areas such as Yozgat, Elazığ, and Diyarbakır though many Albanians eventually settled in Eskişehir, Kocaeli, Tekirdağ, İzmir, Bursa and Istanbul. Albanians from Yugoslavia migrated to Turkey for a variety of reasons that included confiscations of land and redistribution to Serb colonists in Kosovo alongside the warfare between the armed Albanian Kaçak resistance movement active in Kosovo and north-western Macedonia with Yugoslav authorities. Yugoslav authorities viewed Albanians as a hostile population and preferred to reduce their presence in Yugoslavia, while Turkey wanted to repopulate areas of Anatolia that had been emptied of its previous Orthodox Greek speaking and Turkish speaking Christians during the population exchange.

In 1933, several visits by the Turkish foreign minister Tevfik Rüştü Aras to Belgrade in talks with the Yugoslav foreign ministry discussed the deportation of Muslims from the area of Yugoslavia that had been designated as South Serbia to Anatolia. In 1938, Aras and his Yugoslav counterpart Milan Stojadinović after five years of negotiations signed a joint convention regarding the migration of Muslim Turks to Turkey. The agreement referred to the proposed relocation of 40,000 families between 1939 and 1944 in accordance with regulations and requirements such as being fluent in Turkish, exclusion of Romani and targeting municipalities in Kosovo and western Macedonia for the migration process. Rural communities were to be mainly targeted and properties of those people deported was to be liquidated in Yugoslavia, while the journey to Anatolia from the port of Thessaloniki would be funded by Turkey and monitored by a joint Turkish-Yugoslav commission. Archival and printed literature from the period show the agreement to have been a misleading and deceptive document in its wording and intent as the outcome was for the removal of the Albanian population to Turkey. During the negotiation of the bilateral convention Atatürk met with Yugoslav authorities and later submitted the agreement to the Turkish parliament for ratification. In July 1938, some 5 months before the death of Mustafa Kemal Atatürk, the Turkish parliament refused to ratify the agreement and with the onset of the Second World War, the measure was not reconsidered. Of all those who settled in villages where Albanians became or are the only population, the language has been retained to various degrees, whereas in ethnically mixed areas language retention has been obsolete.

In a post Second World War context, Albanian migrants originated from Yugoslavia, in particular Kosovo during the 1950s–1970s often due to discrimination and or pressure exhibited by the state on Albanians to declare themselves Turkish and migrate to Turkey. Between 1952 and 1967 some 175,000 Muslims emigrated from Yugoslavia and though many were Macedonian speaking Muslims (Torbeš), Bosniaks and ethnic Turks, the majority of migrants were Albanians. Many of these Albanians from Yugoslavia settled in urban centres such as İzmir, Gemlik and Aydın. In 1999, some Albanians arrived to Turkey fleeing the conflict in Kosovo. Albanians from this third group have mainly settled in large urban centres located in western areas of Turkey. Turkey has an estimated 1.3 to 5 or 6 million citizens of full or partial Albanian descent, and many still feel a connection to Kosovo.

== 1999–2008 ==
The Balkan conflicts of the 1990s in Bosnia and Kosovo placed them high on the agenda of Turkish regional security concerns entailing Turkey becoming involved with the region. Turkey somewhat supported Kosovar Albanian national aspirations during the 1990s and Turkish intelligence service (MIT) trained members of the Kosovo Liberation Army (KLA) at a military base İzmir. The Turkish state also was distant from the crisis due to its concerns over the secessionist parameters of the Kosovo conflict and its implications for Kurdish secessionism in Turkey and also as the Turkish minority in Kosovo did not ally themselves with Albanians due to fears of being dominated by them during the struggle against the Serbs. During the 1990s, alleviating the plight of Kosovar Albanians many of whom are Muslim resonated with the Turkish population and unlike European populations of the time who had negative views of Albanians due to the activities of the Albanian mafia in their countries.

In Turkey during the Kosovo war there was a sense of historic responsibility to assist Kosovar Albanians due to them being Muslims and former "loyal" Ottoman citizens. The Turkish population was concerned over events in Kosovo and due to historical, cultural, religious and other ties to the Balkans supported their government's anti-Serb and pro-NATO position. Though expressing hesitation about a ground offensive, NATO member Turkey strongly supported and was involved in the bombing campaign against Yugoslavia supplying eighteen fighter jets.

Post-war, Turkey has assisted Kosovo regarding stability and security through OSCE, UNMIK and KFOR missions deploying 1,000 troops through the latter in 1999. Turkey currently has 540 troops serving in Kosovo as peacekeepers in the NATO led Kosovo Force. When Kosovo declared its independence from Serbia on 17 February 2008, Turkey became one of the first countries to recognise Kosovo. Turkey turned its coordination office in Pristina into an embassy after a cabinet decision to open a mission in Kosovo. The decision came in accordance with the reciprocity principle common in diplomatic relations, when Kosovo announced that it was planning to open one of its first foreign missions in Ankara.

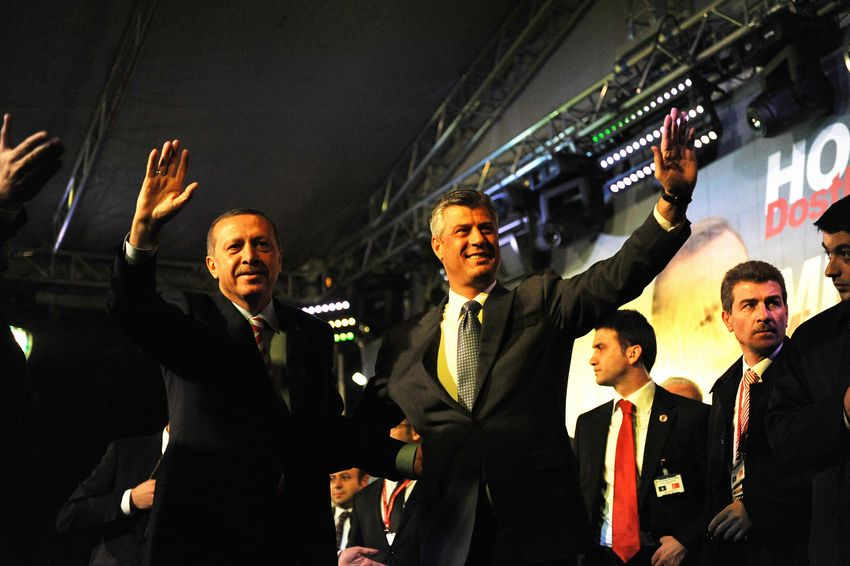
Recep Tayyip Erdoğan and Kosovar Prime Minister Hashim Thaçi in Prizren, Kosovo (2010)

From the 2000s onward, Turkey's involvement and leverage within a political and economic context was deepened in Kosovo and the wider Balkans, due to the endeavours of the ruling AKP party wanting closer relations with countries that have Ottoman heritage and geo-political relevancy. State relations of Kosovo with Turkey are friendly and close, due to the Albanian population of Turkey maintaining close links with Albanians of the Balkans and vice versa and also Turkey maintaining close socio-political, cultural, economic and military ties with Kosovo. Turkey has been supportive of Kosovar geopolitical interests within the Balkans. In the EU driven dialogue between Kosovo and Serbia, Turkey has officially supported the process to assist the region toward Euro-Atlantic integration.

== 2008–present ==
Turkey was among the first countries to recognize Kosovo’s independence on February 18, 2008, just one day after its declaration. Turkish officials have consistently supported Kosovo’s international recognition, including efforts to join the United Nations and other global organizations. Turkey maintains an embassy in Pristina, while Kosovo has an embassy in Ankara. High-level visits between leaders are frequent, strengthening political and economic ties. Turkey has also been involved in mediating regional disputes in the Balkans.

In Gallup polls conducted in recent times, Turkey is viewed as a friendly country with a positive image amongst a large majority (85 percent) of people in Kosovo. Kosovar Albanians view Turkey as a trustworthy partner toward efforts in constructing a modern European country. The closeness of Muslim traditions in Kosovo to those in Turkey has heightened the positive image and increased influence of the latter for Albanians. Turkey is viewed as a traditional ally of the Albanians and the West and one of the main reasons for friendship with Turkey is due to its support for Kosovar independence. As Kosovar Albanians have personal documentation only from the Republic of Kosovo, Turkey is one of a few places they can travel without applying for an entry permit.

In October 2013, during an official state visit by Turkish President Recep Tayyip Erdoğan, he affirmed close ties with Kosovo by stating in a speech that "We all belong to a common history, common culture, common civilisation; we are the people who are brethren of that structure. Do not forget, Turkey is Kosovo, Kosovo is Turkey!". The comments were perceived negatively in Serbia.

Turkey, a supporter of the Palestinian cause voiced its disappointment over calls for the establishment of a Kosovar Embassy in Jerusalem agreed to in the US brokered Kosovo and Serbia economic normalization agreements (2020), due to concerns it sidelined international law.

== Turkish attempts to influence Kosovar society ==
In the early 2010s, Turkey on occasion asked Kosovo to change or remove content on the Ottoman period in its school textbooks that it viewed as containing offensive material. Debates ensued among Kosovar historians about whether content was based on bias and nationalism from past times or not, while Kosovo eventually changed more emotive language in school textbooks with neutral terminology.

In February 2018, Kosovo Police prohibited an activity called "Freedom to Kurdistan" from taking place. Official reasons by the police given were there was the organizers lacked permits and that "unnamed individuals might try to cause an incident during the event that could result in consequences". Turkish media praised that ban, claiming that the event would spread pro-terrorist propaganda. Kosovo Minister of Public Administration Mahir Yağcılar condemned the planned event, calling it a "provocation" and urged people to avoid activities that would damage Kosovo's image and the country's relations with Turkey.

Turkish soap operas are very popular in Kosovo, and in 2009 it was reported that a Turkish soap opera, Aci Hajat (Acı Hayat in Turkish), was the top show in Kosovo, with over 50% viewership. Another one is Payitaht: Abdülhamid, a show known for its historical revisionism as well as its mix of antisemitic, anti-Western and conspiratorial themes. This show has become a focus of controversy in Kosovo, due to these problematic themes and messaging.

== Extradition of suspected Hizmet Movement of Turkish nationals ==
Six Turkish nationals were arrested in Kosovo on 29 March 2018 at Turkey's request over alleged links to schools financed by the Gülen movement, which Ankara blames for a failed 2016 coup. But this arrest was made in order to conceal even position and Kosovar opposition was strong against these arrests. In next day PM of Kosovo, Ramush Haradinaj sacked the Kosovo interior minister and secret service chief for failing to inform him about the arrests.

While on March 31, 2018, speaking at the local congress of the ruling Justice and Development Party (AKP) in Pendik district of Istanbul, Recep Tayyip Erdoğan stated that “You saw, our National Intelligence Organization (MİT) has packed 6 of these traitors in Kosovo and brought. Kosovo’s Prime Minister dismissed the interior minister and the person in charge of intelligence. Now, I am asking: You, the Prime Minister of Kosovo, with whose instructions did you do such a thing? Since when you are protecting those who attempted to make a coup in Turkey? You will pay the price for this. Politics cannot be done with remote control.”

On April 2, after the intervention by Haradinaj, Erdogan accused Kosovo of "harboring terrorists", and said "The Kosovo PM protects FETO terrorists on someone else’s order but my Kosovar brothers will punish him" and that "The operation in Kosovo was not the first time and will not be the last".

== Economic and cultural relations ==
The Albanian diaspora in Turkey lobbied the Turkish government for recognition of Kosovo's independence by Turkey. The number of ethnic Albanian Kosovars living in Turkey is estimated to be higher than that of those living in Kosovo itself. The current AKP Turkish political leadership has acknowledged that there are large numbers of people with Albanian origins within Turkey, more than so in Kosovo and neighbouring Albania combined and are aware of their influence and impact on domestic Turkish politics. Kosovo is the home of Mehmet Akif Ersoy, writer of the Turkish National Anthem, and many other notable Turks with an Albanian origin. There are 20,000 Turks living in Kosovo, and Turkish is one of the official regional languages of Kosovo.

Turkey has become an important trading partner for Kosovo with its trade turnover being 8 percent. Turkey has invested in Kosovo through Turkish construction projects and investments and have been focused toward key areas such as the building of strategic highways and rehabilitation and management of airports while construction contracts in the early 2010s totaled $500 million in Kosovo. Turkey is one of the top three investors and an important donor country for Kosovo. In 2020, the two countries agreed to have a cinematographic cooperation.

As of 2023, the bilateral trade volume between Turkey and Kosovo reached $785 million. Turkey’s Trade Minister Ömer Bolat announced that the trade volume is expected to reach $1 billion by the end of 2024, highlighting Turkey’s growing economic engagement with Kosovo. Key Turkish exports to Kosovo include machinery, construction materials, food products, and textiles, while Kosovo exports raw materials and minerals to Turkey.

Turkish companies have heavily invested in energy, airport operations, banking, telecommunications, and healthcare. Some of the most notable projects include:

- Pristina International Airport – Managed by Limak Holding Limak Holding, a prominent Turkish conglomerate, operates Pristina International Adem Jashari Airport. The company has been involved in significant investments to expand and modernize the airport's facilities.
- Electricity Distribution Network – Operated by Limak-Çalık Consortium The Limak-Çalık Consortium, comprising Limak Holding and Çalık Holding, acquired Kosovo's electricity distribution and supply company (KEDS) in 2013. They have committed to substantial investments to enhance the electricity distribution infrastructure in Kosovo.
- Construction Projects – Turkish Companies' Involvement Turkish construction firms have successfully completed numerous infrastructure projects in Kosovo, contributing significantly to the country's development.
- Consultancy and Technical Services – Turkish Firms' Contributions Turkish technical consultancy firms have undertaken various projects in Kosovo, providing expertise in multiple sectors.

== See also ==
- Foreign relations of Kosovo
- Foreign relations of Turkey
- Albanians in Turkey
- Turks in Kosovo
- Albania–Turkey relations
- Serbia–Turkey relations
- Turkey–Yugoslavia relations
