= Slovenia–Turkey relations =

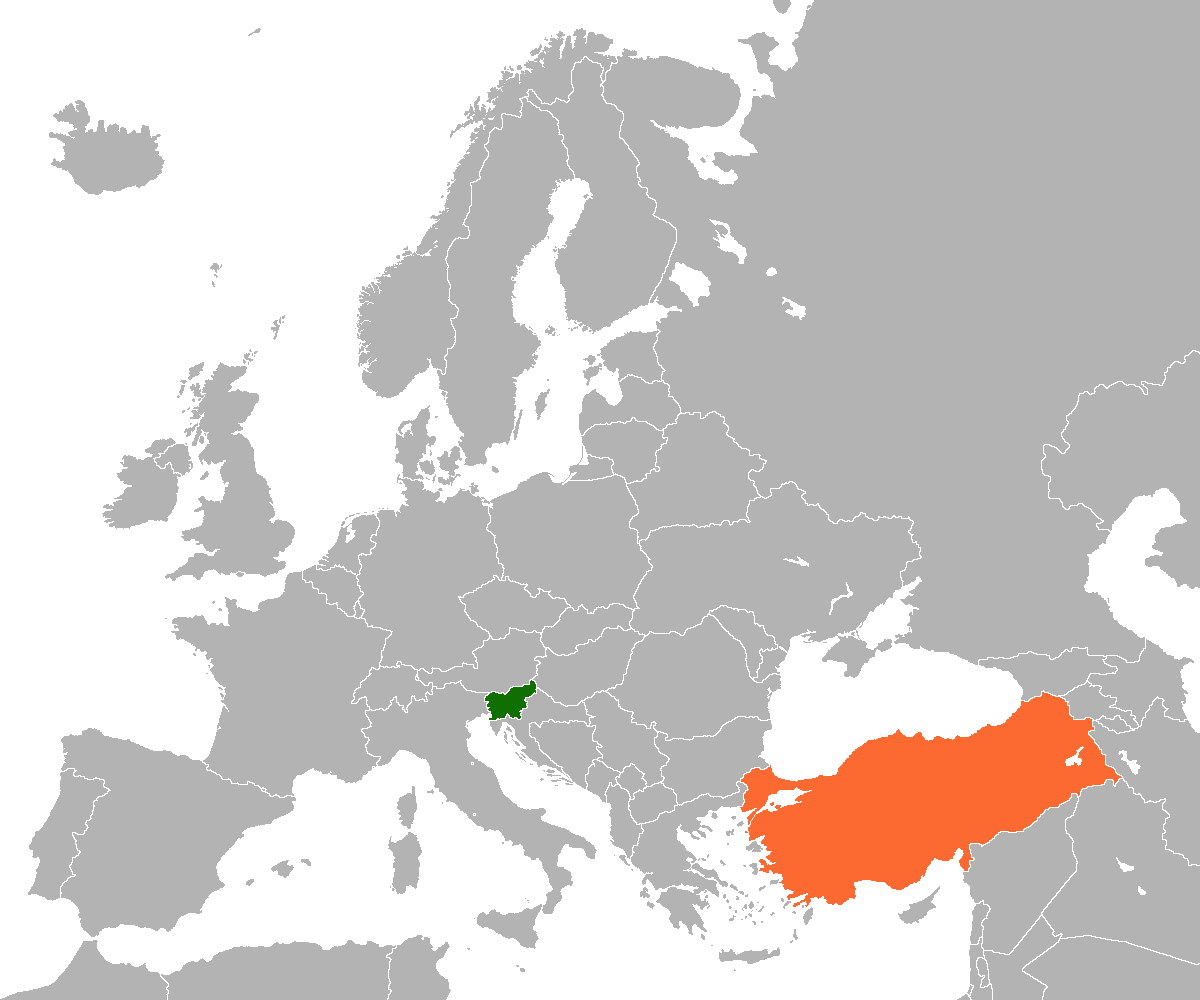

- Slovenia: Turkey

Slovenia–Turkey relations are the foreign relations between Slovenia and Turkey. Slovenia has an embassy in Ankara and Turkey has an embassy in Ljubljana. Both countries are members of NATO, as well as members of Organization for Security and Co-operation in Europe and Council of Europe. Slovenia is a member of the EU, whereas Turkey is currently an EU candidate. Slovenia, alongside Montenegro, are sectoral dialogue partner countries of the Organization of the Black Sea Economic Cooperation.

== Diplomatic relations ==
After leaving the Soviet sphere in 1948, Yugoslavia sought, then withdrew from, a Balkan alliance with Greece and Turkey. Relations between Yugoslavia and Turkey became tense in the 1970s when Yugoslavia strongly backed Greece in the Cyprus dispute and supported the Palestine Liberation Organization against Israel, which was Turkey’s closest ally in the Middle East at the time.

Following Slovenia's Declaration of Independence in June 1991, relations between Slovenia and Turkey improved considerably because both countries were strongly committed to the West and there were no historical disputes since Slovenia was never under Ottoman rule.

== Presidential visits ==
| Guest | Host | Place of visit | Date of visit |
|---|---|---|---|
| (Slovenia) President Borut Pahor | (Turkey) President Abdullah Gül | Çankaya Köşkü, Ankara | March 3, 2011 |
| (Turkey) President Recep Tayyip Erdoğan | (Slovenia) President Borut Pahor | President's Office, Ljubljana | March 30, 2015 |

== Economic relations ==
- Trade volume between the two countries was US$1.15 billion in 2015.
- In 2024, 140 Turkish companies operated in Slovenia, while 46 Slovenian firms were active in Turkey. The bilateral trade volume between Slovenia and Turkey reached 3.1 billion USD in 2024.
- According to data from the Turkish Exporters Assembly (TİM), Turkey's exports to Slovenia amounted to 371.5 million USD in January 2025, marking a record-high monthly figure.

== See also ==
- Foreign relations of Slovenia
- Foreign relations of Turkey
- Turkey-EU relations
  - Accession of Turkey to the EU
- NATO-EU relations
- Turkey–Yugoslavia relations
