= Turkey–Yugoslavia relations =

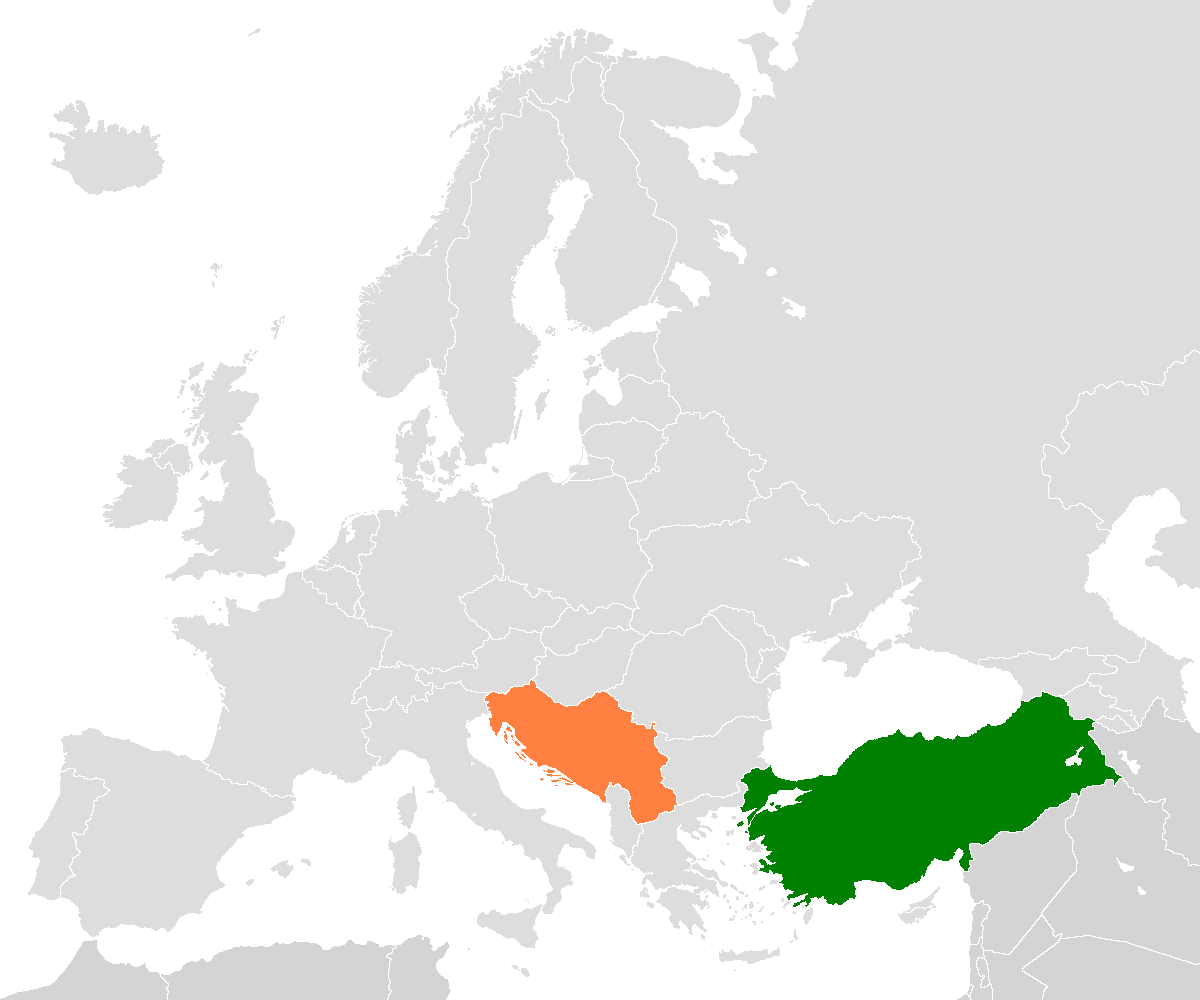

- Turkey: Yugoslavia

Turkey–Yugoslavia relations (Turkish: Türkiye-Yugoslavya ilişkileri; Serbo-Croatian: Tursko-jugoslavenski odnosi, Турско-југословенски односи; Slovene: Odnosi med Turčijo in Jugoslavijo; Macedonian: Односите меѓу Турција и Југославија) were historical foreign relations between Turkey and now broken up Yugoslavia (Kingdom of Yugoslavia 1918-1941 and Socialist Federal Republic of Yugoslavia 1945-1992).

== Country comparison ==
| Common name | Turkey | Yugoslavia |
| Official name | Republic of Turkey | Socialist Federal Republic of Yugoslavia |
|---|---|---|
| Coat of arms | | |
| Flag | | |
| Capital | Ankara | Belgrade |
| Largest city | Istanbul | Belgrade |
| Population | 55,970,155 | 23,229,846 |
| Government | Presidential representative democracy | Socialist republic |
| Official languages | Turkish | No official language Serbo-Croatian (de facto state-wide) Slovene (in Slovenia) and Macedonian (in Macedonia) |
| First leader | Mustafa Kemal Atatürk | Joseph Broz Tito |
| Last leader | Turgut Özal | Milan Pančevski |
| Religion | Secular state | Secular state (de jure), state atheism (de facto) |
| Alliances | NATO | Non-Aligned Movement |

== History ==
=== Ottoman history ===
Large parts of Yugoslavia were at one time or the other parts of the Ottoman Empire. The region experienced protracted Ottoman retreat combined with Habsburg expansion or national liberation which some authors compared to the earlier experience of Reconquista in Iberian Peninsula. Slovenia, Old Montenegro, Republic of Ragusa, Venetian Dalmatia and northwestern parts of Croatia proper were never under protracted Ottoman rule. Slavonia and Vojvodina were liberated via 1699 Treaty of Karlowitz, Serbia in the time of the 1804–1833 Serbian Revolution, Bosnia and Sandžak at the time of 1908–09 Bosnian Crisis, while Kosovo, the southernmost parts of Central Serbia and Northern Macedonia were annexed only in 1912–1913 via the First Balkan War.

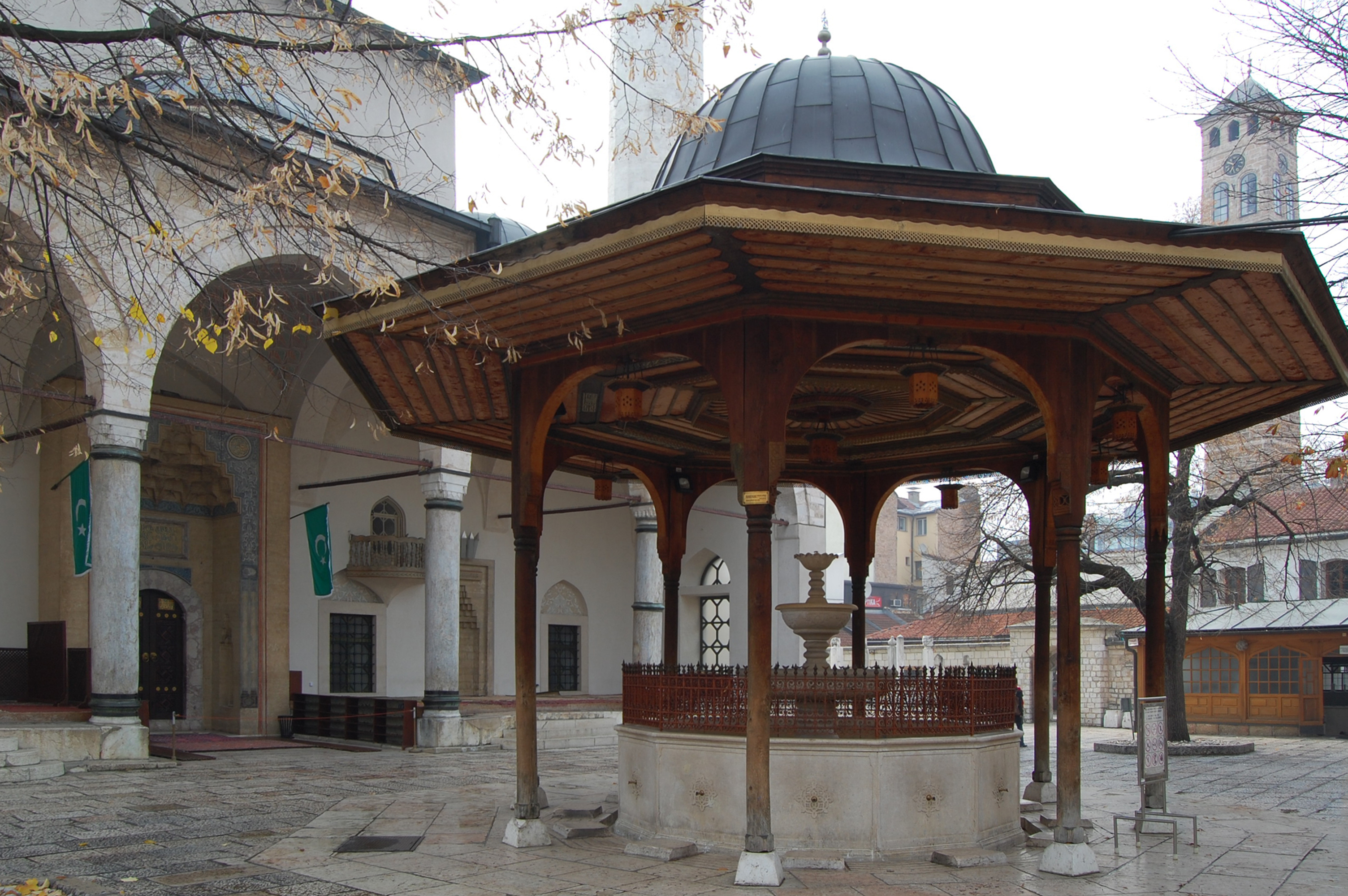
Gazi Husrev-beg Mosque

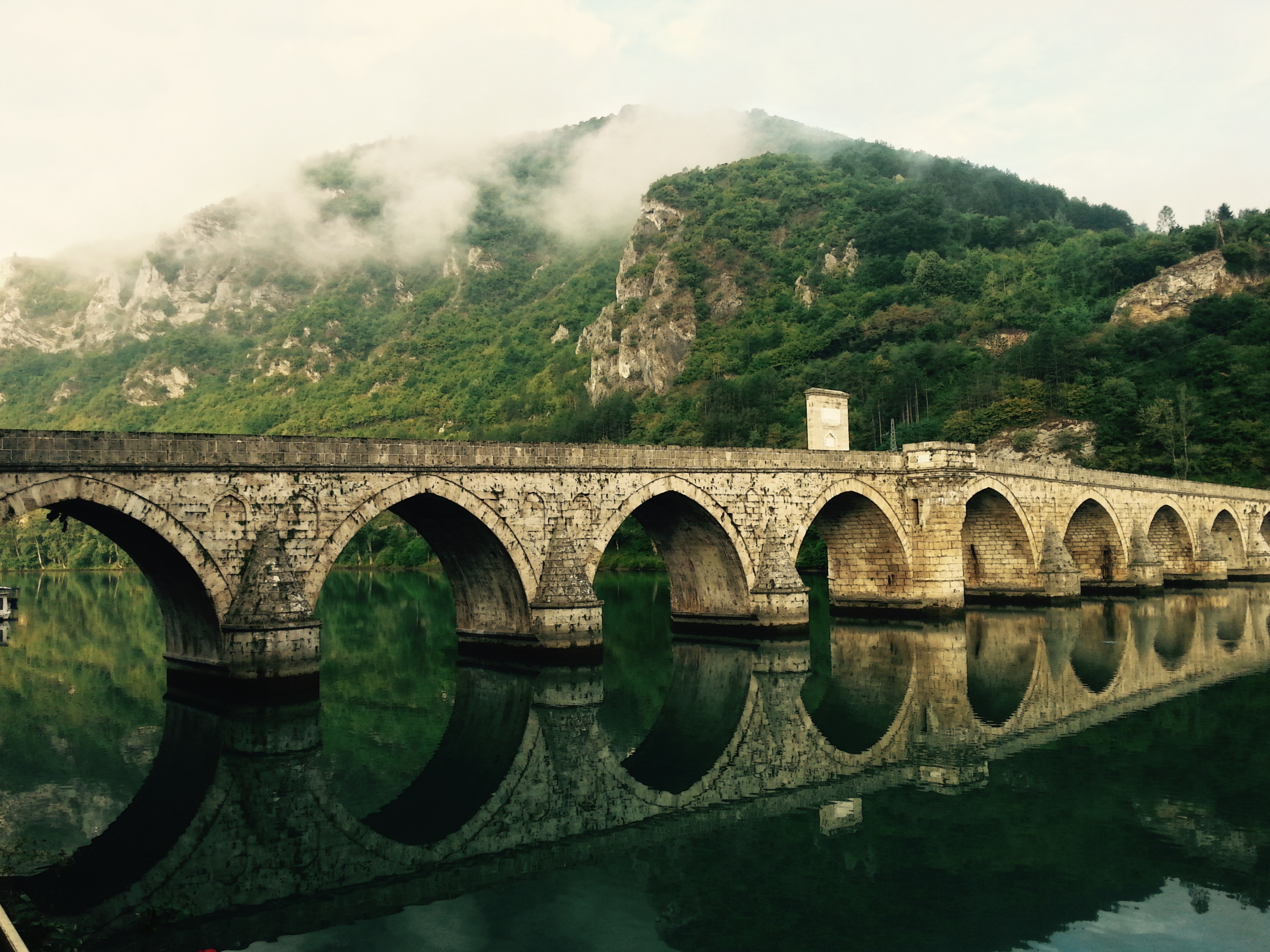
Mehmed Paša Sokolović Bridge

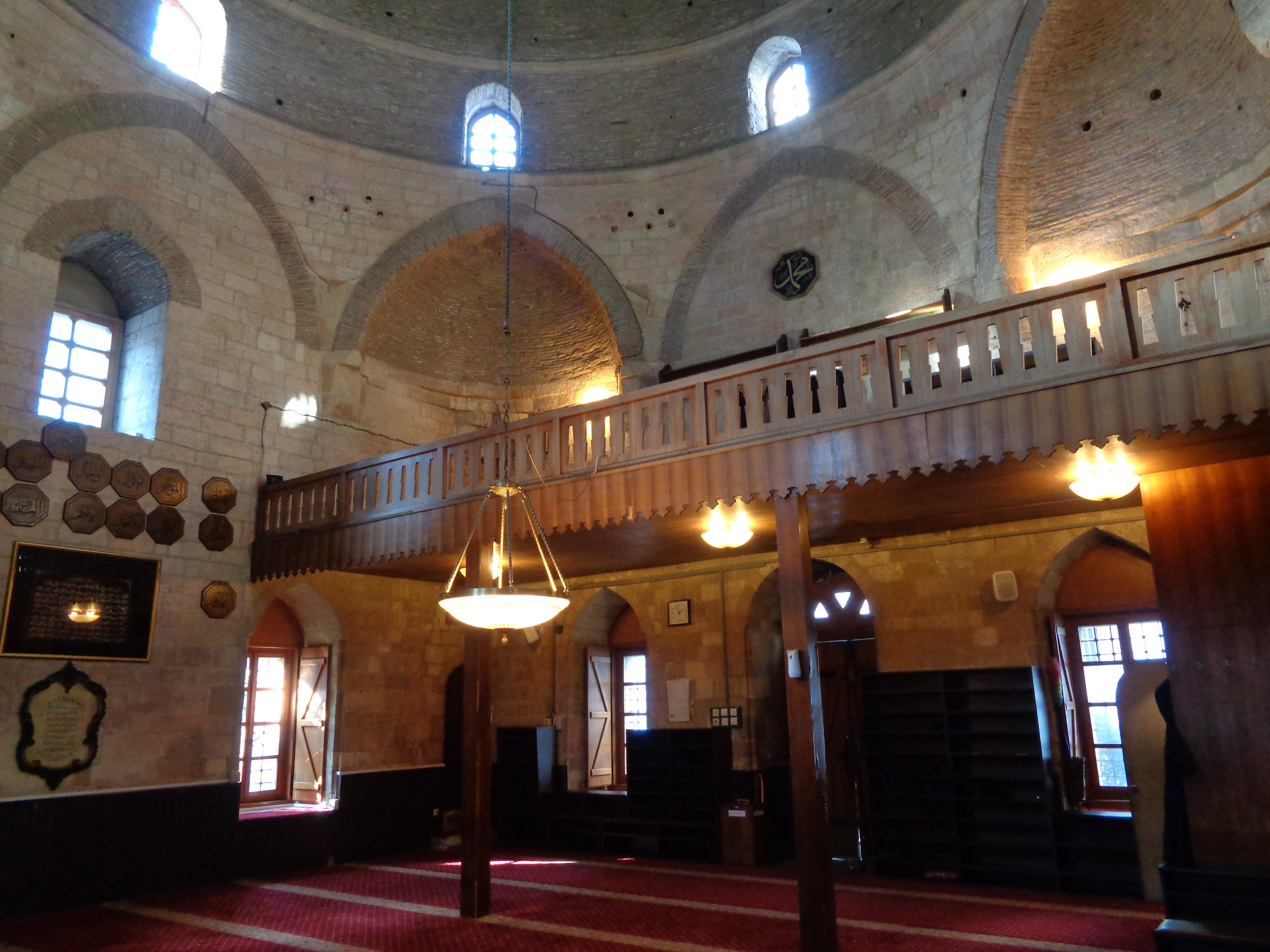
Bajrakli Mosque, Belgrade

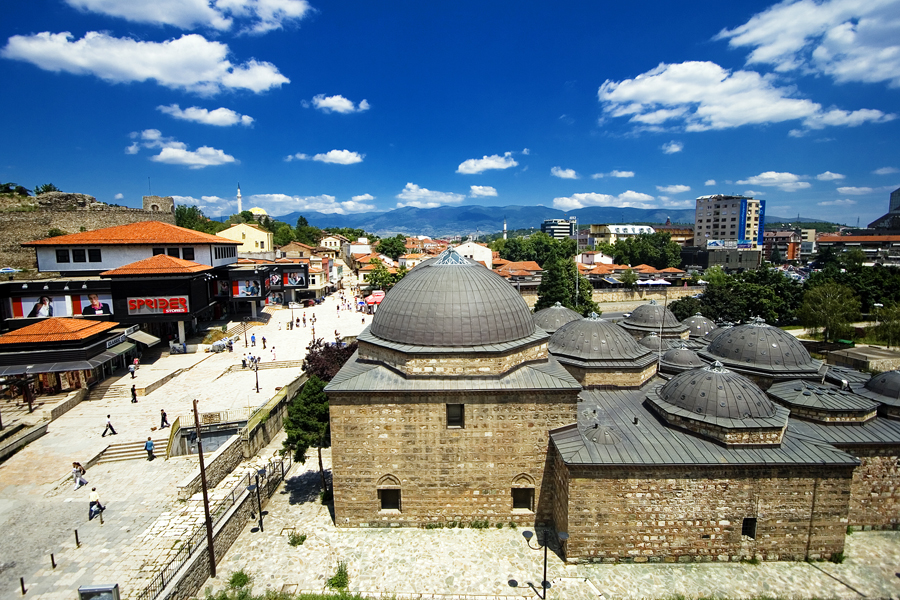
Old Bazaar, Skopje

=== Interwar period ===
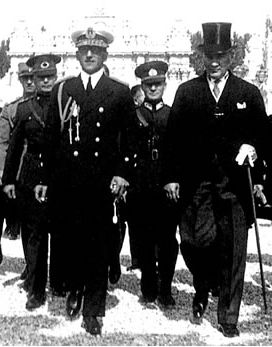
Mustafa Kemal Atatürk and King Alexander of Yugoslavia 1933.

The Turkish War of Independence slowed down the establishment of formal diplomatic relations between newly founded countries of the Republic of Turkey and the Kingdom of Serbs, Croats and Slovenes. The government of the new kingdom refused to sign the Treaty of Sèvres as it was unwilling to inherit part of the Ottoman public debt as one of the successor states. On 18 April 1924 Yugoslavia accepted its share of 5.25% or 5,435,597 Turkish lira of the total Ottoman debt. Two countries finally signed their peace and friendship agreement 28 October 1925 and it was ratified on 1 February 1926.

=== Post-World War II period ===
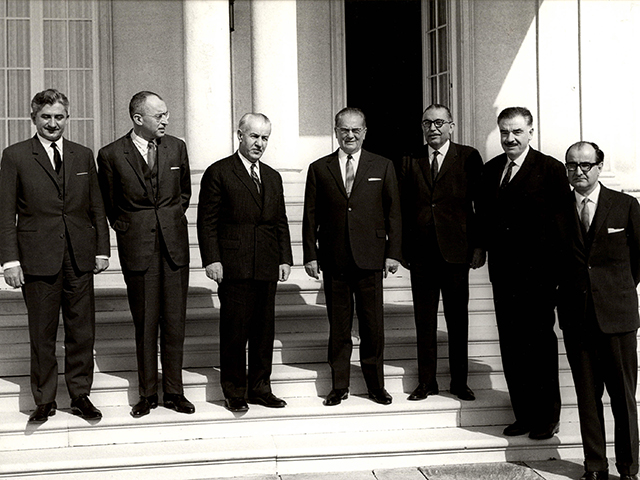
İhsan Sabri Çağlayangil (third from the left) with Josip Broz Tito (fourth from the left) in Belgrade in 1967. Minister of Foreign Affairs of Yugoslavia Marko Nikezić (second from the left).

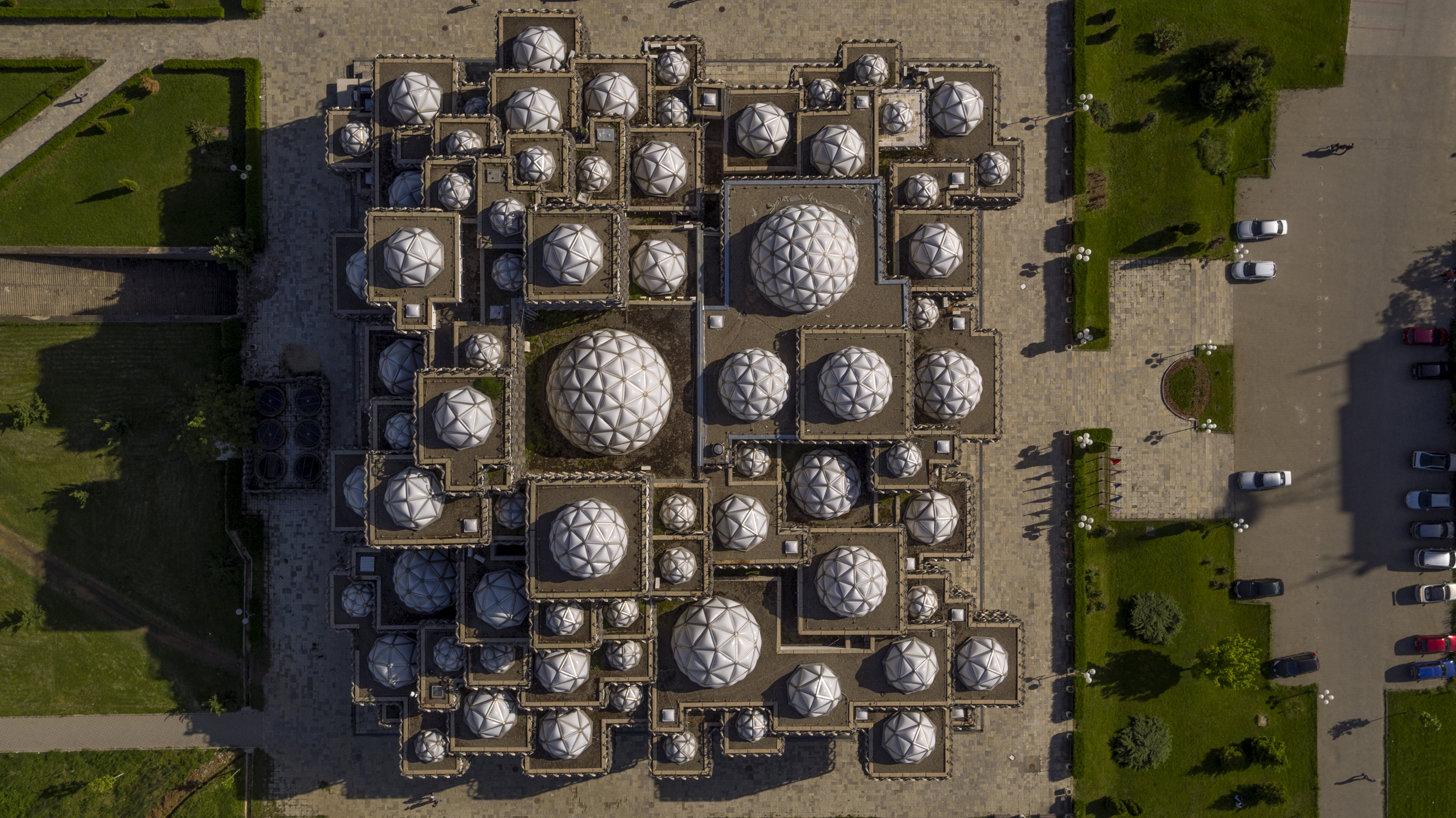
Bird's-eye-view of the National Library of Kosovo building.

In the initial years after the end of World War II in Yugoslavia the new communist authorities continued to support Muslim population emigration to Turkey. In the period between 1951 and 1956 some 86,380 Muslims, mostly from Kosovo and Macedonia, emigrated to Turkey, out of them 67,236 Turks, 4,394 Albanians, 13,926 Pomaks and 224 others. This however did not affect the relations between the two governments in any negative way as Turkey was willing to receive the new settlers. The 1948 Tito–Stalin split represented the major rupture in relations between Yugoslavia and the East Bloc after which Belgrade reoriented its foreign policy towards new allies. Despite the ideological contradictions Yugoslavia firstly cooperated closely with West Bloc nations before conditions for the development of relations with neutral and ultimately Non-aligned countries were created. Rather than to achieve the full membership in NATO Yugoslavia preferred closer cooperation with Greece and Turkey as the two NATO member states which were themselves fearing potential Soviet military intervention. In 1953 three countries organized the first tripartite talks which ended in the signing of a memorandum which stated that aggression against one of the three countries threatens the defense of others. On 28 February 1953 three countries established the Balkan Pact while on 20 April of the same year Ankara and Belgrade signed a number of agreements including the one on the dual citizenship. While Greece and Turkey strongly pushed for the full Yugoslav membership in NATO, after the death of Stalin Belgrade decided to normalize its ties with Soviet Union (Belgrade declaration) and to formulate the non-aligned foreign policy. In 1961 Yugoslav writer Ivo Andrić was awarded the Nobel Prize in Literature for his historical novel The Bridge on the Drina revolves around the Mehmed Paša Sokolović Bridge in Višegrad. In 1971 Slavic Muslims (as an ethnic group) (modern Bosniaks) were recognized as one of the constituent peoples of the Socialist Federal Republic of Yugoslavia. In 1982 Croatian architect Andrija Mutnjaković used blending of Byzantine and Islamic architectural forms when he designed the current building of the National Library of Kosovo. Turkish and Yugoslav cities which become sister cities during the time of Socialist Yugoslavia include Sarajevo-Bursa (1979) and Skopje-Manisa (1985) with many to follow after the breakup of the country.

=== Breakup of Yugoslavia and Yugoslav Wars ===
While Yugoslav Wars were bearing religious connotations and there was a perception of Turkish solidarity with Muslim communities, official Ankara pursued a very cautious policy. Careful of potential reaction among other often suspicious Balkan states and Turkish allies, Turkish government closely followed western policies and avoided any unilateral move. At the same time Bosnian War caused strong uproar domestically among the Turkish citizens. Turkey tried not to antagonize Serbia and did not cut off relations with the Federal Republic of Yugoslavia (Serbia and Montenegro) which were kept at the chargé d'affaires level once Belgrade recalled its ambassador in January 1992 and Ankara in May of the same year. Turkey notably refused to actively participate in military interventions related to the Bosnian War including its absence from the Operation Deliberate Force. It will however subsequently join the 1999 NATO bombing of Yugoslavia despite significantly decreased public interest in Kosovo War compared to Bosnia. Conflict in former Yugoslavia and absence of strong official response, similarly to earlier experience of persecution of Muslims during the 1912-1913 First Balkan War, strengthened support for Islamist and Turkish nationalist political forces.

== See also ==
- Assassination of Galip Balkar
- Bosnia and Herzegovina–Turkey relations
  - Bosniaks in Turkey
  - Turks in Bosnia and Herzegovina
- Croatia–Turkey relations
  - Turks in Croatia
- Montenegro–Turkey relations
  - Turks in Montenegro
- North Macedonia–Turkey relations
  - Macedonians in Turkey
  - Turks in North Macedonia
- Serbia–Turkey relations
  - Serbs in Turkey
  - Gallipoli Serbs
  - Asia Minor Slavs
  - Turks in Serbia
- Kosovo–Turkey relations
  - Turks in Kosovo
- Slovenia–Turkey relations
- Turkey at the 1984 Winter Olympics
- Turkey in the Eurovision Song Contest 1990
