= Croatia–Turkey relations =

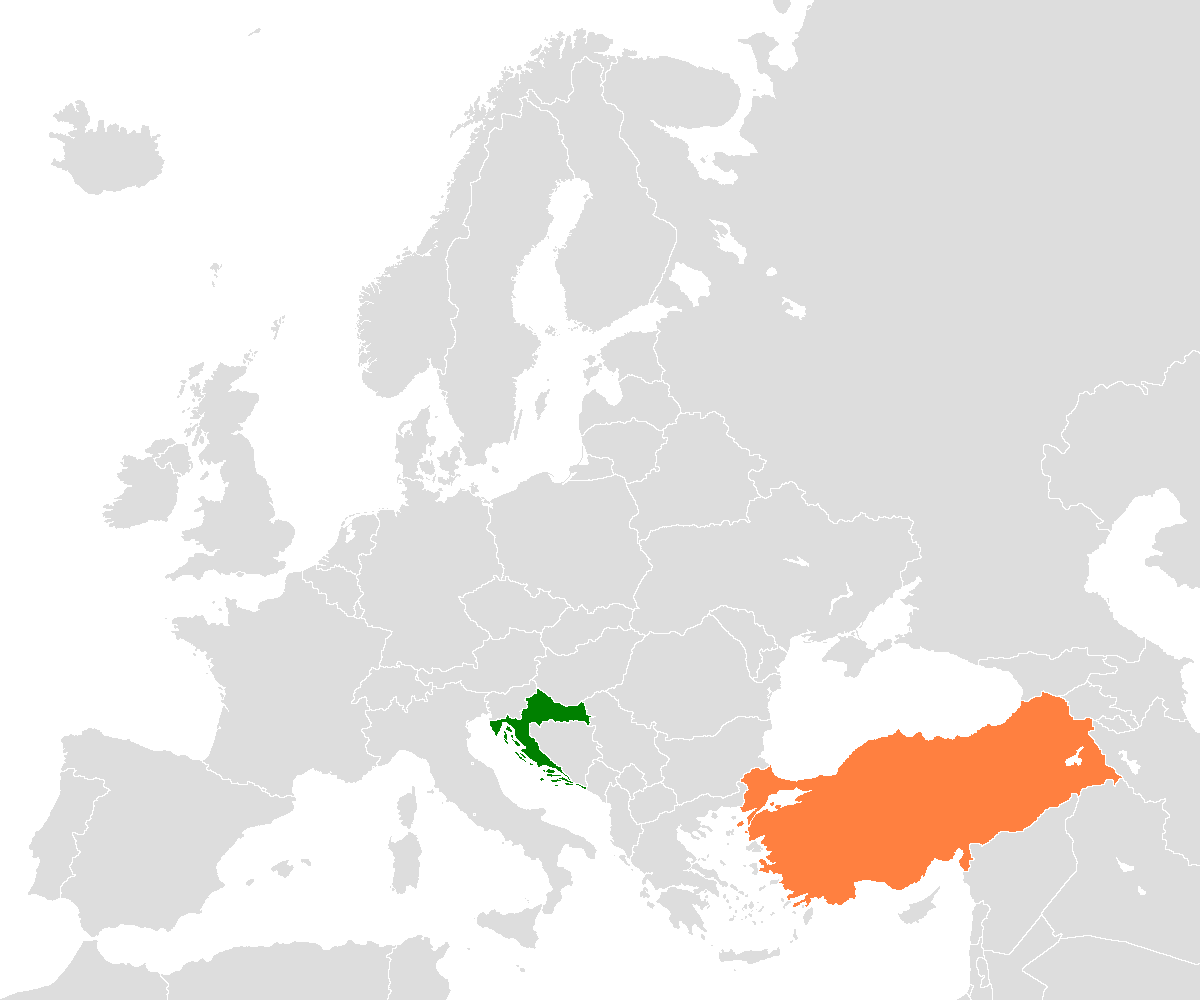

- Croatia: Turkey

Diplomatic mission
- Embassy of Croatia, Ankara: Embassy of Turkey, Zagreb

Croatia and Turkey established diplomatic relations in 1992. Turkey recognized independent Croatia in 1991. Croatia has an embassy in Ankara and a consulate-general in Istanbul and 2 honorary consulates in Antalya and İzmir. Turkey has an embassy in Zagreb. Both countries are full members of Council of Europe and of NATO. Croatia is an EU member and Turkey is an EU candidate. Croatia supports Turkey's accession negotiations to the EU, although negotiations have now been suspended.

== Political relations ==
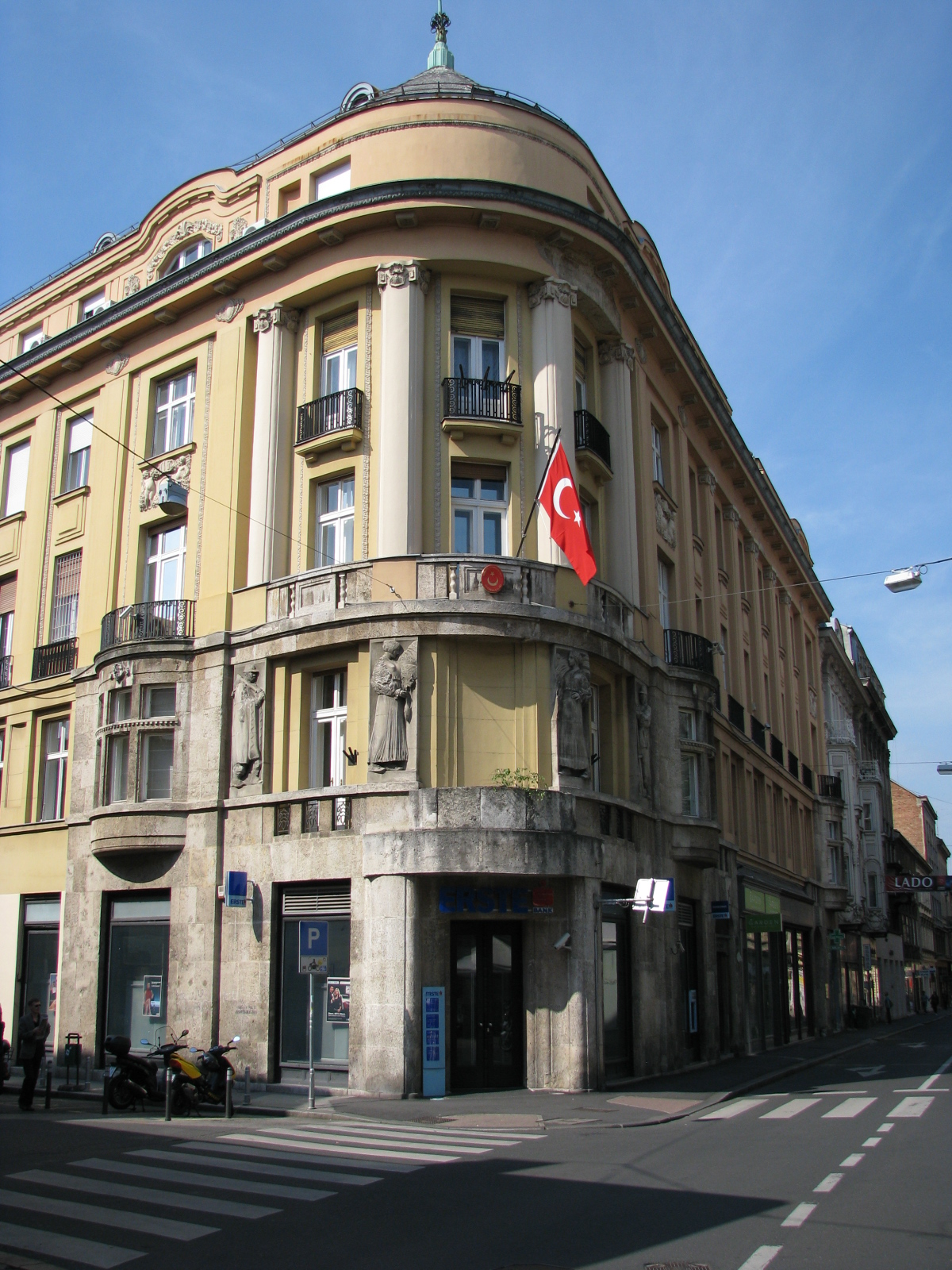
Embassy of Turkey in Zagreb

Croatia and Turkey are both members of the Council of Europe, the North Atlantic Treaty Organization (NATO), the Organization for Security and Co-operation in Europe (OSCE), the World Trade Organization (WTO) and the Union for the Mediterranean. Also both have been EU candidates since 2005 to 2013, when Croatia joined the EU as the 28th member prior to Turkey.

There are approximately 300 Turks in Croatia.

== Economic relations ==
Trade volume between Turkey and Croatia was $1,150 million in 2022.

In 2022, 61,357 Croatian tourists visited Turkey.

== NATO and the EU ==
Croatia joined NATO and the EU in 2009, and 2013, respectively. Turkey supported Croatia's aspiration to join NATO, and ratified Croatia's accession in 2008. Turkey joined NATO in 1952 and is an EU candidate. Both countries began accession negotiations with the EU in 2005. Croatia became a member in 2013, while Turkey's accession negotiations have been officially frozen since 2016. Croatia supports the Accession of Turkey to the EU, although negotiations have now been suspended.

== See also ==
- Foreign relations of Croatia
- Foreign relations of Turkey
- Turkey-EU relations
  - Accession of Turkey to the EU
- NATO-EU relations
- Turks in Croatia
- Turks in Europe
- Turkey–Yugoslavia relations
- Ottoman Monuments of Ilok
