= North Macedonia–Turkey relations =

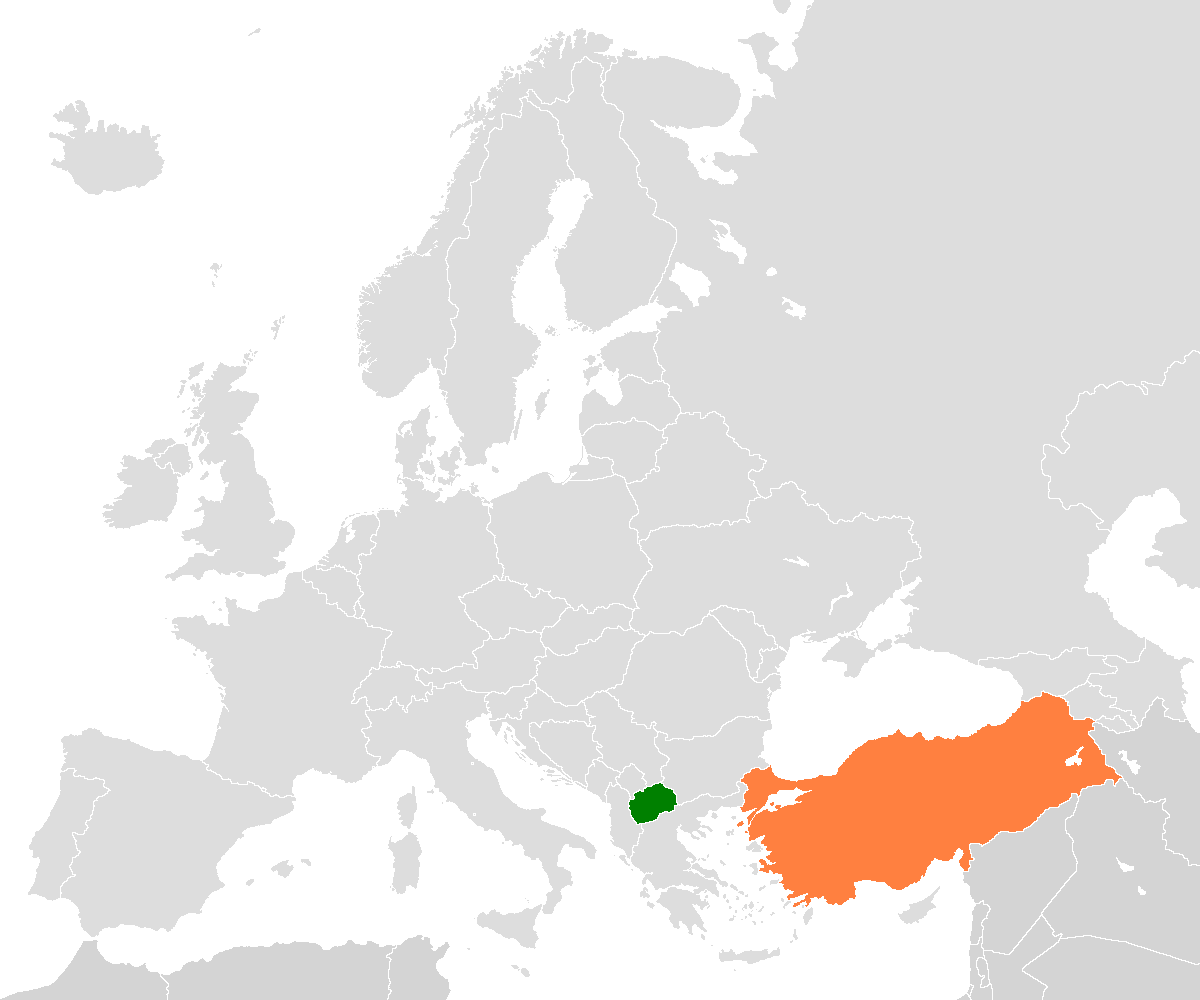

- North Macedonia: Turkey

Diplomatic mission
- North Macedonia Embassy, Ankara: Turkish Embassy, Skopje

North Macedonia–Turkey relations are the bilateral relations between North Macedonia and Turkey. Both countries are full members of the Council of Europe, BSEC and of the NATO. Both countries are candidates for the EU. North Macedonia has an embassy in Ankara and a Consulate General in Istanbul. Turkey has an embassy in Skopje.

== History ==
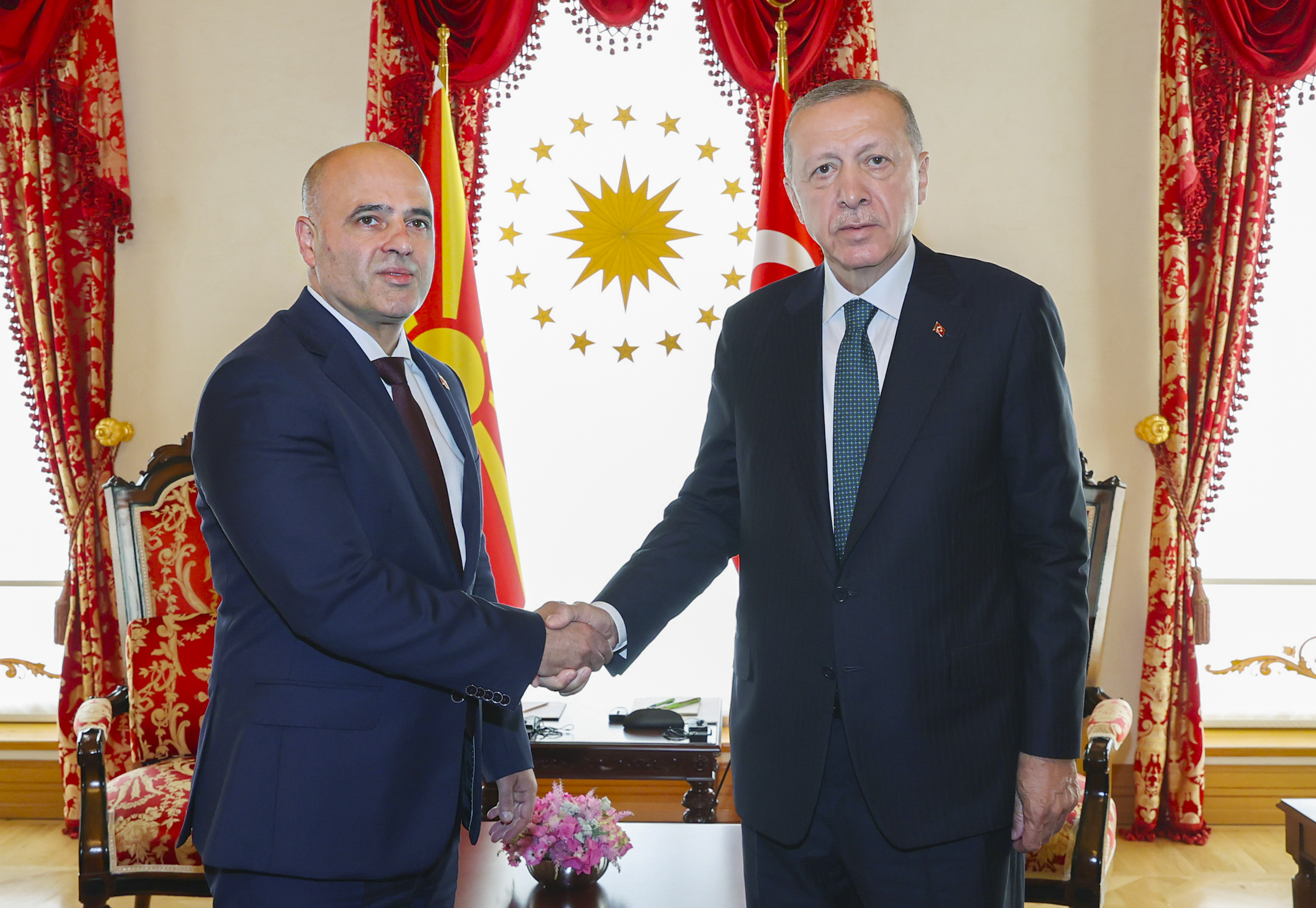
Macedonian Prime Minister Dimitar Kovačevski meeting with Turkish President Recep Tayyip Erdoğan in Istanbul, 13 June 2022

Due to historical, cultural, and human bonds (and geographical proximity), North Macedonia and Turkey have very close and friendly relations. Shortly after North Macedonia declared its independence from the former Yugoslavia in 1991 Turkey recognized North Macedonia's sovereignty as one of the first countries to do so. Bilateral relations were established on 26 August 1992. North Macedonia has an embassy in Ankara and a consulate–general in Istanbul, while Turkey has an embassy in Skopje and a consulate-general in Bitola.

Also, the Turkish language is a co-official language in two municipalities, alongside the Macedonian language. Turkey and North Macedonia also have good economic relations. There are several Turkish companies present in North Macedonia, notably TAV Airports Holding and Şişecam. Both countries aspire to join the EU. North Macedonia is the only Orthodox country in the Balkans not to send a single high-ranking visitor to the Tsitsernakaberd Armenian Genocide Memorial in Yerevan.

In a Gallup polls conducted in 2010, Turkey is viewed as a friendly country with a positive image among a large majority (80 percent) of people in the Republic of North Macedonia. Recognition of the Republic of North Macedonia by Turkey is predicated on North Macedonia upholding the free movement and rights of Albanians in the country. In February 2018, Turkish president Recep Tayyip Erdoğan expressed support of the Republic of North Macedonia's position during negotiations over the dispute, saying that Greece's position is wrong. Turkey supports the North Macedonia's bid to join the EU.

== Citizens from North Macedonia of Turkish origin ==
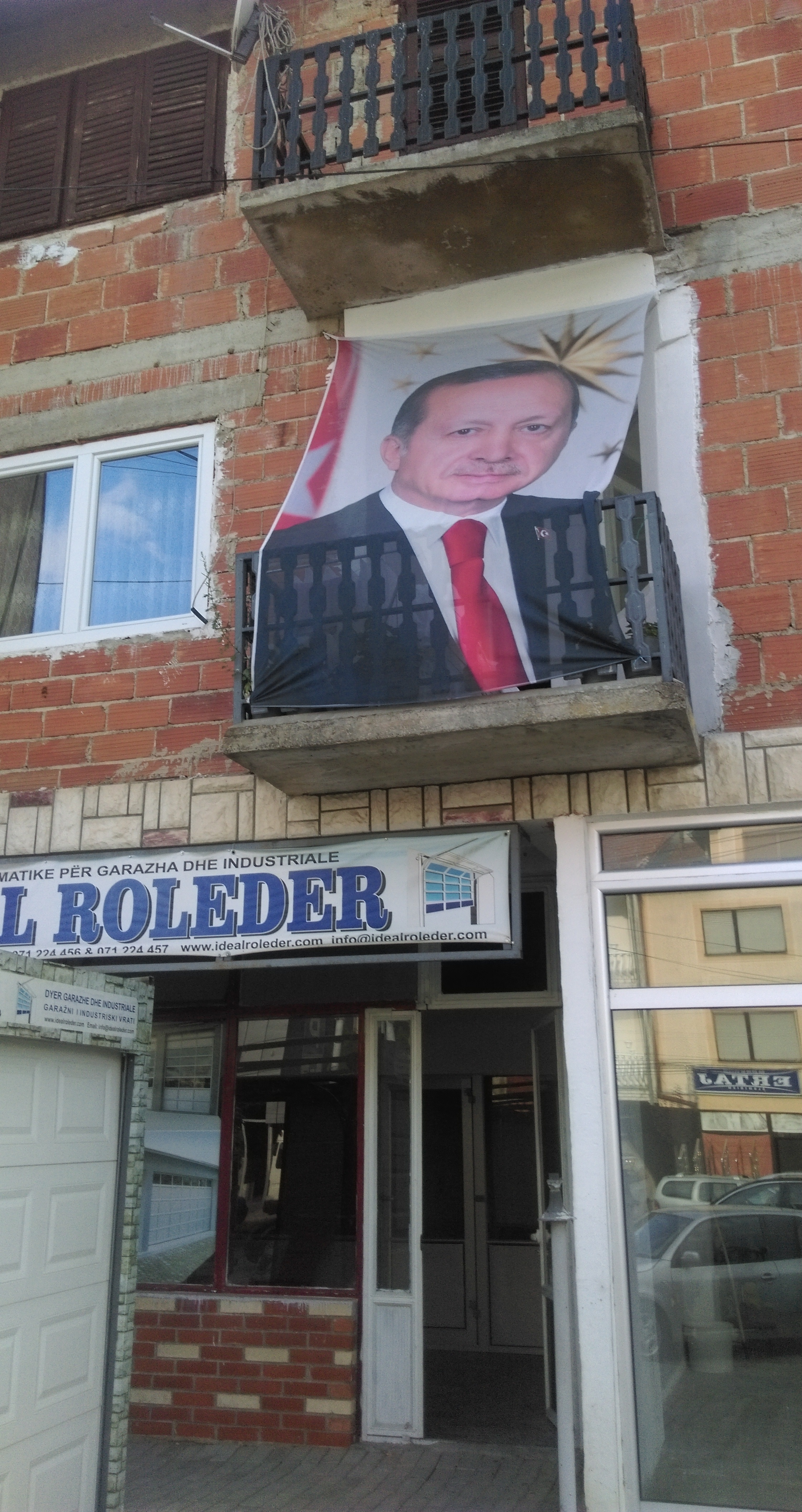
Pro-Erdoğan banner in Gostivar

There are 77,959 citizens declared as Turkish in North Macedonia, forming 3.85% of the population of the country. The Turks of North Macedonia serve as a bridge between the two states, and were part of a program for cooperation in the sphere of culture for the period between 2009 and 2011. According to the program both sides shall intensify the cooperation in different segments of culture and art. Additionally, the countries shall promote each other's culture and open Cultural Information Centres - North Macedonia in Istanbul and Turkey in Skopje. On that occasion, the minister of North Macedonia also announced that the government of North Macedonia decided to renew the house of Mustafa Kemal Atatürk's parents, located in the village of Kodžadžik near Debar. The Turkish authorities allowed archaeologists from North Macedonia to make a copy of the Alexander Sarcophagus that afterwards will be displayed in a museum in North Macedonia.

== See also ==
- Foreign relations of North Macedonia
- Foreign relations of Turkey
- Accession of North Macedonia to the EU
- Accession of Turkey to the EU
- Turkey–Yugoslavia relations
