= Montenegro–Turkey relations =

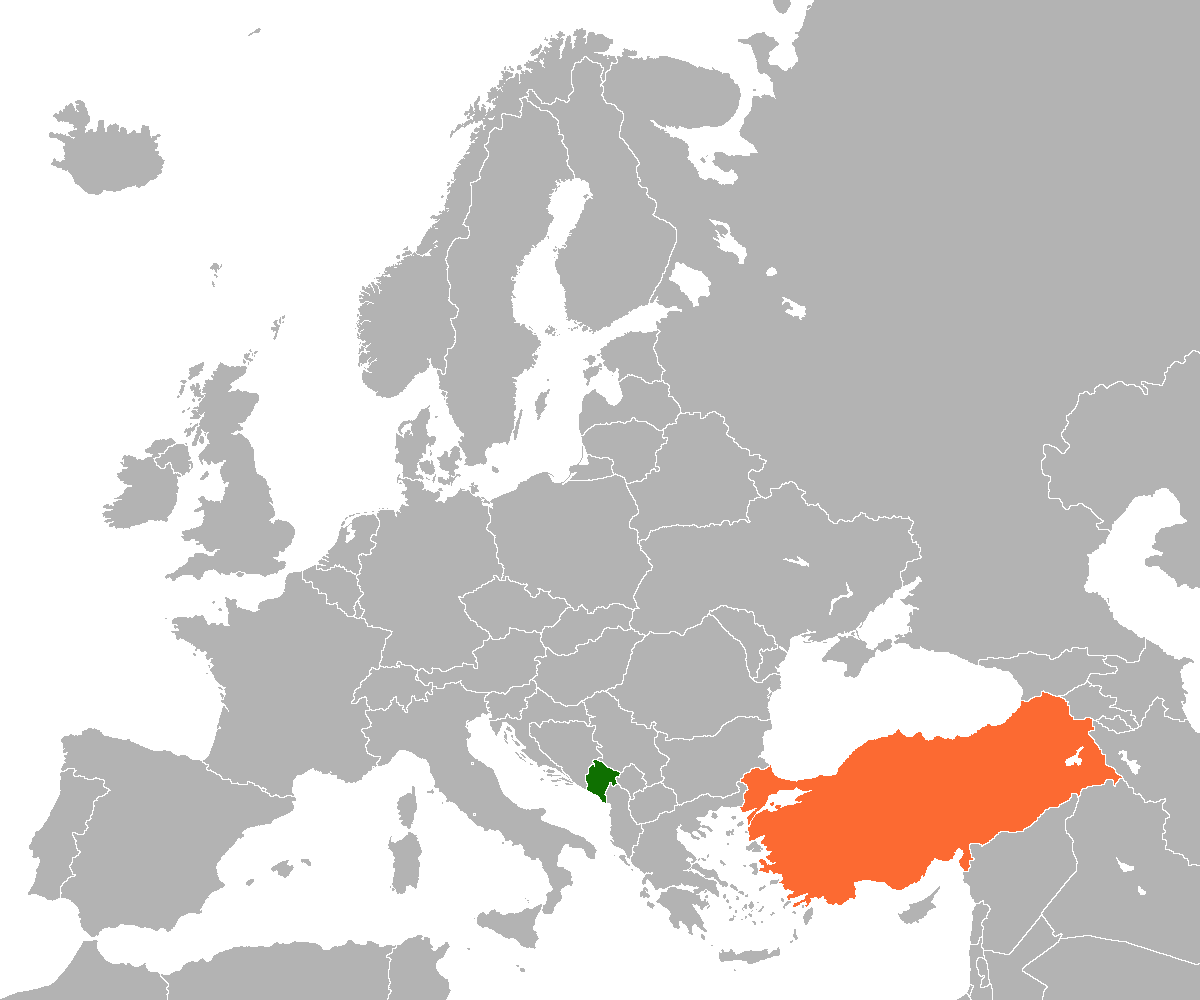

- Montenegro: Turkey

Montenegro–Turkey relations are the bilateral relations between Montenegro and Turkey. Turkey officially recognized Montenegro on June 12, 2006. Diplomatic relations between the two countries were established on July 3, 2006. Both countries are full members of the Union for the Mediterranean, Council of Europe and NATO. Both countries are candidates for the European Union. And Montenegro is with Slovenia is Sectoral dialogue partner countries of BSEC.

Montenegro will temporarily reintroduce visas for Turkish nationals; the country’s prime minister, Milojko Spajic, announced as of October 5, 2025, following an incident in which Turkish migrants were suspected of a knife attack on a Montenegrin citizen in the capital.

== Diplomatic missions ==
- Montenegro has an embassy in Ankara and a consulate-general in Istanbul.
- Turkey has an embassy in Podgorica.

== Economic relations ==
Total trade between the two countries in 2012 amounted to 40.1 million euros, of which imports was 28.4 million euros, and exports 11.7 million. Direct investment from the Republic of Turkey in 2012 amounted to 25 million euros.

Total trade between the two countries in 2011 amounted to 36.8 million euros, of which imports was 25.6 million euros, and exports 11.2 million. Direct investment from the Republic of Turkey in 2011 amounted to 993 281 euros.

In early December 2010, the first meeting of Montenegrin-Turkish Joint Committee, as well as the first business forum of Montenegrin and Turkish businessmen, during the visit of the Turkish Minister of Industry and Trade Nihat Ergun Montenegro.

Total trade between the two countries in 2010 amounted to 33.06 million, of which imports was 28.07 million euros, and exports 4.9 million. Direct investment from the Republic of Turkey in 2010 amounted to EUR 3.3 million.

Total trade between the two countries in 2009 amounted to 22.7 million euros, of which exports were 1.3 million, and imports 21.3 million. Direct investment from the Republic of Turkey in 2009 amounted to 523.2 thousand.

In 2023, Turkey established the Turkish Chamber of Commerce in Podgorica.

== Cultural relations ==
Turkey continues to give scholarships to Montenegrin students within the scope of Government scholarships and Greater Student Project (BOP). With the aim of meeting the future needs of their kins living in Montenegro, with whom they also share the same religion, for well educated Imams, the Turkish Foundation for Religion provides scholarships to Montenegrin students every year.

== Tourism ==
Turkish tourists in Montenegro:

Year	Number of tourists	Total number of nights
2012	13197	24021
2011	18872	91089
2010	6246	11010
2009	2255	5079

After a man in Podgorica was allegedly stabbed by Turkish citizens, visa-free access to Montenegro for Turkish nationals was suspended, causing the number of passengers on flights between the two countries to fall significantly.

== Military cooperation ==
In 2018, Montenegro and Turkey deepened military ties, signing a deal stipulating defense industry cooperation regarding the "production and trade of defence goods and services, maintenance and logistical support". Before 2018, Turkey had not been considered a major military partner for Montenegro.

== See also ==
- Foreign relations of Montenegro
- Foreign relations of Turkey
- Accession of Montenegro to the EU
- Accession of Turkey to the EU
- Turkey–Yugoslavia relations
