= Serbia–Turkey relations =

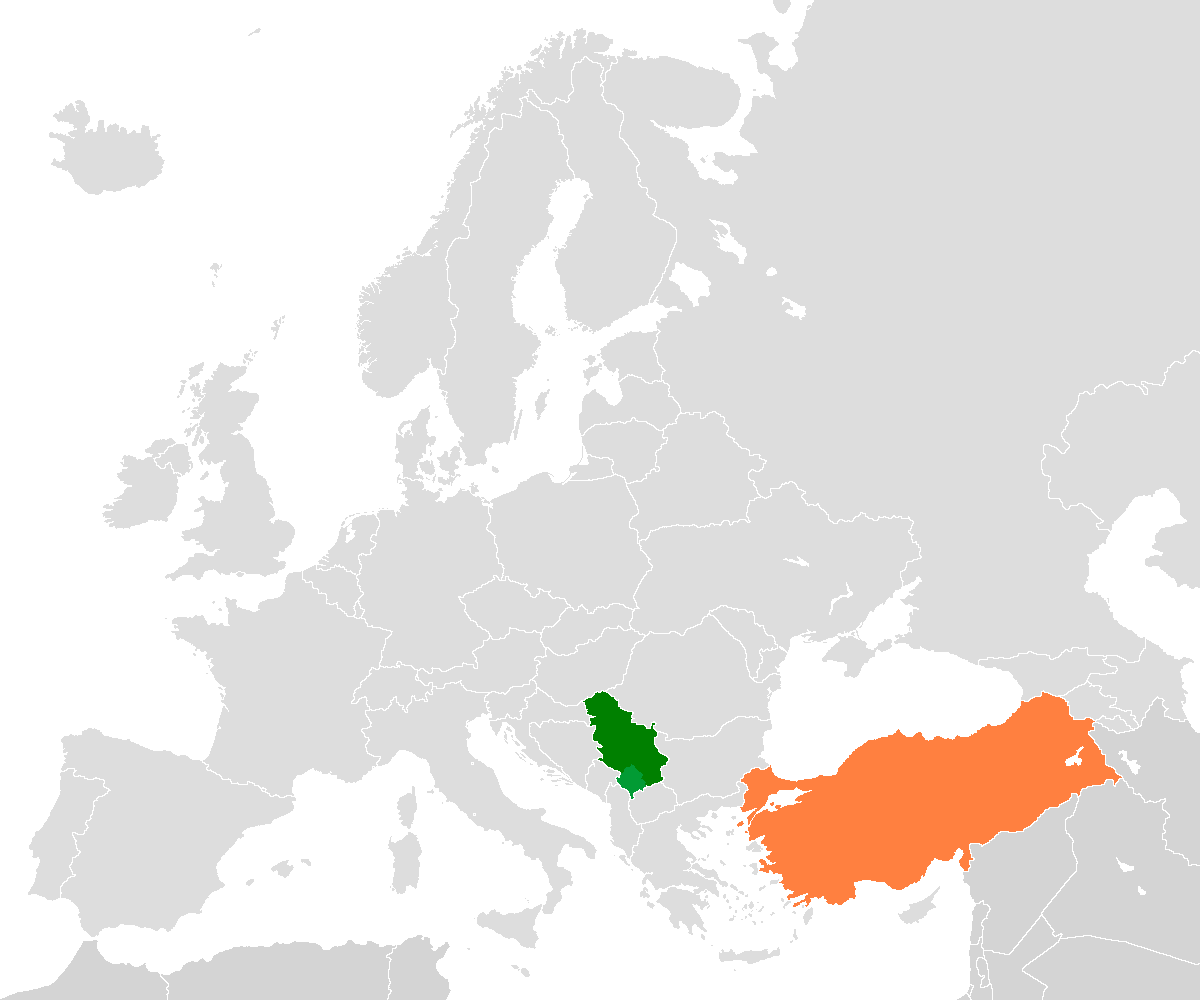
- Serbia: Turkey

Diplomatic mission
- Embassy of Serbia, Ankara: Embassy of Turkey, Belgrade

Serbia and Turkey maintain diplomatic relations established in 1879. From 1918 to 2006, Turkey maintained relations with the Kingdom of Yugoslavia, the Socialist Federal Republic of Yugoslavia (SFRY), and the Federal Republic of Yugoslavia (FRY) (later Serbia and Montenegro), of which Serbia is considered shared (SFRY) or sole (FRY) legal successor.

== History ==
Relations between the two countries date back to the Late Middle Ages. After a series of wars that included the 1371 Battle of Maritsa and the Battle of Kosovo in 1389, the Serbian Despotate became part of the Ottoman Empire in 1459.

Ottoman Serbia remained under direct Turkish rule for three-and-a-half centuries. Many illustrious figures in Ottoman history were of Serbian descent, including Queen Mara Branković, the Grand Viziers Sokollu Mehmed Pasha and Mahmud Pasha Angelović, and the general Omar Pasha.

In 1815, the Serbian Revolution established the autonomous Principality of Serbia, which won independence from the Ottoman Empire de facto in 1867 and de jure in 1878. Diplomatic relations with the Ottoman Empire were established in 1886. Serbia opened consulates in Üsküp (Skopje), Selânik (Salonica), Manastır (Bitola), and Priştine (Pristina) over the next few years. Following the 1894 Istanbul earthquake numerous civil society organisations organized benefit events for the collection of aid for the victims of the catastrophy.

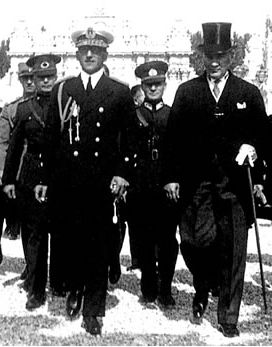
King Alexander of Yugoslavia and Mustafa Kemal Atatürk, 1933

The 1910s was a tumultuous decade in Serbian-Turkish relations. The two countries broke off diplomatic relations with the outbreak of the Balkan Wars in 1912, during which Serbia captured large tracts of Ottoman territory including Kosovo and parts of modern-day North Macedonia. Serbia again declared war on the Ottoman Empire on 2 November 1914 during World War I, although this time the two countries never came into direct conflict with each other.

Diplomatic relations resumed in 1925 between the Kingdom of Yugoslavia and the Republic of Turkey, both being successor states of Serbia and the Ottoman Empire in the aftermath of World War I.

During the Communist Yugoslav period, Serbia (as constituent part of Yugoslavia) and Turkey continued to maintain relations, which for the large part were friendly.

In 1982 two assassins of the Armenian Secret Army for the Liberation of Armenia shot the ambassador of Turkey in Yugoslavia Galip Balkar as revenge for the Armenian genocide. Unarmed citizens of Belgrade who were near the event tried to stop the culprits and chased after them, which resulted in two Serbian civilians wounded and one dead. Ambassador Balkar died two days later in the hospital. The event is commemorated every year by Turkey and Serbia.

With the outbreak of the Yugoslav Wars, Turkey expressed its solidarity with the Muslim-majority regions of Bosnia-Herzegovina and Kosovo, causing some friction with Serbia.

Turkish Defense Minister Vecdi Gönül and Serbian Defense Minister Dragan Šutanovac signed a defence cooperation agreement in Ankara in 2009. Gönül stated that, “Although we do not have a common border, we see Serbia as a neighbour,” and, “Turkey desires to maintain and improve its relations with Serbia the most, among all the other Balkan states.” and, “We are thinking of taking some initiatives in the defense industry together, like co-production in Turkey or Serbia.”

Turkish President Abdullah Gül paid a visit to Serbia in 2009, and became the first Turkish President to visit Serbia since 1986.

In 2013, Serbian foreign ministry condemned a statement by Turkish Prime Minister Recep Tayyip Erdoğan that he made during a visit to Kosovo. Erdoğan said in his speech: "Do not forget that Kosovo is Turkey and Turkey is Kosovo". He also added that he "feels at home" whenever he visits Kosovo. The Serbian foreign ministry responded by saying that Erdoğan's remarks "cannot be received as friendly," and that the town of Prizren, where the speech was made, "is probably the least appropriate place for such statements" due to it being the initial burial place of Serbia's medieval emperor Dušan the Mighty. Various Serbian politicians, including Prime Minister Ivica Dačić and parliament speaker Nebojsa Stefanovic, rejected the Turkish PM's speech. Furthermore, the Turkish ambassador in Belgrade was summoned by the Serbian foreign ministry to demand explanations on October 26, and President Tomislav Nikolic announced Serbia's withdrawal from trilateral talks which included Turkey and Bosnia that same day, demanding Turkey's apology for the "scandal". The statements were also condemned by Heinz-Christian Strache, leader of the Freedom Party of Austria, who believed that Europe should rise against the Turkish PM. "His territorial pretensions in Europe are a step away from the restoration of the Ottoman Empire that Erdoğan wants," Strache said in his statement. However, Turkish Foreign Minister Ahmet Davutoğlu said during an interview on the TRT channel that Erdoğan's words have been misunderstood. "Remarks which have been cut out from the whole speech were taken to grounds we don’t want. We also aim to have good relations with Serbia. Turkey maintains an equal distance to all Balkan countries," Davutoğlu stressed.

Relations between two countries recovered quickly after the 2013 speech with significant increase in number of flights travelers between Belgrade Nikola Tesla Airport and Istanbul airports and entrance of Turkish companies such as Halkbank at Serbian market. In March 2016 in interview for the N 1 television, CNN International's regional broadcast partner and affiliate, Turkish ambassador in Belgrade Mehmet Kemal Bozaj stated that diplomacy of two countries have excellent cooperation regardless of different positions over the question of 2008 Kosovo declaration of independence while also stating that Turkey supports Belgrade–Pristina negotiations. On the margins of 2016 Conference on Global Sustainable Transport in Ashgabat, Turkmenistan Minister of Mining and Energy of Serbia, Aleksandar Antić stated that good relations between Serbia and Turkey contribute to the stability of the entire region. Minister also stated that reconstruction of A4 motorway will have direct positive effect on Turkey since the highway is used by Turkish citizens (especially truck drivers) who are traveling between their country and Central and Western Europe. During his meeting with his Turkish counterpart Mevlüt Çavuşoğlu in Ankara in 2016, Serbian Foreign Minister Ivica Dačić stated that bilateral relations are crucial for the region and that Serbia proved to be Turkish friend during 2016 Turkish coup d'état attempt when Belgrade explicitly at that same first night express opposition to any attempt of violent takeover and express support for the democratically elected government of Turkey. He also invited Turkish President and Mevlüt Çavuşoğlu to visit Belgrade. In 2016 National Assembly of Serbia Deputy Speaker Vladimir Marinković attended the opening of the renovated building of the Embassy of Turkey in Belgrade and on that occasion he stated that political relations between the two countries are very good. He expressed full support of all state institutions of Serbia to Turkey in the process of overcoming post 2016 Turkish coup d'état attempt situation, and that Serbia want to see stable Turkey which is of great importance for the whole region.

In 2022, neither Serbia nor Turkey backed the European Union's and United States' sanctions on Russia for the invasion of Ukraine.

In October 2025, Serbian President Aleksandar Vučić claimed that Turkey did "not want stability in the Western Balkans and dreams of reviving the Ottoman Empire", following its supply of kamikaze drones to Kosovo.

== Economic relations ==
The two countries signed a free trade agreement in 2009. Trade between two countries amounted to $2.4 billion in 2023; Turkish merchandise exports were standing at roughly $1.87 billion while Serbia's exports to Turkey were about $600 million.

Turkish companies present in Serbia include automobile parts manufacturers like Feka Automotive (plant in Ćuprija), Teklas (plant in Vladičin Han) and Doku-san Otomotive (plant in Svilajnac); or textile companies such as Aster Tekxtile (plant in Niš) and Erenli (plant in Leskovac). There is one Turkish bank, Halkbank, operating on Serbian market.

== Resident diplomatic missions ==
- Serbia has an embassy in Ankara and a consulate general in Istanbul.
- Turkey has an embassy in Belgrade and a consulate general in Novi Pazar.
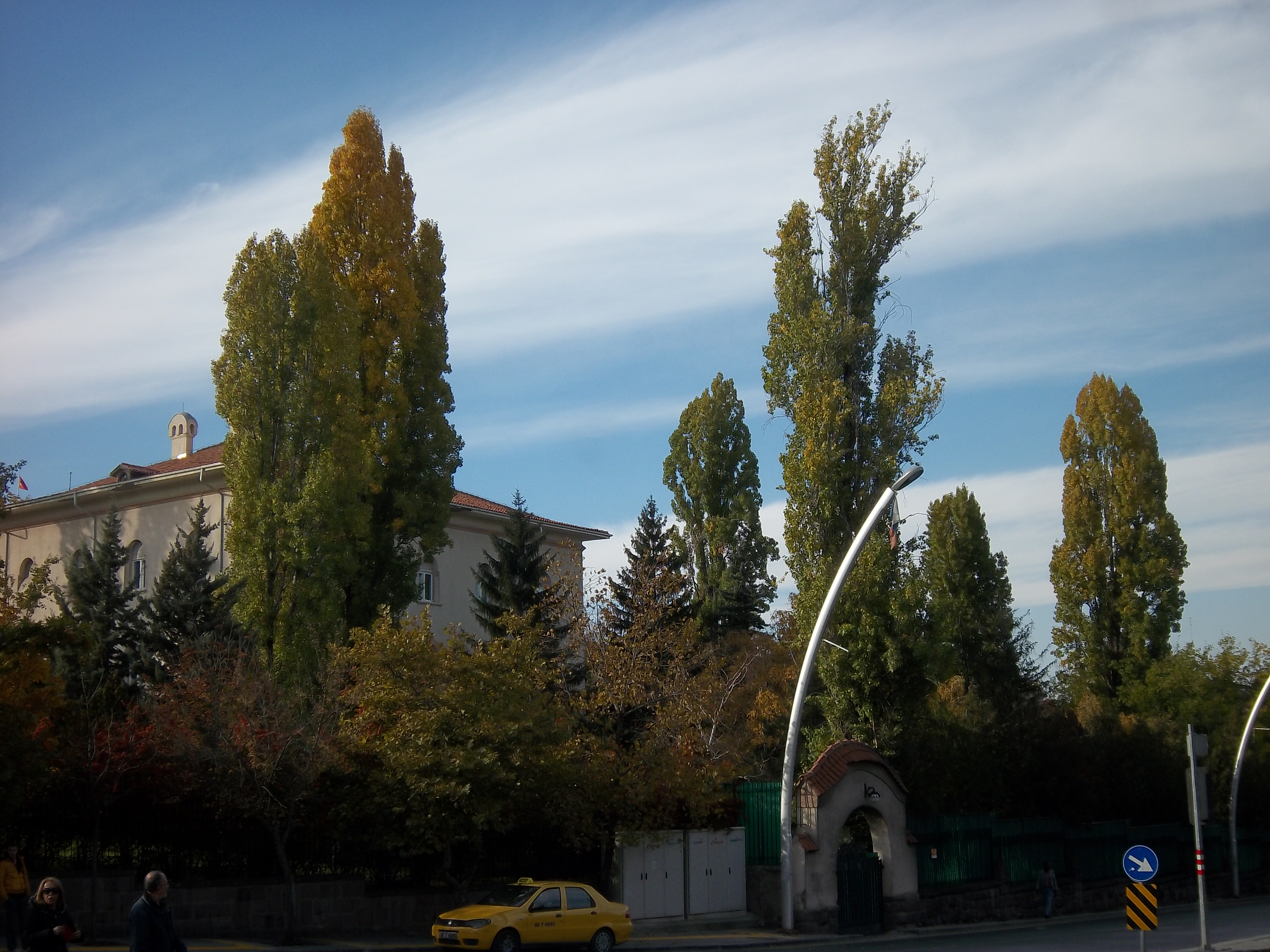
Embassy of Serbia in Ankara

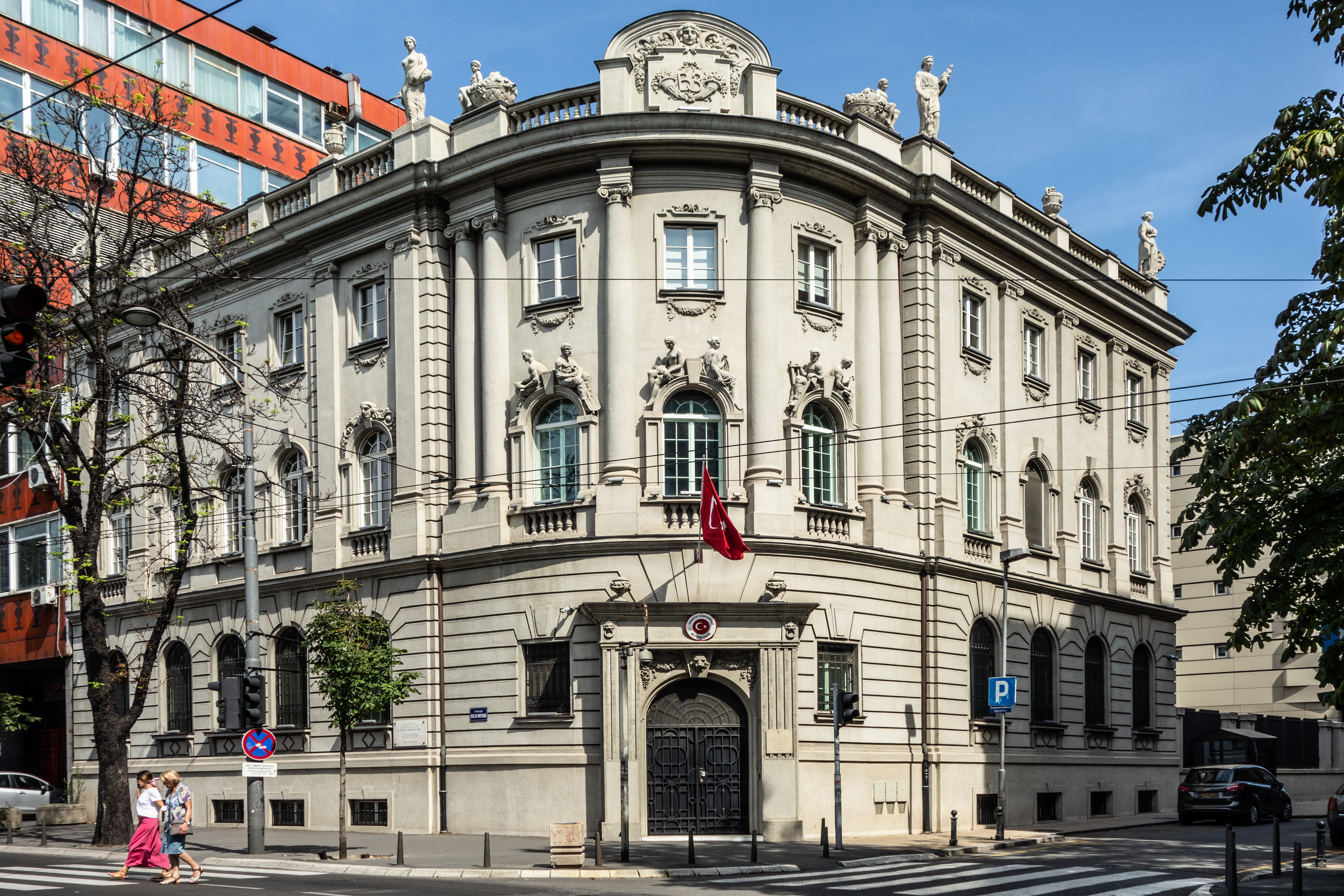
Embassy of Turkey in Belgrade

== See also ==
- Foreign relations of Serbia
- Foreign relations of Turkey
- Serbia–NATO relations
- Turkey–Yugoslavia relations
- Serbs in Turkey
- Turks in Serbia
