= Slovakia–Turkey relations =

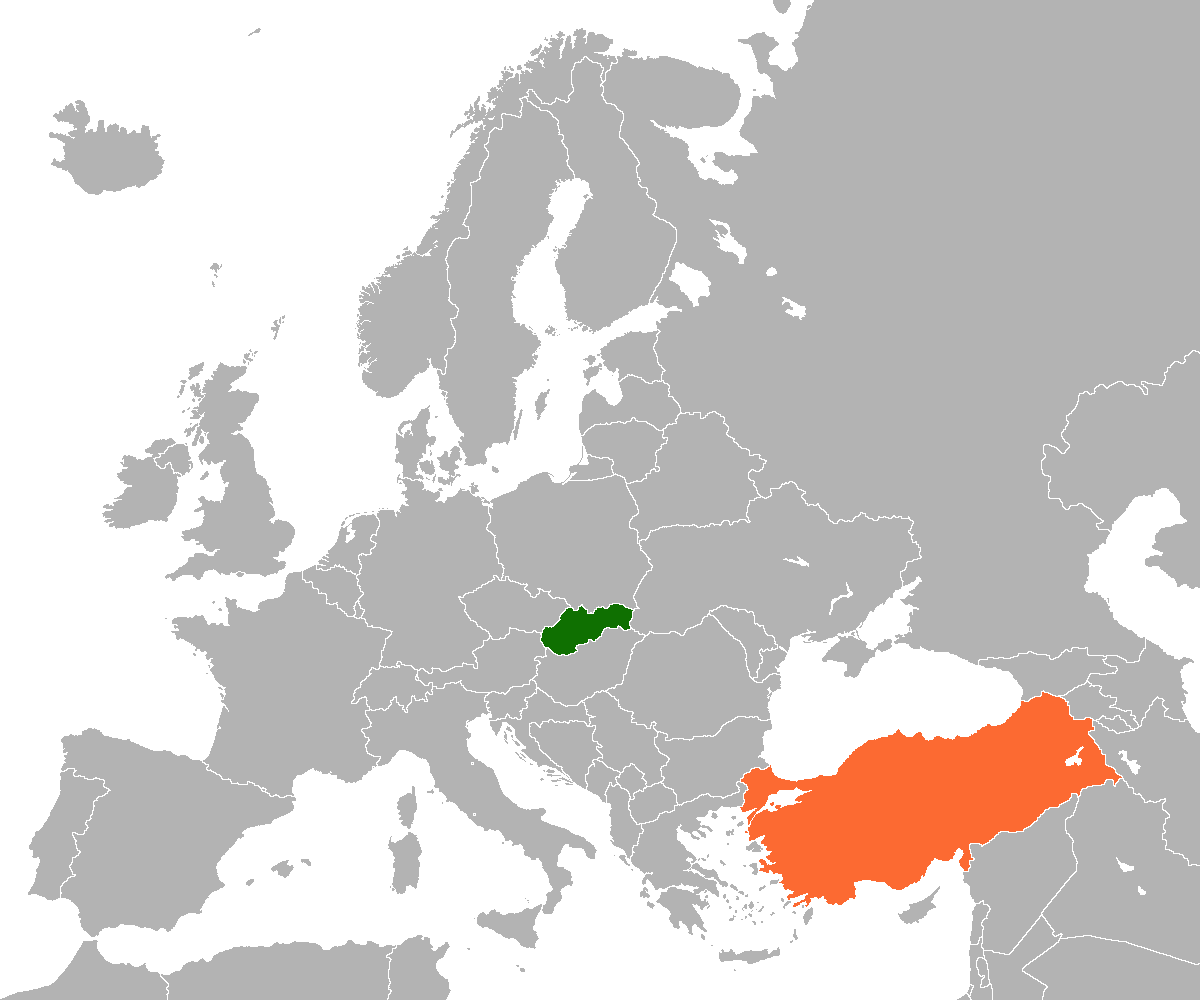
- Slovakia: Turkey

Slovakia–Turkey relations are the bilateral relations between Slovakia and Turkey. In 1993, Turkey was one of the first states to formally recognize both the Slovakia and Czech Republic as separate, and sovereign states after the dissolution. Diplomatic relations and the Turkish Embassy in Bratislava were established on January 4, 1993. Slovakia has an embassy in Ankara and a consulate-general in Istanbul. Before the 1990s split, Turkey held close but also tense relations with Czechoslovakia, specifically during the Cold War due to NATO and the rest of Europe pushing and supporting anti-communist sentiment and approach for its members, such as Turkey, towards Eastern Bloc (Warsaw Pact) countries of which Czechoslovakia was a part of.

== Diplomatic relations ==
Relations between the predecessor Czechoslovakia and Turkey had been excellent until 1948 after World War II, when relations rapidly deteriorated because of disagreements over the compensation for the nationalization of Turkish companies, and the rise of the Cold War.

Trade relations were modest but limited because of Turkey's refusal to participate in a trade agreement until the claims of nationalized businesses were settled.

Relations were more damaged during the Cold War because of Czechoslovakia's alignment within the Warsaw Pact, and its alignment against Israel in the Middle East, which was Turkey's closest ally and partner in that region, specially against the Arab and communist nations.

In 1993, Turkey formally recognized both the Slovakia and Czech Republic as separate, sovereign states. Diplomatic relations and the Turkish Embassy in Bratislava were established on January 4, 1993.

NATO and the EU, both of which Slovakia has been a member of since 2004, are the two main organizations at which Turkey and the Slovak Republic collaborate closely within. Slovakia and Turkey have strong diplomatic ties and cooperate in the military and law enforcement areas since 2004, specially since Slovakia joined the NATO Alliance.

== Economic relations ==
- Bilateral trade volume between Turkey and Slovakia stood at 1.5 billion USD in 2021. Turkish exports being 650 million USD, & Slovak imports standing at just over 850 million USD.
- In 2018, more than 157 thousand Slovak tourists visited Turkey, with an increase of 62 % compared to the previous year in 2017, though tourism during the COVID-19 pandemic that started off in 2019 affected tourism in both countries significantly.

== See also ==
- Foreign relations of Slovakia
- Foreign relations of Turkey
- Turkey-EU relations
  - Accession of Turkey to the EU
- NATO-EU relations
