= Luxembourg–Turkey relations =

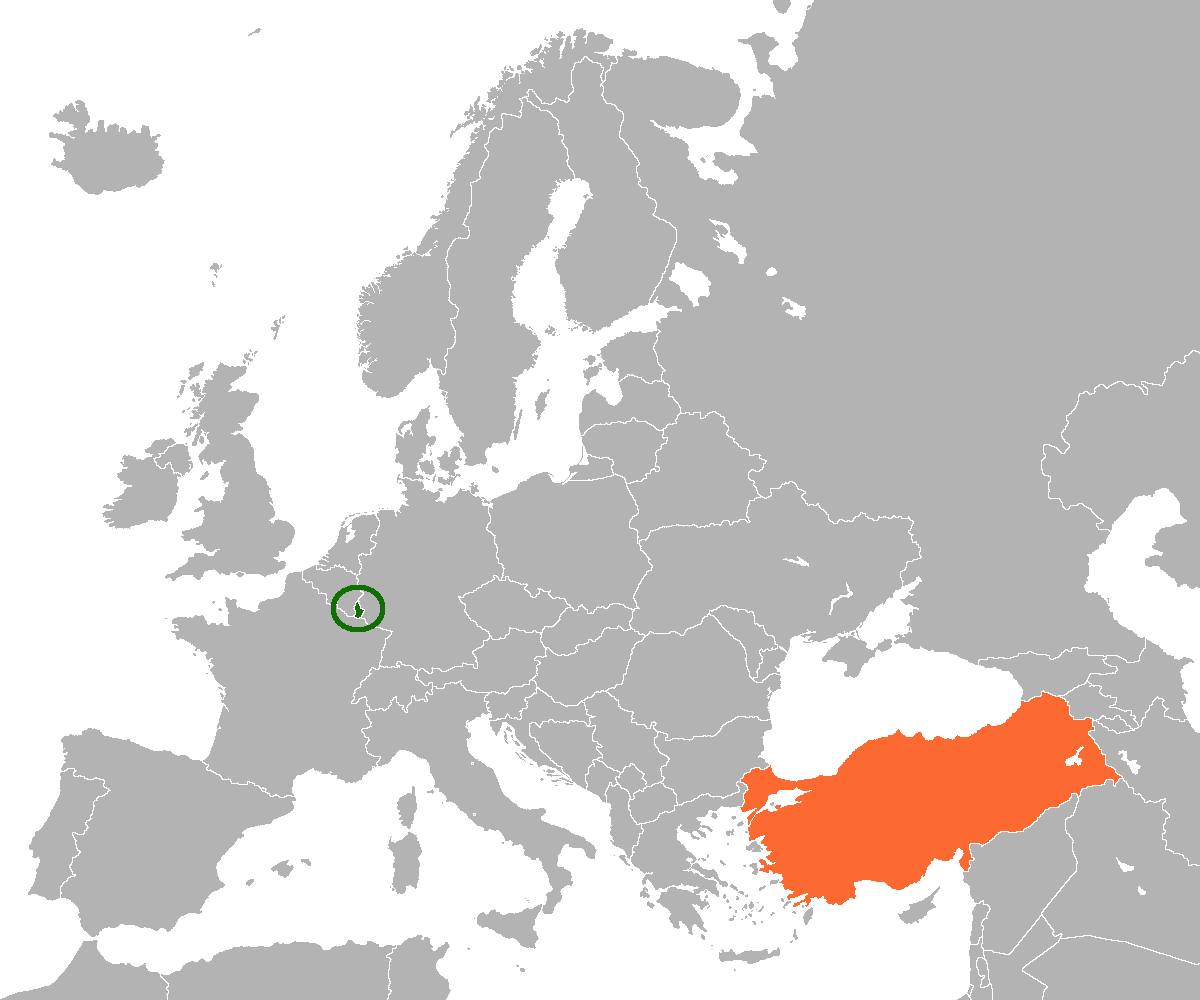

- Luxembourg: Turkey

Luxembourg–Turkey relations are the bilateral relation between Luxembourg and Turkey. Following Luxembourg's independence from the Netherlands, Turkey recognized Luxembourg on 31 May 1867. The Turkish Embassy in Luxembourg was established in 1987. In response, Luxembourg opened its embassy in Ankara on 29 November 2011.

== History ==
Relations became tense in late 1990s following the 1997 Luxembourg Council meeting, where the German Chancellor Helmut Kohl defined the European Union as requiring “civilization,” which a Muslim majority country such as Turkey lacked.

Turks were further shocked by the discussion in which the Greek foreign minister Pangalos gave an unmitigated description of the Turks as “bandits, murderers and rapists.’’

== High level visits ==
Guest	Host	Place of visit	Date of visit
(Turkey) Prime Minister Recep Tayyip Erdoğan	(Luxembourg) Prime Minister Jean-Claude Juncker	Grand Ducal Palace, Luxembourg City	November 2004
(Luxembourg) Prime Minister Jean-Claude Juncker	(Turkey) Prime Minister Recep Tayyip Erdoğan	Çankaya Köşkü, Ankara	8–9 November 2011
(Luxembourg) Grand Duke Henri	(Turkey) President Abdullah Gül	Çankaya Köşkü, Ankara	18–22 November 2013

== Economic relations ==
- Trade volume between the two countries was US$160 million in 2017 (Turkish exports/imports: 36/124 million USD).
- There are direct flights from Istanbul to Luxembourg City twice daily.
- 2,764 tourists from Luxembourg visited Turkey in 2015.

== See also ==
- Foreign relations of Luxembourg
- Foreign relations of Turkey
- Turkey-EU relations
  - Accession of Turkey to the EU
- NATO-EU relations
