= Turkey–European Union relations =

Relations with the European Union and Turkey

European Union–Turkey relations
- European Union: Turkey

Diplomatic mission
- Delegation of the European Union to Turkey, Ankara: Turkish permanent mission to the European Union, Brussels

Relations between the European Union (EU) and Turkey were established in 1959, and the institutional framework was formalized with the 1963 Ankara Agreement. Although not a member state of the European Union, Turkey is one of the EU's main partners and both are members of the European Union–Turkey Customs Union. Turkey borders two EU member states: Bulgaria and Greece. While Turkey officially has diplomatic relations with 26 EU member states, it does not have diplomatic relations with 1 EU member state (Cyprus).

Turkey has been an applicant to accede to the EU since 1987. In 1999, Turkey gained candidate status to become a member of the EU. Accession negotiations were started in 2005, but have been stalled since 2016. EU–Turkey relations became strained following the 2016 coup attempt. Relations have remained strained since 2016. The EU has criticised Turkey for human rights violations and deficits in rule of law. In 2017, EU officials expressed the view that planned Turkish policies violate the Copenhagen criteria of eligibility for EU membership. On 26 June 2018, the EU's General Affairs Council noted that "Turkey has been moving further away from the European Union. Turkey's accession negotiations have therefore effectively come to a standstill and no further chapters can be considered for opening or closing and no further work towards the modernisation of the EU-Turkey Customs Union is foreseen." In 2017, Turkey experienced a diplomatic crisis with the Netherlands, an EU member state. Then, in 2022, it delayed the NATO membership applications of two EU member states, Finland and Sweden.

== Background ==
After the Ottoman Empire's collapse following World War I, Turkish revolutionaries led by Mustafa Kemal Atatürk emerged victorious in the Turkish War of Independence, establishing the modern Turkish Republic as it exists today. Atatürk, President of Turkey, implemented a series of reforms, including secularisation and industrialisation, intended to "Europeanise" or Westernise the country. During World War II, Turkey remained neutral until February 1945, when it joined the Allies. The country took part in the Marshall Plan of 1947, became a member of the Council of Europe in 1950, and a member of NATO in 1952. During the Cold War, Turkey allied itself with the United States and Western Europe. The Turkish expert Meltem Ahıska outlines the Turkish position vis-à-vis Europe, explaining how "Europe has been an object of desire as well as a source of frustration for Turkish national identity in a long and strained history".

Foreign relations policies of the Republic of Turkey have – based on the Western-inspired reforms of Mustafa Kemal Atatürk – placed heavy emphasis on Turkey's relationship with the Western world, especially in relation to the United States, the North Atlantic Treaty Organization and the European Union. The post-Cold War period has seen a diversification of relations, with Turkey seeking to strengthen its regional presence in the Balkans, the Middle East and the Caucasus, as well as its historical goal of EU membership. Under the AKP government, Turkey's influence has grown in the Middle East based on the strategic depth doctrine, also called Neo-Ottomanism. Debate on Turkey in the West is sharply divided between those who see Turkey moving away from the West toward a more Middle Eastern and Islamic orientation and those who see Ankara's improved ties with its Islamic neighbors as a natural progression toward balance and diversification.

== History of relations ==
Turkey was one of the first countries, in 1959, to seek close cooperation with the young European Economic Community (EEC). This cooperation was realised in the framework of an association agreement, known as the Ankara Agreement, which was signed on 12 September 1963. An important element in this plan was establishing a customs union so that Turkey could trade goods and agricultural products with EEC countries without restrictions. The main aim of the Ankara agreement was to achieve "continuous improvement in living conditions in Turkey and in the European Economic Community through accelerated economic progress and the harmonious expansion of trade, and to reduce the disparity between the Turkish economy and … the Community".

=== Accession of Turkey to the European Union ===
Enlargement is one of the EU's most powerful policy tools. It is a carefully managed process which helps the transformation of the countries involved, extending peace, stability, prosperity, democracy, human rights and the rule of law across Europe. The European Union enlargement process took a bold step on 3 October 2005 when accession negotiations were opened with Croatia (an EU member since 2013) and Turkey. After years of preparation the two candidates formally opened the next stage of the accession process. The negotiations relate to the adoption and implementation of the EU body of law, known as the acquis. The acquis is approximately 130,000 pages of legal documents grouped into 35 chapters and forms the rules by which Member States of the EU should adhere. As a candidate country, Turkey needs to adapt a considerable part of its national legislation in line with EU law. This means fundamental changes for society that will affect almost all sectors of the country, from the environment to the judiciary, from transport to agriculture, and across all sections of the population. However, the candidate country does not 'negotiate' on the acquis communautaire itself as these 'rules' must be fully adopted by the candidate country. The negotiation aspect is on the conditions for harmonisation and implementation of the acquis, that is, how the rules are going to be applied and when. It is for this reason that accession negotiations are not considered to be negotiations in the classical sense. In order to become a Member State, the candidate country must bring its institutions, management capacity and administrative and judicial systems up to EU standards, both at national and regional level. This allows them to implement the acquis effectively upon accession and, where necessary, to be able to implement it effectively in good time before accession. This requires a well-functioning and stable public administration built on an efficient and impartial civil service, and an independent and efficient judicial system. EU–Turkey relations have deteriorated following President Erdoğan's crackdown on supporters of the 2016 Turkish coup d'état attempt. While Erdoğan stated that he approved the reintroduction of the death penalty to punish those involved in the coup, the EU announced that it strongly condemned the coup attempt and would officially end accession negotiations with Turkey if the death penalty was reintroduced. On 25 July 2016, President of the European Commission Jean-Claude Juncker said that Turkey was not in a position to become a member of the European Union in the near future and that accession negotiations between the EU and Turkey would be stopped immediately if the death penalty was brought back. On 24 November 2016 the European Parliament voted to suspend accession negotiations with Turkey over human rights and rule of law concerns; however, this decision was non-binding. On 13 December, the European Council (comprising the heads of state or government of the member states) resolved that it would open no new areas in Turkey's membership talks in the "prevailing circumstances", as Turkey's path toward autocratic rule makes progress on EU accession impossible.

In 2016, EU member Austria opposed Turkey's EU membership. In March 2018, then-Austrian Chancellor Sebastian Kurz opposed Turkey's EU accession talks and urged it to halt membership talks.

In 2017, EU officials expressed that planned Turkish policies violate the Copenhagen criteria of eligibility for an EU membership. On 25 April 2017, the Parliamentary Assembly of the Council of Europe (PACE) adopted a resolution placing Turkey back under monitoring, with 113 votes in favor and 45 against. This vote is widely understood to have dealt a major blow to Turkey's eventual EU membership prospects, as exiting this process had been a precondition for EU accession negotiations in 2004. On 6 July 2017, the European Parliament unanimously accepted the call for the suspension of full membership negotiations between the EU and Turkey. On 26 June 2018, the EU's General Affairs Council stated that "the Council notes that Turkey has been moving further away from the European Union. Turkey's accession negotiations have therefore effectively come to a standstill and no further chapters can be considered for opening or closing and no further work towards the modernisation of the EU-Turkey Customs Union is foreseen." The Council added that it is "especially concerned about the continuing and deeply worrying backsliding on the rule of law and on fundamental rights including the freedom of expression." On 13 March 2019, the European Parliament unanimously accepted the call for a halt to the full membership negotiations between the EU and Turkey. On 19 May 2021, the European Parliament unanimously accepted the call for the suspension of accession negotiations between the EU and Turkey. However, in July 2023, Erdoğan brought up Turkey's accession to EU membership in the context of Sweden's application for NATO membership. On 18 July 2023, the EU decided not to restart full membership negotiations with Turkey. According to Dagens Nyheter's data, in September 2023, 60% of Swedes said that Sweden opposes Turkey's EU membership and will not support the membership process, while 7% said that Sweden does not oppose Turkey's EU membership and will support the membership process. According to the annual public opinion poll conducted in Turkey in 2025, 51% of citizens have a positive view of the EU (21% very positive, 30% quite positive), and trust in the EU is 58%. Furthermore, the poll revealed that if a referendum on EU membership were held, 58% of citizens would vote for Turkey's membership, and 66% believe that EU membership would bring more advantages than disadvantages.

Key milestones

- 1963: The association agreement is signed between Turkey and the EEC.
- 1987: Turkey submits application for full membership.
- 1993: The EU and Turkey Customs Union negotiations start.
- 1996: The Customs Union between Turkey and the EU takes effect.
- 1999: At the Helsinki Summit, the European Council gives Turkey the status of candidate country for EU membership, following the commission's recommendation in its second Regular Report on Turkey.
- 2001: The European Council adopts the EU-Turkey Accession Partnership, providing a road map for Turkey's EU accession process. The Turkish Government adopts the NPAA, the National Programme for the Adoption of the Acquis, reflecting the Accession Partnership. At the Copenhagen Summit, the European Council decides to significantly increase EU financial support through what is now called the "pre-accession instrument" (IPA).
- 2002: Turkey abolished the death penalty as a step towards EU membership accession negotiations.
- 2004: The European Council decides to open accession negotiations with Turkey.
- 2005: Accession negotiations open.
- 2016: The European Parliament votes to suspend accession negotiations with Turkey over human rights and rule of law concerns.
- 2017: The EU parliament unanimously accepted the call for the suspension of full membership negotiations between the EU and Turkey.
- 2018: The EU's General Affairs Council states that "Turkey has been moving further away from the European Union. Turkey's accession negotiations have therefore effectively come to a standstill and no further chapters can be considered for opening or closing and no further work towards the modernisation of the EU-Turkey Customs Union is foreseen."
- 2019: The European Parliament unanimously accepted the call for the suspension of full membership negotiations between the EU and Turkey.
- 2021: The European Parliament unanimously accepted the call for the suspension of accession negotiations between the EU and Turkey.

=== Institutional cooperation ===
The association agreement that Turkey has with the EU serves as the basis for implementation of the accession process. Several institutions have been set up to ensure political dialogue and cooperation throughout the membership preparation process.

Association Council

The council is made up of representatives of the Turkish government, the European Council and the European Commission. It is instrumental in shaping and orienting Turkey-EU relations. Its aim is to implement the association agreement in political, economic and commercial issues. The Association Council meets twice a year at ministerial level. The Council takes decisions unanimously. Turkey and the EU side have one vote each.

Association Committee

The Association Committee brings together experts from EU and Turkey to examine Association related technical issues and to prepare the agenda of the Association Council. The negotiations chapters are discussed in eight subcommittees organised as follows:

1. Agriculture and Fisheries Committee
2. Internal Market and Competition Committee
3. Trade, Industry and ECSC Products Committee
4. Economic and Monetary Issues Committee
5. Innovation Committee
6. Transport, Environment and Energy Committee
7. Regional Development, Employment and Social Policy Committee
8. Customs, Taxation, Drug Trafficking and Money Laundering Committee

Joint Parliamentary Commission

The Joint Parliamentary Commission is the control body of the Turkey-EU association. Its task is to analyze the annual activity reports submitted to it by the Association Council and to make recommendations on EU-Turkey Association related issues.

It consists of 18 members selected from the Turkish Grand National Assembly and the European Parliament, who meet twice a year.

Customs Union Joint Committee

The main task of the Customs Union Joint Committee (CUJC) is to establish a consultative procedure in order to ensure legislative harmony foreseen in the fields directly related to the functioning of the customs union between Turkey and the EU. The CUJC makes recommendations to the Association Council. It is planned to meet regularly once a month.

Joint Consultative Committee

The Joint Consultative Committee (JCC) was formed on 16 November 1995 in accordance with Article 25 of the Ankara Agreement. The Committee aims to promote dialogue and cooperation between the economic and social interest groups in the European Community and Turkey and to facilitate the institutionalisation of the partners of that dialogue in Turkey. The Joint Consultative Committee has a mixed, cooperative and two-winged structure, with EU and Turkey wings. It has 36 members in total, composed of 18 Turkish and 18 EU representatives and it has two elected co-chairmen, one from the Turkish side and the other from the EU side.

EU-related administrative bodies in Turkish administration

The Secretariat General for European Union Affairs was established in July 2000 to ensure internal coordination and harmony in the preparation of Turkey for EU membership.

The Under secretariat of Foreign Trade EU Executive Board was established to ensure the direction, follow-up and finalisation of work carried out within the scope of the Customs Union and the aim of integration.

=== Timeline of notable positions and statements ===
- In the 1920s, Mustafa Kemal Atatürk, the founder of the Republic of Turkey, said that "there are different cultures, but only one civilisation," making it clear that he was not referring to Islamic civilisation: "We Turks have always gone from east to west."
- (France) / In November 2002, then-French President and then-President of the European Convention Valéry Giscard d'Estaing said in an interview with the French newspaper Le Monde, "Turkey is an important country close to Europe, but it is not a European country. It is not a European country because its capital is not in Europe and 95% of its population lives outside Europe." he said. Estaing continued as follows: "The Union should now focus on internal financial problems and the construction of European harmony instead of expansion. Those who most support Turkey joining the Union are actually opponents of the European Union. In fact, the majority of European Council members are against Turkey joining, but the Turks were never told this. Turkey joining the European Union would mean the end of the European Union."
- (France) In January 2007, then-French President Nicolas Sarkozy stated that "Turkey has no place inside the European Union." Sarkozy continued, "I want to say that Europe must give itself borders, that not all countries have a vocation to become members of Europe, beginning with Turkey which has no place inside the European Union."
- (European Union) In July 2007, European Commission President José Manuel Barroso said that Turkey is not ready to join the EU "tomorrow nor the day after tomorrow", but its membership negotiations should continue. He also called on France and other member states to honour the decision to continue accession talks, describing it as a matter of credibility for the Union.
- In December 2010, then-President of the European Council Herman Van Rompuy he said "Turkish reform efforts have delivered impressive results." He continued "Turkey plays an ever more active role in its neighbourhood. Turkey is also a full-standing member of the G-20, just like five EU countries and the EU itself. In my view, even before an outcome of the negotiations, the European Union should develop a close partnership with the Turkish Republic."
- (Germany) In September 2011, German Chancellor Angela Merkel has said on the occasion of the visit of the Turkish president Abdullah Gül: "We don't want the full membership of Turkey. But we don't want to lose Turkey as an important country", referring to her idea of a strategic partnership.
- In June 2013, Turkey's Undersecretary of the Ministry of EU Affairs Haluk Ilıcak said, "The process means more than the accession. Once the necessary levels are achieved, Turkey is big enough to continue its development without the accession. Our aim is to achieve a smooth accession process."
- During the 2014 European Parliament election campaign, presidential candidates Jean-Claude Juncker (EEP) and Martin Schulz (S&D) promised that Turkey would never join the European Union while either one of them were president, reasoning that Turkey had turned its back on European democratic values. Juncker won the election and became the new president of the EU as of 1 November 2014. He later reaffirmed his stance: "As regards Turkey, the country is clearly far away from EU membership. A government that blocks Twitter is certainly not ready for accession."
- (European Union) In 2016, the EU made a deal with Turkey and decided to give Turkey €6 billion ($7.3 billion) the next period in order to help the country with the refugees and migrants living there (the contract ended in December 2020).
- In March 2016, Turkish President Recep Tayyip Erdoğan said that democracy and freedom were "phrases" which had "absolutely no value" in Turkey, after calling for journalists, lawyers and politicians to be prosecuted as terrorists.
- (United Kingdom) In May 2016, then-British Prime Minister David Cameron said that "it is not remotely on the cards that Turkey is going to join the EU any time soon. They applied in 1987. At the current rate of progress they will probably get round to joining in about the year 3000 according to the latest forecasts."
- In July 2016, European Union High Representative for Foreign Affairs and Security Policy Federica Mogherini announced that EU membership negotiations would be terminated if the death penalty was reinstated in Turkey.
- (Austria) In August 2016, then-Austrian Chancellor Christian Kern called for the suspension of full membership negotiations between the EU and Turkey.
- On 4 November 2016, the European Union expressed concern over Turkey's arrest of the co-chairs of the Peoples' Democratic Party (HDP), Selahattin Demirtaş and Figen Yüksekdağ, and other HDP politicians, and called on Turkey to immediately release Demirtaş, Yüksekdağ, and the other politicians.
- (Turkey) In March 2017, in a speech given to supporters in the western Turkish city of Sakarya, Turkish President Recep Tayyip Erdoğan said, "my dear brothers, a battle has started between the cross and the crescent", after insulting European government politicians as "Nazis" in the weeks before. The same month, he threatened that Europeans would "not be able to walk safely on the streets" if they continued to ban Turkish ministers from addressing rallies in Europe. European politicians rejected Erdoğan's comments.
- In March 2017, Frank-Walter Steinmeier in his inaugural speech as President of Germany said that "the way we look (at Turkey) is characterized by worry, that everything that has been built up over years and decades is collapsing."
- (European Union) "Everybody's clear that, currently at least, Turkey is moving away from a European perspective," European Commissioner Johannes Hahn, who oversees EU membership bids, said in May 2017. "The focus of our relationship has to be something else. We have to see what could be done in the future, to see if we can restart some kind of cooperation."
- (Germany) In a TV debate in September 2017, then-German chancellor Angela Merkel and her challenger Martin Schulz both said that they would seek an end to Turkey's membership talks with the European Union.
- (Finland) In September 2017, Finnish foreign minister Timo Soini announced that they were in favor of not stopping Turkey's membership negotiations with the European Union.
- (Austria) In December 2017, then-Austrian Chancellor Sebastian Kurz announced that they were in favor of stopping Turkey's accession negotiations with the European Union.
- (European Union) The European Commission's long-term budget proposal for the 2021–2027 period released in May 2018 included pre-accession funding for a Western Balkan Strategy for further enlargement, but omitted Turkey.
- (Austria) On 17 July 2018, then-Austrian Chancellor Sebastian Kurz, in an interview with the Greek newspaper Kathimerini, called for ending full membership negotiations between the EU and Turkey and developing relations instead of full membership negotiations. Kurz said: "I have been speaking out for years about developing an honest relationship with Turkey." Kurz continued as follows: "EU membership negotiations with Turkey should be stopped immediately. Turkey has continuously moved away from Europe and its values over the last few years. We should also focus on exploring other forms of cooperation between our neighbors the EU and Turkey."
- In December 2020, Turkish President Recep Tayyip Erdoğan said that the EU has constantly applied sanctions since 1963 and that Turkey is not concerned about sanctions. He added that the EU is not honest with Turkey. These remarks came after the possibility of EU sanction due to Turkey's behavior towards Greece and Cyprus, both EU members.
- (European Union) In December 2020, the EU extended support to Turkey for refugees and migrants until 2022. It will give an extra €485 million to Turkey.
- (European Union) In August 2021, the EU sent firefighting planes to help Turkey during the 2021 Turkish wildfires.
- (Austria) In September 2023, Austrian Chancellor Karl Nehammer, in an interview with the German newspaper Die Welt, called for the termination of full membership negotiations between the EU and Turkey and the development of a new concept within the relations between the EU and Turkey.
- In September 2023, Turkish President Recep Tayyip Erdoğan announced that the European Union was well into a rupture in its relations with Turkey and that they would part ways during Turkey's European Union membership process.
- (Turkey) During the Gaza war, the Turkish president Recep Tayyip Erdoğan accused EU countries of "supporting attacks on Gaza while disregarding the fundamental right to life of its inhabitants."
- (European Union) On 18 April 2024, then-President of the European Council Charles Michel, said that they wanted to establish positive relations between the EU and Turkey and that they agreed that the EU should develop a positive and stable relationship with Turkey.
- (Turkey) On 23 November 2024, Turkish President Recep Tayyip Erdoğan stated that they support the International Criminal Court's arrest decision against Israeli Prime Minister Benjamin Netanyahu and former Israeli Defense Minister Yoav Gallant, and called on 27 EU member states to arrest Netanyahu and Gallant.
- On 17 December 2024, Turkish President Recep Tayyip Erdoğan, in his meeting with President of the European Commission Ursula von der Leyen, stated that they wanted to open a new page in EU-Turkey relations, that Turkey's EU accession negotiations were a strategic goal, that the customs union should be updated again, and that visa liberalization negotiations should be resumed. He announced that they expect the EU-Turkey summit to be held as soon as possible.

== Contemporary issues ==
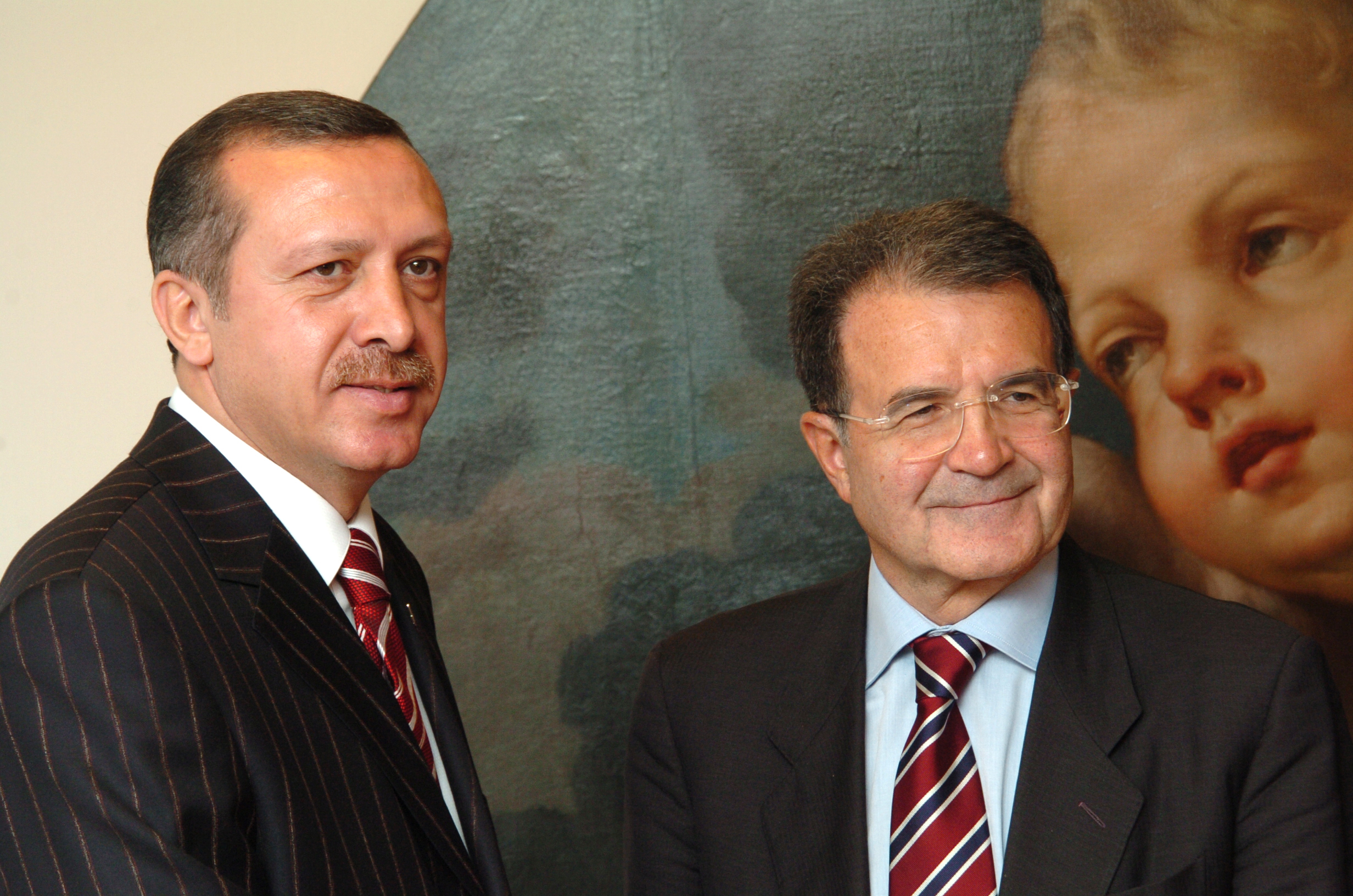
President of the European Commission Romano Prodi with Turkish Prime Minister Recep Tayyip Erdoğan on 23 September 2004

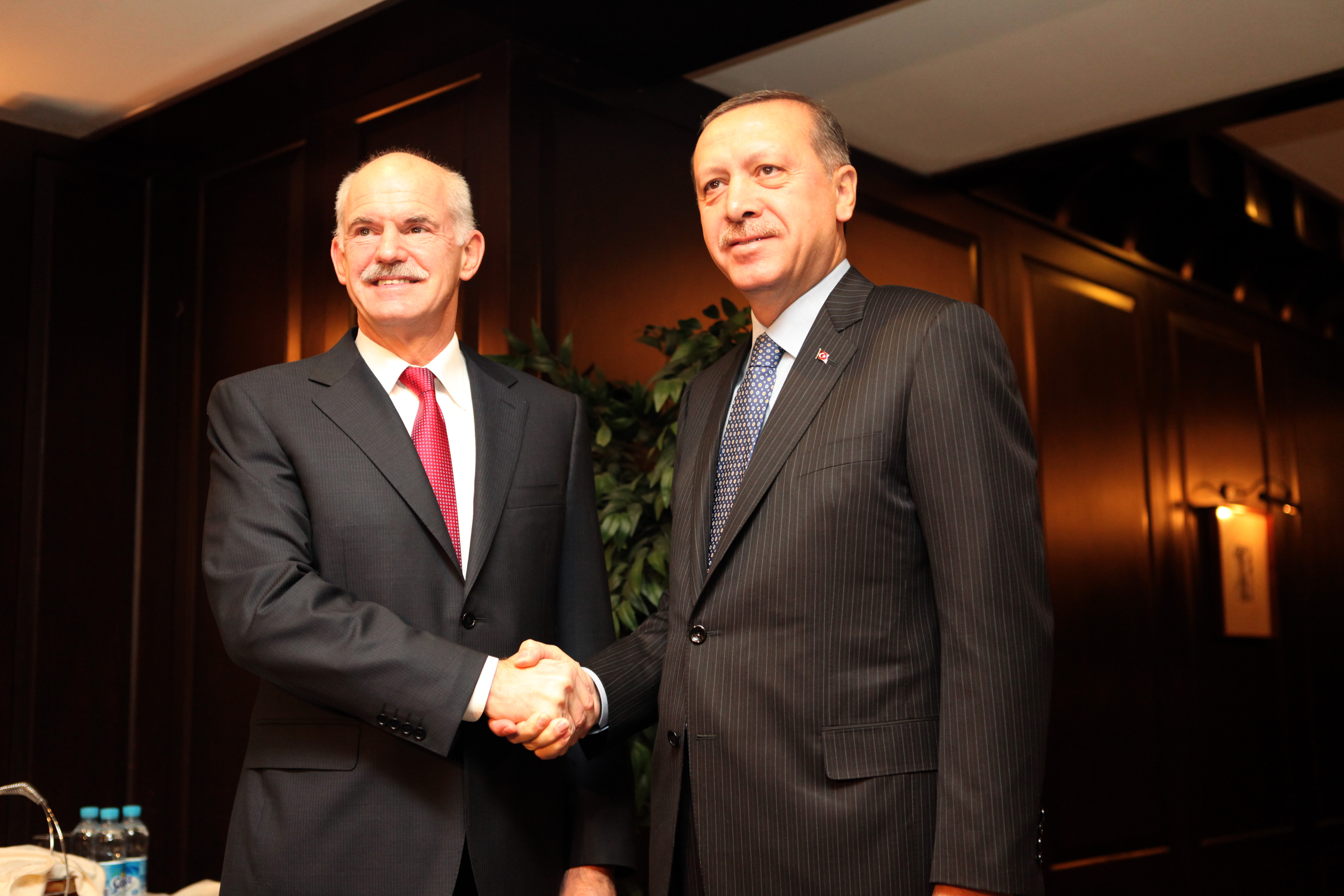
Greek Prime Minister George Papandreou with Turkish Prime Minister Recep Tayyip Erdoğan in Erzurum, on 7 January 2011

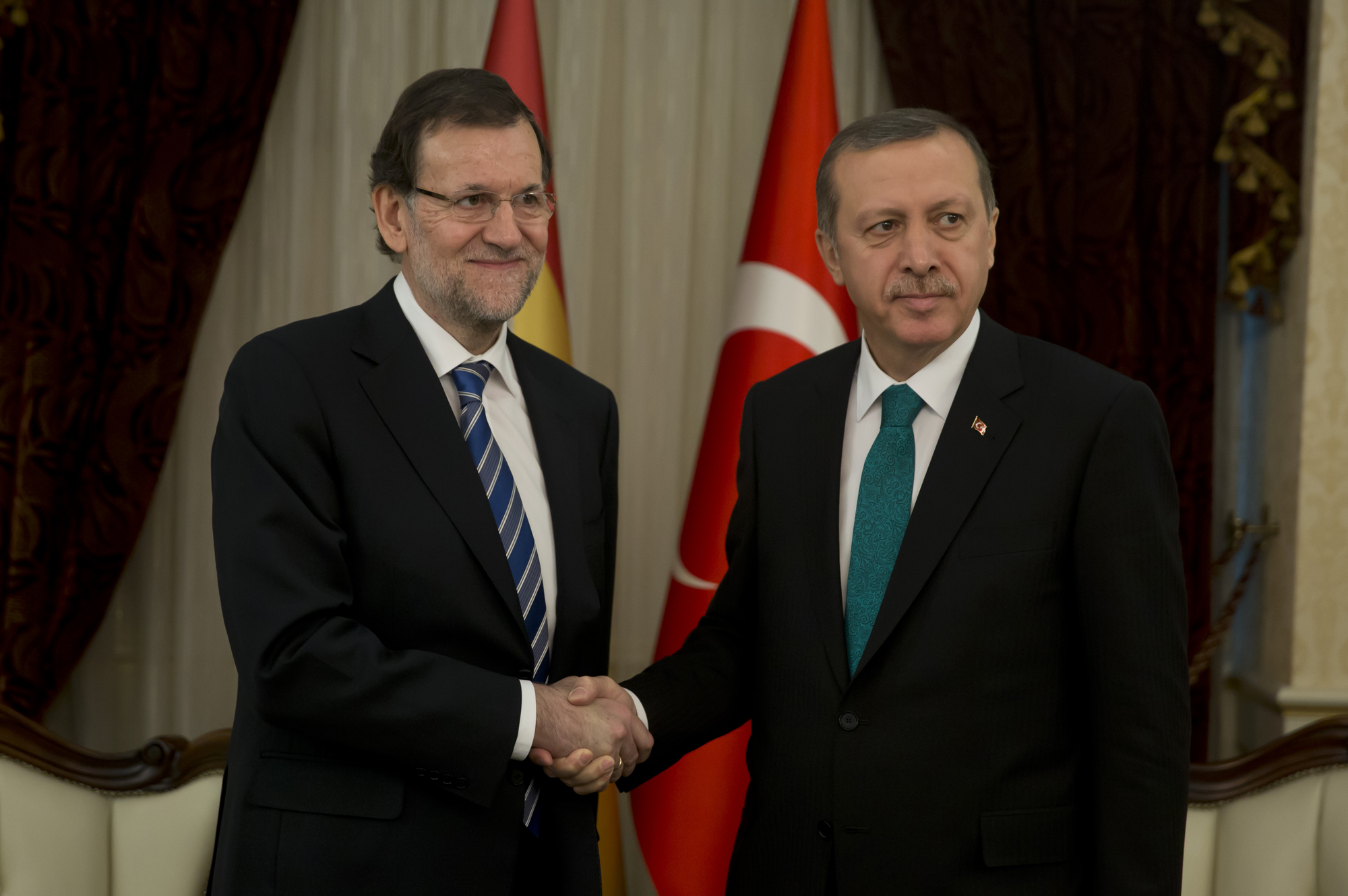
Spanish Prime Minister Mariano Rajoy with Turkish Prime Minister Recep Tayyip Erdoğan on 11 February 2014

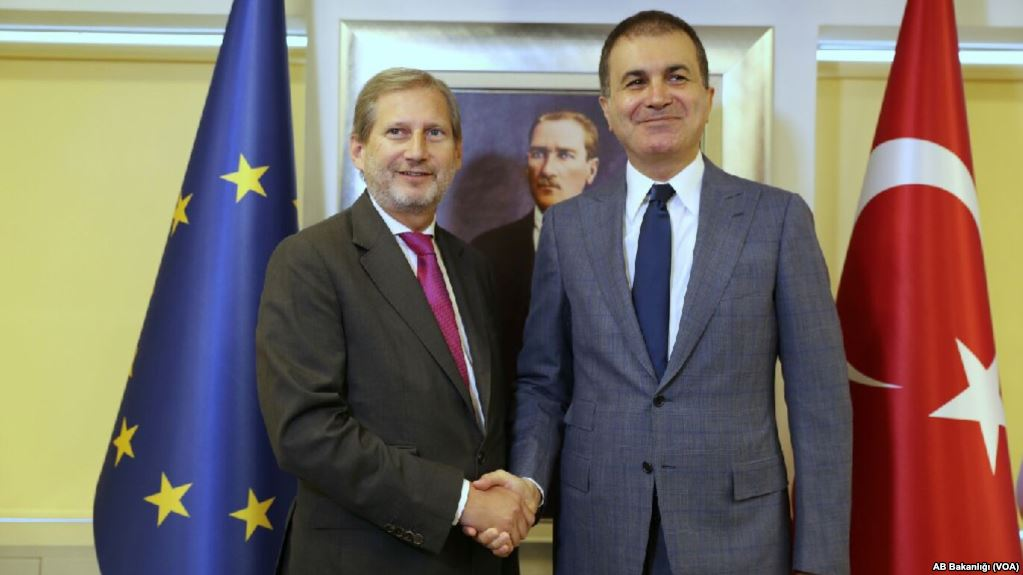
European Commissioner Johannes Hahn with Turkey's EU Minister Ömer Çelik, July 2017

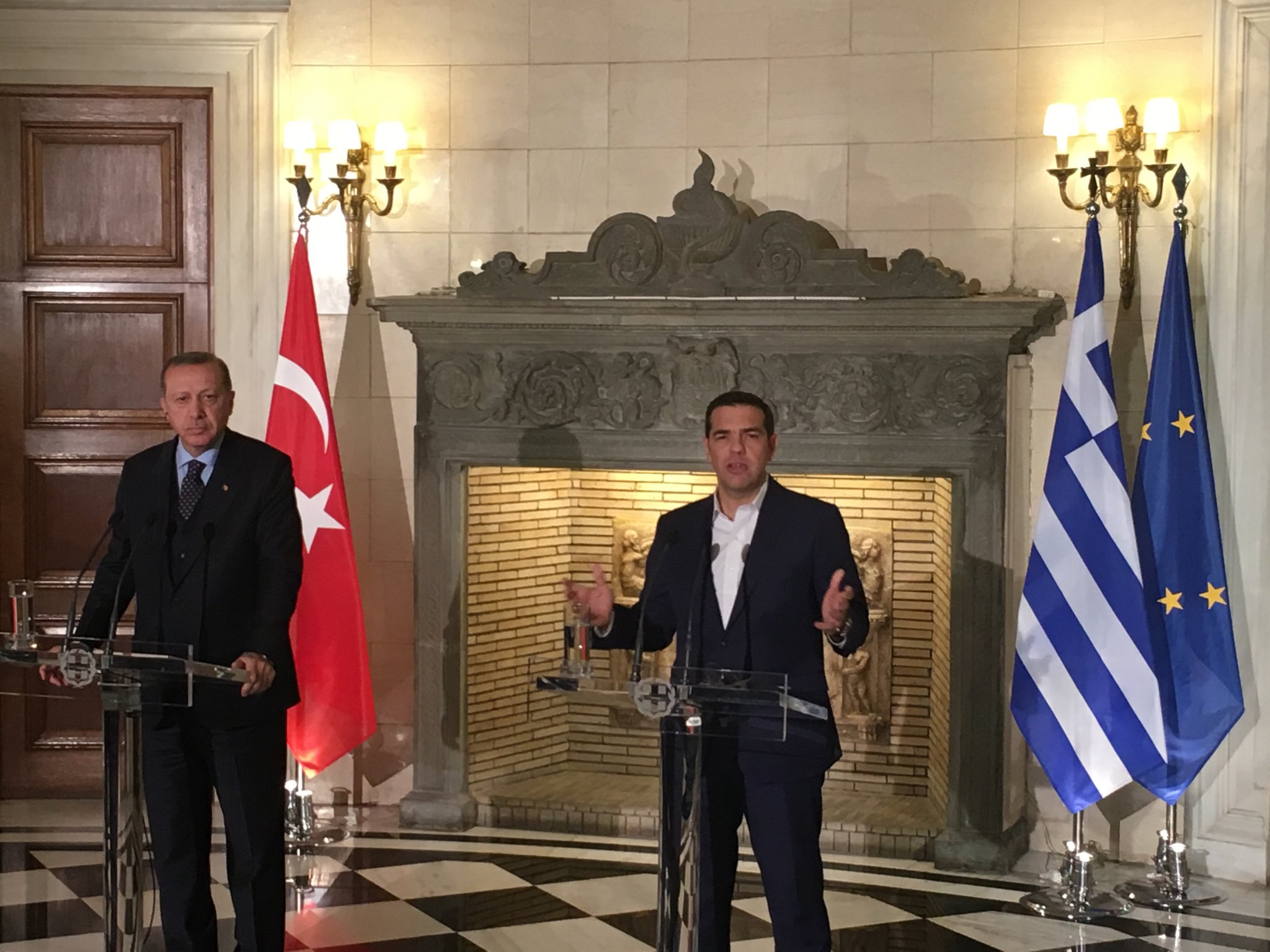
Greek Prime Minister Alexis Tsipras with Turkish President Recep Tayyip Erdoğan on 7 December 2017

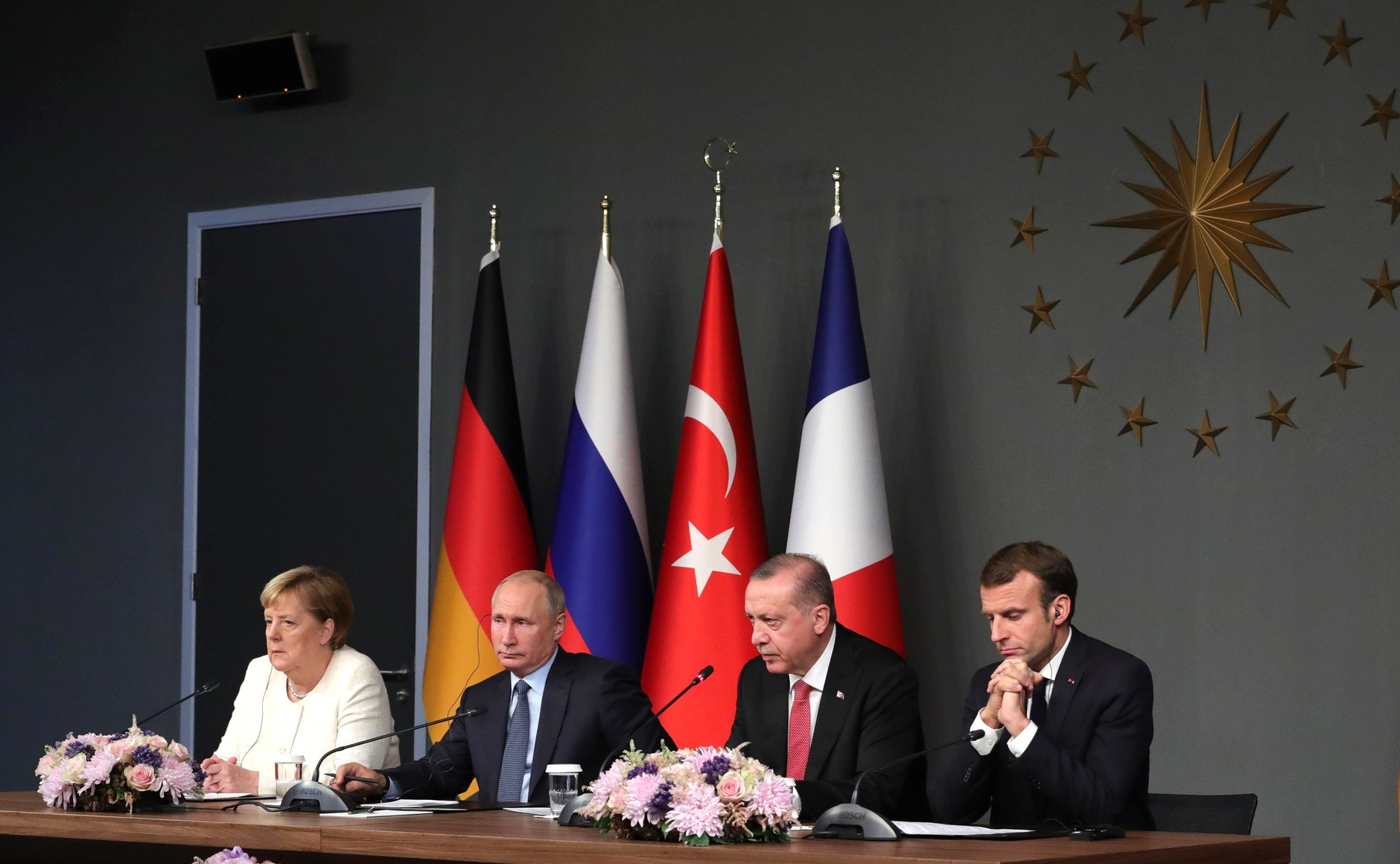
German Chancellor Angela Merkel, French President Emmanuel Macron, Turkish President Recep Tayyip Erdoğan and Russian President Vladimir Putin when giving a press conference as part of the Syria summit in Istanbul, Turkey.

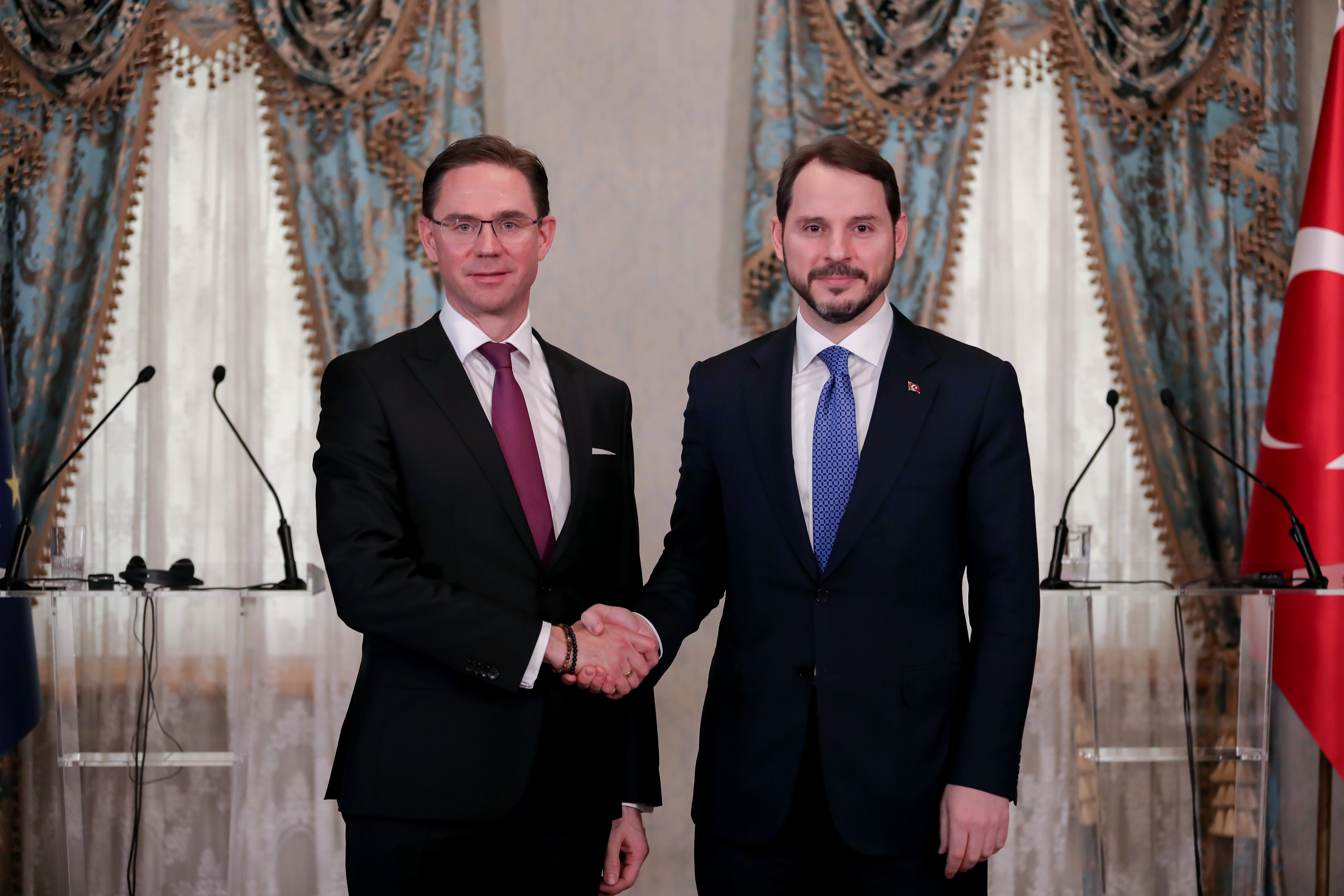
Turkish Treasury and Finance Minister Berat Albayrak with European Commissioner for Jobs, Growth, Investment and Competitiveness Jyrki Katainen on 28 February 2019

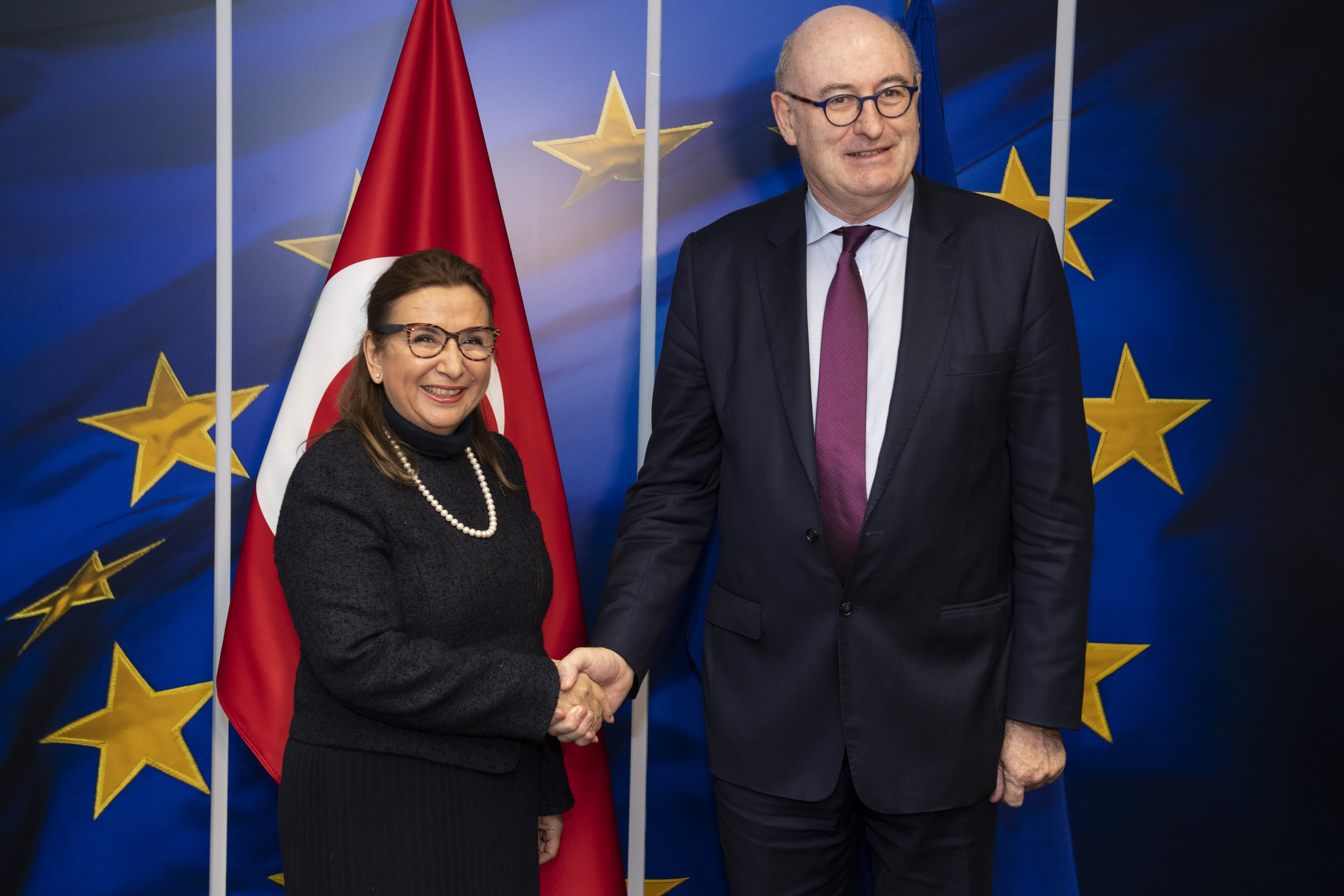
Turkish Trade Minister Ruhsar Pekcan with European Commissioner for Trade Phil Hogan on 19 December 2019

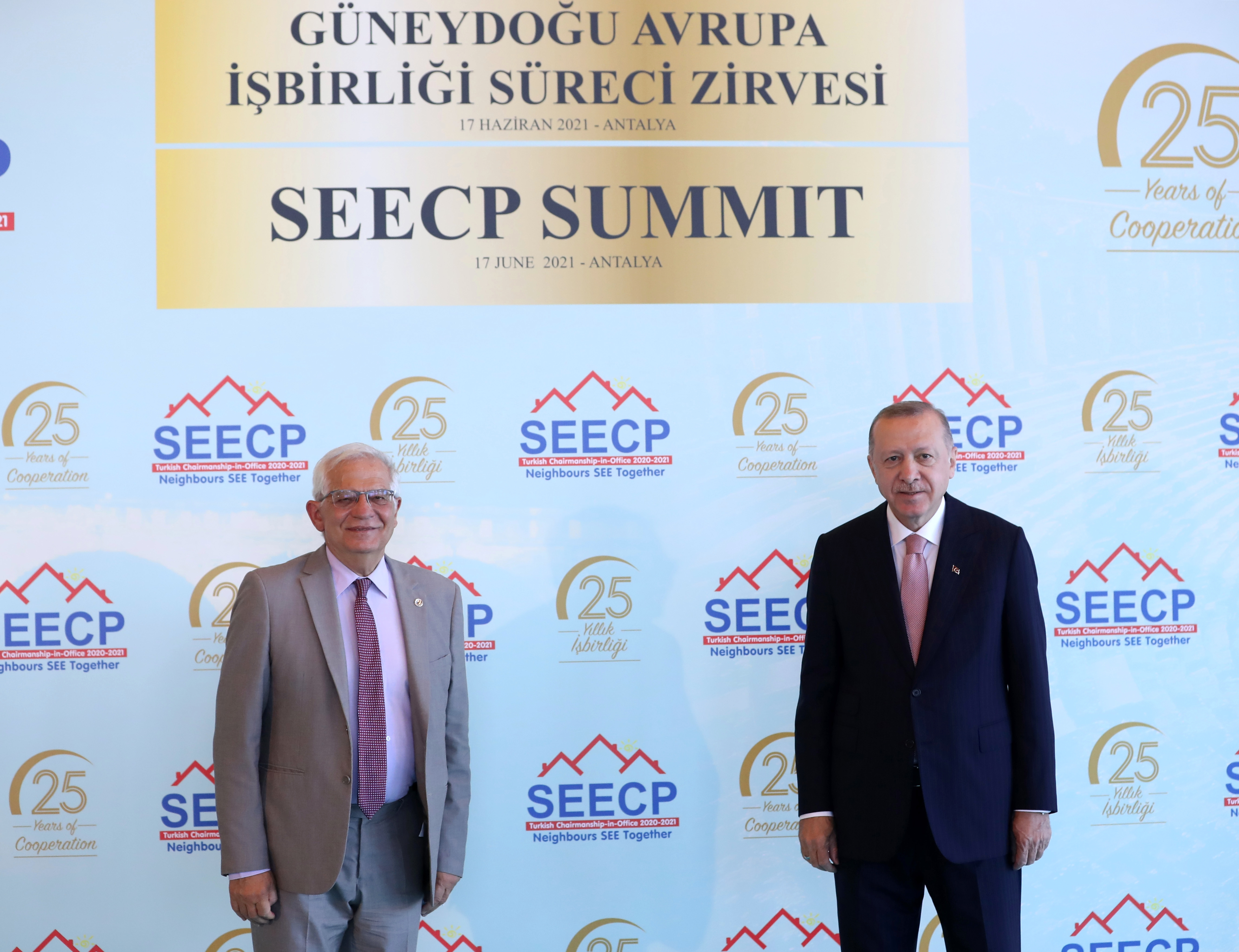
High Representative of the European Union for Foreign Affairs and Security Policy Josep Borrell with Turkish President Recep Tayyip Erdoğan on South-East European Cooperation Process (SEECP) Summit in Antalya, Turkey 17 June 2021

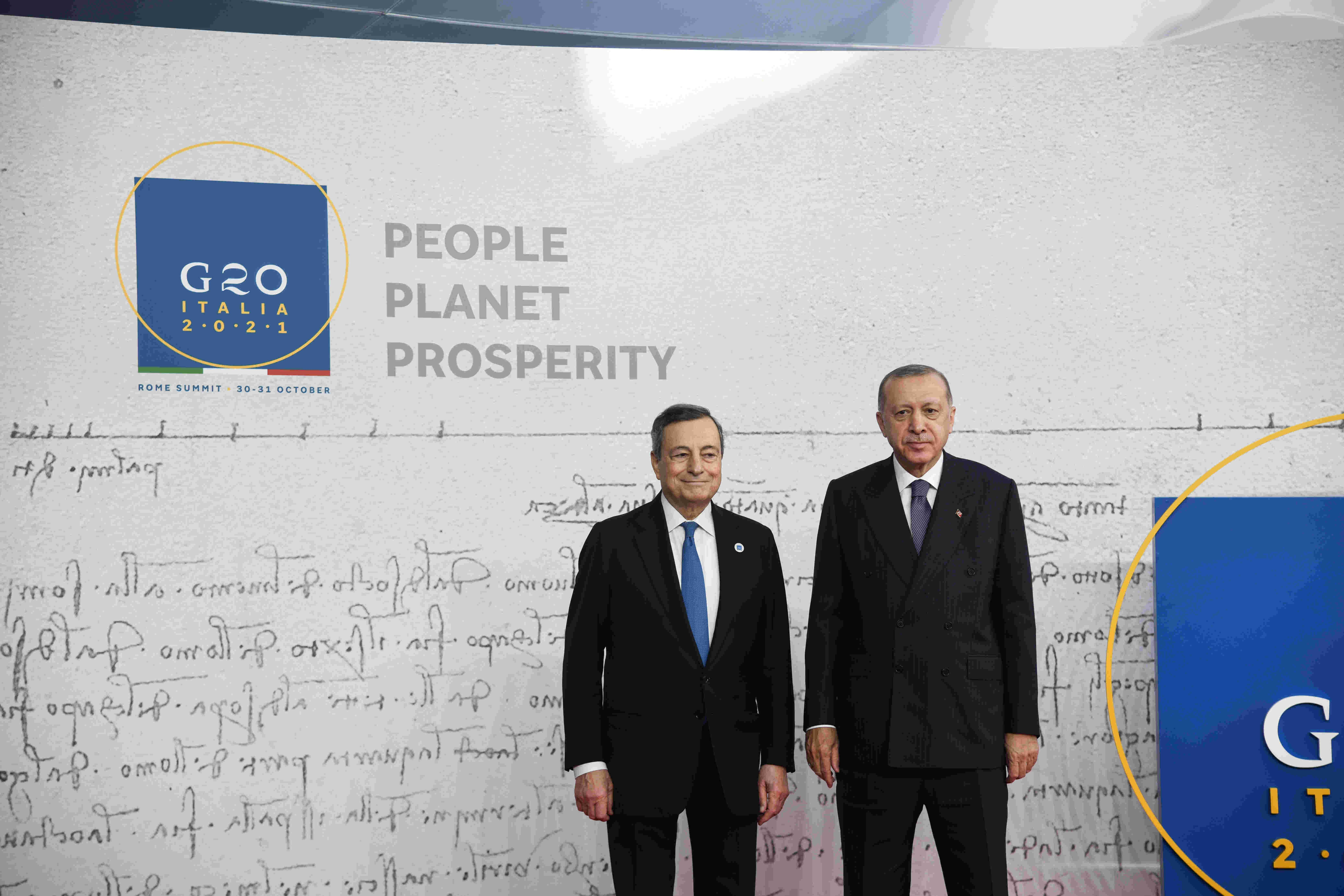
Italian Prime Minister Mario Draghi with Turkish President Recep Tayyip Erdoğan on 2021 G20 Rome summit in Rome, Italy 30 October 2021

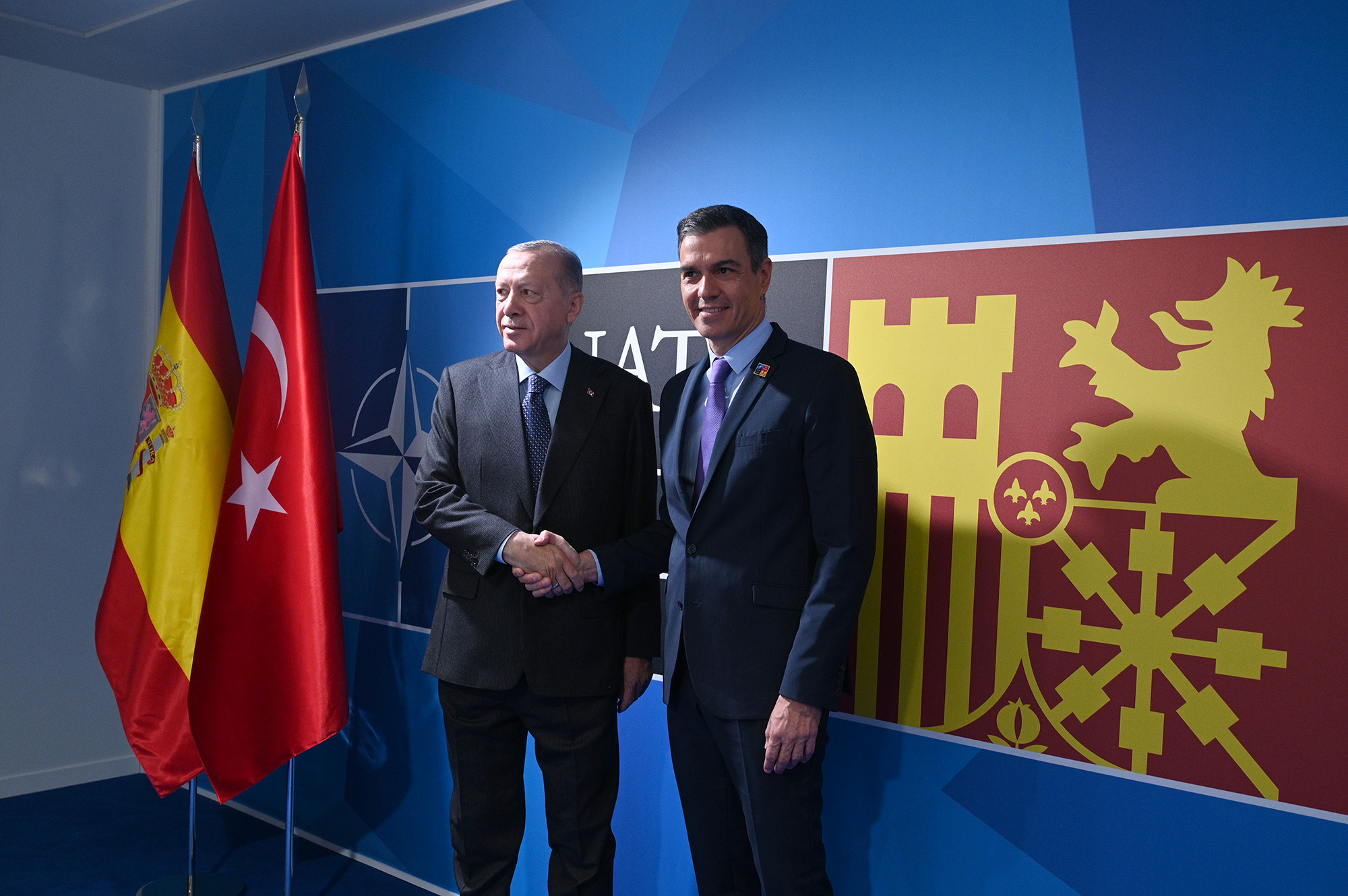
Spanish Prime Minister Pedro Sánchez with Turkish President Recep Tayyip Erdoğan on 30 June 2022

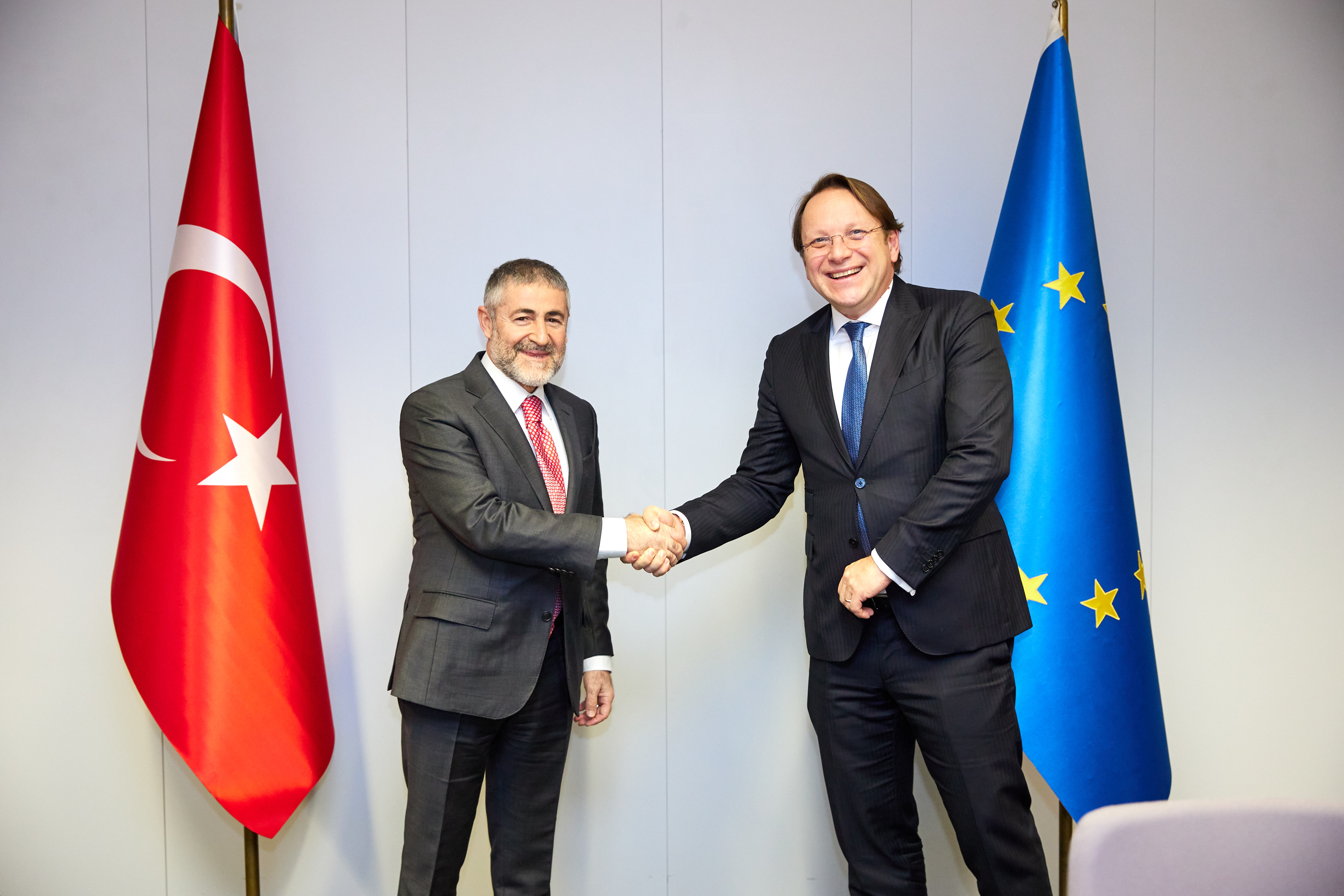
Turkish Treasury and Finance Minister Nureddin Nebati with European Commissioner for Neighbourhood and Enlargement Olivér Várhelyi on 26 January 2023

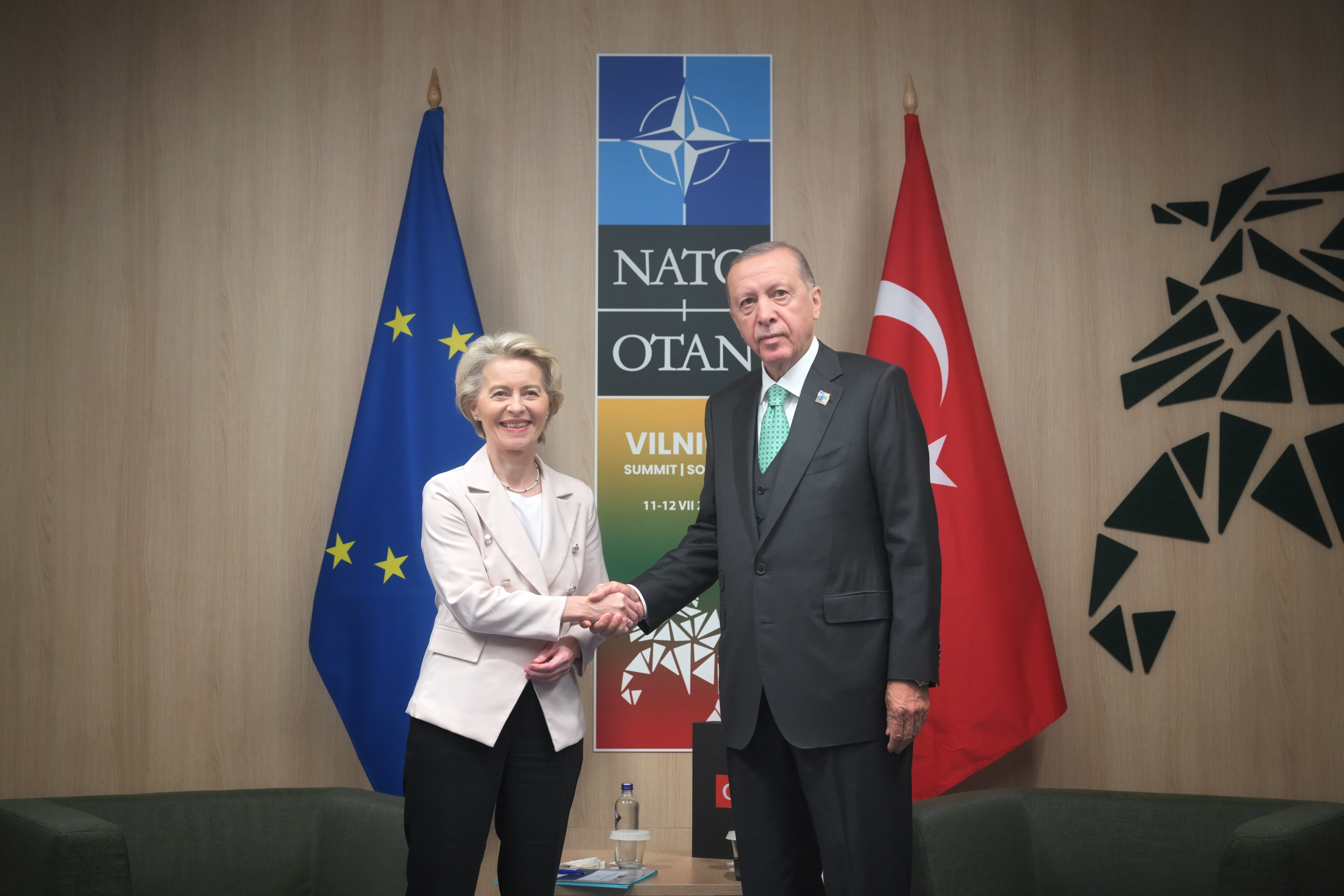
President of the European Commission Ursula von der Leyen with Turkish President Recep Tayyip Erdoğan on 12 July 2023

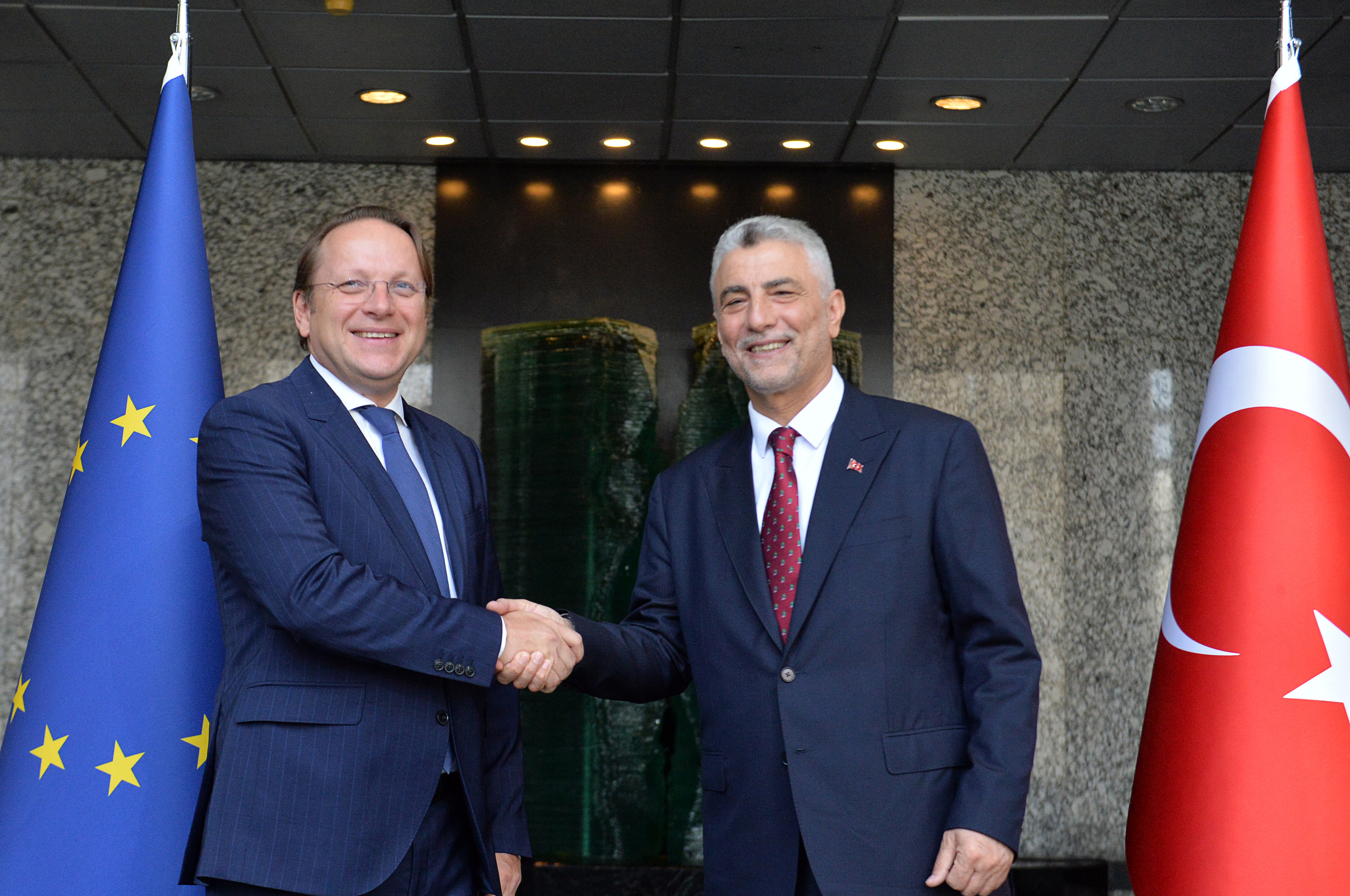
European Commissioner for Neighbourhood and Enlargement Olivér Várhelyi with Turkish Trade Minister Ömer Bolat on 6 September 2023

EU–Turkey relations deteriorated significantly after the 2016–17 Turkish purges, including the suppression of its media freedom and the arrests of journalists, as well as the country's turn to authoritarianism under the AKP and Erdoğan.

=== Developing the customs union ===
The 1996 Customs Union between the EU and Turkey in the view of both sides needs an upgrade to accommodate developments since its conclusion; however, as of 2017, technical negotiations to upgrade the customs union agreement to the advantage of both sides are complicated by ongoing tension between Ankara and Brussels. On 26 June 2018, reacting to the Turkish general election two days earlier, the EU's General Affairs Council stated that "the Council notes that Turkey has been moving further away from the European Union" and thus "no further work towards the modernisation of the EU-Turkey Customs Union is foreseen."

=== EU pre-accession support to Turkey ===
Turkey receives payments from the EU budget as pre-accession support, currently 4.5 billion allocated for the 2014–2020 period (about 740 million Euros per year). The European Parliament's resolution in November 2016 to suspend accession negotiations with Turkey over human rights and rule of law concerns called for the commission to "reflect on the latest developments in Turkey" in its review of the funding program, The ALDE faction has called for a freezing of pre-accession funding. The EP's rapporteur on Turkey, Kati Piri, in April 2017 suggested the funds should be converted and concentrated to support those of the losing "No" side in the constitutional referendum, who share European values and are now under "tremendous pressure".

In June 2017, the EU's financial watchdog, the European Court of Auditors, announced that it would investigate the effectiveness of the pre-accessions funds which Turkey has received since 2007 to support rule of law, civil society, fundamental rights, democracy and governance reforms. Turkish media commented that "perhaps it can explain why this money apparently failed to have the slightest effect on efforts to prevent the deterioration of democracy in this country."

The European Commission's long-term budget proposal for the 2021–2027 period released in May 2018 included pre-accession funding for a Western Balkan Strategy for further enlargement, but omitted Turkey.

=== Turkey persecuting political dissenters as "terrorists" ===
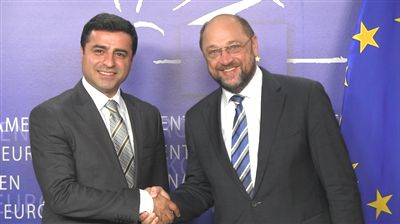
Martin Schulz meeting with the Turkish opposition politician Selahattin Demirtaş, who was later arrested

The increasing persecution of political dissenters as alleged "terrorists" in Turkey creates political tension between the EU and Turkey in both ways: while the EU criticises the abuse of "anti-terror" rhetoric and legislation to curb freedom of speech, Turkish President Recep Tayyip Erdoğan frequently accuses the 27 EU member states and the EU of "harboring terrorists" for providing safe haven to Turkish citizens persecuted for their political views. Turkey called on the 27 EU member states and the EU to end support for the Gülen movement and the PKK, not to host them, to stop the activities of the two organizations, and to extradite the members of the two organizations to Turkey. In April 2017, the Parliamentary Assembly of the Council of Europe (PACE) voted to reopen its monitoring procedure against Turkey. This vote is widely understood to deal a major blow to Turkey's goal of eventual EU membership, as exiting that process was made a precondition of EU accession negotiations back in 2004.

=== EU-Turkey deal on migrant crisis ===
Syrian and Iraqi refugees arrive from Turkey to Lesbos, Greece

The 2015 refugee crisis had a great impact on relations. They became functional, based on interdependence as well as the EU's relative retreat from political membership conditionality. The March 2016 EU-Turkey 'refugee deal' made for deeper functional cooperation with material and normative concessions made by the EU.

In February 2016, Erdoğan threatened to send the millions of refugees in Turkey to EU member states, saying: "We can open the doors to Greece and Bulgaria anytime and we can put the refugees on buses... So how will you deal with refugees if you don't get a deal? Kill the refugees?"

On 20 March 2016, a deal between the EU and Turkey to tackle the migrant crisis formally came into effect. The agreement was intended to limit the influx of irregular migrants entering the EU through Turkey. A central aspect of the deal is the return to the Turkish capital of Ankara any irregular migrant who is found to have entered the EU through Turkey without having already undergone a formal asylum application process. Those that had bypassed the asylum process in Turkey would be returned and placed at the end of the application line.

Greece is often the first EU member-state entered by irregular migrants who have passed through Turkey. Greek islands such as Lesbos are hosting increasing numbers of irregular migrants who must now wait for the determination of asylum status before moving to their ultimate destinations elsewhere in Europe. Some 2,300 experts, including security and migration officials and translators, were set to arrive in Greece to help enforce the deal. "A plan like this cannot be put in place in only 24 hours," said government migration spokesman Giorgos Kyritsis, quoted by AFP. Additional administrative help will be necessary to process the increasing backlogs of migrants detained in Greece as a result of the EU-Turkey deal.

In exchange for Turkey's willingness to secure its borders and host irregular migrants, the EU agreed to resettle, on a 1:1 basis, Syrian migrants living in Turkey who had qualified for asylum and resettlement within the EU. The EU further incentivised Turkey to agree to the deal with a promise of lessening visa restrictions for Turkish citizens and by offering the Turkish government a payment of roughly six billion euros. Of these funds, roughly three billion euros were earmarked to support Syrian refugee communities living in Turkey.

By the end of 2017, the EU-Turkey deal had been successful in limiting irregular migration into Europe through Turkey. However, there are still many doubts about the implementation of the agreement, including how the deal may violate human rights protections outlined in the 1951 Geneva Convention Relating to the Status of Refugees. Critics have argued that the deal is essentially a deterrence strategy that seeks to encourage irregular migrants to file their asylum applications in Turkey rather than face being apprehended and sent back to Ankara, ultimately prolonging their application process.

In December 2020, the contract finished and EU extended it until 2022, giving extra €485 million to Turkey.

Key points from the agreement

- Turkey's EU accession negotiations: Both sides agreed to "re-energise" Turkey's bid to join the European bloc, with talks due by July 2016.
- Additional financial aid: The EU is to speed up the allocation of €3bn ($3.3 bn; £2.3 bn) in aid to Turkey to help Syrian migrant communities
- Visa liberalisation process: Turkish nationals should have access to the Schengen passport-free zone by June 2016, provided that Turkey by then fulfills the known conditions for the step (see section below). This will not apply to non-Schengen countries like Britain.
- One-for-one: For each Syrian returned to Turkey, a Syrian migrant will be resettled in the EU. Priority will be given to those who have not tried to illegally enter the EU and the number is capped at 72,000.
- Returns: All "irregular migrants" crossing from Turkey into Greece from 20 March will be sent back. Each arrival will be individually assessed by the Greek authorities.
- Emergency Relocation: Refugees waiting for asylum in Greece and Italy will be relocated to Turkey first, to reduce the strain on these states and improve living conditions for those seeking asylum.

Criticism

Critics have said the deal could force migrants determined to reach Europe to start using other and potentially more dangerous routes, such as the journey between North Africa and Italy. Human rights groups have strongly criticised the deal, with Amnesty International accusing the EU of turning "its back on a global refugee crisis". A Chatham House paper argued that the deal, by excessively accommodating Erdoğan's demands, is encouraging Turkey to extract "more unilateral concessions in the future." One of the main issues many human rights organizations have with the deal is Turkey fails to meet the standards for hosting refugees. Specifically, many refugees are unable to apply for asylum while in Turkey and while there, they have low-quality living standards. Moreover, in Turkey, refugees are limited to specific areas, which are often lacking in critical infrastructure such as hospitals.

Effectiveness

As of 2019, the deal has had mixed success. It has drastically cut the number of migrants entering European countries, dropping by over half within three years. This result is the most pronounced in European countries situated farther west. However, the portion of the deal that dictated asylum seekers who landed in Greece would be returned to Turkey has been difficult to implement. A small percentage of these people were returned, amounting to 2,130 people. The risk of violating both European and international law has made this key portion of the deal far less successful than it was intended to be.

=== Turkey's dispute with Cyprus and Greece ===
There is a long-standing dispute over Turkey's maritime boundaries with Greece and Cyprus and drilling rights in the eastern Mediterranean. Turkey does not recognise a legal continental shelf and exclusive economic zones around the Greek islands and Cyprus. Turkey is the only member state of the United Nations that does not recognise Cyprus, and is one of the few not signatory to the United Nations Convention on the Law of the Sea, which Cyprus has signed and ratified.

In October 2022, Cypriot President Nicos Anastasiades condemned the European Union's "double standards" and "tolerance" toward Turkey under Recep Tayyip Erdoğan, arguing that "Interests cannot take precedence over principles and values. We cannot say that we are currently making sacrifices to help Ukraine – and rightly so – to cope with the illegal invasion and violation of its territorial integrity and, at the same time, we put our interests first in our relations with Turkey."

In August 2023, Turkish-Cypriot security forces (police and military) attacked U.N. peacekeepers inside the United Nations Buffer Zone in Cyprus at the Pyla. The clashes started over unauthorised construction work in an area under U.N. control. Three peacekeepers were seriously injured and required hospitalisation and U.N. property has been damaged. The U.N. Security Council condemned the incident and the U.N. Secretary-General António Guterres said that "threats to the safety of U.N. peacekeepers and damage to U.N. property are unacceptable and may constitute serious crimes under international law." The European Union also condemned it, but the Turkish president accused the UN force of bias against Turkish Cypriots and added that Turkey will not allow any "unlawful" behavior toward Turks on Cyprus.

=== Visa liberalisation process ===
The EU Commissioner of Interior Affairs Cecilia Malmström indicated on 29 September 2011 that the visa requirement for Turkish citizens will eventually be discontinued. Visa liberalisation will be ushered in several phases. Initial changes were expected in the autumn of 2011, which would include the reduction of visa paperwork, more multi-entry visas, and extended stay periods. In June 2012, the EU authorised the beginning of negotiations with Turkey on visa exemptions for its citizens. Turkish EU Minister Egemen Bağış stated that he expected the process to take 3–4 years. The current visa policy of the EU is a cause of much concern for Turkish businessmen, politicians and Turks with family members in the EU. Egemen Bağış described the situation as: "Even non-candidate countries such as Russia, Ukraine, Moldova and Georgia are currently negotiating for visa-free travel." In September 2012, Turkish Economy Minister Zafer Çağlayan, during a meeting at the WKÖ, said: "We have had a Customs Union for 17 years, and half of our (Turkey's) external trade is with Europe. Our goods can move freely, but a visa is required for the owner of the goods. This is a violation of human rights."

In December 2013, after signing a readmission agreement, the EU launched a visa liberalisation dialogue with Turkey including a "Roadmap towards the visa-free regime". After the November 2015 2015 G20 Antalya summit held in Antalya, Turkey, there was a new push forward in Turkey's EU accession negotiations, including a goal of lifting the visa requirement for Turkish citizens. The EU welcomed the Turkey's commitment to accelerate the fulfilment of the Visa Roadmap benchmarks set forth by participating EU member states. A joint action plan was drafted with the European Commission which developed a roadmap with certain benchmarks for the elimination of the visa requirement. The agreement called for abolishing visas for Turkish citizens within a year if certain conditions are satisfied.

On 18 March 2016, EU reached a migration agreement with Turkey, aiming at discouraging refugees from entering the EU. Under this deal, Turkey agreed to take back migrants who enter Greece and send legal refugees to EU. In exchange, EU agreed to give Turkey six billion euros, and to allow visa-free travel for Turkish citizens by the end of June 2016 if Turkey meets 72 conditions. In March 2016, the EU assessed that Turkey at the time met 35 of the necessary 72 requirements for visa-free travel throughout Europe. In May 2016, this number had risen to 65 out of 72.

On 19 April 2016, Jean-Claude Juncker said that Turkey must meet the remaining criteria to win visa-free access to the Schengen area. But Turkish prime minister Ahmet Davutoğlu argued that Turkey would not support the EU-Turkey deal if EU did not weaken the visa conditions by June 2016. In May 2016, the European Commission said that Turkey had met most of the 72 criteria needed for a visa waiver, and it invited EU legislative institutions of the bloc to endorse the move for visa-free travel by Turkish citizens within the Schengen Area by 30 June 2016. The European Parliament would have to approve the visa waiver for it to enter into force and Turkey must fulfil the final five criteria. The five remaining benchmarks still to be met by Turkey include:

- Turkey must pass measures to prevent corruption, in line with EU recommendations.
- Turkey must align national legislation on personal data protection with EU standards.
- Turkey needs to conclude an agreement with Europol.
- Turkey needs to work with all EU members on criminal matters.
- Turkey must bring its terror laws in line with European standards.

As of August 26, 2021, these conditions had yet to be fulfilled. On 25 June 2021, the EU approved plans to pay Turkey a further three billion euros to update this agreement. In August 2021, however, with President Erdoğan's Justice and Development party polling at historic lows, and with the withdrawal of NATO forces from Afghanistan triggering fears of a new wave of migration to Europe through Turkey, Erdoğan cast doubt on the viability of this arrangement.

=== 2017 Dutch–Turkish diplomatic crisis ===
On March 11, 2017, there was a diplomatic crisis between the EU member Netherlands and Turkey. EU member Netherlands did not allow two Turkish ministers to enter its country. For example, the EU member Netherlands canceled the flight permit of Turkish Foreign Minister Mevlüt Çavuşoğlu, then did not allow Fatma Betül Sayan Kaya, the former Turkish Minister of Family and Social Policies, to enter her country, and expelled her. While EU member states and the EU promised full support and solidarity to the Netherlands, full support and solidarity were not promised to Turkey.

=== 2018 Turkish military intervention in Syria ===
On 22 January 2018, the High Representative of the Union for Foreign Affairs and Security Policy Federica Mogherini said she was "extremely worried" and would seek talks with Turkish officials. She expressed her concerns for two reasons: "One side is the humanitarian one – we need to make sure that humanitarian access is guaranteed and that civilian population and people are not suffering from military activities on the ground." The second issue was the offensive "can undermine seriously the resumption of talks in Geneva, which is what we believe could really bring sustainable peace and security for Syria". On 8 February 2018, the European Parliament condemned the mass arrest of critics in Turkey of the Afrin operation, and criticized the military intervention as raising serious humanitarian concerns. "[MEPs] are seriously concerned about the humanitarian consequences of the Turkish assault and warn against continuing with these disproportionate actions," the parliament's statement said. On 19 March 2018, Federica Mogherini criticized Turkey, saying that international efforts in Syria are supposed to be "aiming at de-escalating the military activities and not escalating them."

=== 2018 EU–Turkey summit ===
On March 26, 2018, the European Union–Turkey Summit was held in Varna, Bulgaria. The EU term chairman, former Bulgarian Prime Minister Boyko Borisov, former EU Council President Donald Tusk, former EU Commission President Jean-Claude Juncker, and Turkish President Recep Tayyip Erdoğan also attended the summit.

=== 2019 Turkish offensive into north-eastern Syria ===
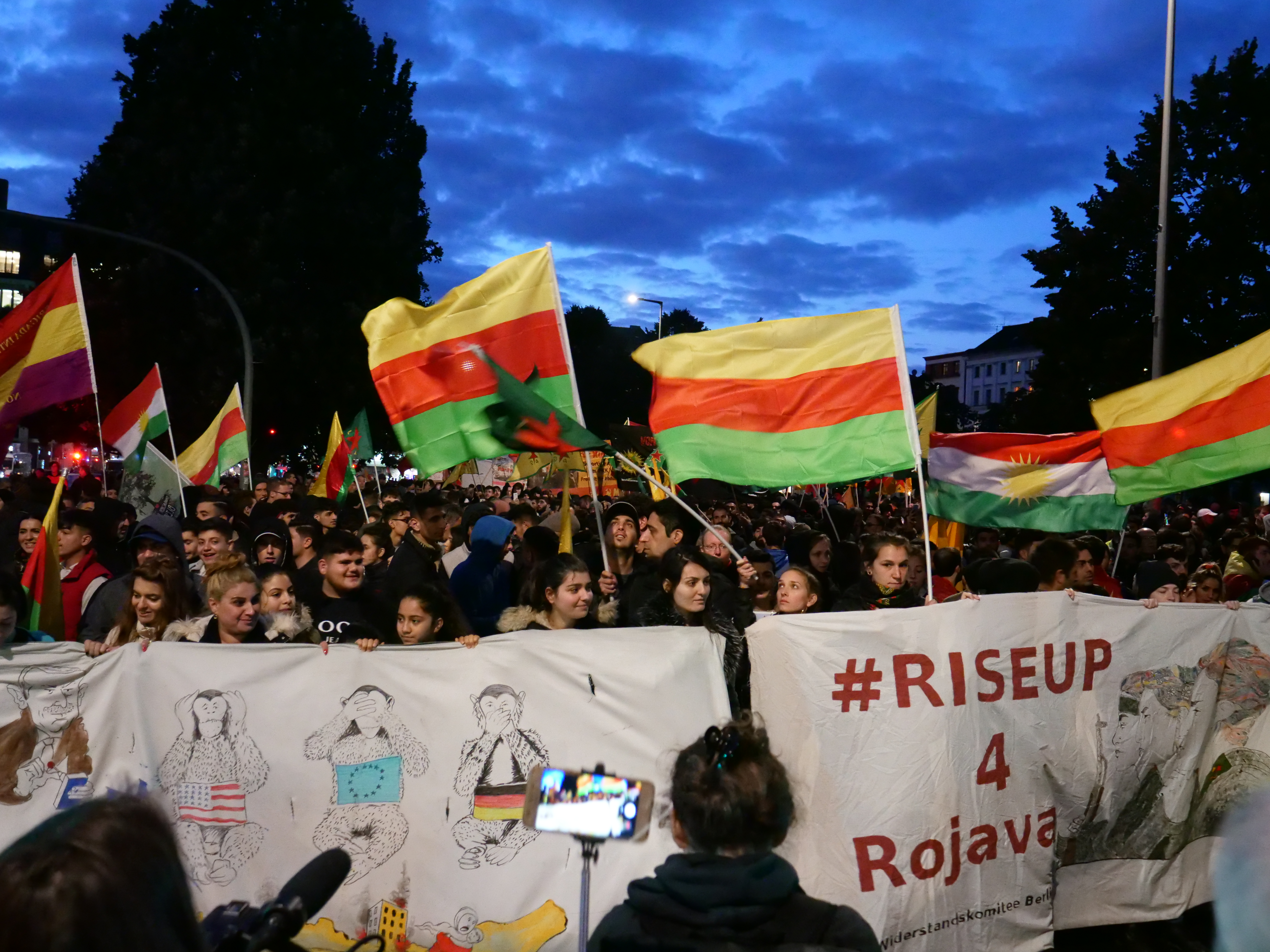
Protest in Berlin against Turkey's military offensive on 10 October 2019

High Representative Federica Mogherini issued a declaration on behalf of the EU on 9 October 2019 stating that "In light of the Turkish military operation in north-east Syria, the EU reaffirms that a sustainable solution to the Syrian conflict cannot be achieved militarily." On 14 October 2019, following Turkey's offensive the Council of the European Union released a press statement condemning Turkey's military action and called for Turkey to cease its "unilateral" military action in north-eastern Syria. It again recalled previous made statements by member states to halt arms exports licensing to Turkey and also recalled that it would not provide "stabilisation or development assistance where the rights of local populations are ignored or violated." Finland and Sweden, the two European Union members that want to become NATO members, stopped arms sales to Turkey due to Turkey's military operation in Syria. In 2022, in negotiations with Turkey over Finland and Sweden's bid to join NATO, two EU member states Finland and Sweden pledged to not provide support to the Kurdistan Workers' Party (PKK), People's Defense Units (YPG) or to the Democratic Union Party (Syria) (PYD) along with pledges to lift the arms embargo they had placed on Turkey over their incursion in Northern Syria, and to co-operate with Turkey in the extradition of Kurdish refugees suspected to have links to the PKK, PYD and YPG. EU member Sweden lifted the arms embargo it imposed on Turkey in September 2022, and another EU member Finland lifted the arms embargo on Turkey in January 2023.

=== Turkish espionage ===
In 2016, Bundestag Parliamentary Oversight Panel members demanded an answer from the German government regarding the reports that Germans of Turkish origin are being pressured in Germany by informers and officers of Turkey's MIT spy agency. According to reports Turkey had 6,000 informants plus MIT officers in Germany who were putting pressure on "German Turks". Hans-Christian Ströbele stated that there was an "unbelievable" level of "secret activities" in Germany by Turkey's MIT agency. According to Erich Schmidt-Eenboom, not even the former communist East German Stasi secret police had managed to run such a large "army of agents" in the former West Germany: "Here, it's not just about intelligence gathering, but increasingly about intelligence service repression."

In 2017, the Flemish interior minister, Liesbeth Homans, started the process of withdrawing recognition of the Turkish-sponsored and second largest mosque in the country, Fatih mosque in Beringen, accusing the mosque of spying in favor of Turkey.

In 2017, Austrian politician Peter Pilz released a report on the activities of Turkish agents operating through ATIB (Avusturya Türkiye İslam Birliği – Austria Turkey Islamic Foundation), the Diyanet's arm responsible for administering religious affairs across 63 mosques in the country, and other Turkish organisations. Pilz's website faced a DDoS attack by Turkish hacktivists and heavy security was provided when he presented the report publicly. Per the report, Turkey operates a clandestine network of 200 informants targeting opposition as well as Gülen supporters inside Austria.

=== Murders of Kurdish activists ===
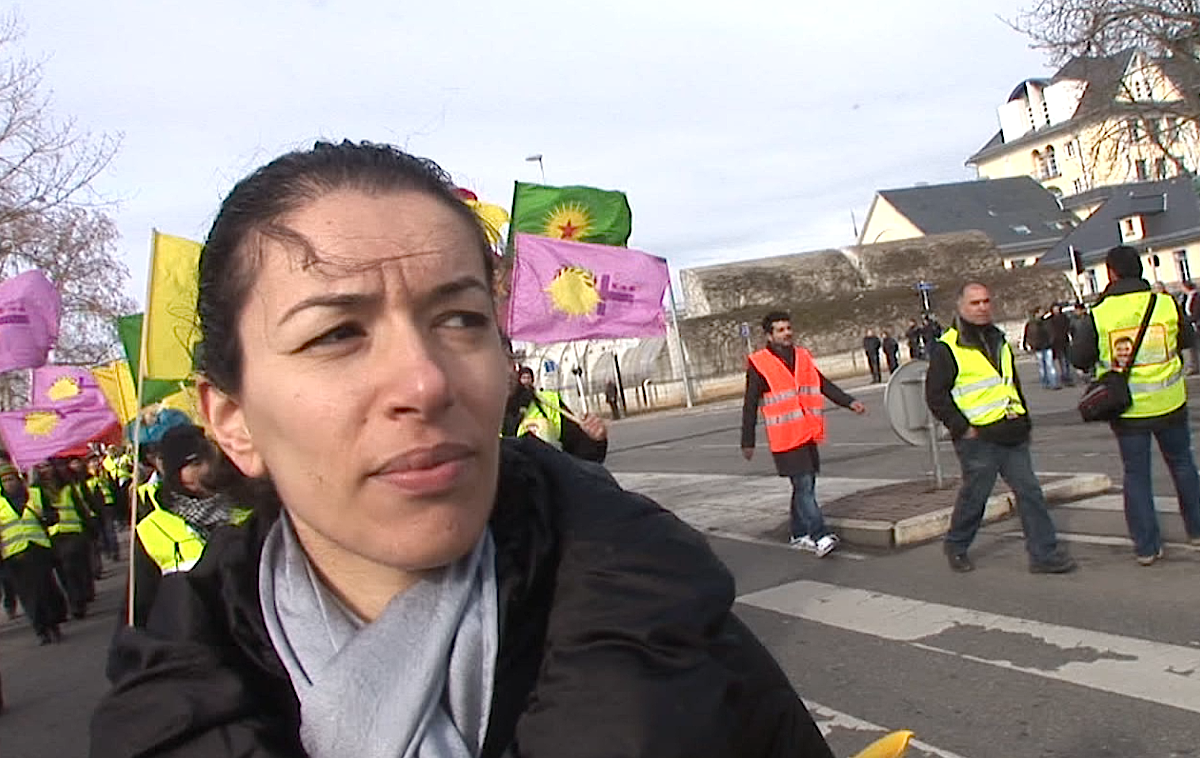
Kurdish activist Fidan Doğan was assassinated in Paris in 2013.

In 1994, Mehmet Kaygisiz, a Kurdish man with links to the PKK (which is designated as a terrorist organisation by Turkey and the EU), was shot dead at a café in Islington, London. His murder remained unsolved and at the time his murder was thought to be drug-related, but in 2016 new documents suggest that Turkey's National Intelligence Organization (MIT) ordered his murder.

Turkey's MIT was blamed for the 2013 murders of three Kurdish activists in Paris.

=== United Nations arms embargo to Libya ===
The European Union launched Operation Irini with the primary task of enforcing the United Nations arms embargo to Libya because of the Second Libyan Civil War. During this period there were several incidents between the Irini forces and the Turkish forces.

=== Armenia–Turkey normalisation process ===
On 14 January 2022, the European Union welcomed the normalisation of Armenia–Turkey relations.

=== Russian invasion of Ukraine ===
The European Union welcomed Turkey's diplomatic efforts to end the Russia-Ukraine war.

=== Turkey's opposition to NATO membership of two EU member states ===
In May 2022, Turkey opposed two EU member states, Finland and Sweden, joining NATO because according to Turkey, they host terrorist organisations which act against Turkey (including the PKK, KCK, PYD, YPG and Gulen movement). Turkey urged the countries to lift their arms embargo on Turkey, not to support the organizations, and to extradite members of the Gülen movement and PKK from the two member states. In May 2022, Turkey requested the extradition of members of the Gülen movement and PKK from the two EU member states, but this was rejected. In May 2022, Turkey quickly blocked two EU members Finland and Sweden from starting their NATO membership applications. On 18 May 2022, Turkey asked the two member states to end their support for PKK, PYD, YPG and the Gülen movement and to stop their activities. In June 2022, the European Parliament urged Turkey to approve Finland and Sweden's bids to join NATO as soon as possible. On 28 June 2022, Turkey signed the tripartite memorandum with Finland and Sweden at the Madrid summit in Madrid, Spain. In July 2022, Turkish President Recep Tayyip Erdoğan announced that if the two EU member states (Finland and Sweden) do not extradite alleged members of the Gülen movement and the PKK, they will not approve the NATO membership of the two countries. Turkey called on two EU members, Finland and Sweden, to fulfill their commitments in the tripartite memorandum. Turkey asked the two member states to end the Kurdish demonstrations. Turkey asked the two member countries to end what it said was Islamophobia and to stop the burning of the Quran. However, the Gülen movement is not on the EU's list of terrorist organizations, while the PKK is on the EU's list of terrorist organizations. While Finland was given NATO approval by Turkey in March 2023, the Turkish parliament did not accept Sweden's application to join NATO until 23 January 2024.

=== 2023 Turkey–Syria earthquake ===
The European Union expressed its condolences to those who lost their lives due to the earthquake in Turkey and Syria, and wished the injured a speedy recovery. The EU has announced that they are ready to help Turkey and Syria.

=== 2025 Turkish protests ===
In the wake of the arrest of Ekrem İmamoğlu and subsequent protests, President of the European Commission Ursula von der Leyen said that Turkey would need to maintain its democratic values to avoid potentially losing its European Union candidate country status, stating that the EU wished to stay closely tied to Turkey. A joint statement released by the European Union's High Representative for Foreign Affairs and Security Policy Kaja Kallas and Commissioner for Neighbourhood and Enlargement Marta Kos remarked that the European Union held Turkey to a higher standard in implementing democratic values due to its candidate status and Council of Europe membership.

=== Turkey's obstruction of the Republic of Cyprus participate in COP31 ===
On 29 May 2026, the EU Commission Spokesperson Anna-Kaisa Itkonen reacted strongly to Turkey's obstruction of the EU member state Republic of Cyprus's participation in the 31st UN Climate Change Conference (COP31). Spokesperson Itkonen called on Turkey to immediately lift the barrier to the Republic of Cyprus's participation. At the EU climate ministers' meeting on 26 June 2026, Wopke Hoekstra, the European Commissioner for Climate Action, Net Zero, and Clean Growth, stated that Turkey's obstruction of Cyprus's participation in COP31 was unacceptable and that the EU stood in full solidarity with Cyprus.

=== International Criminal Court ===
Among the 125 member states that are parties to the Rome Statute of the International Criminal Court are the 27 EU member states, whereas Turkey is not a party to this statute. While the 27 EU member states and the 125 ICC member states are obliged to detain and surrender individuals facing charges should they set foot on their territory, Turkey which is not a party to the Rome Statute bears no such obligation. then–Turkish prime minister and current Turkish president Recep Tayyip Erdoğan stated in October 2004 that Turkey would "soon" ratify the Rome Statute, and the Turkish constitution was amended in 2004 to explicitly allow nationals to be surrendered to the Court. However, in January 2008, the Turkish government changed its position, deciding to suspend its accession to the Rome Statute of the ICC due to concerns that it might undermine efforts against the Kurdistan Workers' Party (PKK). In November 2024, Turkish President Erdoğan welcomed the International Criminal Court’s arrest warrants for Israeli leaders and called on the 27 EU member states that are parties to the ICC to implement these warrants immediately.

== Comparison ==
	European Union	Turkey
Population	447,206,135	85,664,944
Area	4,324,782 km^{2} (1,669,808 sq mi)	783,356 km^{2} (302,455 sq mi)
Population Density	115/km^{2} (300/sq mi)	110/km^{2} (284.9/sq mi)
Capital	Brussels (de facto)	Ankara
Government	Supranational parliamentary democracy based on the European treaties	Unitary presidential constitutional republic
First Leader	High Authority President Jean Monnet	President Mustafa Kemal Atatürk
Current Leader	Council President António Costa; Commission President Ursula von der Leyen	President Recep Tayyip Erdoğan; Vice President Cevdet Yılmaz
Official languages	24 official languages	Turkish
Main Religions	72% Christianity (48% Roman Catholicism, 12% Protestantism, 8% Eastern Orthodoxy, 4% Other Christianity), 23% non-Religious, 3% Other, 2% Islam	92% Islam, 6% Irreligion, 2% Other, 0.2% Christianity
Ethnic groups	Germans (ca. 80 million), French (ca. 67 million), Italians (ca. 60 million), Spanish (ca. 47 million), Poles (ca. 46 million), Romanians (ca. 16 million), Dutch (ca. 16 million), Greeks (ca. 11 million), Portuguese (ca. 11 million), and others	70-75% Turkish, 19% Kurds, 6-11% others or not stated
GDP (nominal)	$16.477 trillion, $31,801 per capita	$1.64 trillion, $19,020 per capita

== Summits ==
=== EU-Turkey Summits ===
- 1st EU-Turkey Summit: 26 March 2018 in Varna, Bulgaria
- 2nd EU-Turkey Summit: No date or place yet announced

== Turkey's foreign relations with EU member states ==
- Austria
- Belgium
- Bulgaria
- Croatia
- Czech Republic
- Denmark
- Estonia
- Finland
- France
- Germany
- Greece
- Hungary
- (Republic of Ireland) Ireland
- Italy
- Latvia
- Lithuania
- Luxembourg
- Malta
- Netherlands
- Poland
- Portugal
- Romania
- Slovakia
- Slovenia
- Spain
- Sweden

Turkey has no diplomatic relations with Cyprus as Turkey does not recognize the government of the Republic of Cyprus.

== See also ==
- Foreign relations of the EU
- Foreign relations of Turkey
- Independent Commission on Turkey
- Censorship in Turkey
- Censorship and media freedom in Turkey
- Human rights in Turkey
- Press freedom in Turkey
- Purges in Turkey (2016–present)
- Russia–Turkey relations
- Turkey–United Kingdom relations
- Turkey–United States relations
- EU–NATO relations
- Borders with EU members
  - Bulgaria–Turkey border
  - Greece–Turkey border
