= Austria–Turkey relations =

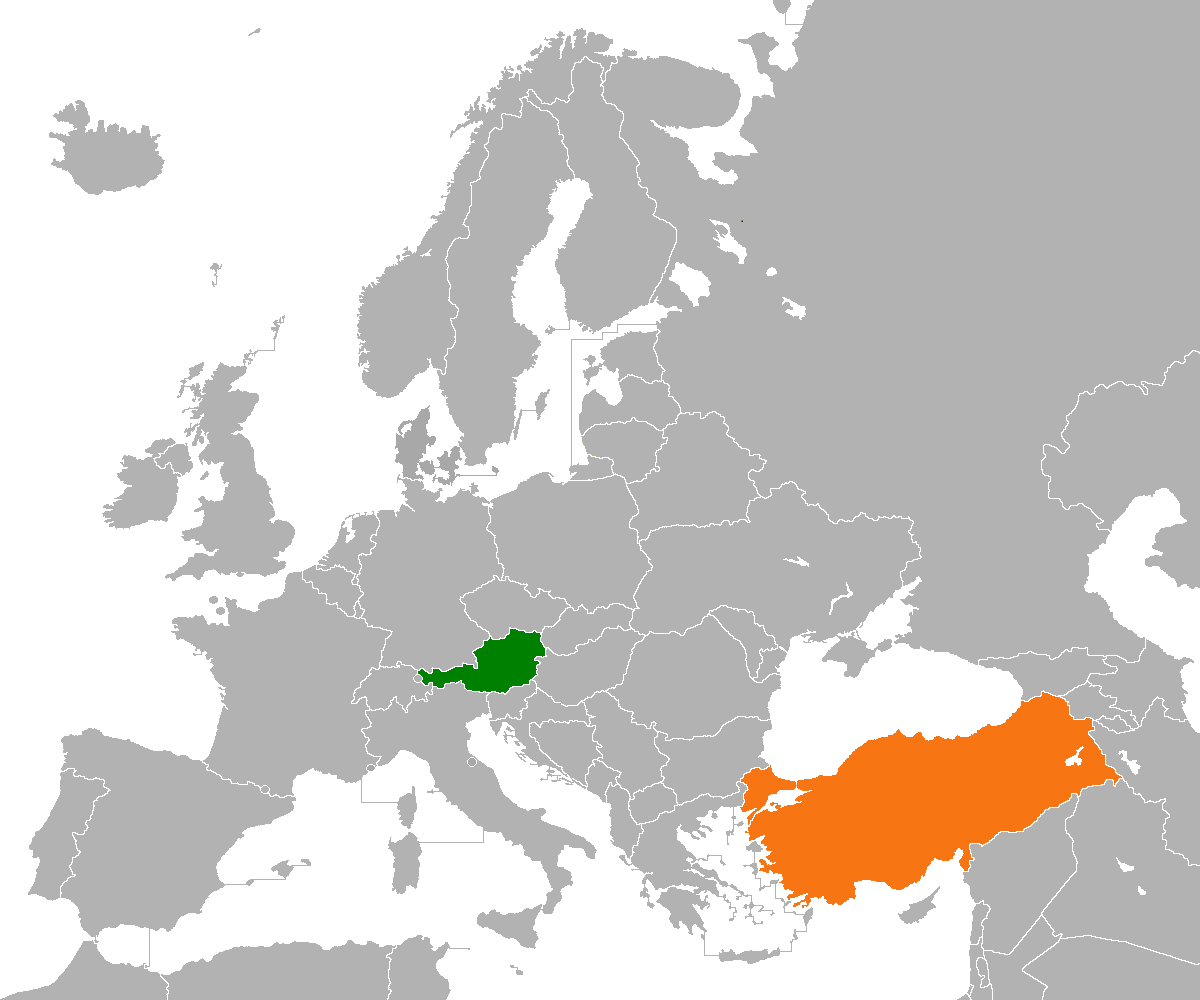
- Austria: Turkey

Diplomatic mission
- Embassy of Austria, Ankara: Embassy of Turkey, Vienna

The Austrians and Turks have had relations with each other dating back centuries, from the modern-day Austria and Turkey to their predecessor states, the Habsburg Empire and Ottoman Empire respectively. Having fought a number of wars, they fought alongside each other as allies during the First World War before their empires simultaneously dissolved due to their defeats.

Today, both countries are relatively smaller than their historical empires. Relations between the modern-day states are relatively normal, however Austrian opposition — particularly among conservative and right-wing parties — to the Accession of Turkey to the European Union as well as Turkish immigration to Austria has become a point of tension. Both countries are members of the Council of Europe. Austria is an EU member and Turkey is an EU candidate. Turkey is a member of NATO. Austria is not a member of NATO.

== The Habsburgs and the Ottomans ==
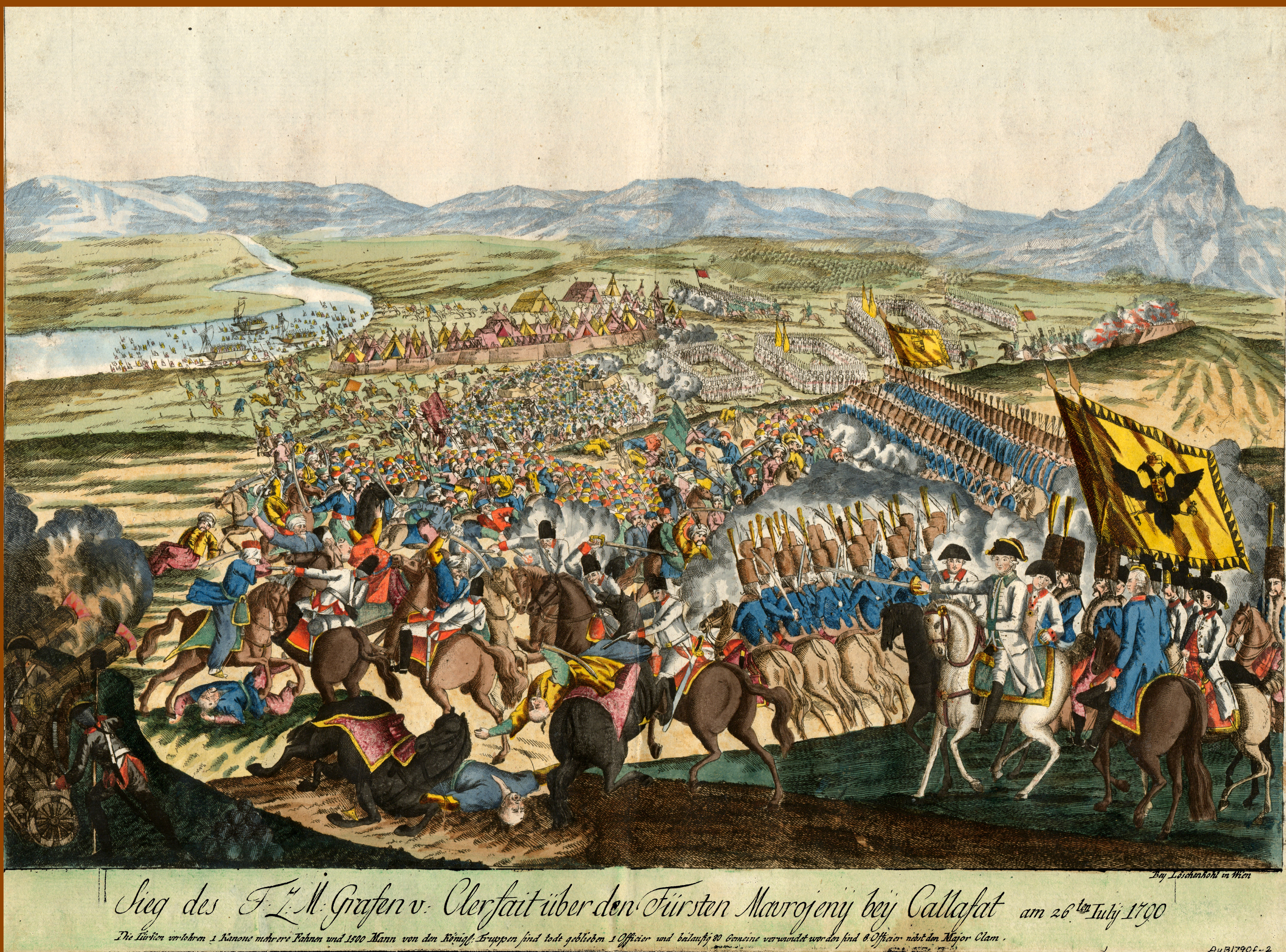
Clash between Austrian and Turkish troops during the Austro-Turkish War of 1788–1791

From the Middle Ages until the twentieth century, today's Austria and Turkey were the core regions within much larger empires. Austria was the seat of the House of Habsburg and Turkey was ruled by the House of Osman (also known as the Ottoman Dynasty). The Habsburg and Ottoman states were both large multi-ethnic conglomerations sustained by conquest. These rival empires waged frequent wars against each other over control of much Central Europe and the Balkans.

During its peak, the Ottoman Empire threatened to conquer the Austrian capital of Vienna twice: in 1529 and 1683. After the second Ottoman defeat at Vienna and the end of the Great Turkish War in 1699; however, the Habsburgs gained the upper hand, and captured Hungary and Croatia from the Ottomans. After these gains, Austria was no longer able to advance into the Balkans; because of the rival influence of Russia, in a stalemate and dispute known as the Eastern Question.

While Ottoman control in the Balkans declined, the Austrians were not able to annex any new territory until Bosnia in 1908, and even that caused a diplomatic crisis (the Bosnian crisis). In the interim, Russia had helped several nationalities in the Balkans to rebel against the Ottomans and create separate nation-states in the Balkans. After the culmination of all the changes from the Greek War of Independence (1821–1829) to the Balkan Wars (1912–1913) the Austrian and Ottoman empires no longer bordered each other. This allowed both to join the Central Powers as allies during the First World War. The defeat of the Central Powers led to the overthrow of both monarchies and the collapse of both empires.

== Austrian and Turkish republics ==
Austria and Turkey currently have normal relations with each other. However, there are some minor complications. Austria, which has approximately 250,000 Turks living there (about 3% of Austria's population), has been at the forefront of blocking Turkey's accession to the European Union, particularly among conservative and right-wing parties such as the Austrian People's Party and Freedom Party of Austria which maintains a significant political presence.

== Austria's position in Turkey's accession to the European Union ==
On 10 November 2010, relations between the two countries were excessively tensed after the Turkish ambassador to Austria, Kadri Ecvet Tezcan, accused the Austrian public and political elite of xenophobia and called on international organisations with buildings in Vienna to relocate to another country. The Freedom Party called for the suspension of diplomatic relations and for stopping EU accession talks with Ankara.

In December 2017, Turkey accused the incoming Austrian government of discrimination and racism, after it would not agree to Ankara joining the EU. In addition, Turkey slammed the EU for not condemning the Austrian government's approach. Also, the Turkish foreign ministry accused the incoming government of “dishonesty,” and warned that their approach would bring Austria “to the brink of losing Turkey’s friendship” and be met with “the reaction that it deserves.” In December 2017, then–Austrian Chancellor Sebastian Kurz called for the end of accession negotiations between the EU and Turkey. In September 2023, Austrian Chancellor Karl Nehammer, in an interview with the German newspaper Die Welt, called for the termination of full membership negotiations between the EU and Turkey and the development of a new concept within the relations between the EU and Turkey.

== Resident diplomatic missions ==
- Austria has an embassy in Ankara and a consulate-general in Istanbul.
- Turkey has an embassy in Vienna and consulates-general in Bregenz and Salzburg.
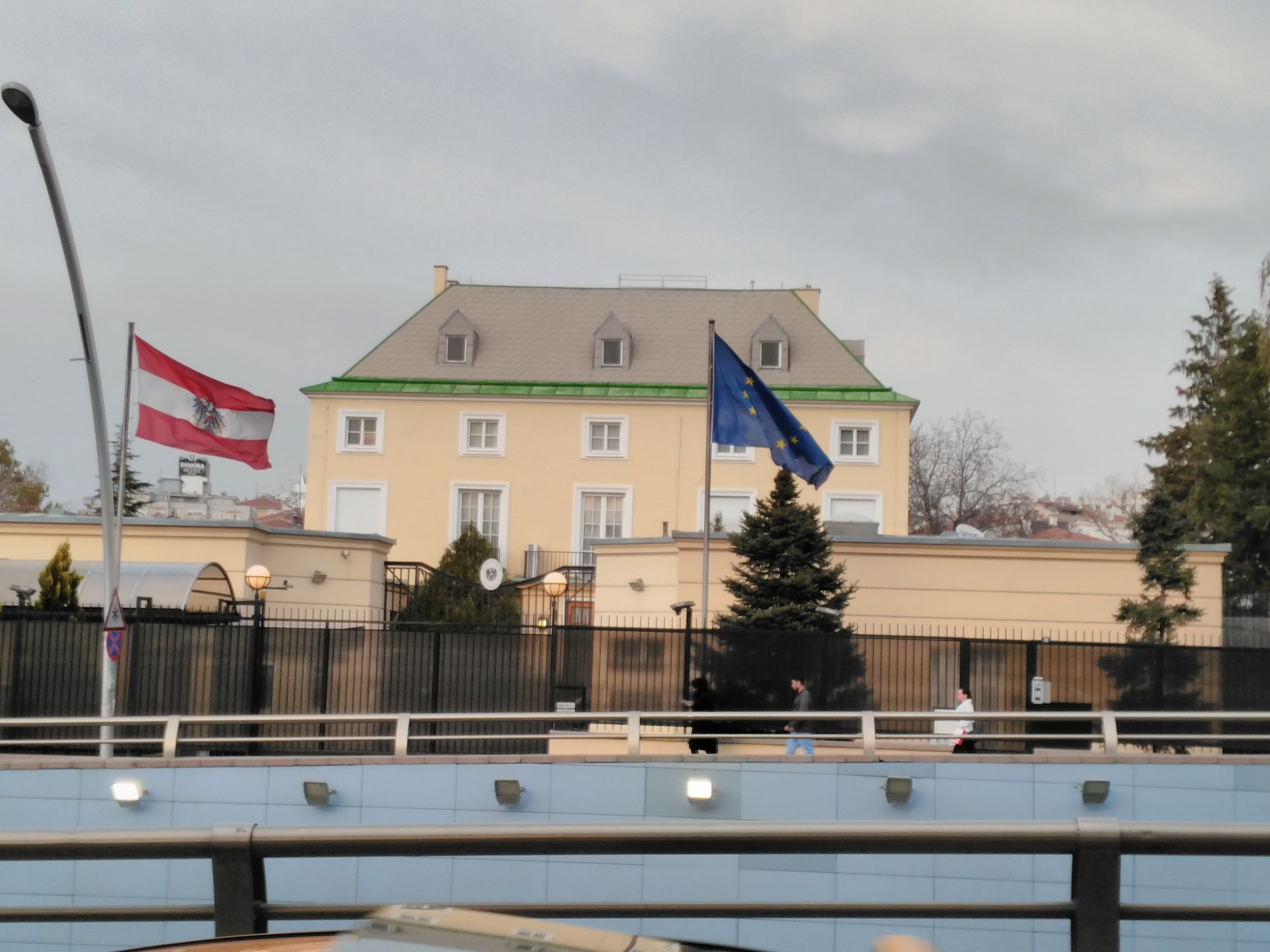
Embassy of Austria in Ankara

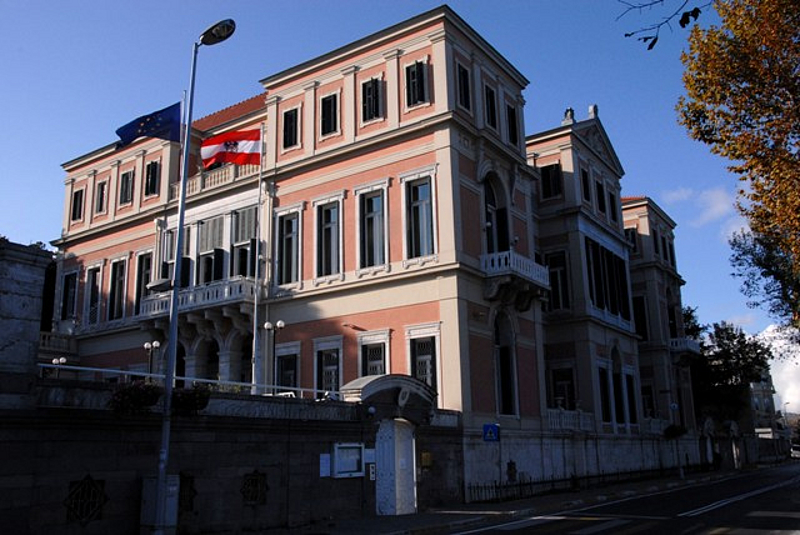
Consulate-General of Austria in Istanbul

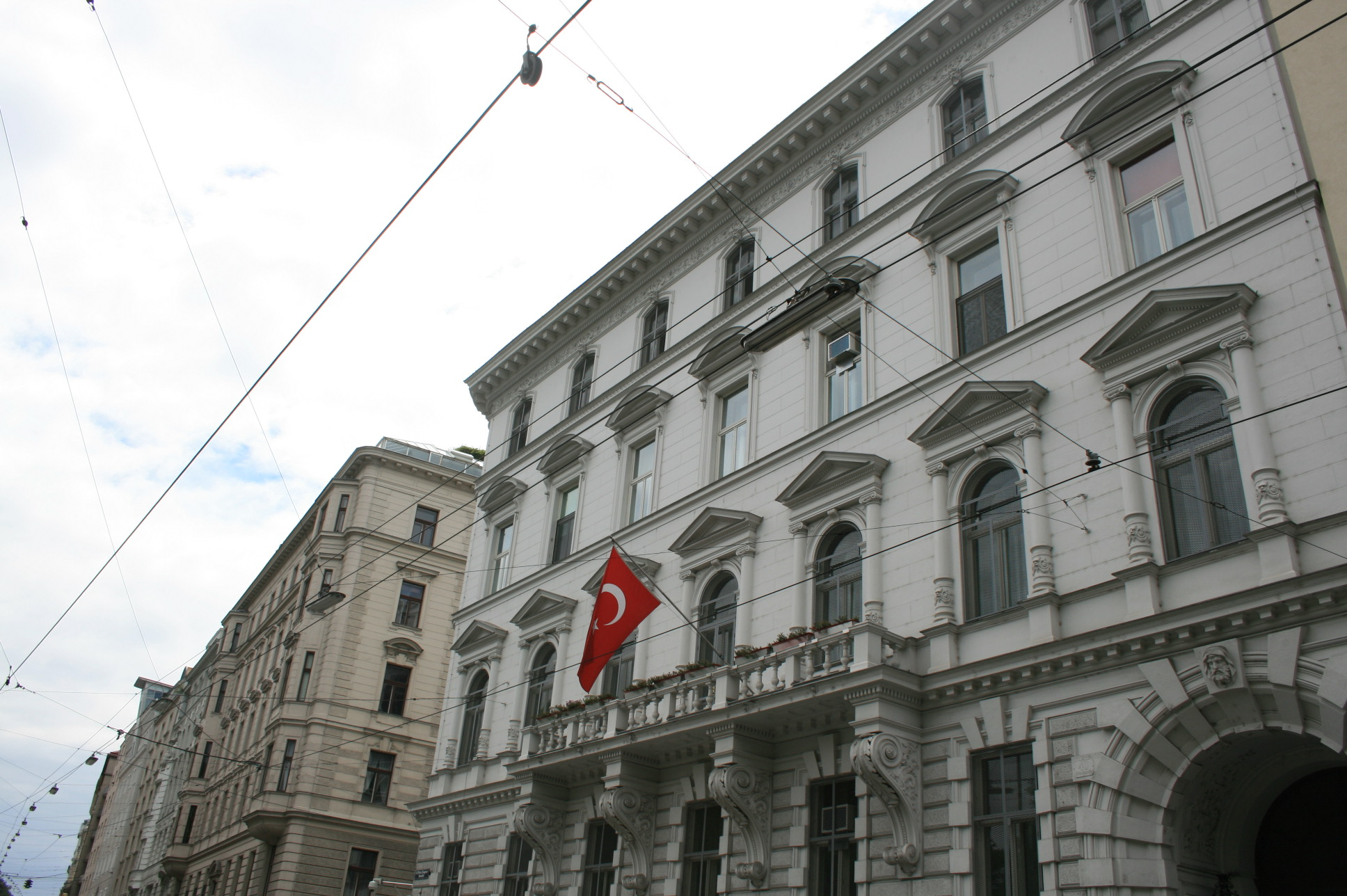
Embassy of Turkey in Vienna

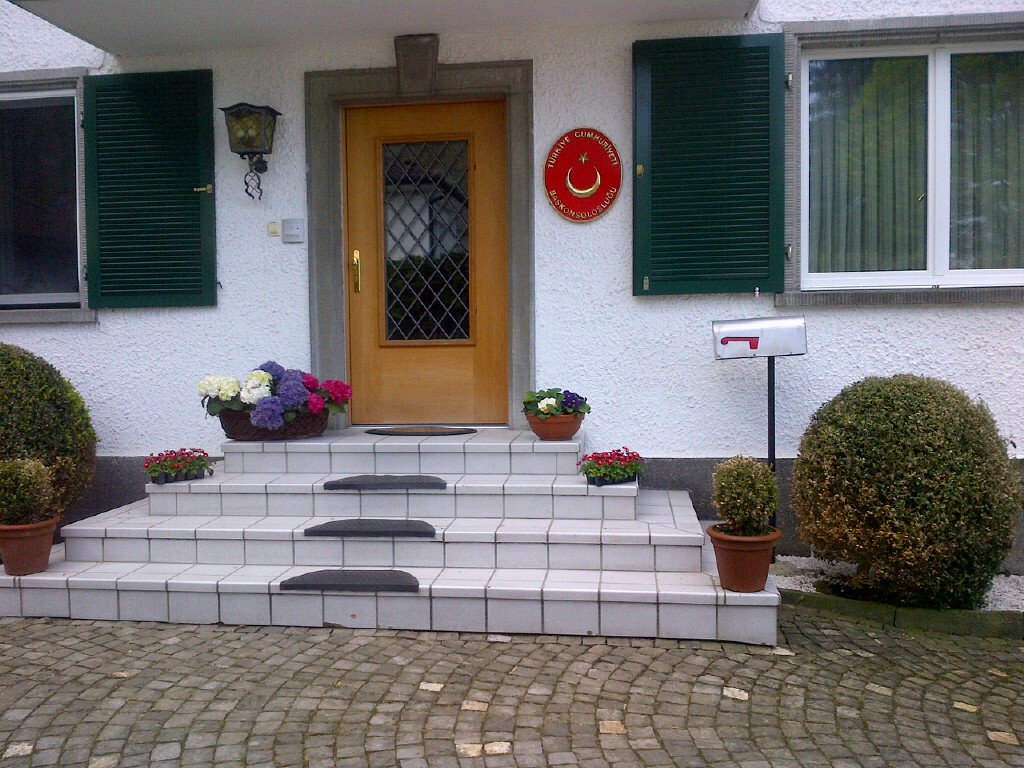
Consulate-General of Turkey in Bregenz

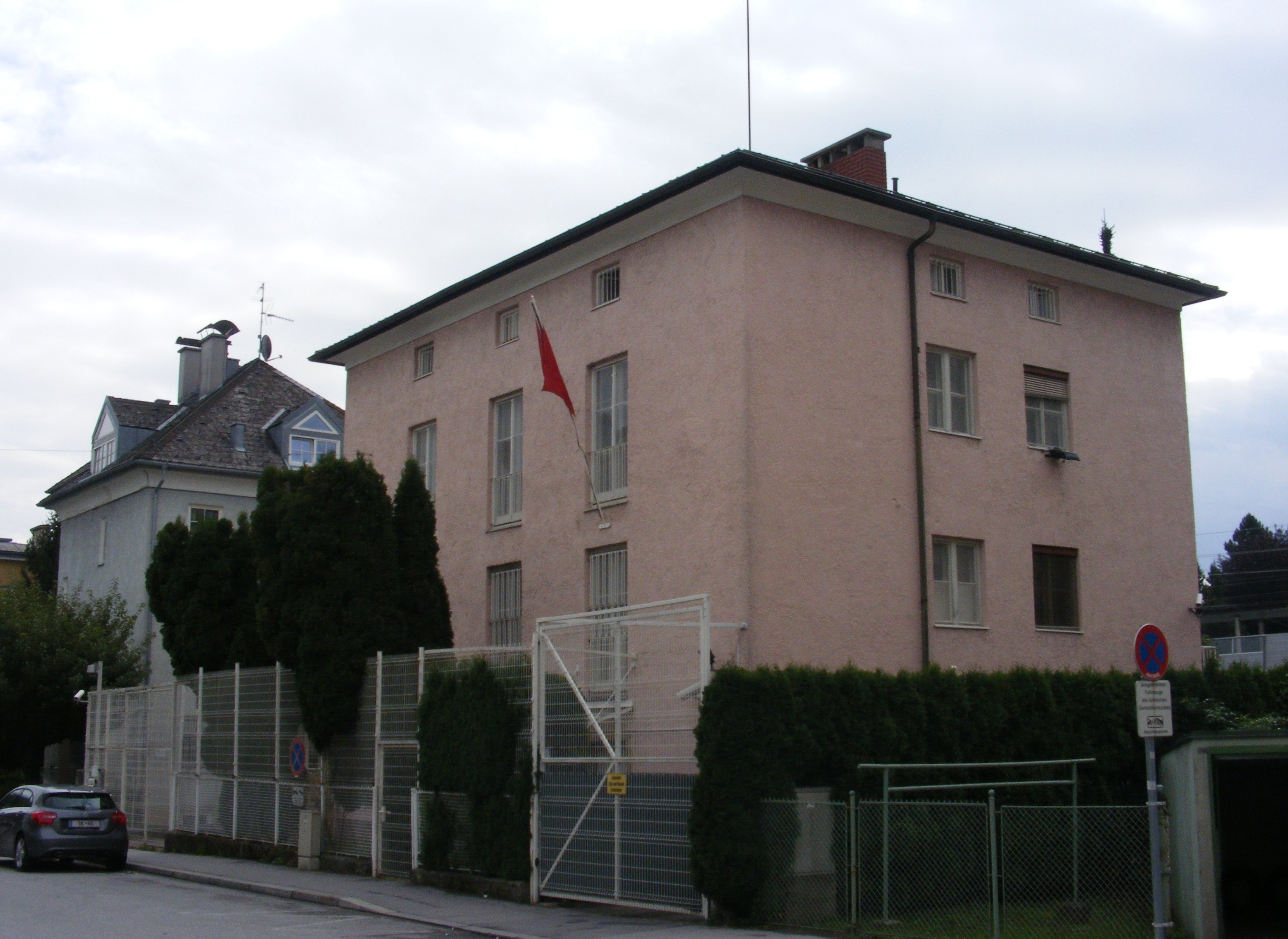
Consulate-General of Turkey in Salzburg

== See also ==
- Foreign relations of Austria
- Foreign relations of Turkey
- Austria–NATO relations
- EU–Turkey relations
- 2017 Turkish constitutional referendum § Austria
- Austrians in Turkey
- Islam in Austria
- Turks in Austria
- Turks in Europe
