= Turkish population =

World population of ethnic Turkish people

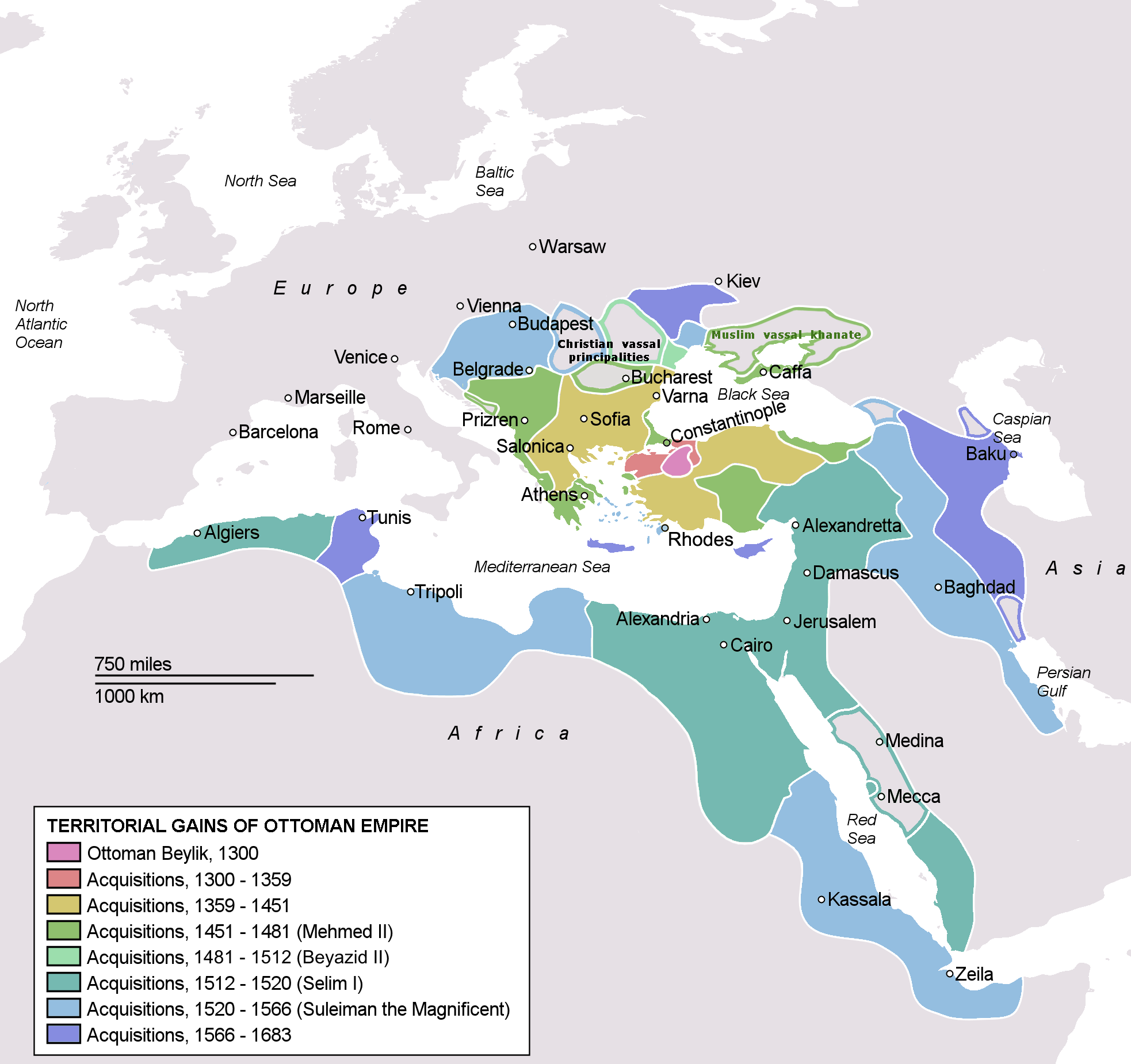
The Turkish people are scattered throughout the former Ottoman Empire. Today they form a majority in Turkey and Northern Cyprus. There are also significant Turkish minorities in Balkans, the Caucasus, and the Arab world.

The Turkish population refers to the number of ethnic Turkish people in the world. During the Seljuk (1037–1194) and Ottoman (1299–1923) eras, ethnic Turks were settled across the lands conquered by the two empires. In particular, the Turkification of Anatolia (modern Turkey) was the result of the Battle of Manzikert in 1071 and the formation of the Sultanate of Rum. Thereafter, the Ottomans continued Turkish expansion throughout the regions around the Black Sea and the Mediterranean Sea. Consequently, today the Turkish people form a majority in Turkey and Northern Cyprus. There are also significant Turkish minorities who still live in the Balkans, the Caucasus, the Middle East and the Levant, and North Africa.

More recently, the Turkish people have emigrated from their traditional areas of settlement for various reasons, forming a large diaspora. From the mid-twentieth century onwards, unskilled workers from Turkey settled mainly in German and French speaking countries of Western Europe, in contrast, a "brain drain" of skilled workers from Turkey migrated mostly to North America. Moreover, ethnic Turks from other traditional areas of Turkish settlement have emigrated mostly due to political reasons. For example, the Meskhetian Turks were deported to Central Asia from Georgia in 1944; Turkish Cypriots have emigrated mostly as refugees to the English-speaking world during the Cyprus conflict and its immediate aftermath; Cretan Turks have significant populations in the Arab world as a result of being expelled from Greece; etc..

== Traditional areas of Turkish settlement ==
=== Turkish majorities ===
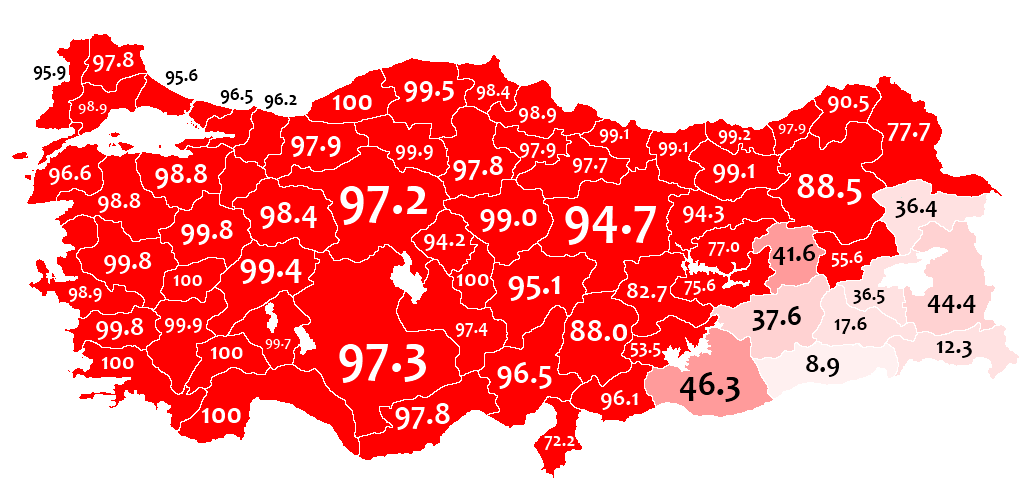
The 1965 Turkish census was the last census in which people were asked about their mother tongue. This map shows the distribution of people who spoke Turkish during this period.

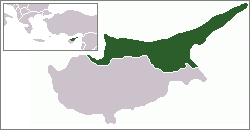
Prior to the Cyprus dispute Turkish Cypriots lived throughout the island of Cyprus. However, the 1974 Cypriot coup d'état initiated by the Greek military junta, which sought to annex the island to Greece, prompted the Turkish invasion of Cyprus followed by the declaration of the Turkish Federated State of Cyprus. Since the establishment of the Turkish Republic of Northern Cyprus in 1983 the majority of Turkish Cypriots live mostly in the northern region of the island. The break-away state remains internationally unrecognised, except by Turkey.

Country	Official State census figures	Other estimates	Constitution recognition	See also
Turkey	N/A. The Turkish census collects data on country of birth but does not collect data on ethnicity.	60,000,000 – 65,000,000	The Turkish language is the official language of the Republic of Turkey, under Article 3 of the 1982 Turkish constitution.	Turkish people
Northern Cyprus	286,257 (2011 Turkish Cypriot census)	300,000-500,000 (includes Turkish Cypriots and recent Turkish settlers)	According to Article 2(2) of the 1985 constitution of the Turkish Republic of Northern Cyprus, which is only recognised by Turkey, the Turkish language is the sole official language of the break-away state.	Turkish Cypriots

=== Turkish "communities" ===
Country	Official State census figures	Other estimates	Constitution recognition	See also
Cyprus	1,128 (2011 Cypriot Census)	2,000 Turkish Cypriots remain in the internationally recognized southern region of the Republic of Cyprus.	Under Article 2 of the Cypriot constitution the Turkish Cypriots, alongside the Greek Cypriots, form one of the two "Communities" in Cyprus. The Turkish Cypriots are therefore recognised as equal participants of the Republic rather than as a minority. Furthermore, under Article 3, the Greek and Turkish languages are the two official languages of Cyprus. Despite President Makarios III's attempt to amend the constitution and the aim to weaken the rights of Turkish Cypriots, under the 1963 Akritas plan, the original 1960 constitution is still legally in force today.	Turkish Cypriots

=== Turkish minorities ===
==== Turkish minorities in the Balkans ====
Map of the Turkish population in Bulgaria. According to the 2011 Bulgarian census the Turks make up a majority in the Kardzhali Province (66.2%) and the Razgrad Province (50.02%).

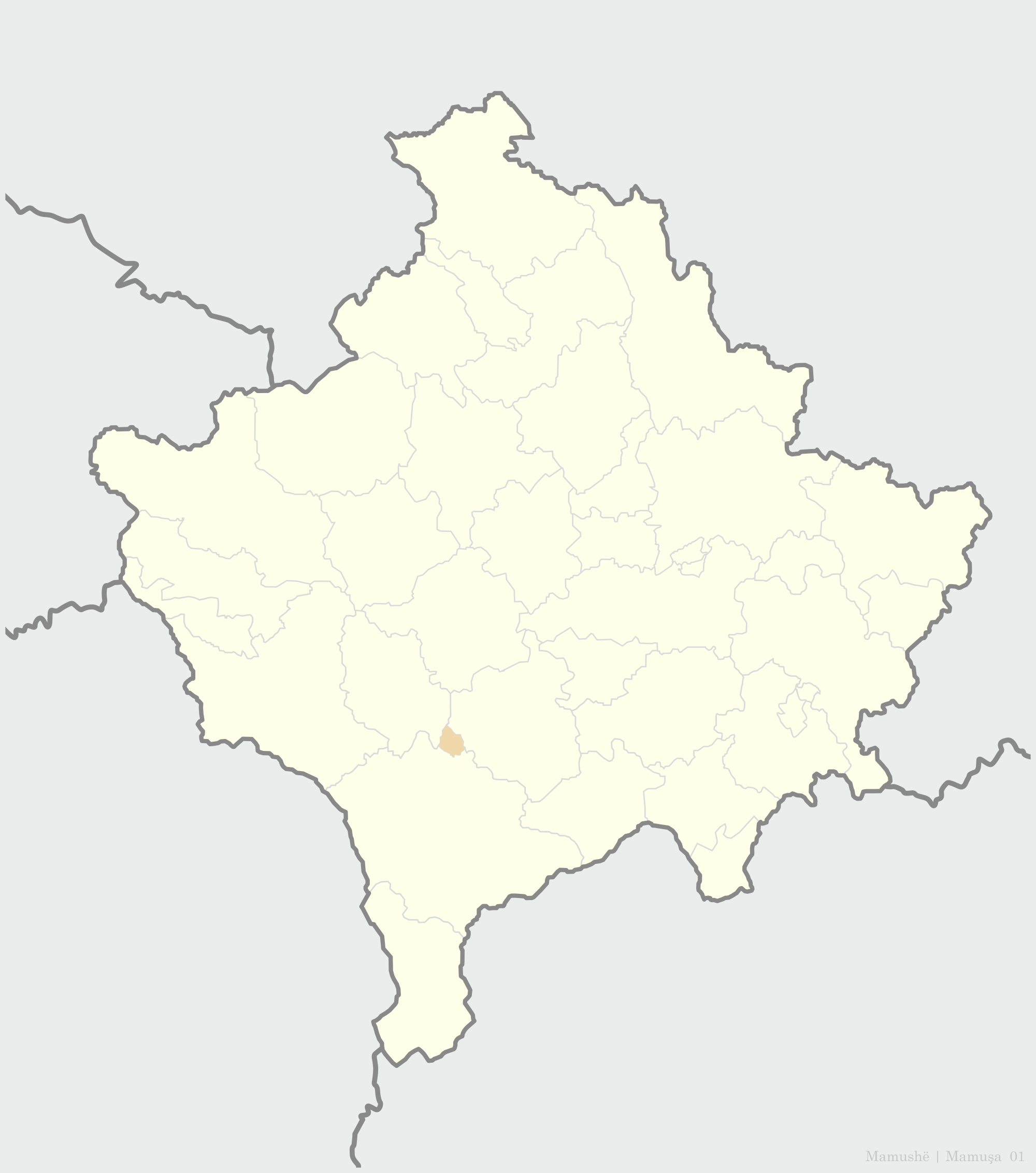
According to the 2011 census of Kosovo the Turks make up a majority in Mamuša (93.1%).

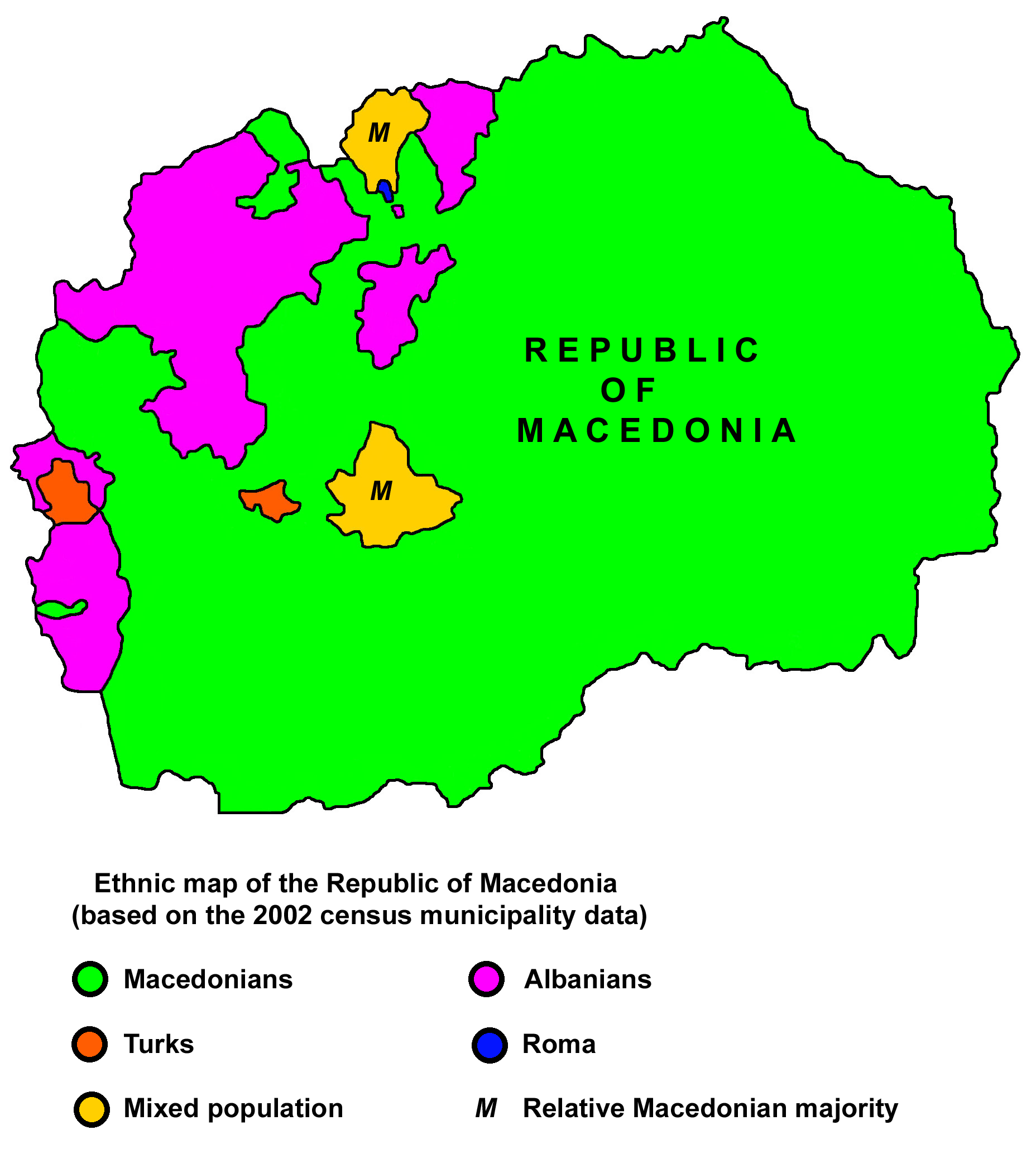
According to the 2002 census of the Republic of Macedonia the Turks make up a majority in the Centar Župa Municipality (80.2%) and the Plasnica Municipality (97.8%).

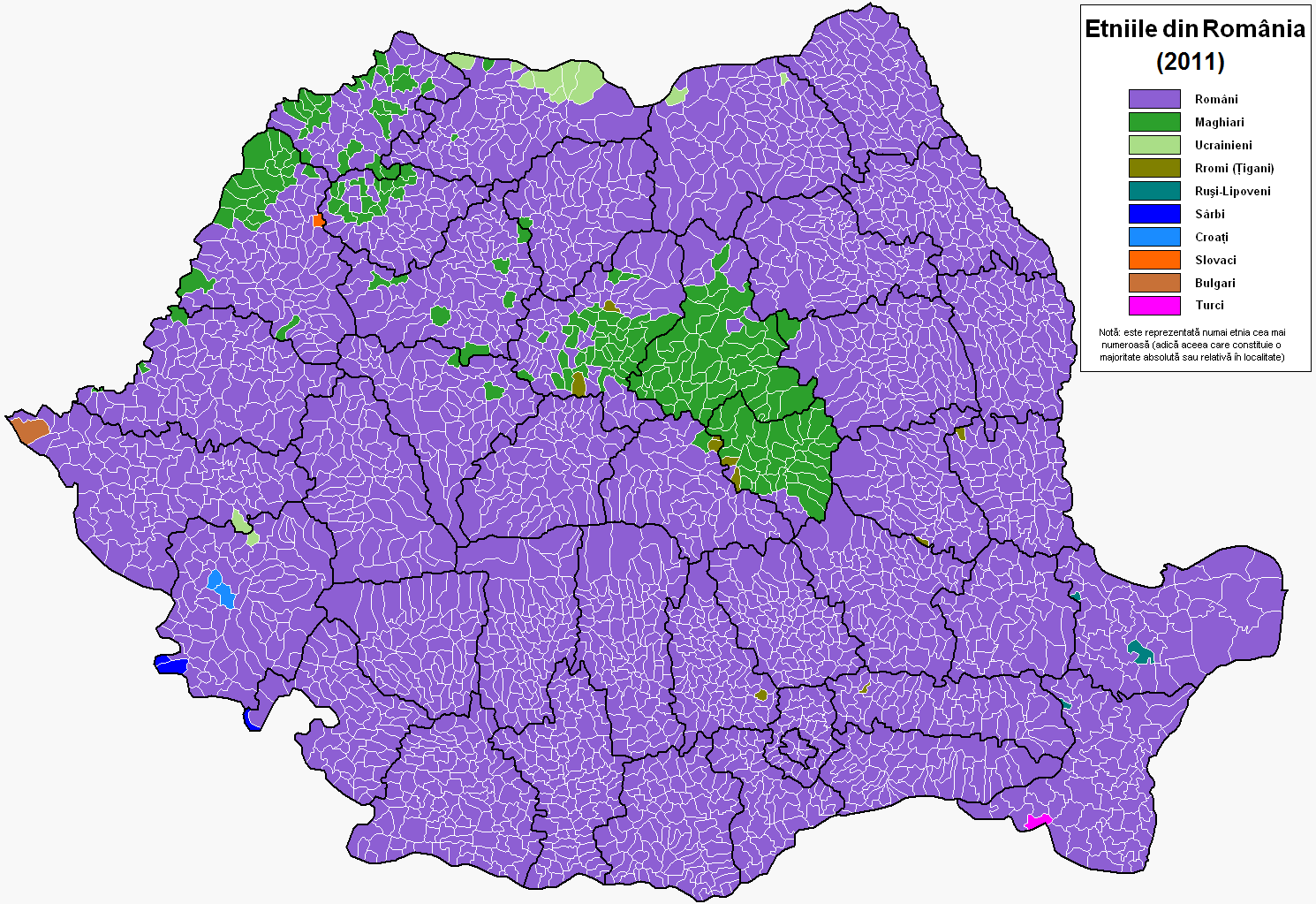
According to the 2011 census of Romania the Turks make up a majority in Dobromir (61.93%) located in the Constanța County.

Country	Official State census figures	Other estimates	Constitutional recognition/Minority status	Further information	Lists of Turks by country
Bosnia and Herzegovina	267 (1991 Bosnian census)	50,000	The Turkish language is officially recognized as a minority language, in accordance with the European Charter for Regional or Minority Languages, under Article 2, paragraph 2, of the 2010 ratification.	Turks in Bosnia and Herzegovina	
Bulgaria	588,318 (2011 Bulgarian census)	750,000	The Bulgarian constitution of 1991 does not mention any ethnic minorities and the Bulgarian language is the sole official language of the State. However, in accordance with Article 36(2), the Turkish minority has the right to study their own language alongside the compulsory study of the Bulgarian language. Moreover, under Article 54(1), the Turkish minority have the right to "develop their culture in accordance with his ethnic identification".	Turks in Bulgaria	List of Bulgarian Turks
Croatia	367 (2011 Croatian census)	2,000	The Turks are officially recognised as a minority ethnic group, in accordance with the 2010 Constitution of Croatia.	Turks in Croatia	
Greece	179,895 (1951 Greek census)	150,000 (80,000 to 130,000 in Western Thrace, 10,000 to 15,000 in Athens, 5,000 in Rhodes and Kos, and 5,000 in Thessaloniki)	The Turks of Western Thrace have protected status to practice their religion and use the Turkish language, in accordance with the 1923 Treaty of Lausanne. However, the other sizeable Turkish minorities in Greece have no official recognition.	Turks in Greece	
Kosovo	18,738 (2011 Kosovar census)	30,000 to 50,000	The Turkish language is recognized as an official language in the municipalities of Prizren and Mamusha and has minority status in Gjilan, Pristina, Vushtrri, and Mitrovica.	Turks in Kosovo	
Republic of Macedonia	77,959 (2002 Macedonian census)	170,000–200,000	Initially the 1988 draft constitution spoke of the "state of the Macedonian people and the Albanian and Turkish minority". Once the 1991 constitution came into force the Turkish language was used officially where Turks formed a majority in the Centar Župa Municipality and the Plasnica Municipality. Since the 2001 amendment to the constitution, the Turkish language is officially used where Turks form at least 20% of the population and hence it is also an official language of Mavrovo and Rostuša.	Turks in Macedonia	
Montenegro	104 (2011 Montenegrin census).			Turks in Montenegro	
Romania	28,226 (2011 Romanian census)	55,000 to 80,000	The Turkish language is officially recognized as a minority language, in accordance with the European Charter for Regional or Minority Languages, under Part III of the 2007 ratification.	Turks in Romania	
Serbia	647 (2011 Serbian census)			Turks in Serbia	
Total	N/A	1,300,000 (2011 estimate)		Turks in the Balkans	

==== Turkish minorities in the Caucasus ====
The Meskheti region of Georgia had the largest Turkish population in Caucasus prior to the Second World War. In 1944 Joseph Stalin deported the Meskhetian Turkish minority to other parts of the Soviet Union, where they now form a large diaspora.

Country	Official State census figures	Other estimates	Constitutional recognition/ Minority status	Further information	Lists of Turks by country
Abkhazia	731 (2011 Abkhazian census)	15,000		Turks in Abkhazia	
Armenia	Turkish minority N/A. Although the Soviet censuses recorded a small number of Turks, 19 in 1970, 28 in 1979, and 13 in 1989, they were not recorded in the 2001 Armenian census.			Turks in Armenia	
Azerbaijan	Turkish minority N/A. The 2009 Azerbaijani census recorded 38,000 Turks; however, it does not distinguish between the Turkish minority (descendants of Ottoman settlers who remained in Azerbaijan), Meskhetian Turks who arrived after 1944, and recent Turkish arrivals.	19,000 (Descendants of Ottomans settlers who remained in Azerbaijan only. This does not include the much larger Meskhetian Turkish and mainland Turkish arrivals who form a part of the diaspora)		Turks in Azerbaijan	
Georgia	*Pre-World War II: 137,921 (1926 Soviet Census). The Turkish population was not recorded in later censuses; nonetheless, it is estimated that 200,000 Meskhetian Turks were deported to Central Asia in 1944. *Post-World War II: The Meskhetian Turk population in the USSR was published for the first in the 1970 census. However, by this point, the Turkish minority in Georgia had already diminished to several hundred due to the forced deportation of 1944. There were 853 Turks in Georgia in 1970, 917 in 1979, and 1,375 in 1989. *Post-USSR: Although a small number of Meskhetian Turks have returned to Georgia, they were not recorded in the 2002 Georgian census.	1,500		Meskhetian Turks	

==== Turkish minorities in the Levant ====
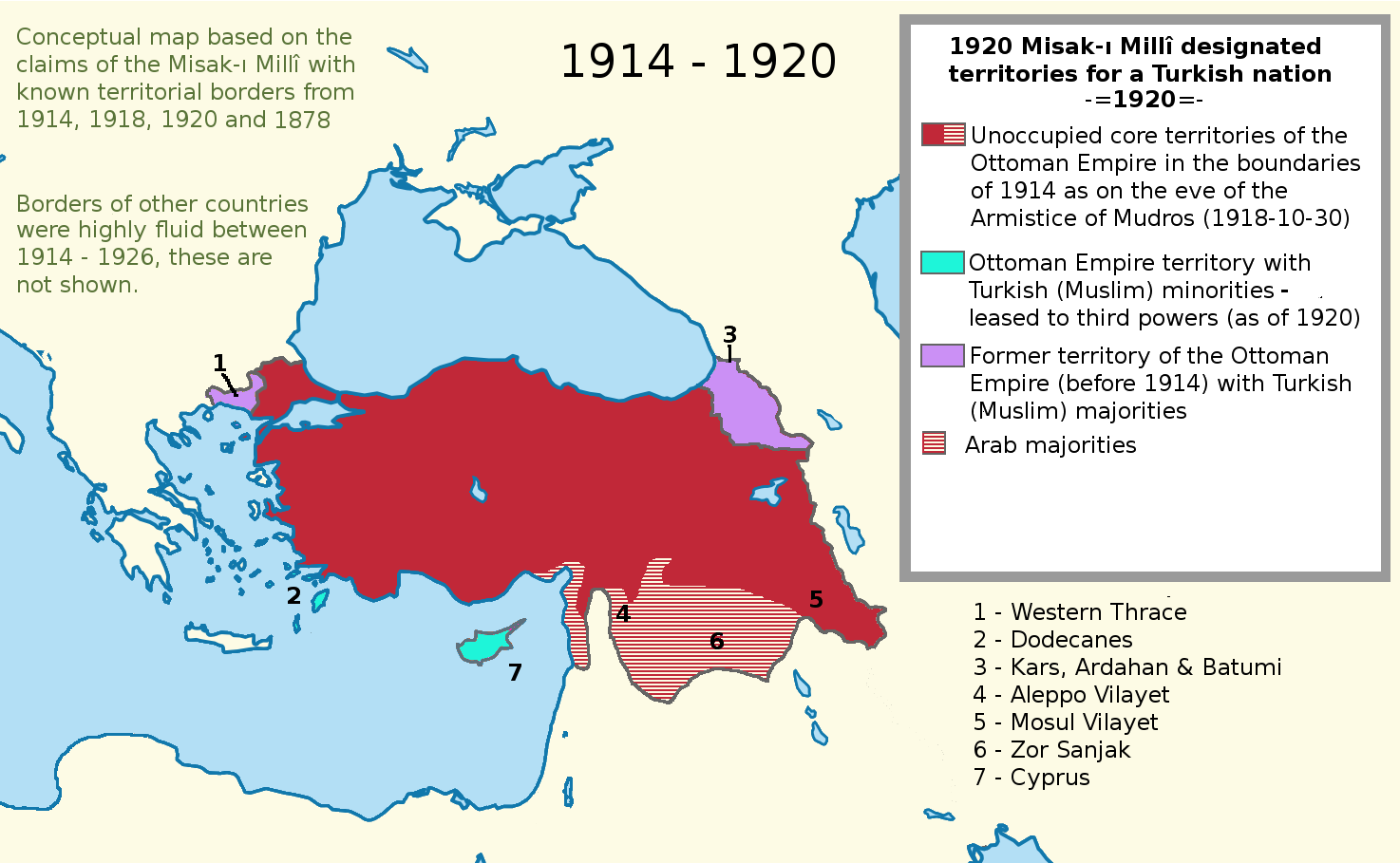
The Misak-ı Millî ("national oath") sought to include Turkish majority areas in the Mosul Vilayet (in Iraq) and the Aleppo Vilayet and the Zor Sanjak (in Syria) in the proposals for the new borders of a Turkish nation in 1920.

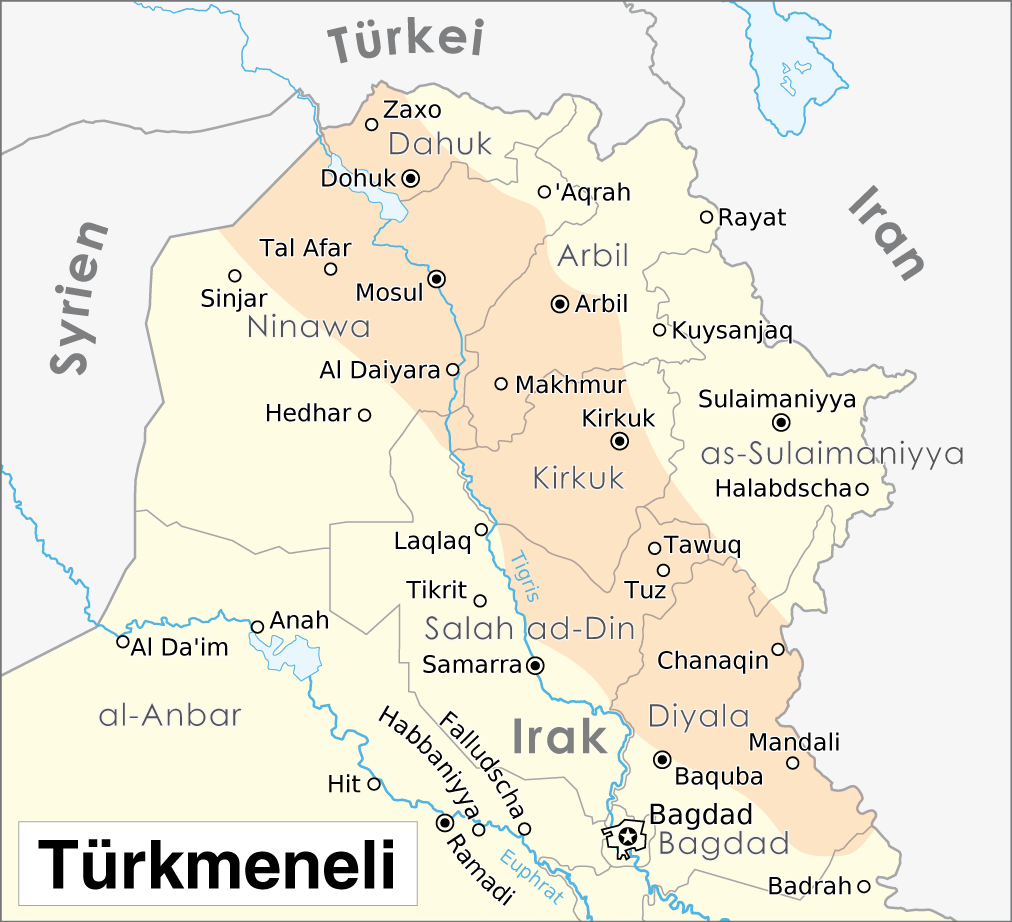
The majority of Iraqi Turks live in the so-called "Turkmeneli" region.

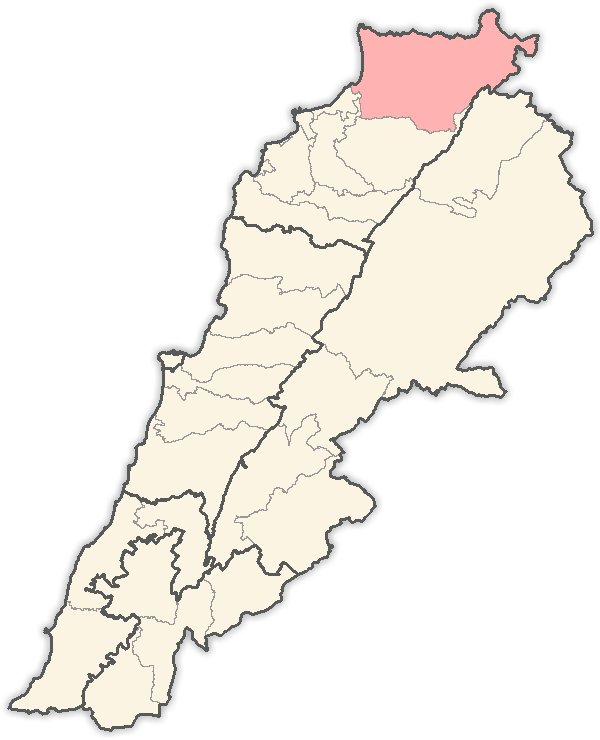
Turkish people form a majority in Kouachra and Aydamun, in the Akkar District of Lebanon.

Country	Census figures	Alternate estimates	Legal recognition	Further information	Lists of Turks by country
Iraq	567,000 or 9% of the total Iraqi population (1957 census)	3,000,000 (Iraqi Ministry of Planning estimate, 2013)	In 1925 the Turks were recognised as a constitutive entity of Iraq, alongside the Arabs and Kurds, however, the minority were later denied this status. In 1997 the Iraqi Turkoman Congress adopted a Declaration of Principles, Article Three of which states the following: "The official written language of the Turkomans is Istanbul Turkish, and its alphabet is the new Latin alphabet."	Iraqi Turkmens	List of Iraqi Turks
Israel	55,700	280,000	N/A	Turks in Israel	
Jordan	N/A	Turkish minority: Palestinian-Turkish refugees: 55,000 in Irbid; 5,000 near Amman; 5,000 in El-Sahne; 3,000 in El-Reyyan; 2,500 in El-Bakaa; 1,500 in El-Zerkaa; 1,500 in Sahab	N/A	Turks in Jordan	List of Jordanian Turks
Lebanon	N/A	80,000 (plus 125,000 to 150,000 Syrian Turkmen refugees)	N/A	Turks in Lebanon	List of Lebanese Turks
Palestine	N/A	est. West Bank: 35,000 to 40,000 total Palestinian-Turkish community: est.400,000 to 500,000	N/A	Turks in Palestine	
Syria	N/A	500,000–3.5 million	N/A	Syrian Turkmens	List of Syrian Turks

==== Turkish minorities in North Africa ====
Country	Census figures	Alternate estimates	Legal recognition	Further information	Lists of Turks by country
Algeria	N/A	No reliable estimate nowadays, however, the population was estimated at 20,000 (1,07%) Turks out of a total population of 1,870,000 Algerians in 1830 before the French invasion which then led to the departure of many Turks	N/A	Turks in Algeria	List of Algerian Turks
Egypt	N/A	1 to 1.2 million plus 100,000 Cretan Turks	N/A	Turks in Egypt	List of Egyptian Turks
Libya	35,062 or 4.7% of Libya's population (1936 census)	1,500,000 plus 100,000 Cretan Turks	N/A	Turks in Libya	List of Libyan Turks
Tunisia	N/A	Up to 25% of Tunisia's population. Estimates: 500,000–2,000,000.	N/A	Turks in Tunisia	List of Tunisian Turks

=== Other Arab countries ===
Country	Census figures	Alternate estimates	Legal recognition	Further information	Lists of Turks by country
Saudi Arabia	N/A	150,000	N/A	Turks in Saudi Arabia	List of Saudi Arabian Turks
Yemen	N/A	10,000 to 100,000 or more than 200,000	N/A	Turks in Yemen	List of Yemeni Turks

== Turkish diasporas ==
=== Central Asia ===
Country	Official State census figures	Other estimates	Further information	Lists of Turks
Kazakhstan	97,015 (2009 Kazakh census)	150,000)-180,000 (Meskhetian Turks only)	Turks in Kazakhstan	
Kyrgyzstan	38,878 (2009 Kyrgyz census)	50,000 to 70,000 (Meskhetian Turks only)	Turks in Kyrgyzstan	
Tajikistan	1,360 (2010 Tajik census)		Turks in Tajikistan	
Turkmenistan	13,000 (2012 Turkmen census)		Turks in Turkmenistan	
Uzbekistan	106,302 (1989 Uzbek census)	15,000-38,000 (Meskhetian Turks only)	Turks in Uzbekistan	

=== Europe ===
In 2010 Boris Kharkovsky from the Center for Ethnic and Political Science Studies said that there was up to 15 million Turks living in the European Union. According to Dr Araks Pashayan ten million "Euro-Turks" alone were living in Germany, France, the Netherlands and Belgium in 2012. In addition, there are also significant Turkish communities living in Austria, the UK, Switzerland, Italy, Liechtenstein and the Scandinavian countries.

Turks make up the largest ethnic minority group in Austria, Denmark, Germany and the Netherlands.

Country	State census figures on Turkish ethnicity	Other estimates	Further information	Lists of Turks
Austria	N/A; The Austrian census does not collect data on ethnicity.	360,000 (2011 est. by the Initiative Minderheiten); 400,000 (2010 est. by Ariel Muzicant); 500,000 (est. by Andreas Mölzer)	Turks in Austria	List of Austrian Turks
Belarus	55 (1989 Belarusian Census)			
Belgium	N/A; The Belgian census does not collect data on ethnicity.	Over 200,000 (2012 estimate by Professor Raymond Taras); 250,000 (2019 estimate by Dr Altay Manço and Dr Ertugrul Taş)	Turks in Belgium	List of Belgian Turks
Czech Republic		1,700	Turks in the Czech Republic	
Denmark	N/A; The Danish census does not collect data on ethnicity.	70,000 (2008 estimate by the Danish Broadcasting Corporation)	Turks in Denmark	
Estonia	544 (2011 Estonian census)			
Finland		10,000 (2010 estimate by Professor Zeki Kütük)	Turks in Finland	
France	594,000 (2020)	1,000,000 (2010 estimate by Dr Jean-Gustave Hentz and Dr Michel Hasselmann) to over 1,000,000	Turks in France	List of French Turks
Germany	2,162,000 (2024)	at least 4,000,000 to over 7,000,000	Turks in Germany	List of German Turks
Hungary	1,565 (2001 Hungarian census)	2,500	Turks in Hungary	
Iceland		68		
Ireland	N/A; The Irish census does not collect data on ethnicity.	3,000	Turks in Ireland	
Italy	N/A; The Italian census does not collect data on ethnicity.	30,000–50,000 (excluding the Turkish minority in Moena)	Turks in Italy	
Latvia		142	lv:Turki Latvijā	
Liechtenstein		1,000	Turks in Liechtenstein	
Lithuania		35		
Luxembourg		450		
Malta		53		
Moldova			Turks in Moldova	
Monaco		57		
Netherlands	N/A; The Dutch census does not collect data on ethnicity.	500,000 to 2,000,000	Turks in the Netherlands	List of Dutch people of Turkish descent
Norway	N/A; The Norwegian census does not collect data on ethnicity.	16,000	Turks in Norway	
Poland		5,000 (2013 estimate from the Institute of Public Affairs, Poland)	Turks in Poland	
Portugal		1,363 (excluding naturalized citizens and people of Turkish origin)		
Russia	Recorded 105,058 Turks and 4,825 Meskhetian Turks (2010 Russian census)	120,000–150,000	Turks in Russia	
Slovakia		150		
Slovenia	259 (2002 Slovenian census)			
Spain	N/A; The Spanish census does not collect data on ethnicity.	4,000	Turks in Spain	
Sweden	N/A; The Swedish census does not collect data on ethnicity.	100,000 (2009 estimate by the Swedish Ministry for Foreign Affairs); 150,000 (2018 estimate by the Swedish Consul General)	Turks in Sweden	
Switzerland	N/A; The Swiss census does not collect data on ethnicity.	100,000-120,000	Turks in Switzerland	List of Swiss Turks
Ukraine	8,844 Turks and 336 Meskhetian Turks (2001 Ukrainian census)	10,000 (Meskhetian Turks only)	Turks in Ukraine	
United Kingdom	N/A	500,000 (including 300,000–350,000 Turkish Cypriots)	Turks in the United Kingdom	List of British Turks

=== North America ===
Country	Official State census figures	Other estimates	Further information	Lists of Turks
Canada	63,955 (2016 Canadian census)	100,000 (2018 est. by Canadian Ambassador Chris Cooter); Over 100,000; Plus 1,800 Turkish Cypriots	Turkish Canadians	List of Turkish Canadians
United States	230,342 (2016 American Community Survey estimate)	More than 1,000,000 (2012 estimate by the former United States Secretary of Commerce John Bryson)	Turkish Americans	List of Turkish Americans

=== Oceania ===
Country	Official State census figures	Other estimates	Further information	Lists of Turks
Australia	66,919 (2011 census)	150,000 to 200,000; Plus 40,000–120,000 Turkish Cypriots	Turkish Australians	List of Turkish Australians
New Zealand	957 (2013 census)	2,000–3,000; Plus 1,600 Turkish Cypriots	Turks in New Zealand	

=== Other regions ===
Country	Official State census figures	Other estimates	Further information	Lists of Turks by country
India	N/A. The Indian census collects data on country of birth but does not collect data on ethnicity. but Turk peoples in India Have their organisation to protect their culture, they are mainly reside in the area of west Uttar Pradesh (state) consisting district of Moradabad, Sambhal, Amroha, Rampur, Turks are in majority in Sambhal town about 50%–60%	2,000	Turks in India	
Pakistan		400	Turks in Pakistan	
Peru		12,000		
Brazil		6,300		
