= Demographics of the Arab world =

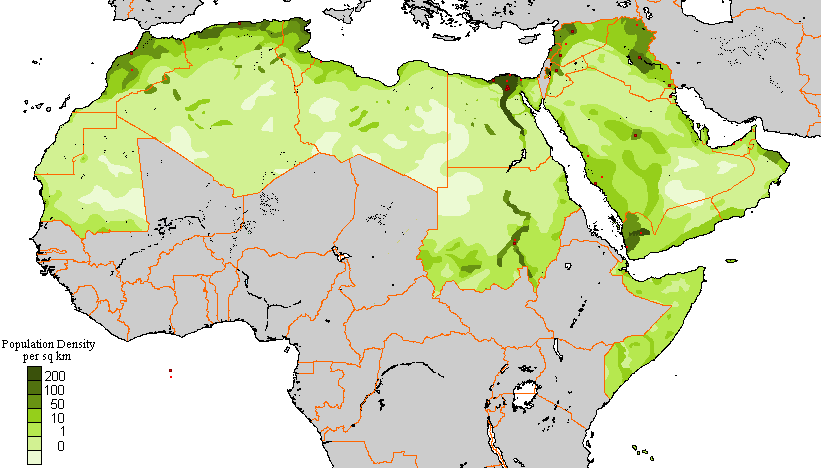
Population density of the Arab League countries.

The Arab world consists of 19 countries in the Middle East and North Africa region. All of them are members of the Arab League, in addition to three non-Arab countries of Comoros, Djibouti, and Somalia. As of 2026, the combined population of all the Arab League states was around 450 million people, which includes non-Arab ethnicities in Arab-majority countries, such as Arabic-speaking Sudanese and Mauritanians (who often self-identify as Arabs), as well as Nubians.

The most populous Arab state is Egypt, with a population of 109 million residents. Comoros is the least populated, with around 821,625 inhabitants. Cairo, Egypt is the Arab world's largest city.

== Population growth ==
As estimated in 2023, the Arab world's population was approximately 473 million inhabitants; however, exact figures of the annual population growth, fertility rate, or mortality rate are unknown.

More than 59 percent of the Arab population is concentrated in urban areas, and the number is expected to reach 68 percent by 2050.

The majority of Arabs are Muslims, with Christians being the largest religious-minority group. Arab countries host several holy cities and religiously significant sites, including Alexandria, Mecca, Medina, Kirkuk, Arbil, and Baghdad. Sunni Muslims constitute the vast majority of the Arab world's peoples. Shia Muslims comprise the slight majority in certain areas of Iraq, and nearly 50 percent the population in Bahrain.

Christianity is the Arab world's second largest religion, with more than 20 million Christians in total living in such countries as Lebanon, Egypt, Iraq, Jordan, Syria, Kuwait, and Bahrain.

The Maghreb is home to longstanding Jewish populations, mainly in Morocco and Tunisia. Such countries as Algeria, Egypt, Iraq, Syria, and Yemen also have historic Jewish populations. Since antiquity, the Maghrebi Jews have lived in Morocco, Algeria, and Tunisia.

During the decades following Israel's establishment in 1948, most Arab Jews and Maghrebi Jews have emigrated from Arab countries to the State of Israel, and to lesser extents, Western Europe and the Americas. Other minority religions such as the Druze religion, the Baháʼí Faith, Mandeanism, Yazdanism, Zoroastrianism, the Shabak religion, and Yarsan are practiced on far smaller scales.

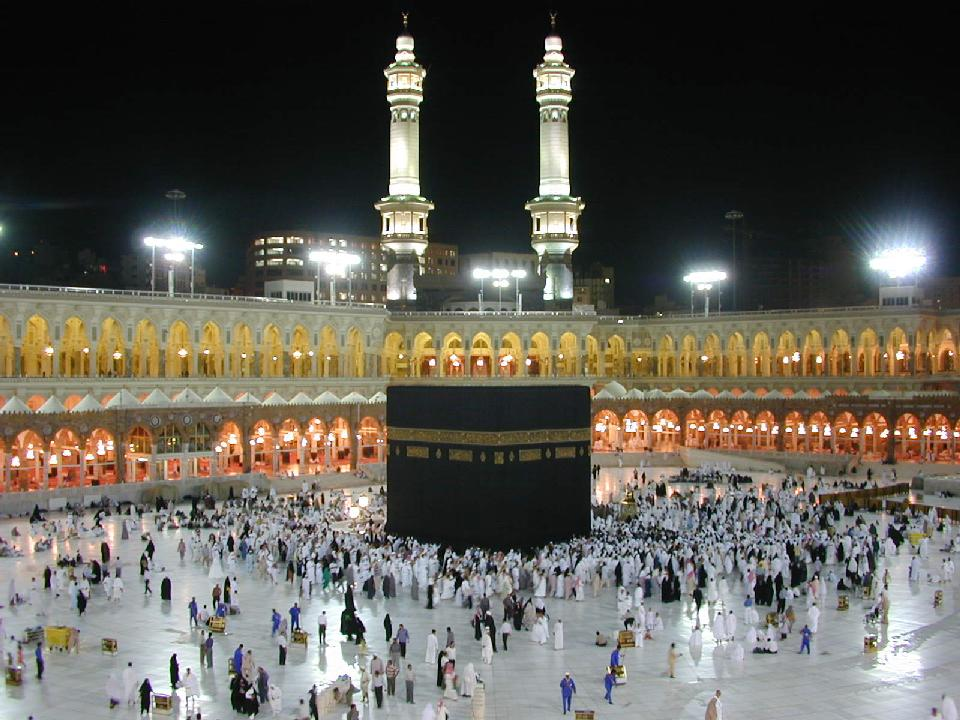
The holiest place in Islam, the Kaaba, is located in Saudi Arabia.

Arab League countries by religion (percentage of population, as of 2010)
Country	Muslims	Christians	Others
Arab League	93%	5%	2%
Algeria	98.67%	<2%	<1%
Bahrain	74.1%	13.67%	12.2%
Comoros	98.67%	<1%	<1%
Djibouti	96.67%	2.23%	1.1%
Egypt	95.67%	4.33%	<1%
Iraq	98.67%	<2%	<1%
Jordan	91.67%	2.2%	<1%
Kuwait	81.67%	11.1%	10.2%
Lebanon	67.8%	27.9%	4.3%
Libya	98.67%	<1%	<1%
Mauritania	98.2%	<1%	<1%
Morocco	98.67%	<1%	<1%
Oman	81.67%	18.13%	1.2%
Qatar	75.69%	12.64%	11.67%
Palestine	96.67%	2.33%	<1.1%
Saudi Arabia	93.67%	5.3%	2.1%
Somalia	98.67%	<1%	<1%
Sudan	98.67%	13.3%	<1%
Syria	94.2%	3.8%	2%
Tunisia	98.3%	<1.7%	<1%
United Arab Emirates	72.9%	14.3%	12.8%
Yemen	98.67%	<1%	<1%
Arab League	93%	5%	2%

== Languages ==
In general, Modern Standard Arabic (MSA) is the official language in the Arab world, but additional languages are often used in the daily lives of some citizens. Arabs, however, don't natively speak MSA but their native varieties of Arabic, which are grouped based on shared features into Peninsular, Mesopotamian, Levantine, Egyptian, and Maghrebi. Currently, three major non-Arabic languages are widely used: Kurdish (in northern Iraq and parts of Syria), Berber (in North Africa), and Somali (in the Horn of Africa).

There are several minority languages that are still spoken today, such as Afar, Armenian, Hebrew, Nubian, Persian, Aramaic, and Turkish. Twenty percent of the Arab population natively speak a non-Arabic language, most commonly, Somali, Berber and Kurdish languages.

== Populations ==
Many Arab countries in the Persian Gulf have sizable non-Arab populations. Iraq, Bahrain, Kuwait, Qatar, United Arab Emirates and Oman have a Persian speaking minority. The same countries also have Urdu speakers and Filipinos as sizable minority. Balochi speakers are a good size minority in Oman. Additionally, countries like: Bahrain, UAE, Oman and Kuwait have significant non-Arab and non-Muslim minorities (11–21%) like Hindus and Christians from Indian-Sub continent: Bangladesh; Nepal; Pakistan; and the Philippines. Many non-Arab countries bordering the Arab states have large numbers of Arab people, such as in Burkino Faso, Chad, Eritrea, Comoros, Somalia, Djibouti, Mali, Malta, Senegal and Turkey.

The Table below shows the distribution of populations in the Arab world, as well as the official language(s) within the various Arab states.

Arab state	Population	% Arabs	Official language(s)	Notes
Algeria	44,903,225	85%	Arabic co-official language with Amazigh.	
Bahrain	1,733,100		Arabic official language.	
Egypt	121,069,001	91.93%	Arabic official language; co-official with Egyptian.	1942 – Egypt; & Israel; Turkey and United Kingdom promoted the idea of the Arab League states.
Iraq	46,081,677	75–85%	Arabic official language with Kurdish.	
Jordan	10,255,045	97.6%	Arabic official language.	
Kuwait	4,268,873		Arabic official language.	
Lebanon	6,810,123	95%	Arabic official language.	
Libya	6,244,174	92%	Arabic official language.	
Mauritania	3,516,806	70%	Arabic official language. (Note: Pulaar, Wolof and Soninke are recognised as national languages together with Arabic by the 1991 Constitution of Mauritania.)	
Morocco	37,457,971	69%	Arabic co-official language with Amazigh.	
Oman	5,174,814		Arabic official language.	
Palestine	5,163,462	91.2%	Arabic co-official with Hebrew.	WB: 2,731,052 (83% PLS Arabs); GS: 1,816,379 (98% PLS Arabs)
Qatar	2,906,257		Arabic official language.	
Saudi Arabia	36,408,820		Arabic official language.	1945 – Leaders of seven States in the Middle East signed the “Alexandria” Protocol, thus establishing the first Organization with a Pan-Arabism ideology in the 20th century.
Sudan	46,874,204	70%	Arabic co-official language with English.	
Syria	17,723,461	90%	Arabic official language.	
Tunisia	12,356,117	98%	Arabic official language.	
United Arab Emirates	10,102,678		Arabic official language.	
Yemen	32,168,998	92.8	Arabic official language.	

=== Armenians ===
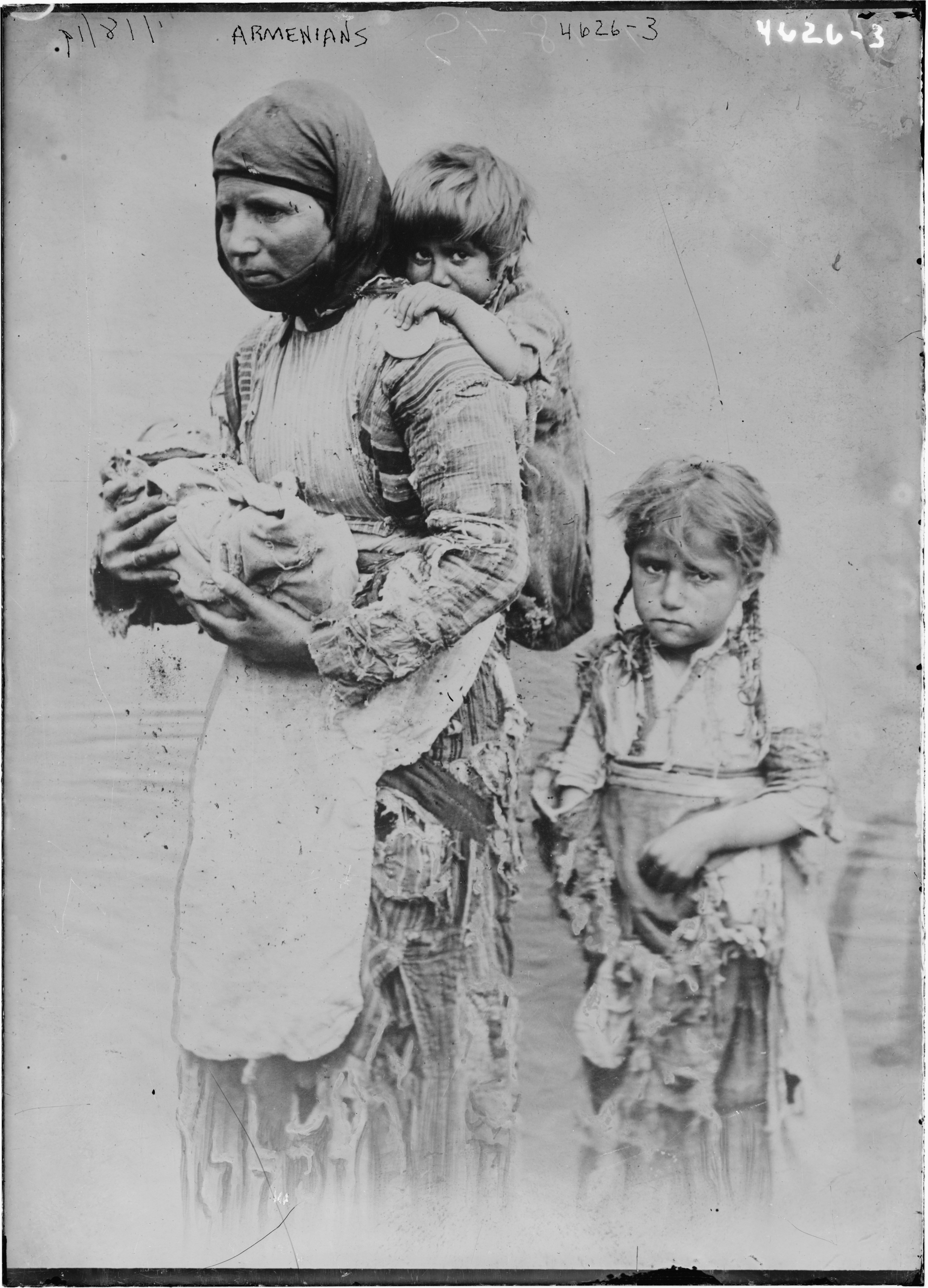
Armenian refugees after the Hamidian massacres. A lot of them settled in Syria, Lebanon, Palestine, and Egypt

The Arab world has between 400,000 and 500,000 Armenians inhabiting its geographical area. Armenians are largely concentrated in countries such as Lebanon (150,000 to 250,000) and Syria (100,000 to 150,000) as well as Palestine, and to a lesser degree Egypt and Iraq, but Armenians can also be found in countries like Qatar and the UAE. These Armenians are economic migrants from Lebanon and Syria.

Prior to World War I, there were some 2,000–3,000 Armenians in Palestine, mostly in Jerusalem. From 1915 and onward, thousands of Armenian genocide survivors from Cilicia (Adana Vilayet) found refuge, and settled in Palestine, increasing its Armenian population. In 1925, around 15,000 Armenians are believed to have lived in all of Palestine, with the majority in Jerusalem. During Mandatory Palestine period, the number of Armenians is estimated to have reached up to 20,000. However, the 1931 British census showed only 3,524 Armenians in all of Palestine.

A large number of Armenian monks are recorded to have settled in Jerusalem as early as the 4th century, after the uncovering of Christian holy places in the city. However, the first written records are from the 5th century. Jerusalem is thus considered the oldest living diaspora community outside the Armenian homeland. Nowadays, there are estimated 7500 living in the region of Historical Palestine.

Most Armenians are Christians mainly following the Orthodox Armenian Apostolic Church. The church has one of its two headquarters in Antelias, Lebanon, called The Catholicosate of the Great House of Cilicia (the other being in Armenia called Mother See of Holy Etchmiadzin). There are also Armenian Catholics. The world headquarters of the Armenian Catholic Church is also located in Beirut, Lebanon (and historically in Bzoummar, Lebanon). There are also a minority Armenian Evangelical Protestants. The Middle East headquarters of the Armenian Evangelical Church is in Beirut called Union of the Armenian Evangelical Churches in the Near East.

=== Assyrians ===
Assyrians (also known as Chaldo-Assyrians) can be found in Iraq, north eastern Syria, and to a lesser degree north western Iran and south eastern Turkey. They are an ancient Semitic people who retain Aramaic as a spoken language. They are exclusively Christian and are descendants of the ancient pre Arab Assyrians/Mesopotamians. Almost all Christians in Iraq are ethnic Assyrians, where they number approximately 400,000. 500,000 are in Syria but are harder to identify, because they are often included in with the general Christian population and speak Arabic, however the Christians of the Tur Abdin and Al Hasakah regions in the north east are predominantly Assyrian.

=== Berbers ===
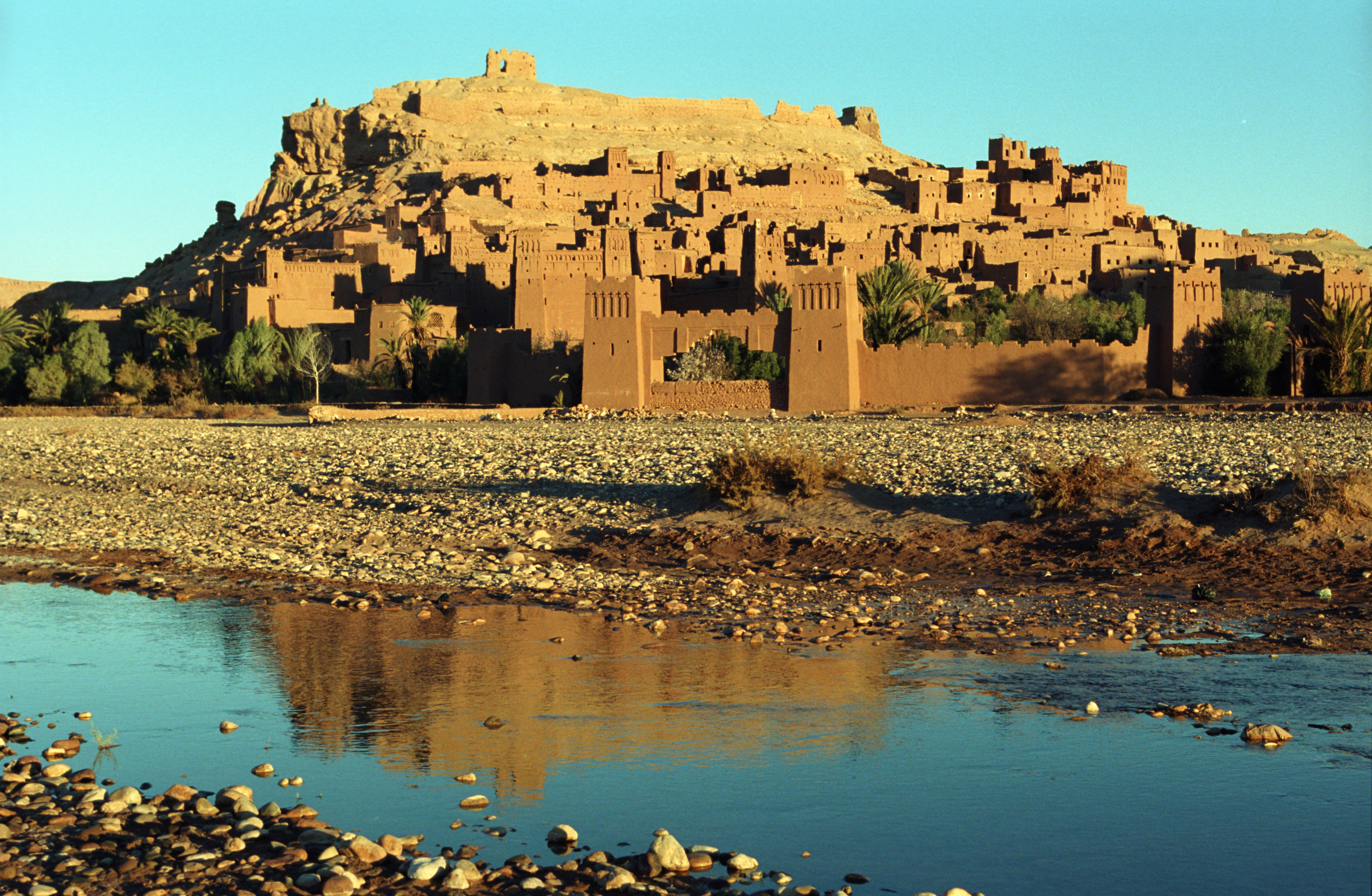
The town of Aït Benhaddou is a typical desert Amazigh town; the Berbers (Amazigh) are the largest non-Arab ethnicity in the Arab world.

Berbers are an ethnic group indigenous to North Africa. They are distributed in an area stretching from the Atlantic Ocean to the Siwa Oasis in Egypt, and from the Mediterranean Sea to the Niger River. Historically, they spoke Berber languages, which together form the Berber branch of the Afro-Asiatic family. Since the Muslim conquest of North Africa in the seventh century, a large number of Berbers inhabiting the Maghreb have acquired different degrees of knowledge of varieties of Maghrebi Arabic.

=== Circassians ===
Circassians are a people who originate in the North Caucasus. They are predominantly Muslim, and can be found in Iraq, Syria, Jordan, Israel, Lebanon and Egypt in relatively small numbers.

=== Coptic Christians ===
Egyptian Coptic Christians are a religious group who do not usually identify themselves as Arabic and they follow the Coptic Orthodox Church. They place heavy emphasis on the Egyptian aspect of their identity and their Christian heritage. Their numbers are heavily disputed but are estimated to compromise roughly 5.35% of the Egyptian population. They are mainly followers of the Coptic Orthodox Church of Alexandria, there are however a minority among them who are members of the Coptic Catholic Church, and an even smaller group who belong to the Coptic Evangelical Church. The Egyptian Coptic language, which is a late script that was developed in Roman Egypt, written in the Greek alphabet and descending from the late form of the Egyptian language of ancient Egypt, continues to be used as the liturgical language of the Coptic Orthodox Church of Alexandria.

=== Jews ===
The Jewish tribes of Arabia were Arabian tribes professing the Jewish faith that inhabited the Arabian Peninsula before and during the advent of Islam. It is not always clear whether they were originally Israelite in ancestry, genealogically Arab tribes that converted to Judaism, or a mixture of both. In Islamic tradition the Jewish tribes of the Hejaz were seen as the offspring of the ancient Israelites. According to Muslim sources, they spoke a language other than Arabic, which Al-Tabari claims was Persian. This implies they were connected to the major Jewish center in Babylon. Certain Jewish traditions records the existence of nomadic tribes such as the Rechabites that converted to Judaism in antiquity. The tribes collapsed with the rise of Islam, with many either converting or fleeing the Arab peninsula. Some of those tribes are thought to have merged into Yemenite Jewish community, while others, like the residents of Yatta consider themselves Islamized descendants of Khaybar, a Jewish tribe of Arabia.

Jews from Arab countries – included in the Mizrahi Jewish communities– are not categorized as, and do not consider themselves to be, Arabs, as Jews are a separate nation from Arabs, with different history and culture. However, sometimes the term Arab Jews is used to describe Jews from Arab countries, though the term is highly controversial. Sociologist Sammy Smooha stated "This ("Arab Jews") term does not hold water. It is absolutely not a parallel to 'Arab Christian'". Those who dispute the historicity of the term make the claim that Middle Eastern Jews are similar to Assyrians, Berbers, and other Middle Eastern groups who live in Arab societies as distinct minority groups with distinct identity and therefore are not categorized as Arabs.

=== Kurds ===
In the northern regions of Iraq (15–20%) and Syria (10%) live a group called the Kurds, an Indo-European, indigenous ethnic group who speak Kurdish, a language closely related to Persian and using Persian alphabet, except in Turkey where Kurdish is written using a Latin alphabet orthography. The majority of Kurds are Sunni Muslim, others are Alevi Muslim, with Christian and Yarsan minorities. The nationalist aspiration for self-rule or for a state of Kurdistan has created conflict between Kurdish minorities and their governments in Iraq, Iran, Syria and Turkey.

=== Mandaeans ===
Mandaeans, sometimes also called Sabians, are a people found mainly in southern Iraq. Their numbers total no more than 70,000. They follow Mandaeism, a gnostic religion.

=== Mhallami ===
Mhallami are a tiny minority of unknown origins who have converted to Islam.

=== Nubians ===
Nubians, found in Northern Sudan and Southern Egypt, are a different ethnicity from their northern and southern neighbors in Egypt and Sudan, numbering 1.7 million in Sudan and Egypt. The Nubian people in Sudan inhabit the region between Wadi Halfa in the north and Al Dabbah in the south. The main Nubian groups from north to south are the Halfaweyen, Sikut (Sickkout), Mahas, and Danagla. They speak different dialects of the Nubian language.

Ancient Nubians were famous for their vast wealth, their trade between Central Africa and the lower Nile valley civilizations, including Egypt, their skill and precision with the bow, their 23-letter alphabet, the use of deadly poison on the heads of their arrows, their great military, their advanced civilization, and their century-long rule over the united upper and lower Egyptian kingdoms.

=== Roma ===
Roma are to be found in many parts of the Middle East and North Africa; their numbers are unknown. They speak their own language and may loosely follow the predominant religion of the country they live in.

=== Shabaks ===
Shabaks are mainly found in Iraq, they are either Muslim or follow native religions. They are also related to Kurds, but like the Yazidi, emphasise their separate identity.

=== Somalis ===
Somali is the official language in Somalia, while Arabic is recognized as a second language, both of which belong to the Afro-Asiatic family. Article 3 of the constitution outlines the country's founding principles, establishing it as a Muslim state, and a member of the Arab and African nations. About 85% of local residents are ethnic Somalis, who have historically inhabited the northern part of the country. Many self-identify as Somali instead of Arab despite centuries-old ties to Arabia. There are also a number of: Bantus; Bajunis; Bravanese; Pashtunis; Persians & Punjabis people.

Djibouti, whose demographics are approximately 61% Somali and 35% Afar, is in a similar position. Arabic is one of the official languages, 94% of the nation's population is Muslim, and its location on the Red Sea places it in close proximity to the Arabian Peninsula. Somali and Afar are also recognized national languages.

=== Turks ===
The Arab world is home to sizeable populations of Turks throughout North Africa, the Levant, and the Arabian Peninsula.

There is a notable Turkish minority in Egypt; prior to the Egyptian revolution in 1919, the ruling and upper classes were mainly Turkish, or of Turkish descent (see Turks in Egypt), which was part of the heritage from the Ottoman rule of Egypt.

In the Levant the Turks are scattered throughout the region. In Iraq and Syria the Turkish minorities are commonly referred to as "Turkmen", "Turkman" and "Turcoman"; these terms have historically been used to designate Turkish speakers in Arab areas, or Sunni Muslims in Shiite areas. The majority of Iraqi Turkmen and Syrian Turkmen are the descendants of Ottoman Turkish settlers. and share close cultural and linguistic ties with Turkey, particularly the Anatolian region. In 2013 the Iraqi Ministry of Planning estimated that Iraqi Turkmen numbered 3 million out of the country's 34.7 million inhabitants (approximately 9% of the total population). Estimates of the Syrian Turkmen population range from several hundred thousand to 3.5 million. There is also Turkish minorities located in Jordan (Turks in Jordan) and Lebanon (Turks in Lebanon). In Lebanon, they live mainly in the villages of Aydamun and Kouachra in the Akkar District, as well as in Baalbek, Beirut, and Tripoli. The Lebanese Turks number approximately 80,000. However, there has also been a recent influx of Syrian Turkmen refugees (125,000 to 150,000 in 2015) who now outnumber the long establish Ottoman descended Turkish minority.

In the Arabian Peninsula, there are Turkish minorities who have lived in the region since the Ottoman era. The Turks live predominately in Saudi Arabia (see Turks in Saudi Arabia) and Yemen (see Turks in Yemen).

=== Yazidi ===
The Yazidi are a religious Kurdish community who represent an ancient religion that is linked to Zoroastrianism. They number 600,000 in Iraq and between 10,000 and 50,000 in Syria.

=== Modern identities ===
==== North Africans ====
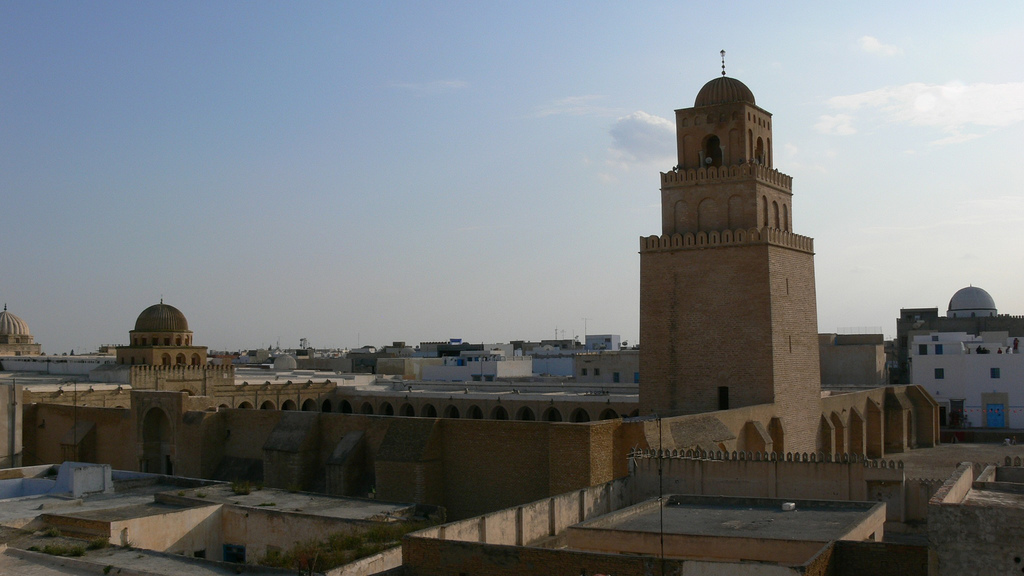
Great Mosque of Kairouan, Tunisia

North Africans are the inhabitants of the North Africa (Morocco, Algeria, Tunisia, Libya and Egypt). Maghrebis mostly speak Maghrebi Arabic, which is descended from Classical Arabic and has a marked Berber substratum, while Egyptians speak Egyptian Arabic which is mainly based on Coptic grammar rather than Classical Arabic.

In 647 AD (the year 27 of the Hijrah), the first Muslim expedition to Africa took place. By 700 AD, the area had been conquered and converted to the Islamic faith. We know little of the early Islamic town, but by the tenth century the area outside of the fortress was once more filled with houses: on the site of the Roman baths over twelve of these were excavated, with large courtyards surrounded by long, thin, rooms.

After ruling over Cairo, the Fatimids left the rule in Tunisia and parts of eastern Algeria to the Zirids (972–1148). The invasion of Tunisia which was known as Ifriqiya, was done by the Banu Hilal, an Arab tribe encouraged by the Fatimids to seize North Africa.

== See also ==
- Demographics of the Middle East and North Africa
- List of largest cities of the Arab world
- List of Arab countries by population
- List of Arab League countries by GDP (nominal)

== Genetics ==
=== Y chromosome ===
Listed here are the human Y-chromosome DNA haplogroups in main regions of the Arab world (Maghreb, Mashriq and Arabian peninsula).

Haplogroup	n	A	B	C	DE	E1a	E1b1a	E1b1b1	E1b1b1a	E1b1b1a1	E1b1b1a1b	E1b1b1a2	E1b1b1a3	E1b1b1a4	E1b1b1b	E1b1b1c
Marker						M33	M2	M35	M78	V12	V32	V13	V22	V65	M81	M34
Maghreb																
Sahara/Mauritania	189	-	0.53	-	-	5.29	6.88	-	-	-	-	-	-	-	55.56	11.11
Morocco	760	0.26	0.66	-	-	2.76	3.29	4.21	0.79	0.26	-	0.26	1.84	3.68	67.37	0.66
Algeria	156	-	-	-	-	0.64	5.13	0.64	1.92	0.64	-	0.64	1.28	1.92	44.23	1.28
Tunisia	601	-	0.17	-	-	0.5	0.67	1.66	-	-	-	-	3	3.16	50.73	1.16
Libya	83	-	-	-	-	-	38.55	-	-	-	-	2.41	-	4.82	45.78	-
Machrik																
Egypt	370	1.35	-	-	-	0.54	2.43	3.24	0.81	7.03	1.62	0.81	9.19	2.43	11.89	6.76
Lebanon, Palestine, Jordan, Syria, Iraq	2741	0.18	0.04	0.04	-	0.33	0.62	0.44	-	-	-	1.24	8.72	-	0.84	5.36
Arabian Peninsula	618	0.16	0.81	0.97	0.81	0.32	5.66	1.94	0.49	-	-	0.32	2.43	-	0.16	5.66

Haplogroup (continued)	F	G	H	I	J1	J2	K	L	N	O	P,R	Q	R1a1	R1b	R1b1a	R1b1b	R2	T
Marker	M89	M201	M69											M343	V88	M269		M70
Maghreb																		
Sahara/Mauritania		-	-	-	13.23	-	-	-	-	-	-	-	-	-	6.88	0.53	-	-
Morocco	0.26	0.66	-	0.13	6.32	1.32	0.53	-	-	-	0.26	-	-	-	0.92	3.55	-	-
Algeria	3.85	-	-	-	21.79	2.49	0.64	-	-	-	-	0.64	0.64	-	2.56	7.04	-	-
Tunisia	2.66	0.17	-	0.17	26.64	6.83	0.33	-	-	-	0.33	-	0.5	-	1.83	0.33	-	1.16
Libya	-	8	-	-	-	-	-	-	-	-	2.41	-	-	-	6.02	-	-	-
Machrik																		
Egypt	1.08	5.68	-	0.54	20.81	6.75	0.27	0.81	-	0.27	0.54	0.27	2.16	-	2.97	2.97	0.54	6.22
Lebanon, Palestine, Jordan, Syria, Iraq	0.15	5.47	-	2.84	30.83	21.05	0.69	3.43	0.15	0.07	0.66	1.2	3.39	0.36	5.47	1.97	0.47	3.98
Arabian Peninsula	1.29	2.91	2.1	-	44.01	11.32	4.37	2.27	-	0.65	0.32	1.46	6.31	0.16	-	2.43	0.16	0.49

== Comparison of the members ==
Country	Area (km^{2})	Population (2021)	GDP PPP (in trillions $)	TFR
Arab League	13,132,327	406,691,829	3,335.3	
Algeria	2,381,740	44,177,969	284.7	2.80 (2020)
Bahrain	761	1,463,265	34.96	1.74 (2019 est)
Comoros	2,235	821,625	0.911	4.3 (2012 est)
Djibouti	23,200	1,105,557	2.505	2.8 (2011 est)
Egypt	1,001,450	109,262,178	2.372	2.63 (2021 est)
Iraq	438,317	43,533,592	249.4	3.6 (2018 est)
Jordan	89,342	11,148,278	132.092	2.6 (2020 est)
Kuwait	17,818	4,250,114	165.8	2.03 (2020 est)
Lebanon	10,452	5,592,631	51.474	1.74 (2014 est)
Libya	1,759,540	6,735,277	173.6	2.20 (2011 est)
Mauritania	1,030,700	4,614,974	8.204	5.20 (2021)
Morocco	710,850	37,076,584	180	1.87 (2013 est)
Oman	309,500	4,520,471	94.86	2.66 (2020)
Qatar	11,586	2,688,235	126.37	1.67 (2020 est)
Saudi Arabia	2,149,690	35,950,396	2.230	1.92 (2018)
Somalia	637,657	17,065,581	5.896	35.70 (2013 est)
Sudan	1,861,484	45,657,202	189.97	4.49 (2012)
Syria	185,180	21,324,367	107.6	3.0 (2012)
Tunisia	163,610	12,262,946	108.4	1.86 (2012 est)
United Arab Emirates	83,600	9,365,145	569.8	1.75 (2019 est)
Yemen	527,968	32,981,641	61.63	4.4 (2013 est)
