= Turks in the Arab world =

Ethnic group in the Arab world

A map of the Arab world. This is based on the standard territorial definition of the Arab world which comprises the states and territories of the Arab League.

The Turks in the Arab world (Arabic: الأتراك في الوطن العربي; Turkish: Arap coğrafyasındaki Türkler) refers to ethnic Turkish people who live in the Arab world. There are significant Turkish populations scattered throughout North Africa, the Levant, and the Arabian Peninsula.

In Libya, some groups identify themselves as Turkish, or descendants of Turkish soldiers who settled in the area in the days of the Ottoman Empire There is also a significant Turkish minority in Egypt.

In the Levant, the Turks live across the region. In Iraq and Syria the Turkish minorities are commonly referred to as "Turkmen", "Turkman" and "Turcoman"; historically, these terms have been used to designate Turkish speakers in Arab areas, or Sunni Muslims in Shitte areas. The majority of Iraqi Turkmen and Syrian Turkmen are the descendants of Ottoman Turkish settlers. and share close cultural and linguistic ties with Turkey, particularly the Anatolian region. There are also Turkish minorities located in Palestine and in Lebanon. The Lebanese Turks live mainly in the villages of Aydamun and Kouachra in the Akkar District, as well as in Baalbek, Beirut, and Tripoli.

In the Arabian Peninsula, there are Turkish minorities who have lived in the region since the Ottoman era. The Turks live predominately in Saudi Arabia and in Yemen.

== Population of Turkish minorities ==
Country	Current est. Turkish population	Further information	Lists of Turks
Egypt	1,500,000 (1993 estimate) (150,000 in Arish, plus 100,000 Cretan Turks); Approximately 3% of Egyptians originate from Asia Minor (approx. 2.8 million)	Turks in Egypt	
Iraq	3,000,000 (2013 Iraqi Ministry of Planning estimate)	Iraqi Turkmens	
Jordan	60,000 plus Palestinian-Turkish refugees: 55,000 in Irbid; 5,000 near Amman; 5,000 in El-Sahne; 3,000 in El-Reyyan; 2,500 in El-Bakaa; 1,500 in El-Zerkaa; 250 in Sahab	Turks in Jordan	
Lebanon	80,000 plus 125,000 to 150,000 Syrian Turkmen refugees	Turks in Lebanon	
Libya	4.7% of Libya's population (1936 census); 100,000 Cretan Turks only (1971 estimate); Approximately 350.000 today based on official data from the 1936 census.	Turks in Libya	
Palestinian territories	West Bank: 35,000 to 40,000	Turks in Palestine	
Saudi Arabia	200,000	Turks in Saudi Arabia	
Syria	estimates range from hundreds of thousands to 3.5 million	Syrian Turkmens	
Tunisia	est. 500,000-2,000,000	Turks in Tunisia	
United Arab Emirates	10,000	Turks in the United Arab Emirates	
Yemen	10,000 to 100,000 or more than 200,000	Turks in Yemen	

== See also ==
- Turks in Europe
- Turkish population

== Notes ==
a: The Iraqi Turkmen are the descendants of various waves of Turkic migration to Mesopotamia dating from the 7th century until Ottoman rule. Most of today's descendants of the 7th century migrants have been assimilated into the local Arab population. Thus, the majority of today's Iraqi Turkmen are the descendants of the Ottoman soldiers, traders, and civil servants who were brought into Iraq during the rule of the Ottoman Empire.

== Bibliography ==
- Akar, Metin (1993), "Fas Arapçasında Osmanlı Türkçesinden Alınmış Kelimeler", Türklük Araştırmaları Dergisi, 7: 91–110
- Baedeker, Karl (2000), Egypt, Elibron, ISBN 1-4021-9705-5
- Doğanay, Hayati (1995), "Cumhuriyetin 70.Yılında Türk Dünyası'nın Siyasi Sınırları", Doğu Coğrafya Dergisi, 1 (1): 23–56
- Hizmetli, Sabri (1953), "Osmanlı Yönetimi Döneminde Tunus ve Cezayir'in Eğitim ve Kültür Tarihine Genel Bir Bakış" (PDF), Ankara Üniversitesi İlahiyat Fakültesi Dergisi, 32: 1–12
- International Crisis Group (November 13, 2008), Turkey and the Iraqi Kurds: Conflict or Cooperation?, International Crisis Group, Middle East Report N°81, archived from the original on 2011-01-12
- Jawhar, Raber Tal’at (2010), "The Iraqi Turkmen Front", in Catusse, Myriam; Karam, Karam (eds.), Returning to Political Parties?, The Lebanese Center for Policy Studies, pp. 313–328, ISBN 978-1-886604-75-9.
- Karpat, Kemal H. (2004), Studies on Turkish Politics and Society: Selected Articles and Essays:Volume 94 of Social, economic, and political studies of the Middle East, BRILL, ISBN 90-04-13322-4.
- Kibaroğlu, Mustafa; Kibaroğlu, Ayșegül; Halman, Talât Sait (2009), Global security watch Turkey: A reference handbook, Greenwood Publishing Group, ISBN 978-0-313-34560-9.
- The Report: Algeria 2008, Oxford Business Group, 2008, ISBN 978-1-902339-09-2.
- Özkaya, Abdi Noyan (2007), "Suriye Kürtleri: Siyasi Etkisizlik ve Suriye Devleti'nin Politikaları" (PDF), Review of International Law and Politics, 2 (8), archived from the original (PDF) on 2011-01-24
- Pan, Chia-Lin (1949), "The Population of Libya", Population Studies, 3 (1): 100–125, doi:10.1080/00324728.1949.10416359
- Park, Bill (2005), Turkey's policy towards northern Iraq: problems and perspectives, Taylor & Francis, ISBN 0-415-38297-1.
- Taylor, Scott (2004), Among the Others: Encounters with the Forgotten Turkmen of Iraq, Esprit de Corps Books, ISBN 1-895896-26-6
