= Turkish communities in the former Ottoman Empire =

Descendants of Ottoman-Turkish settlers living outside of the modern borders of Turkey

Ottoman Empire
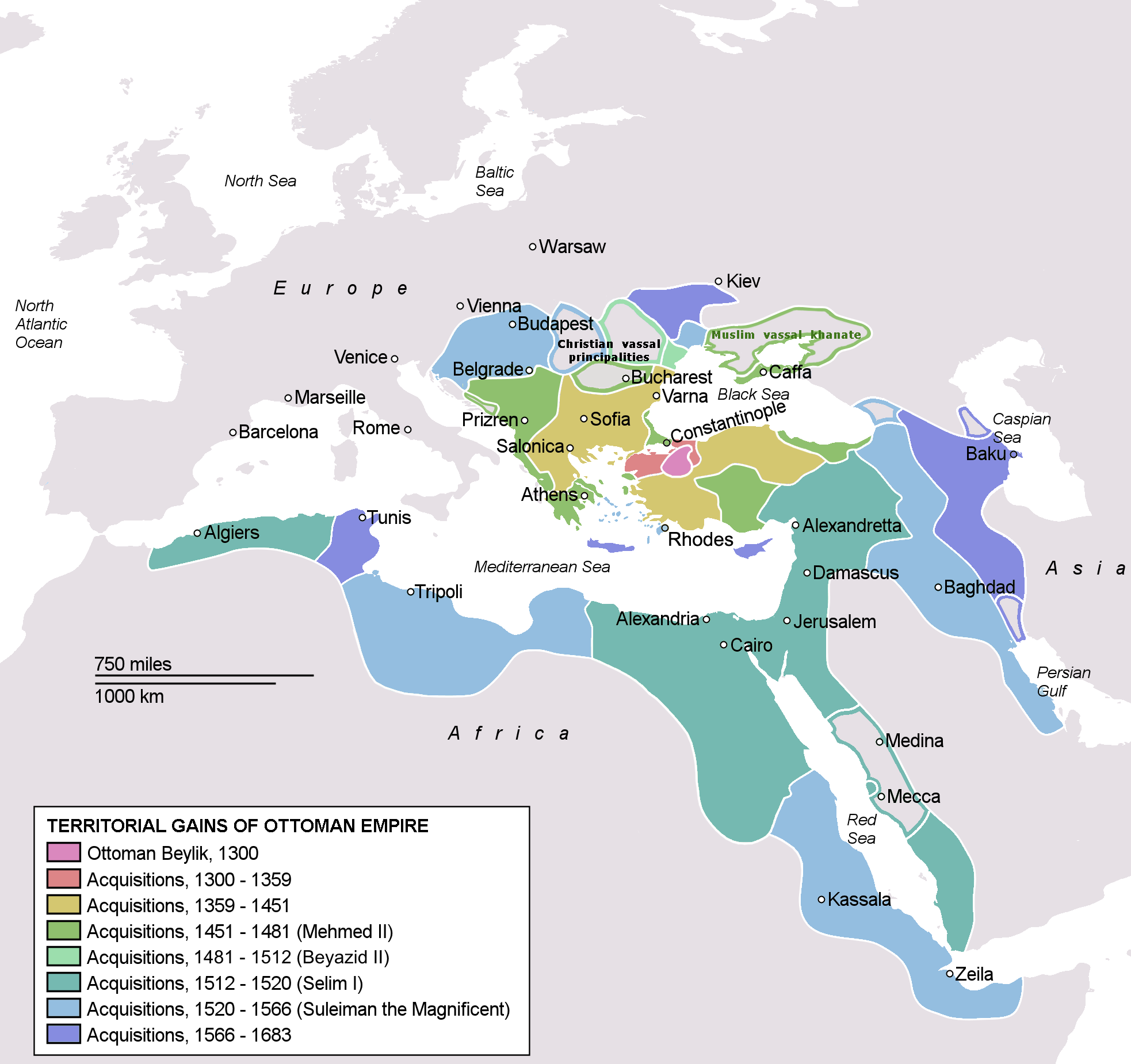
- Alternative names: Ottoman civilization
- Geographical range: Balkans, Caucasus, Middle East, North Africa
- Dates: 1299 – 1922
- Major sites: Istanbul, İzmir, Edirne
- Characteristics: Throughout the centuries of Ottoman rule, hundreds of thousands of Turkish settlers were sent to various regions of the Ottomans, including regions of the Balkans, Caucasus, Mesopotamia, Hejaz, Cyprus, Levant and North Africa

The Turkish communities in the former Ottoman Empire refers to ethnic Turks, who are the descendants of Ottoman-Turkish settlers from Anatolia and Eastern Thrace, living outside of the modern borders of the Republic of Turkey and in the independent states which were formerly part of the Ottoman Empire. Thus, they are not considered part of Turkey's modern diaspora, rather, due to living for centuries in their respective regions (and for centuries under Turkish rule), they are now considered "natives" or "locals" as they have been living in these countries prior to the independence and establishment of the modern-nation states.

Today, whilst the Turkish people form a majority in the Republic of Turkey and Northern Cyprus, they also form one of the "Two Communities" in the Republic of Cyprus, as well as significant minorities in the Balkans, the Caucasus, the Levant, the Middle East and North Africa. Consequently, the Turkish ethnicity and/or language is officially recognised under the constitutional law of several states, particularly in the Balkans.

== Turkish communities ==
=== Cyprus ===
According to the 1960 Constitution of the Republic of Cyprus (Articles 2 and 3) the Turkish Cypriots are recognised as one of the "Two Communities" of the Republic (alongside the Greek Cypriots). Hence, legally, they have equal power-sharing rights with the Greek Cypriots and are not defined as a "minority group", despite being fewer in numbers (numbering 1,128 in the south of the island in the 2011 census). The Turkish language is an official language of the republic, alongside the Greek language. However, due to the Cyprus crisis of 1963–64, followed by the Greek-led 1974 Cypriot coup d'état and then the 1974 Turkish invasion of Cyprus, the northern half of the island was occupied by Turkey and the Turkish Cypriots declared their own "state" - the Turkish Republic of Northern Cyprus (TRNC), recognized only by Turkey - in 1983. Today it is partly populated by Turkish Cypriots and mostly by Turkish settlers. According to the 2011 "TRNC" census, the population of Northern Cyprus was 286,257. Other estimates suggests that there is between 300,000-500,000 Turkish Cypriots and Turkish settlers living in the north of the island.

== Turkish minorities ==
=== Balkans ===
Country	Census figures	Alternate estimates	Legal recognition	Further information	Lists of Turks by country
Bosnia and Herzegovina	267 (1991 census)	50,000	The Turkish language is officially recognized as a minority language, in accordance with the European Charter for Regional or Minority Languages, under Article 2, paragraph 2, of the 2010 ratification.	Turks in Bosnia and Herzegovina	List of Bosnian Turks
Bulgaria	588,318 or 8.8% of Bulgaria's population (2011 census)	750,000-800,000	The Bulgarian constitution of 1991 does not mention any ethnic minorities and the Bulgarian language is the sole official language of the State. However, in accordance with Article 36(2), the Turkish minority has the right to study their own language alongside the compulsory study of the Bulgarian language. Moreover, under Article 54(1), the Turkish minority have the right to "develop their culture in accordance with his ethnic identification".	Turks in Bulgaria	List of Bulgarian Turks
Croatia	367 (2011 Croatian census)	2,000	The Turks are officially recognised as a minority ethnic group, in accordance with the 2010 Constitution of Croatia.	Turks in Croatia	List of Croatian Turks
Greece	85,945 or 1.2% of Greece's population (1951 census)	150,000 (80,000 to 130,000 in Western Thrace, 10,000 to 15,000 in Athens, 5,000 in Rhodes and Kos, and 5,000 in Thessaloniki)	The Turks of Western Thrace have protected status to practice their religion and use the Turkish language, in accordance with the 1923 Treaty of Lausanne. However, the other sizeable Turkish minorities in Greece have no official recognition.	Turks in Greece	
Kosovo	18,738 or 1.1% of Kosovo's population (2011 Kosovar census)	30,000 to 50,000	The Turkish language is recognized as an official language in the municipalities of Prizren and Mamuša and has minority status in Gjilan, Pristina, Vučitrn, and Mitrovica.	Turks in Kosovo	List of Kosovar Turks
North Macedonia	77,959 or 3.85% of North Macedonia's population (2002 census)	170,000-200,000	Initially the 1988 draft constitution spoke of the "state of the Macedonian people and the Albanian and Turkish minority". Once the 1991 constitution came into force the Turkish language was used officially where Turks formed a majority in the Centar Župa Municipality and the Plasnica Municipality. Since the 2001 amendment to the constitution, the Turkish language is officially used where Turks form at least 20% of the population and hence it is also an official language of Mavrovo and Rostuša.	Turks in North Macedonia	List of Turks in North Macedonia
Montenegro	104 (2011 Montenegrin census).	N/A	N/A	Turks in Montenegro	
Romania	28,226 or 0.15% of Romania's population (2011 Romanian census)	55,000 to 80,000	The Turkish language is officially recognized as a minority language, in accordance with the European Charter for Regional or Minority Languages, under Part III of the 2007 ratification.	Turks in Romania	List of Romanian Turks
Serbia	647 (2011 Serbian census)	N/A	N/A	Turks in Serbia	

=== Caucasus ===
Country	Census figures	Alternate estimates	Legal recognition	Further information	Lists of Turks by country
Abkhazia	731 (2011 Abkhazian census)	15,000	N/A	Turks in Abkhazia	
Azerbaijan	Turkish minority N/A. The 2009 Azeri census recorded 38,000 Turks; however, it does not distinguish between the Turkish minority (descendants of Ottoman settlers who remained in Azerbaijan), Meskhetian Turks who arrived after 1944, and recent Turkish arrivals.	19,000 (Descendants of Ottomans settlers who remained in Azerbaijan only. This does not include the much larger Meskhetian Turkish and mainland Turkish arrivals who form a part of the diaspora)	N/A	Turks in Azerbaijan	
Georgia	*Pre-World War II: 137,921 (1926 USSR Census); The Turkish population was not recorded in later censuses; nonetheless, it is estimated that 200,000 Turks from the Meskheti region of Georgia were deported to Central Asia in 1944. *Post-World War II: The Meskhetian Turkish population in the USSR was published for the first in the 1970 census. However, by this point, the Turkish minority in Georgia had already diminished to several hundred due to the forced deportation of 1944. There were 853 Turks in Georgia in 1970, 917 in 1979, and 1,375 in 1989. *Post-USSR: Although a small number has returned to Georgia, they have not been recorded in the 2002 Georgian census.	1,500	N/A	Meskhetian Turks	

=== Levant ===
In the Levant the Turks are scattered throughout the region. In Iraq and Syria the Turkish minorities are commonly referred to as "Turkmen", "Turkman" and "Turcoman"; these terms have historically been used to designate Turkic (Oghuz) speakers in Arab areas, or Sunni Muslims in Shitte areas. Indeed, today, the majority of Iraqi Turkmen and Syrian Turkmen are the descendants of Ottoman Turkish settlers. and, therefore, share close cultural and linguistic ties with Turkey, particularly the Anatolian region. There is also Turkish minorities located in Jordan (Turks in Jordan) and Lebanon (Turks in Lebanon). In Lebanon, they live mainly in the villages of Aydamun and Kouachra in the Akkar District, as well as in Baalbek, Beirut, and Tripoli.

Country	Census figures	Alternate estimates	Legal recognition	Further information	Lists of Turks by country
Iraq	567,000 or 9% of the total Iraqi population (1957 census)	3,000,000 (Iraqi Ministry of Planning estimate, 2013)	In 1925 the Turks were recognised as a constitutive entity of Iraq, alongside the Arabs and Kurds, however, the minority were later denied this status. In 1997 the Iraqi Turkoman Congress adopted a Declaration of Principles, Article Three of which states the following: "The official written language of the Turkomans is Istanbul Turkish, and its alphabet is the new Latin alphabet."	Iraqi Turkmens	List of Iraqi Turks
Israel	N/A	N/A	N/A	Turks in Israel	
Jordan	N/A	Turkish minority: Palestinian-Turkish refugees: 55,000 in Irbid; 5,000 near Amman; 5,000 in El-Sahne; 3,000 in El-Reyyan; 2,500 in El-Bakaa; 1,500 in El-Zerkaa; 1,500 in Sahab	N/A	Turks in Jordan	List of Jordanian Turks
Lebanon	N/A	80,000 (plus 125,000 to 150,000 Syrian Turkmen refugees)	N/A	Turks in Lebanon	List of Lebanese Turks
Palestine	N/A	est. West Bank: 35,000 to 40,000	N/A	Turks in Palestine	
Syria	N/A	500,000-3.5 million	N/A	Syrian Turkmens	List of Syrian Turks

=== North Africa ===
In North Africa there is still a strong Turkish presence in the Maghreb, particularly in Algeria Libya, and Tunisia (see Algerian Turks, Libyan Turks, and Tunisian Turks). They live mainly in the coastal cities (such as in Algiers, Constantine, Oran and Tlemcen in Algeria; Misurata and Tripoli in Libya; and Djerba, Hammamet, Mahdia, and Tunis in Tunisia). In these regions, people of partial Turkish origin have historically been referred to as Kouloughlis (Turkish: kuloğlu) due to their mixed Turkish and central Maghrebi blood. Consequently, the terms "Turks" and "Kouloughlis" have traditionally been used to distinguish between those of full and partial Turkish ancestry. In addition, there is also a notable Turkish minority in Egypt. Prior to the Egyptian revolution in 1919, the ruling and upper classes were mainly Turkish, or of Turkish descent, which was part of the heritage from the Ottoman rule of Egypt.

Country	Census figures	Alternate estimates	Legal recognition	Further information	Lists of Turks by country
Algeria	N/A	Approximately 5% of Algeria's population estimates: 600,000 to 2 million	N/A	Turks in Algeria	List of Algerian Turks
Egypt	N/A	1.5 million (including 150,000 in Arish) plus 100,000 Cretan Turks	N/A	Turks in Egypt	List of Egyptian Turks
Libya	35,062 or 4.7% of Libya's population (1936 census)	Approximately 350.000 today based on official data from the 1936 census. Among those 100,000 Cretan Turks	N/A	Turks in Libya	List of Libyan Turks
Tunisia	N/A	Between approximately 5% up to 17% of Tunisia's population estimates: 500,000-2,000,000	N/A	Turks in Tunisia	List of Tunisian Turks

=== Other countries ===
Country	Census figures	Alternate estimates	Legal recognition	Further information	Lists of Turks by country
Saudi Arabia	N/A	200,000	N/A	Turks in Saudi Arabia	List of Saudi Arabian Turks
Yemen	N/A	10,000 to 100,000 or more than 200,000	N/A	Turks in Yemen	List of Yemeni Turks

== See also ==
- Misak-ı Millî
- Muhacir
- Balkan Turks
- Turks in Europe
