= European people =

Umbrella term for people in Europe or of European descent

Flag of Europe, used to identify with a civic nationalist identity of European people

Extent of the European continent (green) with land boundaries set along the Ural Mountains in the east and along the Caucasus Mountains in the south

European people or Europeans is an umbrella term for people who belong to any ethnic, racial, or national group with origins in Europe. Today, it primarily refers to people who are from Europe and reside in the continent, as well as the European diaspora. By extension, however, the term "European" may be applied to identify people in the context of demographics in certain countries outside of Europe—namely in the Americas and in Oceania—where people of European ancestry constitute the majority of the population while being part of a non-European national group. People of European descent in Africa are also included in most definitions. Additionally, any person who holds European Union citizenship may be identified as European in that particular context.

As of 2025, Europe's total population is estimated to be 744 million people, with nearly 87 million international migrants in 2020. Per a 2015 estimate, over 480 million people in countries outside of Europe have at least some European ancestry. Most Indigenous Europeans are racially classified as White, which is also the most common term applied to people of European descent in non-European countries. Between the 18th and 20th centuries, a now-disproven race concept classified European people as part of the so-called Caucasian race, which broadly grouped together the populations of Europe, West Asia, North Africa, and in parts of Central and South Asia. Although it is generally avoided in modern academic discourse, "Caucasian" is still used in official data for United States censuses to racially classify people whose ancestry or ethnicity is European, Middle Eastern, or North African.

== Population of Europe ==
Over 744 million people are estimated to be living in Europe, as of 2025. In a 2024 report, the International Organization for Migration estimated that Europe was hosting approximately 87 million international migrants in 2020. The majority of non-European migrants in Europe originate from Asia (50%), Africa (20%), and Latin America and the Caribbean (15%). With regard to irregular migration to the European Union, the top countries of origin of irregular migrants to Western Europe were Egypt, Syria, Tunisia, China, India, Russia, Pakistan, Venezuela, Turkey, Algeria and Afghanistan; while the top countries of origin of irregular migrants to Eastern Europe were Syria, Afghanistan, and Pakistan. Additionally, a large wave of intra-European migration began following the 2022 Russian invasion of Ukraine, which sparked Europe's largest refugee crisis since World War II.

Russia, which has a total population of 146 million people (of whom 110 million or 75% reside in European Russia), is the most populous country in Europe. However, the most populous country that is entirely within Europe's boundaries is Germany, which has a total population of 83 million people. The average European fertility rate is 1.50 children per woman, as of 2020.

== European diaspora ==
In 2015, an estimated 480 million people were part of the European diaspora, which comprises people of European origin not living in Europe. In some continents, this includes people who may be several generations removed from European societies and cultures due to historic levels of emigration from the continent during and after the Age of Discovery. Today, the Americas and Oceania are collectively home to the majority of people who can be identified as having at least some notable or consistent European ancestry outside of Europe. A 2015 analysis shows that the non-European country with the most people of European descent is the United States (223 million), followed by Brazil (91 million), Argentina (38 million), Canada (25 million), and Australia (20 million). The efforts by which European-origin populations expanded to eventually become the demographic majority in many parts of the New World occurred in tandem with the expansion of several European colonial empires, particularly those of the British, the French, the Spaniards, and the Portuguese.

== See also ==
- Asian people
- African people
- Indigenous peoples of the Americas
- Indigenous peoples of Oceania
