= Haya Maraachli =

Syrian actress (born 1997)

- Born: Haya Tarek Maraachli; 30 May 1997 (age 29); Damascus, Syria
- Education: Higher Institute of Dramatic Arts
- Occupation: Actress
- Years active: 2003–present
- Parent(s): Tarek Maraachli; Randa Maraachli
- Relatives: Ibrahim Maraachli (grandfather); Nahed Halabi (grandmother)

Haya Maraachli (Arabic: هيا مرعشلي) is a Syrian actress.

== Career ==
Maraachli began her acting career at the age of six, making her television debut in 2003 with a role in the Syrian series Abu Al-Mafhumiya. She became widely recognized in 2011, at around 14 years old, when she appeared in the Syrian drama Jalsat Nisaiya, directed by Al-Muthanna Sobh. The role established her as a rising actress, and in the same year she received the Best Emerging Syrian Actress award.

== Personal life ==
Maraachli's father, Tarek, is the son of the Lebanese actor Ibrahim Maraachli who was of Turkish origins, while her mother, Randa is Syrian and partly Circassian. However, she holds only Lebanese citizenship and does not have Syrian citizenship.
