= Turks in Serbia =

Ethnic group in Serbia

Турци у Србији Sırbistan'daki Türkler

Total population
- 850 (2022)

Regions with significant populations
- Belgrade, Sandžak

Languages
- Turkish and Serbian

Religion
- Sunni Islam

Turks in Serbia are people of Turkish ancestry living in Serbia. According to the data from 2022 census, 850 people declared themselves as ethnic Turks.

== History ==
Turks settled on the territory of present-day Serbia during the Ottoman rule and traditionally have lived in towns and cities; however, in 1830, when the Principality of Serbia was granted autonomy, most Turks emigrated as "muhacirs" to Ottoman Turkey, and by 1862 almost all of the remaining Turks left Serbia, including 3,000 from Belgrade. Turks in Serbia are people of Turkish ancestry living in Serbia. According to the data from the 2022 census, 850 people declared themselves as ethnic Turks.

== Notable people ==
- Nevzat Tandoğan – Turkish politician, Serbian maternal descent
- Hikmet Kıvılcımlı – Turkish politician, theoretician, writer, and publicist
- Yahya Kemal Beyatlı – Turkish poet, Serbian maternal descent
- Leskofçalı Galip – Ottoman poet
- Kılıçzade Hakkı – Turkish philosopher and writer
- Cevat Abbas Gürer – Turkish politician
- İsmail Hakkı Kılıçoğlu – Turkish politician
- Muallim Cevdet – Turkish writer
- Okan Demirok – first runner up of Best Model of Turkey in 2016

== See also ==
- Turkish communities in the former Ottoman Empire
  - Turks in Bosnia and Herzegovina
  - Turks in Bulgaria
  - Turks in Croatia
  - Turks in Hungary
  - Turks in Kosovo
  - Turks in Montenegro
  - Turks in North Macedonia
  - Turks in Romania
- Serbia–Turkey relations

== Bibliography ==
- Blagojević, Gordana (2007), Recent Turkish Migrants in Serbia and the Role of the Serbian-Turkish Friendship Association (PDF), Ethnographic Institute of the SASA, Belgrade.
