= Turks in Abkhazia =

English essay

Total population
- 10,000–15,000

Regions with significant populations
- Sukhumi

Languages
- Turkish; Abkhaz

Religion
- Islam

The Turks in Abkhazia, also known as Abkhazian Turks, (Turkish: Abhazya Türkleri) are people of Turkish ancestry who have had a thriving presence in Abkhazia since the rule of the Ottoman Empire. Today, the community numbers about 10,000-15,000.

== Notable people ==
- Almasbei Kchach
- Konstantin Ozgan

== See also ==
- Turkish minorities in the former Ottoman Empire
- Meskhetian Turks
