= Lebanese Turkmen =

People of Turkish ancestry living in Lebanon

Lübnan Türkmenleri

Total population
- Turkish-Lebanese minority (only immigrants during late Ottoman rule): 80,000 (2011 estimate by Al Akhbar) Plus Syrian Turkmen refugees: 200,000 (2018 estimate) Total: at least 280,000 approximately 4% of Lebanon's population (excluding recent immigrants from Turkey and Palestinian refugees of Turkish Cypriot or Palestinian Turkmen origin)

Regions with significant populations
- Akkar; Baalbeck; Beirut; Tripoli

Languages
- Arabic (Lebanese Arabic); Turkish

Religion
- Sunni Islam

Related ethnic groups
- Turkish diaspora

Lebanese Turkmen (Turkish: Lübnan Türkmenleri; Arabic: أتراك لبنان, Atrāk Lubnān), also known as the Lebanese Turks or Lebanese Turkish people are people of Turkish ancestry that live in Lebanon. The historic rule of several Turkic dynasties in the region saw continuous Turkish migration waves to Lebanon during the Tulunid rule (868–905), Ikhshidid rule (935–969), Seljuk rule (1037–1194), Mamluk rule (1291–1515), and Ottoman rule (1516–1918).

Today, many of the Turkish Lebanese community are the descendants of the Ottoman Turkish settlers to Lebanon from Anatolia. However, with the declining territories of the Ottoman Empire in the 19th century, ethnic Turkish minorities from other parts of the former Ottoman territories found refuge in Ottoman Lebanon, especially Algerian Turks after the French colonization of North Africa in 1830, and Cretan Turks in 1897 due to unrest in Greece.

Ottoman rule in Cyprus came to an end in 1914, when control of the island passed over the British Empire. More recently, since 2011, there has been a substantial wave of Syrian Turks who have fled the Syrian civil war and have taken refuge in Lebanon. They now outnumber the long-established Turkish community which descend from the Ottoman times.

In addition to the descendants of centuries-old Turkish communities, as well as more recent refugees, since the 20th century, Lebanon has attracted Turkish economic workers who have come from the Republic of Turkey.

== History ==
=== Mamluk rule (1291–1515) ===
==== Assaf dynasty ====
The Assafs were the descendants of Turkmen tribesmen settled in the Keserwan area of central Mount Lebanon, north of Beirut under the early Mamluk rulers. According to the local chronicler Tannus al-Shidyaq (d. 1861), the Turkmens were settled there by the Mamluk governor of Damascus, Aqqush al-Afram, following his punitive expedition against the rebellious Alawites, Twelver Shia Muslims, Druze and Maronites of Keserwan and the neighboring Jurd area to the south in 1305. The rebels were decisively suppressed by January 1306, their lands were transferred as iqtas to Mamluk emirs in Damascus and later that year the Turkmens were settled there. They were established in the villages of Ayn Shiqaq, Ayn Tura, Zuq Masba, Zuq Mikhayil, Zuq al-Amiriyya and Zuq al-Kharab, having been previously settled in the Kura region near Tripoli. The Assaf or the Turkmens, in general, were entrusted by the Mamluks with maintaining a 300-strong cavalry unit to patrol the region between Beirut and Byblos and to guard entry into the Keserwan from Beirut. At least part of them were resettled in Beirut by the strongman of the Mamluk Sultanate, Yalbugha al-Umari, to reinforce the Damascene troops stationed there to defend the town against a potential Crusader attack in the aftermath of the Cypriot raid on Alexandria.

In 1382, the Mamluk emir Barquq usurped the throne in Cairo, establishing the Burji regime. The latter were ethnic Circassians unlike their Turkmen Bahri predecessors, which resulted in frayed relations between the Turkmens of Keserwan and the new rulers. Nonetheless, Barquq kept the Turkmen emirs as the lords of Keserwan, albeit in a weakened state. Barquq likely kept the Turkmens in place to avoid giving the Buhturids too much power in Mount Lebanon or to avoid over-extending Buhturid forces. According to the historian Kamal Salibi, only four Turkmen emirs have been named in primary sources: a certain Sa'id who ruled in 1361, his brother and successor Isa, and a certain Ali ibn al-A'ma and his brother Umar ibn al-A'ma. The latter two were the Turkmen emirs involved in the rebellion against Barquq. Ali was killed in Barquq's punitive expedition, while Umar was imprisoned and released.

=== Ottoman rule (1516–1918) ===
==== Turkish migration from Ottoman Anatolia ====
Lebanon became part of the Ottoman Empire in 1516, and Turks were brought into the region along with Sultan Selim I’s army during his campaign to Egypt and were settled in the conquered lands. Turkish colonists were encouraged to stay in Lebanon by being rewarded with land and money.

==== Turkish migration from Ottoman Algeria ====
In 1830 many Algerian Turks were forced to leave Ottoman Algeria once the region came under French colonial rule. Whilst the majority went to Ottoman Anatolia, some Turkish and Kouloughli families also went to Ottoman Syria which included Lebanon at the time.

==== Turkish migration from Ottoman Crete ====
The history of the Cretan Turks in Lebanon began when the Ottoman Empire lost its dominion over the island of Crete. After 1897, when the Ottoman Empire lost control of the island, they sent ships to protect the island’s Cretan Turks. Most of these Turks were settled in İzmir and Mersin, but some of them were also sent to Tripoli and Damascus. After World War I, the Ottoman Empire lost Lebanon, however, some of the Cretan Turks remained in Tripoli where their relatives lived. Today, there are about 10,000 Cretan Turks remaining in Tripoli.

=== Modern migration ===
==== Turkish Cypriot refugees from Palestine to Lebanon (1947–1949) ====
Approximately 4,000 Turkish Cypriot brides were sent to Palestine. Turkish Cypriot women who formed their new families in Palestine soon found themselves as Palestinians refugees in Lebanon (as well as in Jordan and Syria) after fleeing the 1947–1949 Palestine war.

==== Mainland Turkish workers (1950s–present) ====
In the 1950s, thousands of Turks left the city of Mardin and headed for Lebanon because of the economic crisis and high unemployment rate in Turkey. Many of these migrants settled in Beirut and could already speak Arabic. Therefore, they quickly adapted to life in Lebanon.

==== Syrian Turkmen refugees (2011–present) ====
In October 2015 the Syrian independent newspaper Zaman Al Wasl reported that 125,000 to 150,000 Syrian Turkmen refugees, who have escaped from the Syrian civil war, have settled in Lebanon, and hence they now outnumber the Turkish minority of Lebanon.

== Demographics ==
=== Population ===
==== Turkish minority (Ottoman descendants) ====
In 2011 Al Akhbar reported that the number of Turks in Lebanon who descend from settlers who arrived in the region during the late Ottoman period was 80,000. This, however, does not include the descendants of the much earlier Turkish migrants to Lebanon.

==== Syrian Turkmen refugees ====
The Turkish-Lebanese population has increased significantly with the arrival of Syrian Turkmen refugees during the Syrian civil war. In 2015, there were approximately 120,000–150,000 Syrian Turkmen refugees in the country. Approximately 90,000 Syrian Turkmen were living in Arsal. By 2018, the number of Syrian Turkmen refugees throughout Lebanon had increased to approximately 200,000.

=== Areas of settlement ===
The descendants of the early Ottoman Turkish settlers mainly live in Akkar (including the villages of Kouachra and Aydamun) and Baalbeck, while the descendants of the later Ottoman Turkish arrivals, mainly the Cretan Turks, currently live in Tripoli. More recent Turkish arrivals to modern Lebanon from Turkey and Syria (Syrian Turks) live in Beirut and Arsal. There are also Turkmen living in villages around Dinniye in the North Governorate.

== Politics ==
The Turkish community is becoming more politically active by seeking better representation locally and support from the Turkish embassy in Beirut.

=== Organisations ===
Established in 1997, the "Future Youth Association", located in Beirut's Witwat neighborhood, is the most active Turkish association in Lebanon. Because of confusion over its name with the Future Movement, its office sustained damage during the 7 May 2008 armed clashes in Beirut between pro-Hariri and pro-Hezbollah forces. The Future Youth Association organises Turkish language classes in Beirut using teachers sent from Turkey’s Ministry of Education. The turnout for these classes have so far exceeded expectations, with many Lebanese of Turkish origin attending classes.

=== Associations ===
- The Lebanese Turkish Cultural Association, established in 2010 in Eidmon and chaired by Kamal Maqsoud
- The Lebanese Turkmen Association, established in 2012 and chaired by Ahmed Al-Turkmani
- The Lebanese Turkish Brotherhood Association, established in 2012 in the town of Kouachra
- Inmaa Hawara Turkmen Society, established in 2015 in Mejdlaya, headed by Muhammad Turkmani
- Duras Social Charitable Society, established in 2006 in Baalbek and represented by Ali Ibrahim Ghurli

== Notable people ==
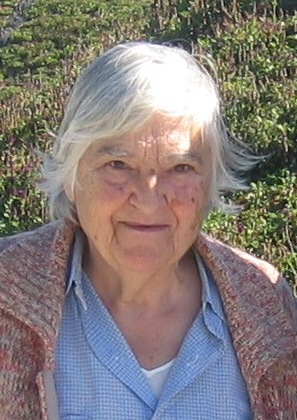
Etel Adnan, poet and visual artist

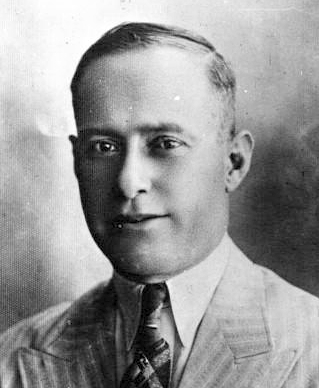
Fawzi al-Qawuqji, leader of the Arab Liberation Army.

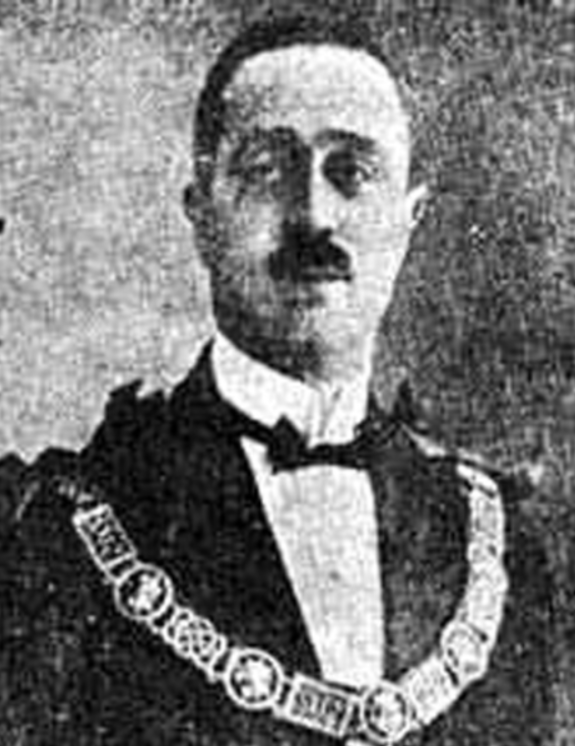
Ahmad Nami, second President of Syria

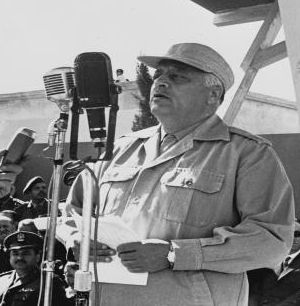
Ahmad Shukeiri, first Chairman of the Palestine Liberation Organization.

- Etel Adnan, poet and visual artist
- Fawzi al-Qawuqji, military figure
- Mostapha al-Turk, mixed martial artist
- Safia Chamia, Tunisian singer and actress
- Omar El-Turk, basketball player
- Yasmine Ghata, French writer
- Shirine Khoury-Haq, businesswoman
- Khashoggi family (originally from Kayseri)
  - Emad Khashoggi, businessman and part of the Saudi-Turkish Khashoggi family
  - Nabila Khashoggi, businesswoman and part of the Saudi-Turkish Khashoggi family
- Maraachli family (originally from Maraş)
  - Haya Maraachli, actress
  - Ibrahim Maraachli, actor and comedian
  - Lama Maraachli, actress
  - Randa Maraachli, actress
  - Tarek Maraachli, actor
- Huda Naamani, Feminist writer and artist
- Ahmad Nami, second President of Syria (1926–28)
- Bilal Aziz Özer, football player
- Ahmad Shukeiri, first Chairman of the Palestine Liberation Organization
- Nadia Sirry, painter
- Rola Yammout, singer
- Fathi Yakan, Islamic cleric
- Rose al Yusuf, actress and journalist

== See also ==
- Assaf dynasty
- Turkish minorities in the former Ottoman Empire
  - Turkish Cypriots
  - Turks in the Arab world
    - Turks in Egypt
    - Turks in Palestine
    - Turks in Syria
  - Turks in Israel
- Turkish diaspora
  - Turks in France
  - Turkish Americans
  - Turkish Australians
- History of Lebanon under Ottoman rule
- Lebanon–Turkey relations

== Bibliography ==
- Bakhit, Muhammad Adnan (1982). The Ottoman province of Damascus in the sixteenth century. Librairie du Liban. ISBN 9780866853224.
- Harris, William (2012). Lebanon: A History, 600–2011. Oxford University Press. ISBN 9780195181111.
- Khal, Helen (1988), The Woman Artist in Lebanon, University of Michigan, ASIN B002UUYIRE.
- Orhan, Oytun (2010), The Forgotten Turks: Turkmens of Lebanon (PDF), ORSAM, archived from the original (PDF) on 2016-03-03.
- Rogan, Eugene L. (2009), The Arabs: A History, Pennsylvania State University, ISBN 978-0-14-102469-1.
- Salibi, Kamal S. (1959). Maronite Historians of Medieval Lebanon. Beirut: American University of Beirut.
- Salibi, Kamal (June 1967). "Northern Lebanon under the Dominance of Ġazīr (1517–1591)". Arabica. 14 (2): 144–166. doi:10.1163/157005867X00029. JSTOR 4055631.
- Salibi, Kamal S. (1988). A House of Many Mansions: The History of Lebanon Reconsidered. University of California Press. ISBN 9780520071964.
- Winter, Stefan (2010). The Shiites of Lebanon under Ottoman Rule, 1516–1788. Cambridge University Press. ISBN 9781139486811.
