= Israeli Turkmen =

Turkish minority

İsrail Türkmenleri

Total population
- 22,000 (2007)

Languages
- Turkish

Religion
- Majority Sunni Islam

Related ethnic groups
- Syrian Turkmen, Lebanese Turkmen, Turkish Jews in Israel

Israeli Turkmens also called Israeli Turks or Israeli Turkish people are ethnic Turkish people from the Republic of Turkey settled in Israel during the 2000s.

Regarding people of ethnic Turkish origin who lived in Palestine prior to the establishment of the State of Israel, see Turks in Palestine.

== Diaspora ==
During and after the 1947–1949 Palestine war, some Turkmen fled the region and settled in Jordan, Syria, and Lebanon.

During the British mandate of Palestine, the Turk tribes like Bani-Saidan and Bani Alaqama lived mostly in the Jezreel Valley region; and, up until the Israeli conquest in 1948, Turkmen tribes lived in the Golan Heights.

== See also ==
- Arkadaş Association
- Circassians in Israel
- History of the Jews in Turkey
- Israel–Turkey relations
- Turkish Jews in Israel
- Turkish minorities in the former Ottoman Empire
- Turks in Palestine

== Bibliography ==
- Council of Europe (2007), Parliamentary Assembly: Working Papers 2007 Ordinary Session 22–26 January 2007, Council of Europe, ISBN 978-92-871-6191-8.
- Drori, Israel (2009), Foreign Workers in Israel: Global Perspectives, SUNY Press, ISBN 978-0-7914-7689-5.
- Suwaed, Muhammad (2015), "Turkmen, Israeli", Historical Dictionary of the Bedouins, Rowman & Littlefield, ISBN 978-1442254510.
