= Turkic Saudi Arabians =

Turkic Saudi Arabians are citizens of Saudi Arabia with Turkic ancestry. A majority came to Mecca for Hajj or escaping the Russian Empire in the early 20th century. There were an estimated 20,000 Turkic people living in Mecca in 1909, making up around 13% of its population at the time and being the largest non-Arab community in the city.

== Influence on Saudi Cuisine ==
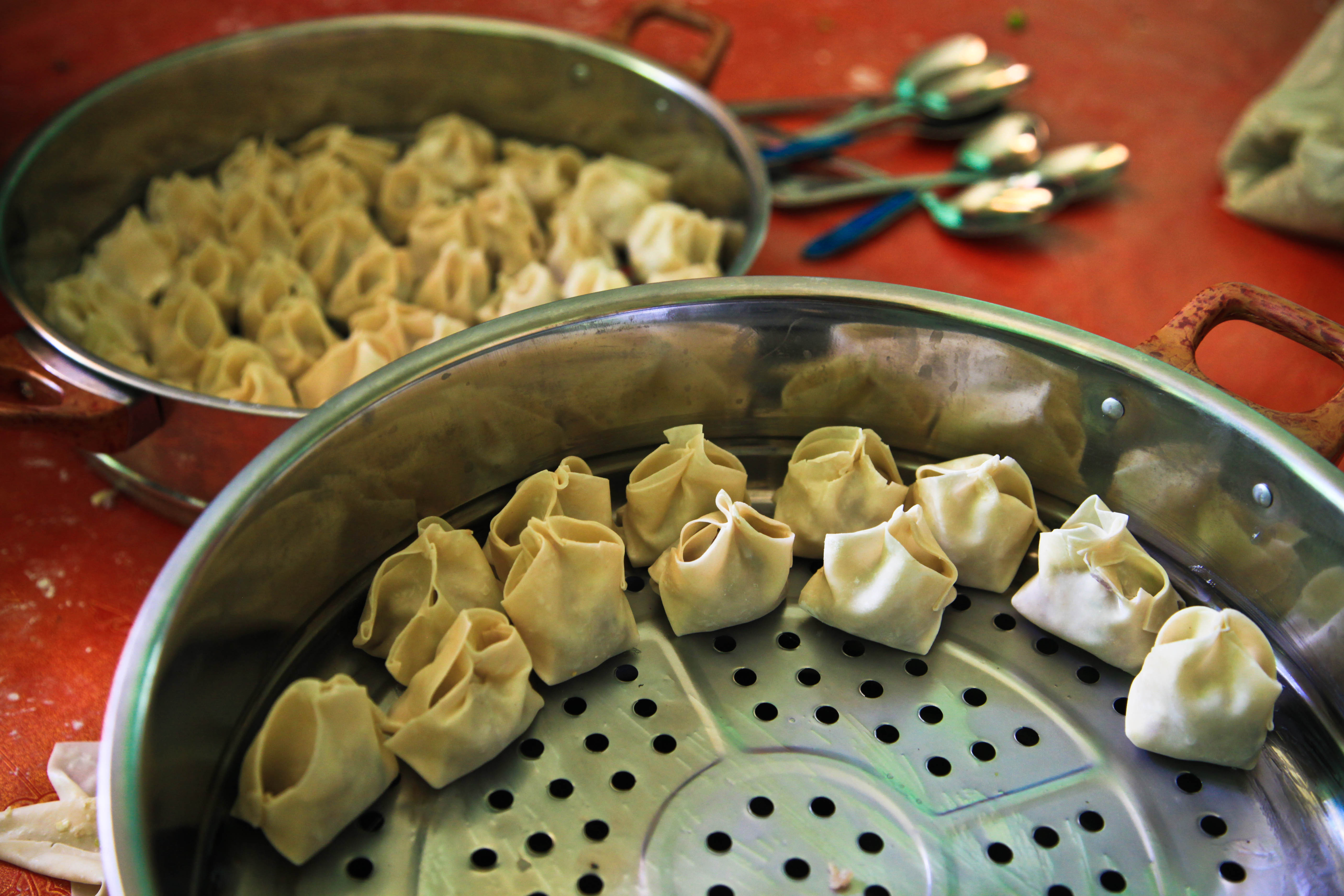
Mantu.

There is significant Turkic influence in Saudi Cuisine, with many Central Asian dishes becoming staples, such as Bukhari rice, dumplings, laghman, and manti.

== See also ==
- Demographics of Saudi Arabia
