= Turks in Yemen =

Ethnic group in Yemen

Total population
- 200,000

Regions with significant populations
- Sana'a

Languages
- Turkish; Arabic

Religion
- Sunni Islam

Related ethnic groups
- Turkish diaspora

Turks in Yemen (Turkish: Yemen Türkleri), also known as Turkish Yemenis, Yemeni Turks or Yemeni Turkmen, refers to the ethnic Turks who live in Yemen.

== History ==
The majority of today's Yemeni Turks are the descendants of the Ottoman Turkish settlers who began to migrate to the region as part of the expansion of the Ottoman Empire, which controlled, at least nominally, the region for over 300 years. The Yemen Eyalet (province) of the Ottoman Empire covered much of modern Yemen.

== Demographics ==
Today, estimates of the Turkish community in Yemen range from more than 10,000 to 100,000 About 6,000 live in Sana'a.

Some 150 kilometres from Yemen's capital, Sanaa, Beyt al-Turki is inhabited by Turkish inhabitants who first moved to the area around 200 years ago. The surname of most of the residents in this village is “Turki.”

== Notable people ==
- Cahide Sonku, first female film director in Turkey

== See also ==
- Demographics of Yemen
- Turkey–Yemen relations
- Turkish diaspora
- Turkish minorities in the former Ottoman Empire
  - Turks in the Arab world
- Yemen Eyalet

== Bibliography ==
- Ayhan, Veysel (2010). "Civil War in Yemen: The Power Struggle, Regional Influences and Relations with Turkey" (PDF). Center for Middle Eastern Strategic Studies. 10 (January 2010). ORSAM.
- Masters, Bruce (2009). "Yemen". In Ágoston, Gábor; Masters, Bruce (eds.). Encyclopedia of the Ottoman Empire. Infobase Publishing. ISBN 978-1-4381-1025-7..
