= Turks in Saudi Arabia =

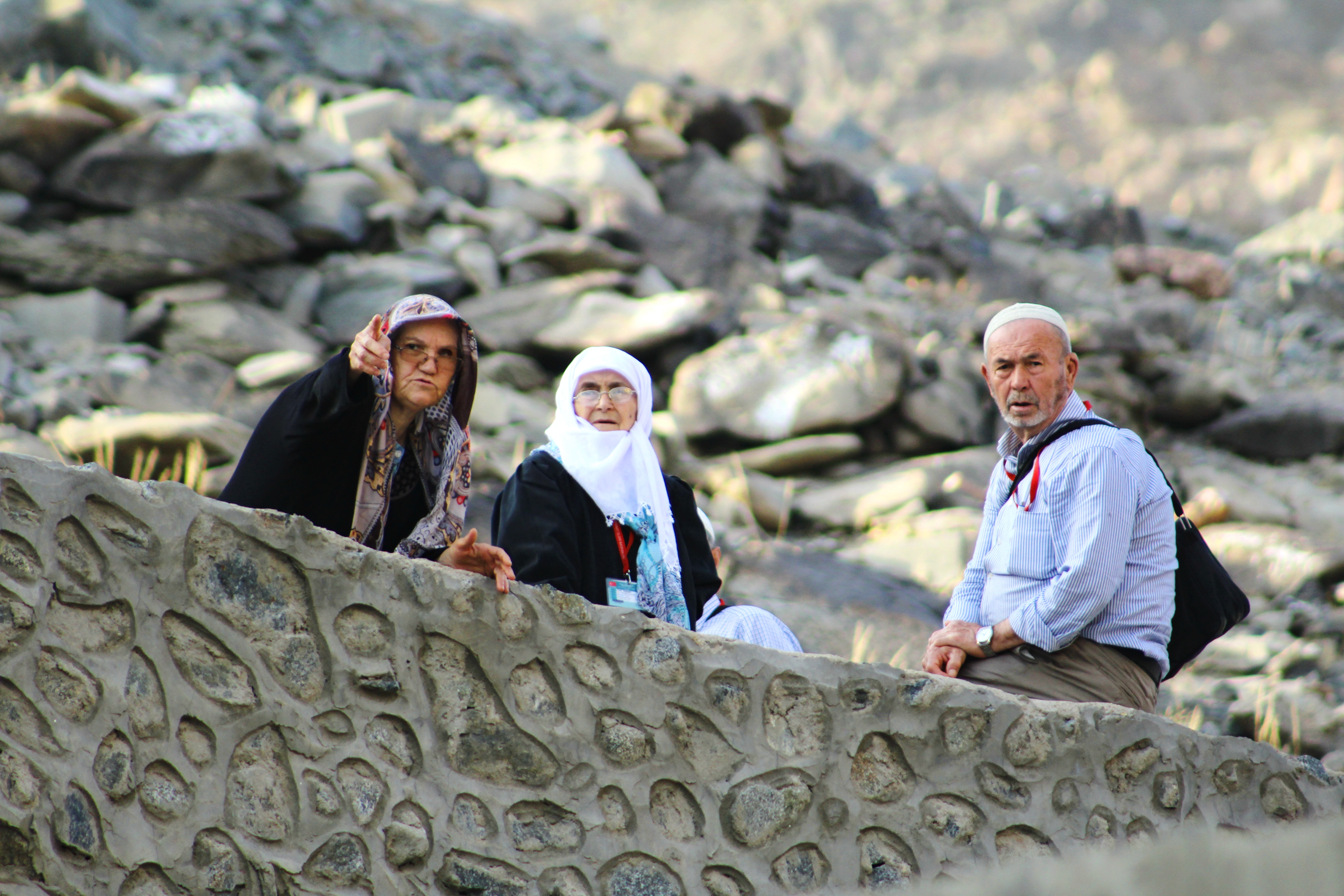
- A group of Turkish pilgrims at Jabal Thawr to perform umrah

Total population
- Turkish Arabian minority (i.e. Ottoman descendants only): 150,000 (1993 est.); Modern-day Turkish immigrants: 120,000-200,000

Regions with significant populations
- Riyadh, Jeddah, Mecca

Languages
- Turkish; Arabic

Religion
- Sunni Islam

Related ethnic groups
- Turkish diaspora

Turks in Saudi Arabia also referred to as Turkish Saudi Arabians, Saudi Arabian Turks or Saudi Turks (Turkish: Suudi Arabistan Türkleri, Arabic: الأتراك في السعودية) refers to ethnic Turkish people living in Saudi Arabia. The majority of Arabian Turks descend from Ottoman settlers who arrived in the region during the Ottoman rule of Arabia. Most Ottoman Turkish descendants in Saudi Arabia trace their roots to Anatolia; however, some ethnic Turks also came from the Balkans, Cyprus, the Levant, North Africa and other regions which had significant Turkish communities. In addition to Ottoman settlement policies, Turkish pilgrims to Mecca and Medina often settled down in the area permanently.

There has also been modern migration to Saudi Arabia from the Republic of Turkey as well as other modern nation-states which were once part of the Ottoman Empire.

== History ==
=== Ottoman Turkish migration ===
Turks have had a presence in the western Arabian peninsula for hundreds of years, culminating in the Ottoman conquest of the Hejaz in 1517. After the Great Arab Revolt and the decline of the Ottoman Empire, a Turkish minority remained in the newly founded Saudi Kingdom.

=== Modern Turkish migration ===
Starting in the 1970s, economic relations between Turkey and Saudi Arabia grew. In 1977, there was 6,500 Turks in Saudi Arabia, 5,000 of which were officially reported workers.

Emigration of Turkish workers to Saudi Arabia
Year	Population
1961–1973	4
1974–1980	26,739
1981–2023	986,754
1991–1995	150,654
2000-2023	925,789

== Business ==
As per argaam, Turkish nationals workers were around 25,000 people, which represents around 0.20% of total population. There are some 8,100 Turkish-operated hairdresser shops, 4,200 restaurants, and 2,900 furniture stores in Saudi Arabia.

== Politics ==
During the 2017 Turkish constitutional referendum, more than 8,000 Turkish expats from Saudi Arabia cast votes whether Turkey should abolish its parliamentary system and become a presidential republic. 58.34% of the Turkish expatriates in Saudi Arabia opted for "No", while 41.66% voted for "Yes". The "Yes" vote was concentrated in Jeddah and the Western Region, while in Riyadh "No" was the dominant choice. The "no" vote was significantly higher compared to votes of several European Turkish expat communities.

== Notable people ==
- Kamal Adham, businessman
- Iffat Al-Thunayan (Turkish mother), princess and the most prominent wife of King Faisal
  - children:
  - Princess Sara, activist for women and children welfare
  - Prince Mohammed, businessman
  - Princess Latifa
  - Prince Saud, served as Saudi Arabia's foreign minister from 1975 to 2015
  - Prince Abdul Rahman, military officer and businessman
  - Prince Bandar, military officer
  - Prince Turki, chairman of King Faisal Foundation's Center for Research and Islamic Studies
  - Princess Lolowah, prominent activist for women's education
  - Princess Haifa
    - grandchildren:
    - Amr bin Mohammed Al Saud, businessman
    - Reem Al Faisal, photographer
    - Faisal bin Turki Al Faisal Al Saud
    - Abdulaziz bin Turki Al Faisal, racing driver and businessman
    - Reema bint Bandar Al Saud, Saudi Arabian ambassador to the United States
    - Khalid bin Bandar bin Sultan Al Saud, Saudi Arabian Ambassador to the United Kingdom
    - Faisal bin Bandar bin Sultan Al Saud, president of the Saudi Arabian Federation for Electronic and Intellectual Sports (SAFEIS) and the Arab eSports Federation
- Fatima Al-Banawi, is a Saudi Arabian filmmaker and actress
- Omar Basaad, music producer
- Muhammad Khashoggi, medical doctor
  - children:
  - Adnan Khashoggi, businessman
  - Samira Khashoggi, author and the owner and editor-in chief of Alsharkiah magazine
  - Soheir Khashoggi, novelist
    - grandchildren
    - Dodi Fayed, film producer
    - Emad Khashoggi, businessman and the head of COGEMAD
    - Jamal Khashoggi, general manager and editor-in-chief of Al-Arab News Channel
    - Nabila Khashoggi, businesswoman, actress, and philanthropist
- Sahika Inal, is a scientist who is an associate professor and Chair of the Organic Bioelectronics Laboratory at King Abdullah University of Science and Technology

== See also ==
- Saudi Arabia – Turkey relations
- Turkish minorities in the former Ottoman Empire
  - Turks in the Arab world
- Turkic Saudi Arabians
- Ajyad Fortress
- Arabs in Turkey

== Bibliography ==
- Ergener, Reşit (2002), About Turkey: Geography, Economy, Politics, Religion, and Culture, Pilgrims Process, ISBN 0-9710609-6-7.
- Fuller, Graham E. (2008), The new Turkish republic: Turkey as a pivotal state in the Muslim world, US Institute of Peace Press, ISBN 978-1-60127-019-1.
- Hale, William M. (1981), The Political and Economic Development of modern Turkey, Taylor & Francis, ISBN 0-7099-0014-7.
- Harzig, Christiane; Juteau, Danielle; Schmitt, Irina (2006), The Social Construction of Diversity: Recasting the Master Narrative of Industrial Nations, Berghahn Books, ISBN 1-57181-376-4.
- Jung, Dietrich; Piccoli, Wolfango (2001), Turkey at the Crossroads: Ottoman Legacies and a Greater Middle East, Zed Books, ISBN 1-85649-867-0.
- Karpat, Kemal H. (2004), Studies on Turkish Politics and Society: Selected Articles and Essays:Volume 94 of Social, economic, and political studies of the Middle East, BRILL, ISBN 90-04-13322-4.
- Koslowski, Rey (2004), Intnl Migration and Globalization Domestic Politics, Taylor & Francis, ISBN 0-203-48837-7.
- Organisation for Economic Co-operation and Development (1997), Trends in International Migration: Continuous Reporting System on Migration: Annual Report 1996, OECD Publishing, ISBN 92-64-15508-2.
- Papademetriou, Demetrios G.; Martin, Philip L. (1991), The Unsettled Relationship: Labor Migration and Economic Development, Greenwood Publishing Group, ISBN 0-313-25463-X.
- Sirageldin, Ismail Abdel-Hamid (2003), Human Capital: Population Economics in the Middle East, American University in Cairo Press, ISBN 977-424-711-6.
- Unan, Elif (2009), MICROECONOMIC DETERMINANTS OF TURKISH WORKERS REMITTANCES: SURVEY RESULTS FOR FRANCE-TURKEY (PDF), Galatasaray University
