= Turks in Jordan =

Ürdün Türkleri

Total population
- 60,000 Ottoman Turks; 100,000 to 1,000,000 Turkmens (mostly of Palestinian origin); plus 8,262 Turkish citizens (2009)

Regions with significant populations
- Amman, Irbid, Kuraima, Deiralla, Salt, Einbasha, Zarqa, Ramtha, Karak, Tafilah

Languages
- Turkish; Arabic

Religion
- Sunni Islam

Related ethnic groups
- Turks, Azerbaijanis, Syrian Turkmens, Turks in Palestine, Iraqi Turkmens

Turks in Jordan, also known as Turkic People in Jordan, Turkish Jordanians or Turkmen Jordanians (Turkish: Ürdün Türkmenleri), are people of Oghuz Turkic ancestry living in Jordan. These people have had a thriving presence in Jordan since the rule of the Ottoman Empire. Today, there is a minority of about 60,000 people in the country who are the descendants of the Ottoman-Turkish immigrants. There are also Jordanians with Turkmen-Palestinian ancestry, whether fully or partially Turkmen, their numbers range from 100,000 to a million, many identify as Arabs without knowing their Turkmen heritage, their ancestors first settled Northern Palestine in the 11th century during the reign of the Seljuk Empire. In addition to this, there are also 8,262 (2009) Turkish citizens who are recent migrants to Jordan.

== History ==
Turkic presence in Jordan is a bit disputed, some say that Turks migrated to Jordan in the 11th century to populate this region to protect it from crusader invasion, other say that Turks first settled Transjordan during the Ottoman period (16th-19th centuries). Nowadays, most Turkmens/Turks in Jordan are originally from Palestine, from regions like Marj Beni Amer and Jerusalem.

== Notable people ==
- Lara Abdallat, winner of Miss Jordan 2010 (Turkish Syrian mother)
- Rania Al-Abdullah, Queen of Jordan (maternal Turkish grandfather)
- Muhanna Al-Dura, painter (Turkish mother)
- Ahmet Düverioğlu, basketball player (Turkish mother)
- Zein Al-Sharaf Talal, Queen of Jordan (Turkish Cypriot origin)
- Prince Mired bin Ra'ad, grandson of the Turkish painter Fahrelnissa Zeid
- Prince Zeid bin Ra'ad, grandson of the Turkish painter Fahrelnissa Zeid
- Mihrimah Sultan, Imperial Princess of Ottoman Empire

== See also ==
- Jordan–Turkey relations
- Turkish minorities in the former Ottoman Empire
- Turks in the Arab world

== Bibliography ==
- Akar, Metin (1993), "Fas Arapçasında Osmanlı Türkçesinden Alınmış Kelimeler", Türklük Araştırmaları Dergisi, 7: 91–110
- Council of Europe (2007), Parliamentary Assembly: Working Papers 2007 Ordinary Session 22-26 January 2007, Council of Europe, ISBN 92-871-6191-7.
- Organisation for Economic Co-operation and Development (2005), Migration, Remittances and Development, OECD Publishing, ISBN 92-64-01388-1.
