= Turks in Montenegro =

Turkish people in Montenegro

Turks in Montenegro Karadağ'daki Türkler Turci u Crnoj Gori Турци у Црној Гори
Total population
- 1 816 (2023 census)

Regions with significant populations
- Budva Municipality 345 (1.26%); Tivat Municipality 178 (1.09%); Podgorica Municipality 956 (0.53%)

Languages
- Turkish, Montenegrin

Religion
- Sunni Islam

Related ethnic groups
- Turkish diaspora

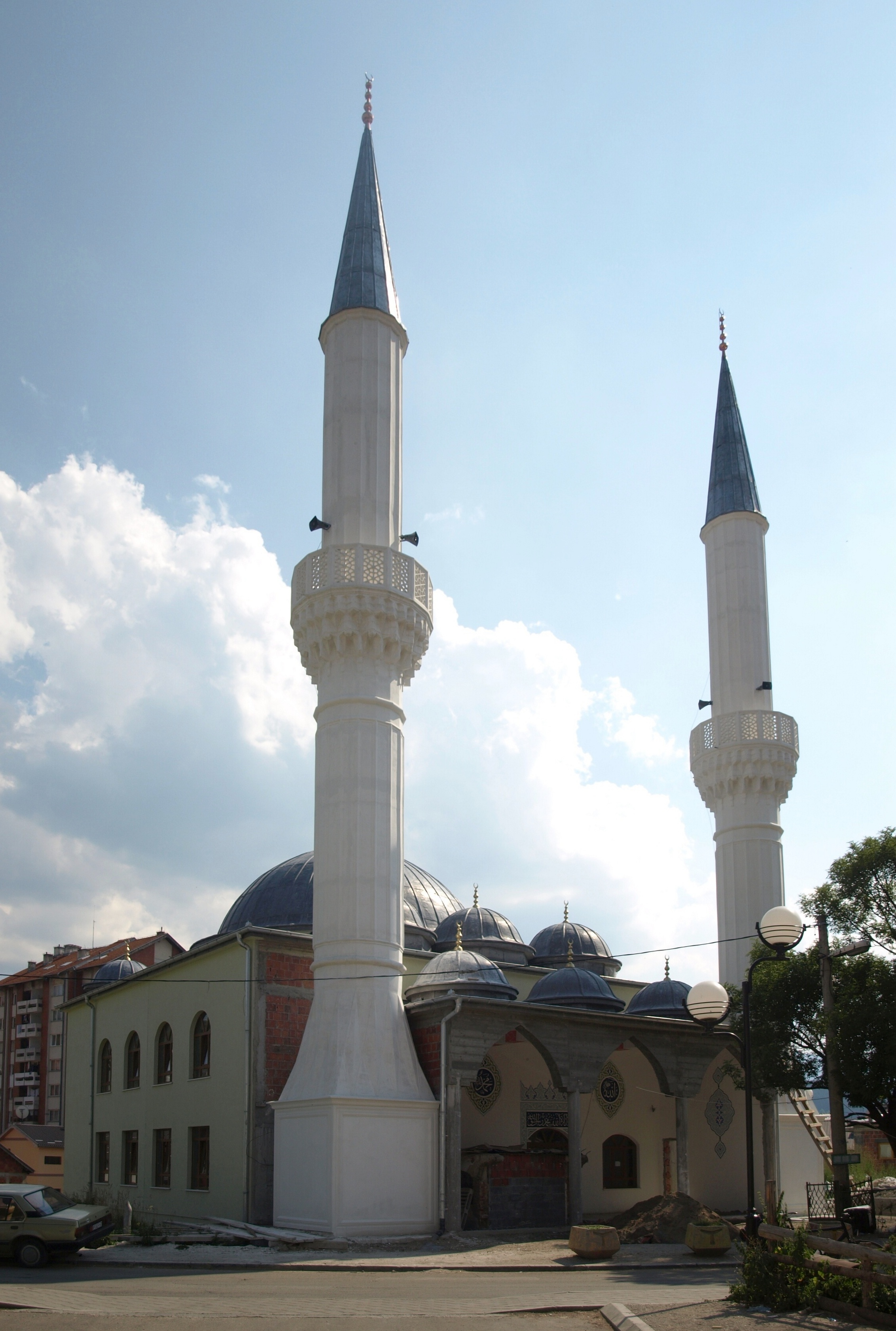
Sultan Murat II mosque in Rožaje

Turks in Montenegro, also known as Turkish Montenegrins and Montenegrin Turks, (Turkish: Karadağ Türkleri) are ethnic Turks who form an ethnic minority in Montenegro.

== History ==
In 1496 the Ottoman Empire conquered Montenegro which bequeathed a significant Turkish community due to the Ottoman colonisation process. However, in the early 20th century, after the Ottomans were defeated in the Balkan Wars, the majority of Turks along with other Muslims living in the region left their homes and migrated to Turkey as muhacirs ("refugees").

== Demographics ==
According to the 2023 census, there are 1.816 Turks living in the country, forming a minority of some 0.29% of the total population. According to the same census, the number of citizens of Montenegro who speak Turkish language is 1.823 (0.29%).

Turks in Montenegro
Year	Turks
1961	2,392
1971	397
1981	–
1991	–
2011	104
2023	1,816

=== Age–sex structure ===
The average age of the Turkish minority is slightly higher than 40 years old. The population is overwhelmingly male (>65%), as there are only 36 females (<35%).

Age and sex structure of the Turkish minority in Montenegro
Age group	Total	Male	Female
0–6	11	7	4
7–18	8	3	5
19–25	11	6	5
26–40	21	15	6
41–60	42	28	14
older than 60 years	11	9	2
Total	104	68	36

=== Religion ===
Turks in Montenegro are predominantly Sunni Muslims, with a small number of atheists.

=== Diaspora ===
The number of Turks in Montenegro declined significantly with the fall of the Ottoman Empire, and many Turks became refugees and moved to Turkish cities, such as Istanbul and İzmir. In the early 2020s, an increasing trend of Turkish immigrants in Montenegro was observed, and the number of Turks in Montenegro increased from 104 in the 2011 census to 1,816 in the 2023 census.

== Notable people ==
- Şakir Bayhan, forest engineer and lexicographer;
- Sabiha Ćorović Gökçen, world's first female fighter pilot, one of the 9 children adopted by Mustafa Kemal Atatürk.

== See also ==
- Montenegro–Turkey relations
- Turkish minorities in the former Ottoman Empire
  - Turks in the Balkans
- Montenegrin–Ottoman War (1876–1878)
- The Mountain Wreath
- Montenegrins in Turkey
