= Aydamun =

Aydamun عيدمون
- Village
- Location within Lebanon
- Coordinates: 34°35′53″N 36°17′13″E
- Country: Lebanon
- Governorate: Akkar
- District: Akkar
- Elevation: 745 m (2,444 ft)
- Time zone: UTC+2 (EET)
  - Summer (DST): UTC+3 (EEST)
- Dialing code: +961

Aydamun (Arabic: عيدمون, romanized: ʿAydamūn, also spelled as Aidamoun or Aaidamoun) is a Lebanese village.

== Location ==
It is located in Akkar District, about 30 minutes away from the governorate's capital Halba, and 3 hours from the capital Beirut.

== History ==
In 1838, Eli Smith noted ''Aidemun as a "Greek Christians" and Turkmen village, located east of esh-Sheikh Muhammed.

== Population ==
It has a population of about 4,000 people, 66% of whom are of Sunni Lebanese Turkmen origin. Christians comprise the remainder (80% are Greek Orthodox, and 20% are Maronite). Due to its Turkish ethnic links, the village has received Turkish developmental assistance and funding. However, its Turkish links are not as strong as the nearby Turkish-populated village of Kouachra. In 1966 the village had a population of about 300 people, and it was famous for producing Akkar carpets, which were home-produced by the local women.

== See also ==
- Turks in Lebanon

== Bibliography ==
- Robinson, E.; Smith, E. (1841). Biblical Researches in Palestine, Mount Sinai and Arabia Petraea: A Journal of Travels in the year 1838. Vol. 3. Boston: Crocker & Brewster.
