= Turks in Palestine =

Turkish minority

Regions with significant populations
- Gaza Strip, Jerusalem, Ramallah, Jericho, Nablus

Languages
- Turkish, Arabic

Religion
- Sunni Islam

Related ethnic groups
- Turkish Cypriots, Syrian Turkmens, Turks in Lebanon

The Turks in Palestine (Turkish: Filistin'deki Türkler), also referred to as Palestinian Turks, Palestinian Turkmen and Palestinian Turkish people (Turkish: Filistin Türkmenleri) are ethnic Turkish descendants who have had a long-established presence in Palestine. With Turkish rule spanning between the years 1069-1917/22, mass Turkish migration was encouraged during the rule of Nureddin Zengi in Syria, and then when thousands of Turks participated in the battle of Jerusalem with Saladin. Turkish migration continued further during the Mamluk and Ottoman rule of Palestine as well as during the British rule.

== History ==
=== Ottoman rule (1517-1922) ===
==== Turkish Algerian migration wave (1830) ====
Once Ottoman Algeria came under French rule in 1830, many Turkish Algerians were forced to leave the region. Although the majority who fled were shipped off to Turkey, many others migrated to other regions of the Ottoman Empire, including Palestine, Syria, Arabia, and Egypt.

=== Turkish Cypriot brides (1920s-1950s) ===
During the British rule of Cyprus (1878-1950) Turkish Cypriots who remained on the island faced the harsh economic conditions of the Great Depression and its aftermath. Consequently, many families in the poorest villages, facing debt and starvation, married off their daughters to Arabs mainly in British Palestine in the hope that they would have a better life. A bride price was normally given by the groom to the family of the girls, usually about £10-20, enough to buy several acres of land at the time, as part of the marriage arrangements. Such payments had not been part of Cypriot tradition, and Cypriots typically describe the girls in these forced marriages as having been "sold". The marriages were sometimes arranged by brokers, who presented the prospective husbands as wealthy doctors and engineers. However, Neriman Cahit, in her book Brides for Sale, found that in reality many of these men had mediocre jobs or were already married with children. Unaware of these realities, Turkish Cypriot families continued to send their daughters to Palestine until the 1950s. Cahit estimates that within 30 years up to 4,000 Turkish Cypriot women were sent to Palestine to be married to Arab men.

== Diaspora ==
During and after the 1947–1949 Palestine war, many Turkish families fled the region and settled in Jordan, Syria, and Lebanon.

According to a 2022 news article by Al Monitor many families of Turkish origin in Gaza have been migrating to Turkey due to the "deteriorating economic conditions in the besieged enclave."

== Surnames ==
According to Nasser al-Yafawi, surnames which indicate Turkish origins often end with the -ji suffix (e.g, al-Batniji and al-Shorbaji) while other common names include al-Gharbawi, Tarzi, Turk, Birkdar, Jukmadar, Radwan, Jasir and al-Jamasi.

== Notable people ==
- Ahmad Shukeiri, the first Chairman of the Palestine Liberation Organization
- the Doghmush clan, criminal family
- Yusuf Hamdan, was a Palestinian rebel commander during the 1936–1939 Arab revolt
- Nada Zeidan, spokesmodel and female rally driver
- Nadine Salameh, actress

== See also ==
- Palestine–Turkey relations
- Abu Zurayq an archaeological site and former Turkish village in Palestine
- Fawzi al-Qawuqji
- Turks in Israel
- Turks in Jordan
- Turks in Lebanon
- Turks in Syria
