= Kouachra =

Kouachra الكواشرة
- Village
- Location within Lebanon
- Coordinates: 34°36′38″N 36°12′33″E
- Country: Lebanon
- Governorate: Akkar
- District: Akkar

Area
  - Total: 5.58 km^{2} (2.15 sq mi)
- Elevation: 700 m (2,300 ft)

Population
  - Total: 2,763
  - Density: 495/km^{2} (1,280/sq mi)
- Time zone: UTC+2 (EET)
  - Summer (DST): UTC+3 (EEST)
- Dialing code: +961

Kouachra (Arabic: الكواشرة, romanized: al-Kawāshra, also spelled as Kaweishra or Kavashra) is a village in Akkar Governorate, Lebanon. It is located approximately 131 kilometres (81 mi) north of Beirut and 38 kilometres (24 mi) north of Tripoli.

== Location ==
Kouachra is located in Akkar District, near Al Qoubaiyat about an hour's drive from Tripoli. The village is situated on flat terrain at an altitude of 700–800 meters (2,300–2,600 ft) above sea level. The village has a small artificial lake.

== Population ==
Kouachra has a population of about 2,800 people, mostly of Sunni Lebanese Turkmen origin. And most of its residents are farmers. As of 31 December 2022, 1,596 Syrian refugees are registered in the settlement.

The villagers support the Future Movement political party.

=== Turkish identity ===
Owing to its Turkish ethnic identity, the village was visited by the President of Turkey, Recep Tayyip Erdogan, in 2010 and has received Turkish developmental assistance and funding, including university scholarships in Turkey.

According to one local resident: "After Ottoman rule ended in Lebanon, we decided to stay on our land. We still maintain our Turkish language and traditions."

The village also houses several hundred Syrian Turkmen who have fled the Syrian Civil War.

== See also ==
- Turks in Lebanon
