= List of Turkish Swiss people =

This is a list of notable Swiss Turks.

== Academia ==
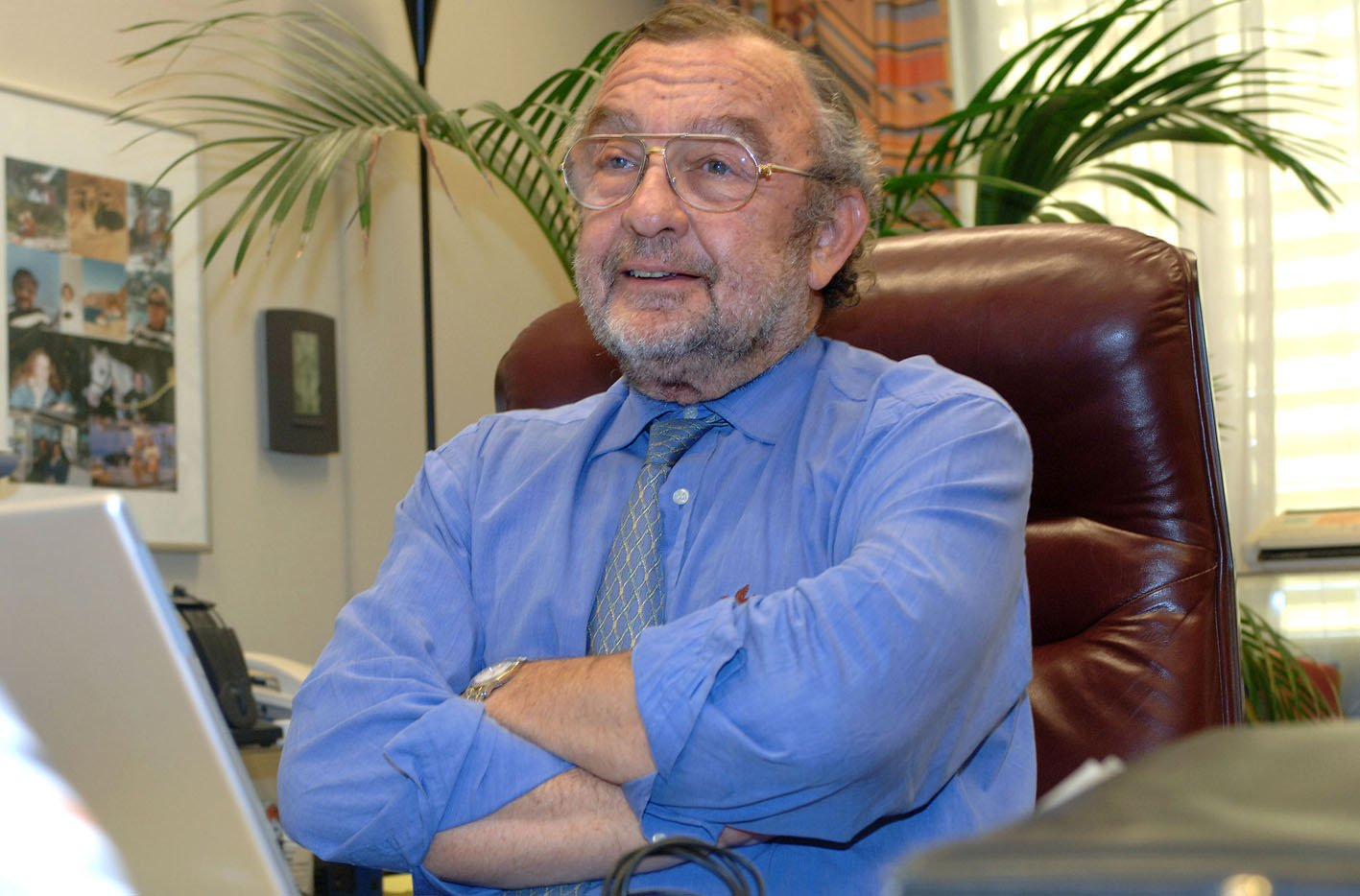
Murat Kunt.

- Hatice Altug, Professor of Bioengineering at the École Polytechnique Fédérale de Lausanne
- Cezmi Akdis, medical researcher in the field of immunology. He is director of the Swiss Institute of Allergy and Asthma Research
- Edhem Eldem, academician, historian
- Ataç İmamoğlu, physicist
- Murat Kunt, scientist
- Nesip Mustafa Merter, psychiatrist
- Salih Neftçi, Professor of Economics at the New School University (Turkish-Iraqi origin)
- Rosa Schupbach, economist (Turkish mother)
- Ulya Vogt-Göknil, architectural historian

== Arts and literature ==
- Jean-Luc Benoziglio, writer and publishing editor (Turkish father)
- Ata Bozaci, graphic designer, illustrator and artist
- Baydar Özcan, journalist and poet
- Gemma Salem, writer
- Ersoy Yıldırım, writer

== Business ==
- Dany Bahar, former CEO of Lotus Cars
- Haldun Kuru CFO of EUROFIMA
- Elif Sözen-Kohl, banker and daughter-in-law of former German Chancellor Helmut Kohl

== Cinema and television ==
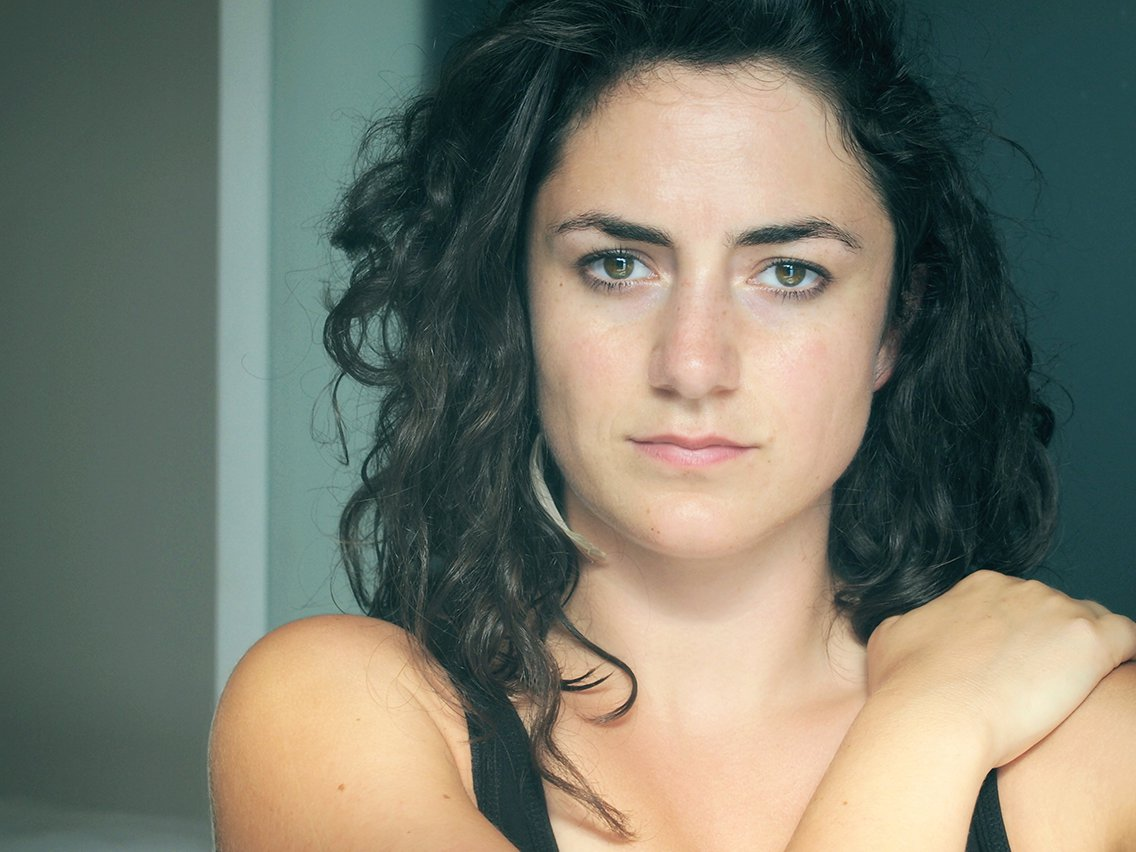
Suna Gürler.

- Gülsha Adilji, TV presenter (Turkish-Kosovar mother)
- Suna Gürler, director, actress and theatre educator
- Cihan Inan, film director and screenwriter
- Kaya Inan, film editor
- Esen Işık, director and screenwriter
- Güzin Kar, film director, screenwriter and columnist
- Baran bo Odar, film and television director and screenwriter (Turkish mother)
- Beren Tuna, actress (Turkish German origin)
- Lale Yavaş, actress
- Semih Yavsaner, comedian

== Design ==
- Yves Behar, industrial designer (Turkish father)
- Ezgi Cinar, fashion designer

== Music ==
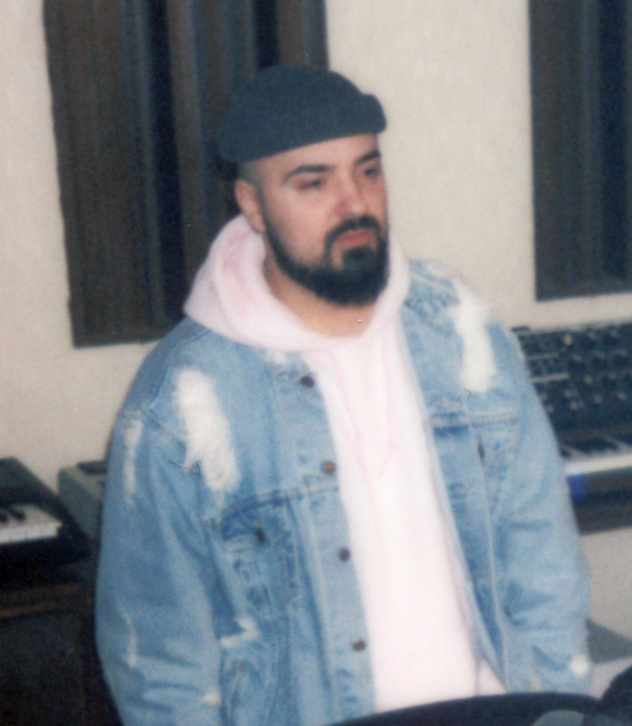
OZ.

- Erkan Aki, singer
- Emel Aykanat, singer
- Bendeniz, singer
- Sir Colin, DJ and house-music producer
- Fernando Corena, opera singer (Turkish father)
- Erdal Kızılçay, musician
- OZ, record producer
- Atilla Şereftuğ, songwriter
- Genç Osman Yavaş, singer
- Attila Vural, guitarist
- Ben Whale, singer, rapper and producer (Turkish mother and Swiss father)

== Politics ==
- Hasan Candan
- Talha Uğur Çamlıbel, member of the Greens
- Leyla Gül, co-Secretary General of the SP

== Religion ==
- Kerem Adigüzel, tafsir

== Sports ==
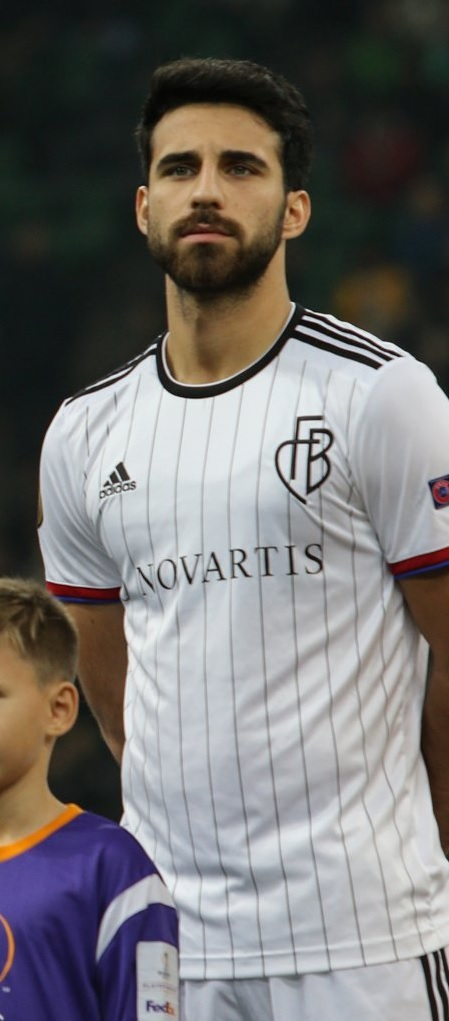
Eray Cömert.

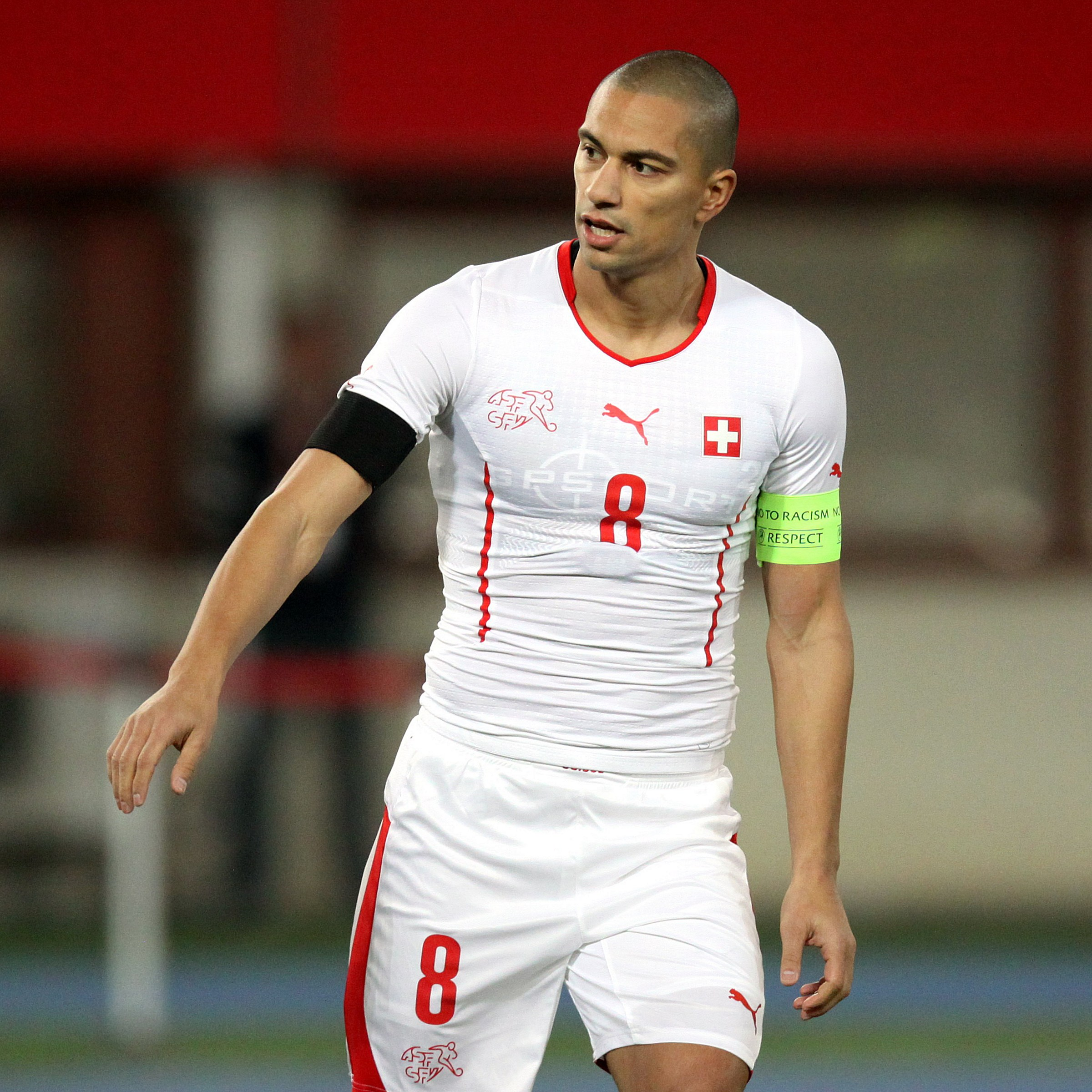
Gökhan Inler.

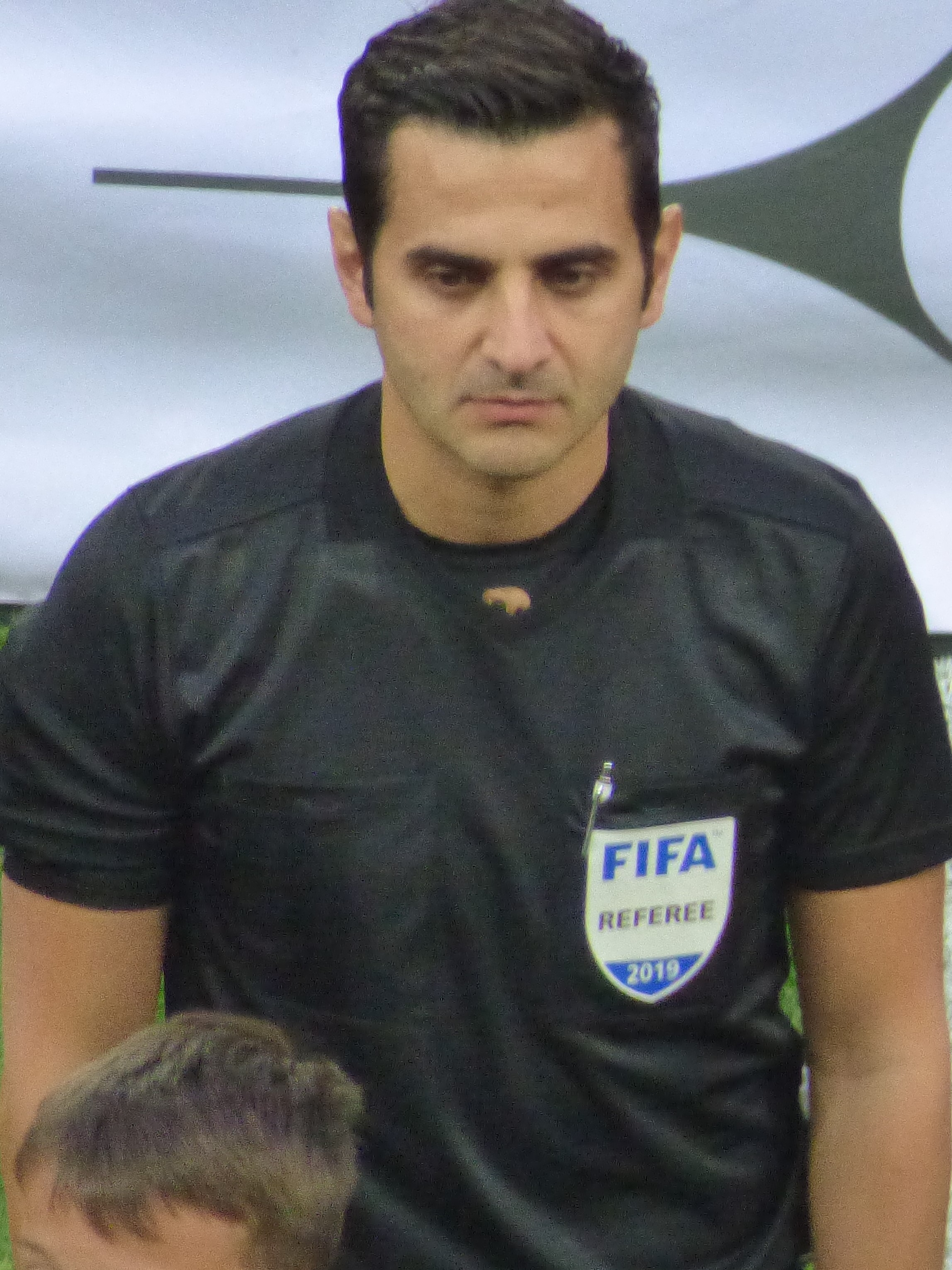
Fedayi San.

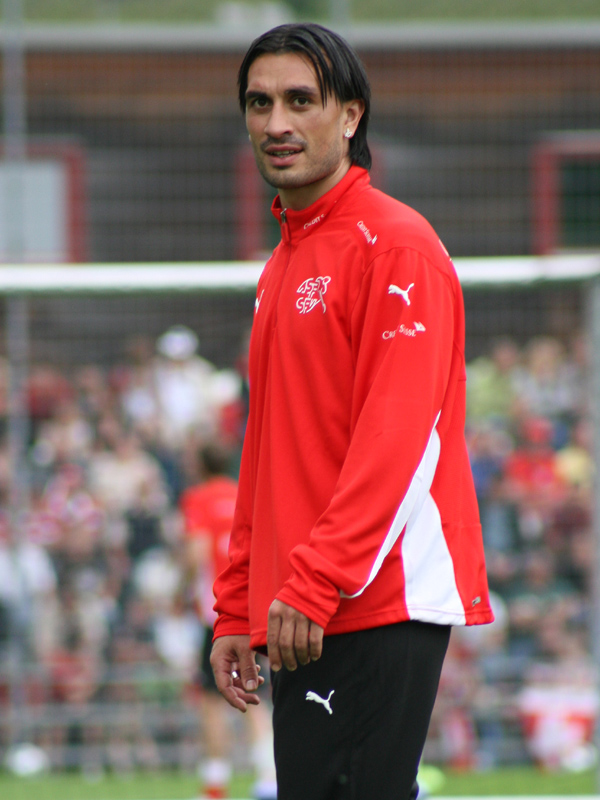
Hakan Yakin.

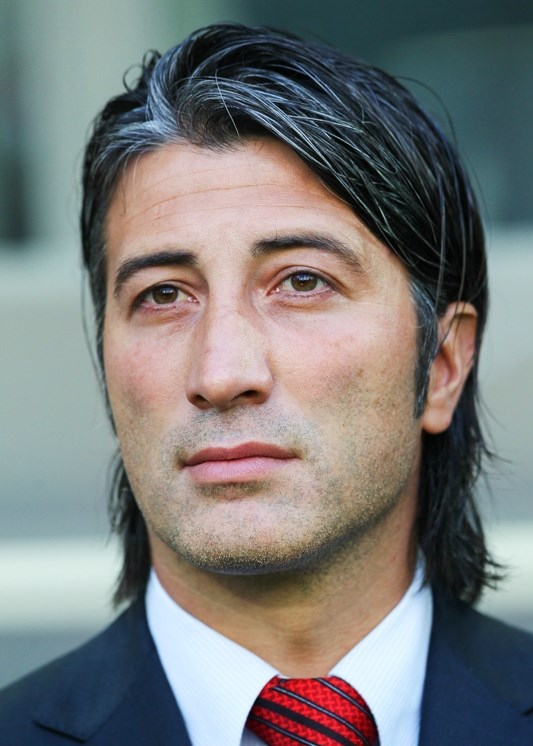
Murat Yakin.

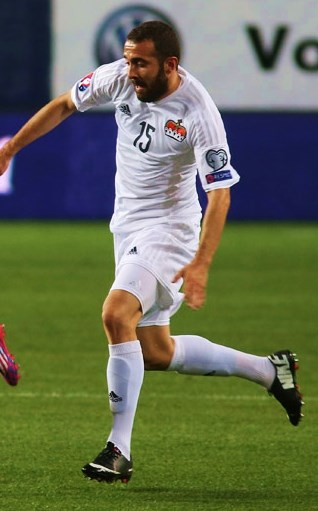
Seyhan Yildiz.

- Endoğan Adili, football player
- Harun Alpsoy, football player
- Diren Akdemir, football player
- Sinan Akdeniz, football player
- Zeki Amdouni, football player (Turkish father and Tunisian mother)
- Musa Araz, football player
- Ergün Berisha, football player
- Cengiz Biçer, football player
- Önder Çengel, football player
- Tunahan Cicek, football player
- Eray Cömert, football player
- Ferhat Çökmüş, football player
- Hakan Demirci, football player
- Fatih Doğan, football player
- Siyar Doldur, football player
- Burak Eris, football player
- Kerim Frei, football player
- Levent Gülen, football player
- Samet Gunduz, football player
- Ali İmren, football player
- Gökhan Inler, football player
- Enes Kanter, basketball player
- Ertan Irizik, football player
- Serkan Izmirlioglu, football player
- Erhan Kavak, football player
- David Deniz Kılınç, football player
- David Kılınç, football player
- Baykal Kulaksızoğlu, football player
- Berkan Kutlu, football player
- Deniz Mendi, football player
- Ahmet Özcan, football player
- Attila Sahin, football player
- Ercüment Şahin, football player
- Serkan Şahin, football player
- Fedayi San, FIFA football referee
- Dilaver Satılmış, football player
- Matteus Senkal, football player
- Gürkan Sermeter, football player
- Berkay Sülüngöz, football player
- Özkan Taştemur, football player
- Emir Tombul, football player
- İlker Tugal, football player
- Kubilay Türkyilmaz, football players
- Necip Ugras, football player
- Murat Ural, football player
- Hakan Yakin, football player
- Murat Yakin, football player
- Ursal Yasar, football player
- Seyhan Yildiz, football player

== See also ==
- Turks in Switzerland
- List of Swiss people
