= Turks in Liechtenstein =

Total population
- 1,000 (2009 estimate); Approximately 3% of the country's total population

Regions with significant populations
- Vaduz; Schaan; Triesen

Languages
- Turkish; German

Religion
- Predominantly Sunni Islam

Turks in Liechtenstein (German: Türken in Liechtenstein; Turkish: Lihtenştayn'daki Türkler) refers to ethnic Turkish people who have migrated to Liechtenstein as well as the growing Liechtenstein-born community with full or partial Turkish origins. The majority of Liechtensteiner Turks descend from the Republic of Turkey; however, there has also been Turkish migration waves from other post-Ottoman countries, including ethnic Turkish communities which have come from the Balkans, the island of Cyprus, as well as from other parts of the Levant. In addition, there has been migration to Liechtenstein from the Turkish diaspora; for example, Turkish-Austrians, Turkish-Germans, and Turkish-Swiss people have arrived in Liechtenstein as Austrian, German, and Swiss citizens.

== Population ==
Official data published by Liechtenstein only collects data on the country of birth and does not provide data on ethnicity. Consequently, the 609 people recorded as Turkish citizens in 2017 does not provide a true reflection of the total ethnic Turkish population. Firstly, the number of ethnic Turkish communities which have arrived in Liechtenstein from the Balkans, Cyprus, etc., as well as from the diaspora (e.g. Austria, Germany, and Switzerland), are recorded according to their citizenship, such as "Austrian", "Cypriot", "German", "Swiss" etc. rather than by their Turkish ethnicity. Secondly, official data does not take into account naturalised citizens or the growing Liechtenstein-born community of Turkish origin. In 2009 there were approximately 1,000 people of Turkish origin living in Liechtenstein. Approximately 3% of the country's total population was of Turkish origin in 2016.

== Notable people ==
- Cengiz Biçer, played for the Liechtenstein national football team (Turkish Swiss origin)
- Burak Eris, plays for the Liechtenstein national football team (Turkish Swiss origin)
- Olcay Gür, plays for the Liechtenstein national football team
- Ridvan Kardesoglu, plays for the Liechtenstein national football team
- Kayar Metin, karateka and kickboxer (Turkish Swiss origin)
- Ferhat Saglam, football player
- Seyhan Yildiz, plays for the Liechtenstein national football team (Turkish Swiss origin)

== See also ==
- Demographics of Liechtenstein
- Turks in Europe
  - Turks in Austria
  - Turks in Germany
  - Turks in Switzerland

== Bibliography ==
- Fürstentum Liechtenstein (2017), Bevölkerungsstatistik (PDF), Fürstentum Liechtenstein
