= Turks in Switzerland =

Ethnic group in Switzerland

Total population
- 74,379 (2023 estimate)

Regions with significant populations
- Zurich; Basel; Lausanne

Languages
- Turkish, French, German and Italian

Religion
- Predominantly Sunni Islam; Minority Alevism, Christianity, other religions, or irreligious

Turks in Switzerland (Turkish: İsviçre'deki Türkler), also referred to as Swiss Turks (Turkish: İsviçreli Türkler) and Turkish Swiss people (Turkish: Türk İsviçreliler), are Swiss residents of Turkish origin. The majority of Swiss Turks descend from the Republic of Turkey; however there has also been Turkish migration waves from other post-Ottoman countries including ethnic Turkish communities which have come to Switzerland from the Balkans (e.g. from Bulgaria, Greece, Kosovo, North Macedonia and Romania), the island of Cyprus, and more recently Iraq and Syria.

== History ==
Turks first began to arrive in Switzerland in the 1960s due to increased economic opportunities. Unlike Germany and France, where emigration from Turkey was based on prior agreements, most Turks began to move to Switzerland on their own volition. Following the Kurdish-Turkish conflict, many began to flee to the country for political asylum, particularly Turkish nationals of Kurdish ethnicity.

== Culture ==
=== Religion ===
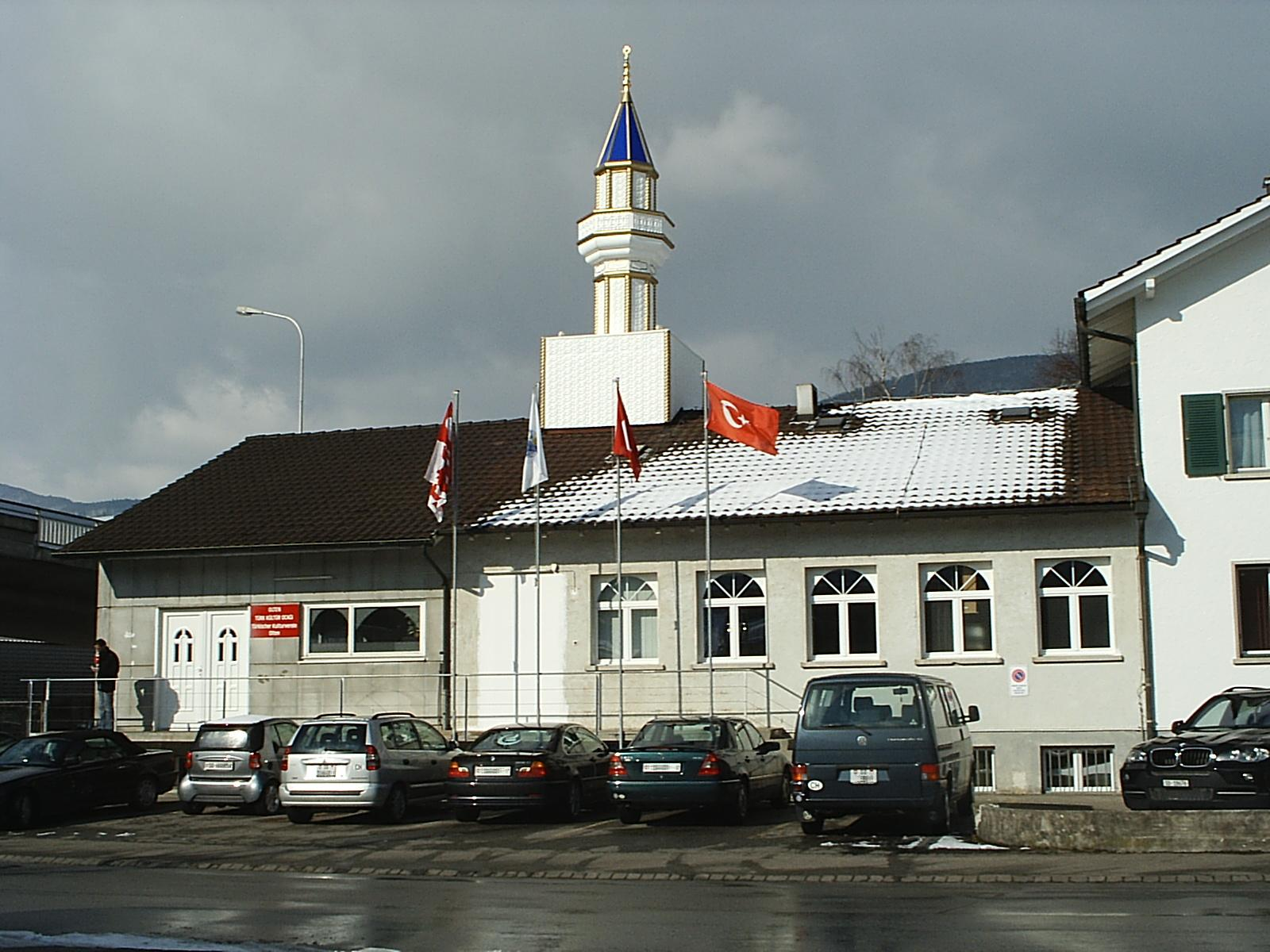
Mosque of the Olten Turkish cultural association, Wangen bei Olten.

The majority of the Turkish community in Switzerland adhere to Islam. However, their religious organisations differ from those of other Muslim communities in the country. The Turks are divided by ideological and political divisions of their home country. When in the 1970s the Islamic movement Millî Görüş was established in Germany for the German Turkish community, some of the Turks in Switzerland joined this organisation. But the activities of the Diyanet İşleri Türk İslam Birliği, the Turkish directorate of religious affairs that sends Imams to the Turkish diaspora, attracted other Turks to adhere to this state-controlled form of Islam. Turkish groups such as the Sufi Suleymancilar and the Nurcu confraternity also play a role in the Turkish Muslim community in Switzerland. These are exact Gulen Movement people, different from the current Turkey's Government, after the 15 July Turkey's coup d'état attempt purges.

== Discrimination ==
In 2005, a study showed that second-generation Turks were one-third less likely to find work compared to those with a Swiss passport, despite having equal qualifications based on education.

On 17 March 2021 supporters of the PKK group attacked the home of Şeref Yıldız, the head of the Swiss Turkish Society (ITT), for the fifth time in two years, forcing him to move to another residence to protect his children.

By 29 April 2021, a bomb ready to explode was found in the mailbox of the headquarters of the Swiss Turkish Society (ITT), which serves as the umbrella group of Turkish nongovernmental organizations (NGOs) in the Rumlang region. Police evacuated the entrance and exit of the town. It was suspected that the PKK group were behind the attack because, for several months, there had been attacks by PKK supporters against the headquarters and institutions belonging to the Turkish community in Switzerland.

== Notable people ==
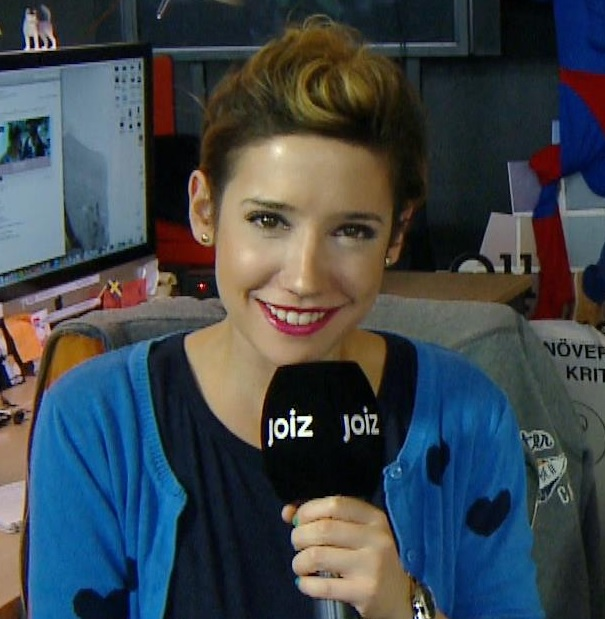
Gülsha Adilji, TV presenter

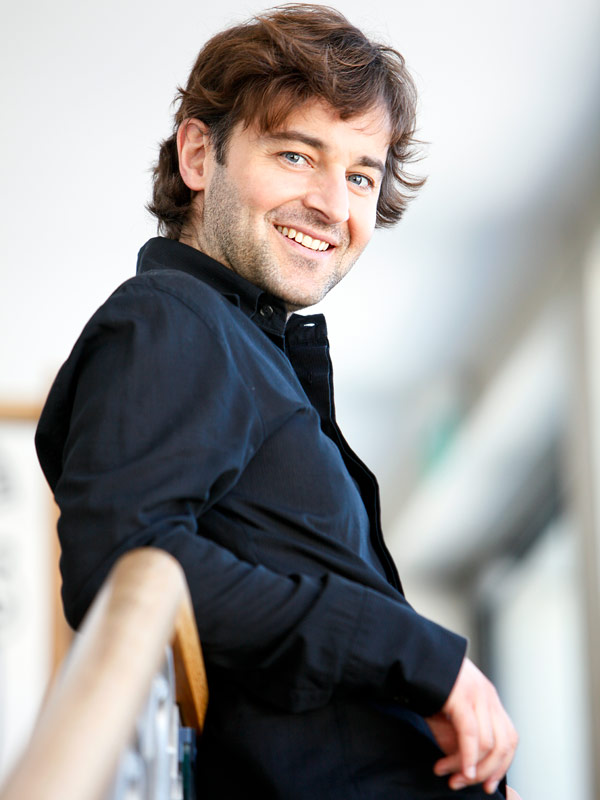
Erkan Aki, opera singer and pop musician

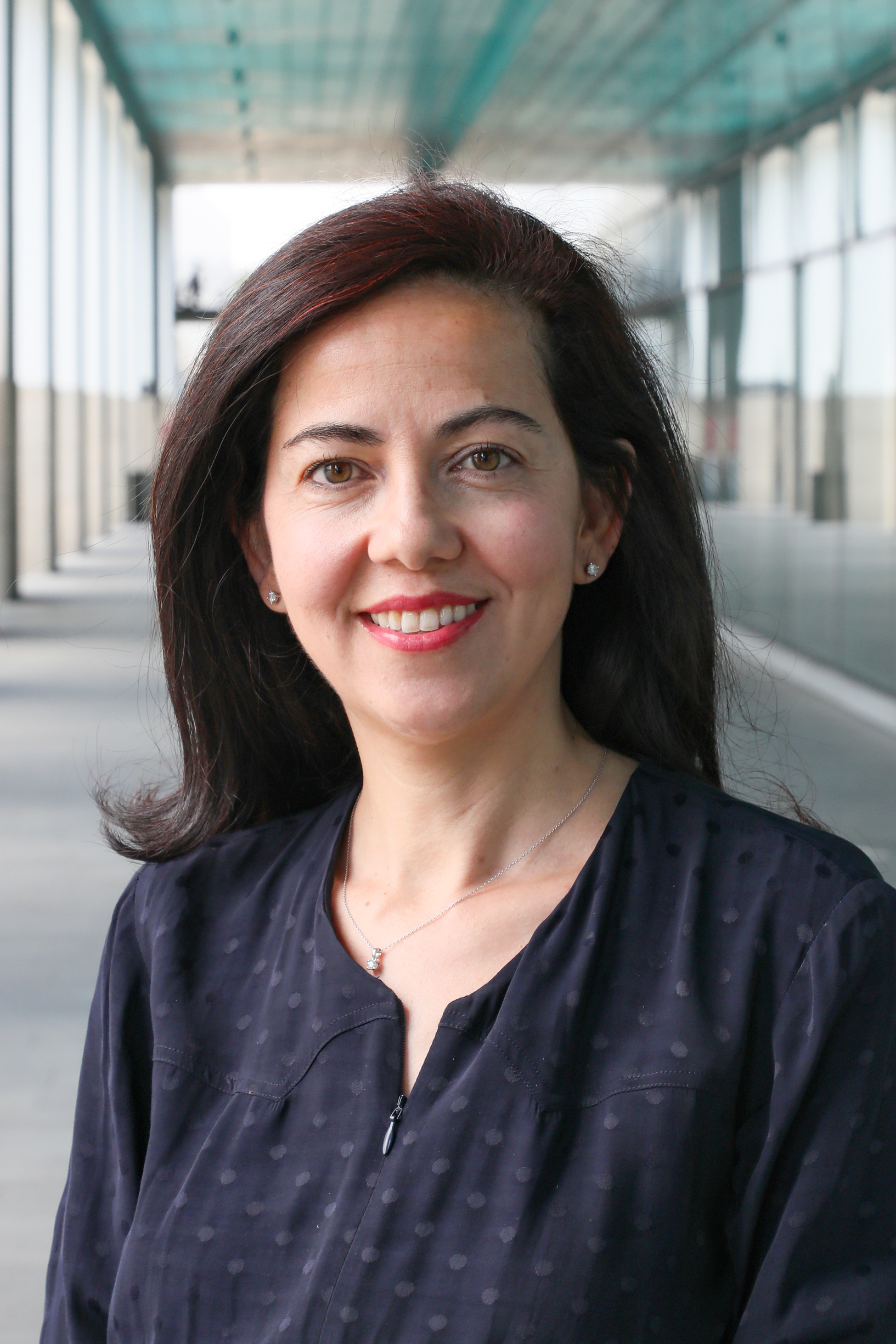
Professor Hatice Altug, physicist

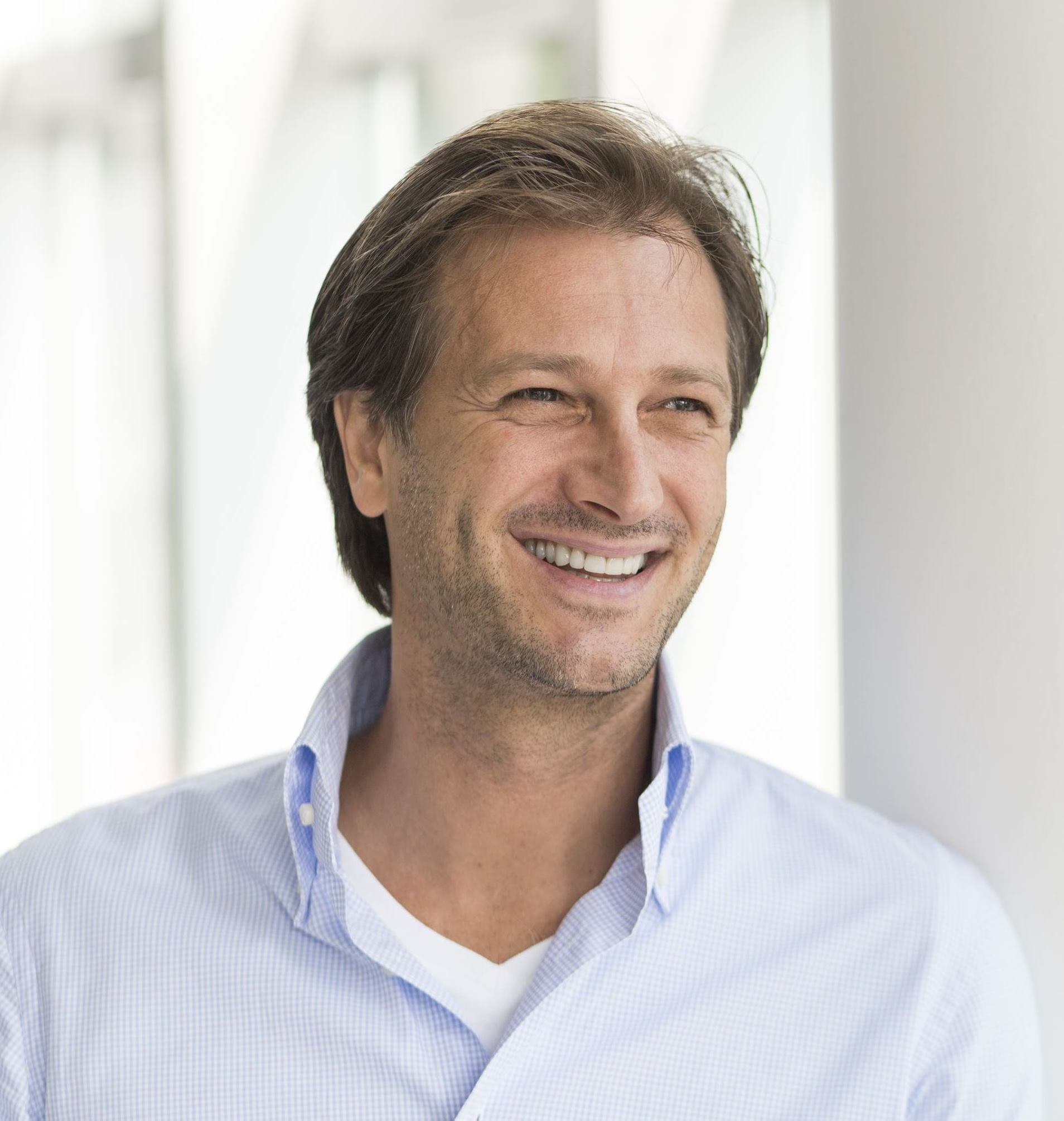
Dany Bahar, business executive

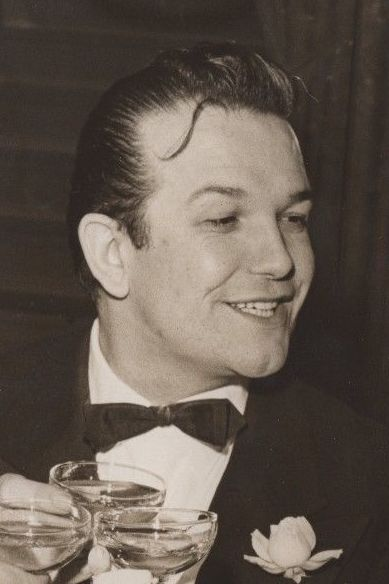
Fernando Corena, opera singer

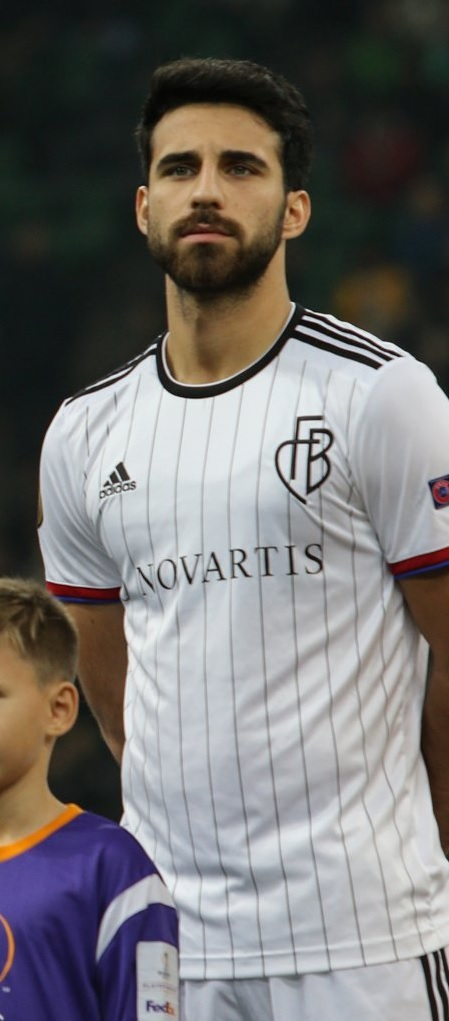
Eray Cömert, football player

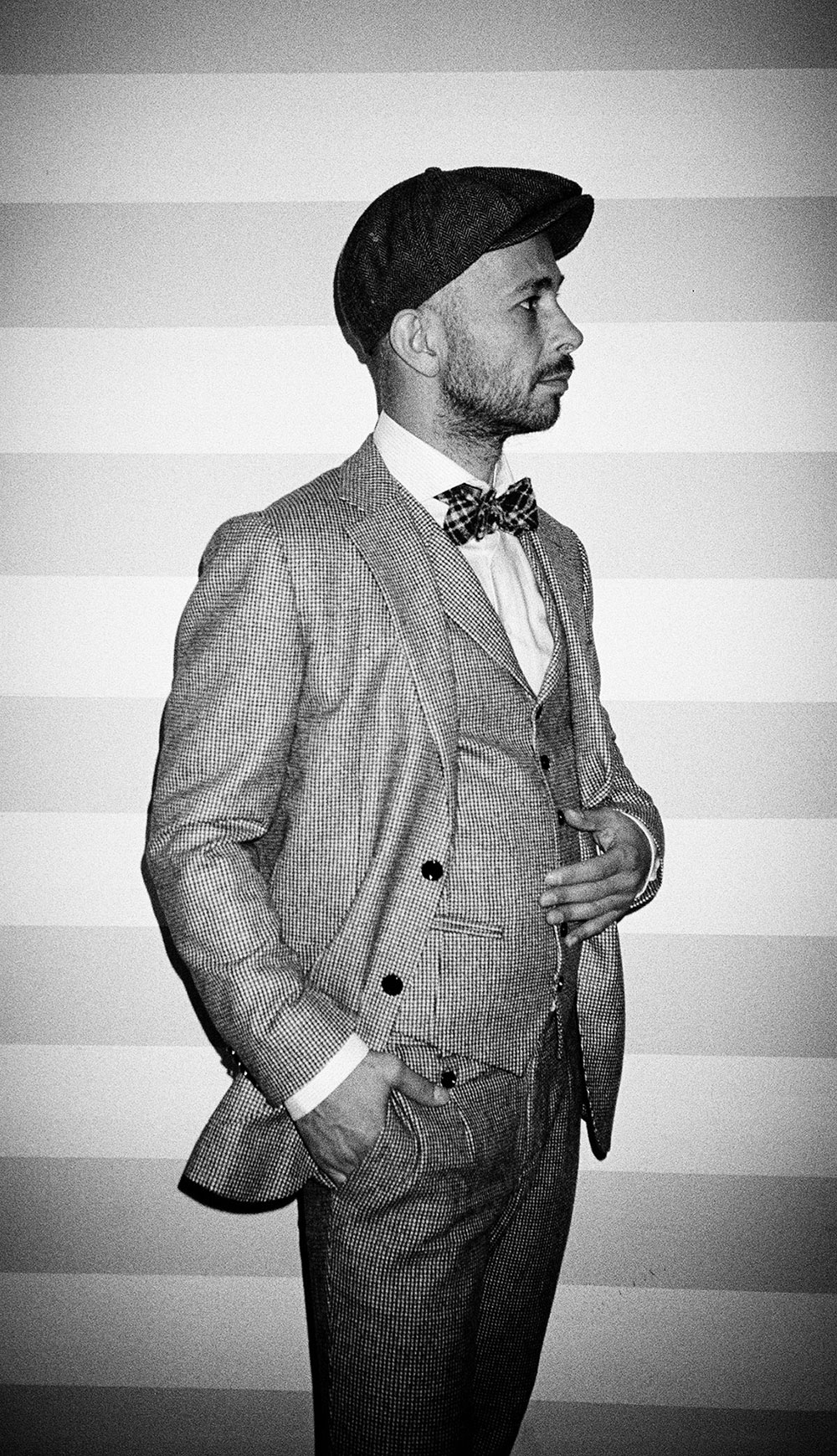
Ata Bozaci, artist

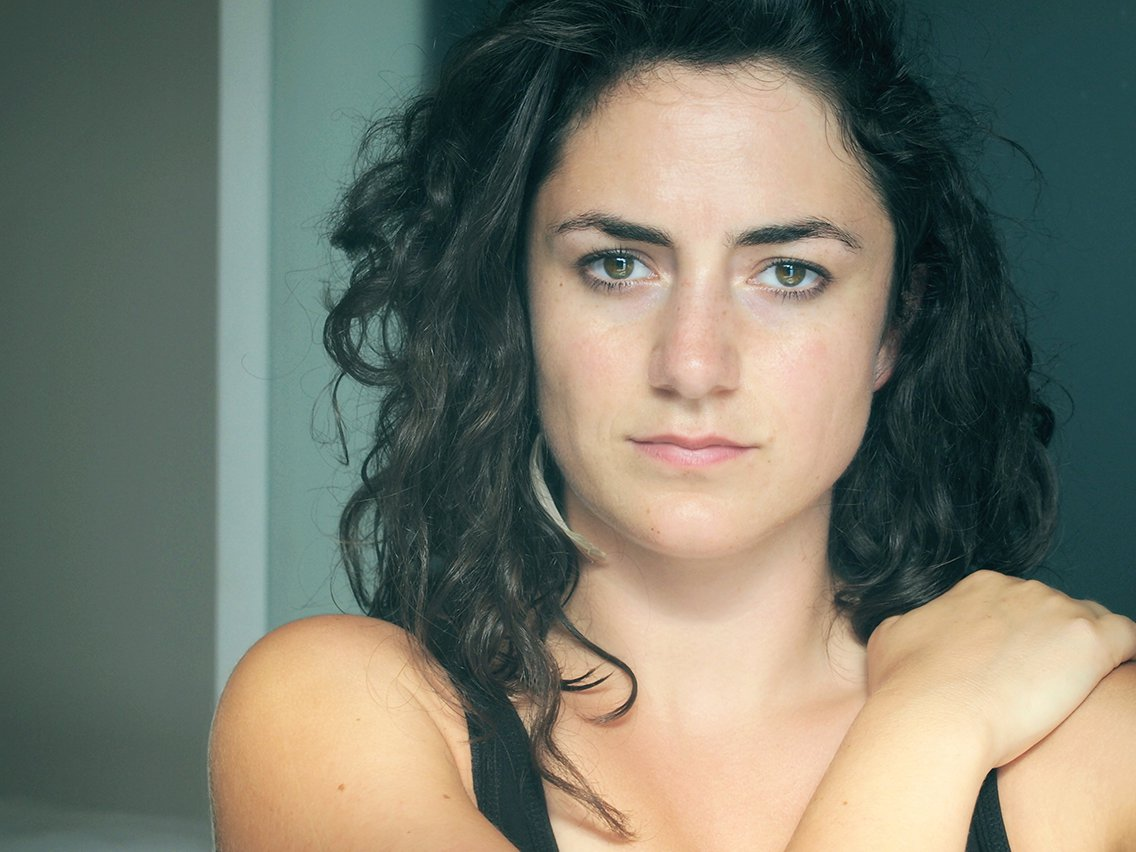
Suna Gürler, actress

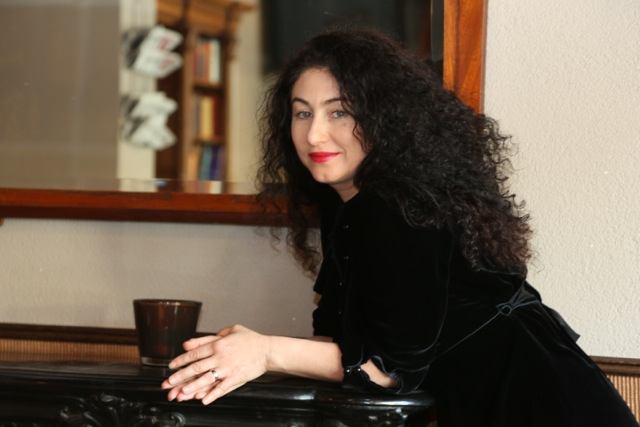
Güzin Kar, film director

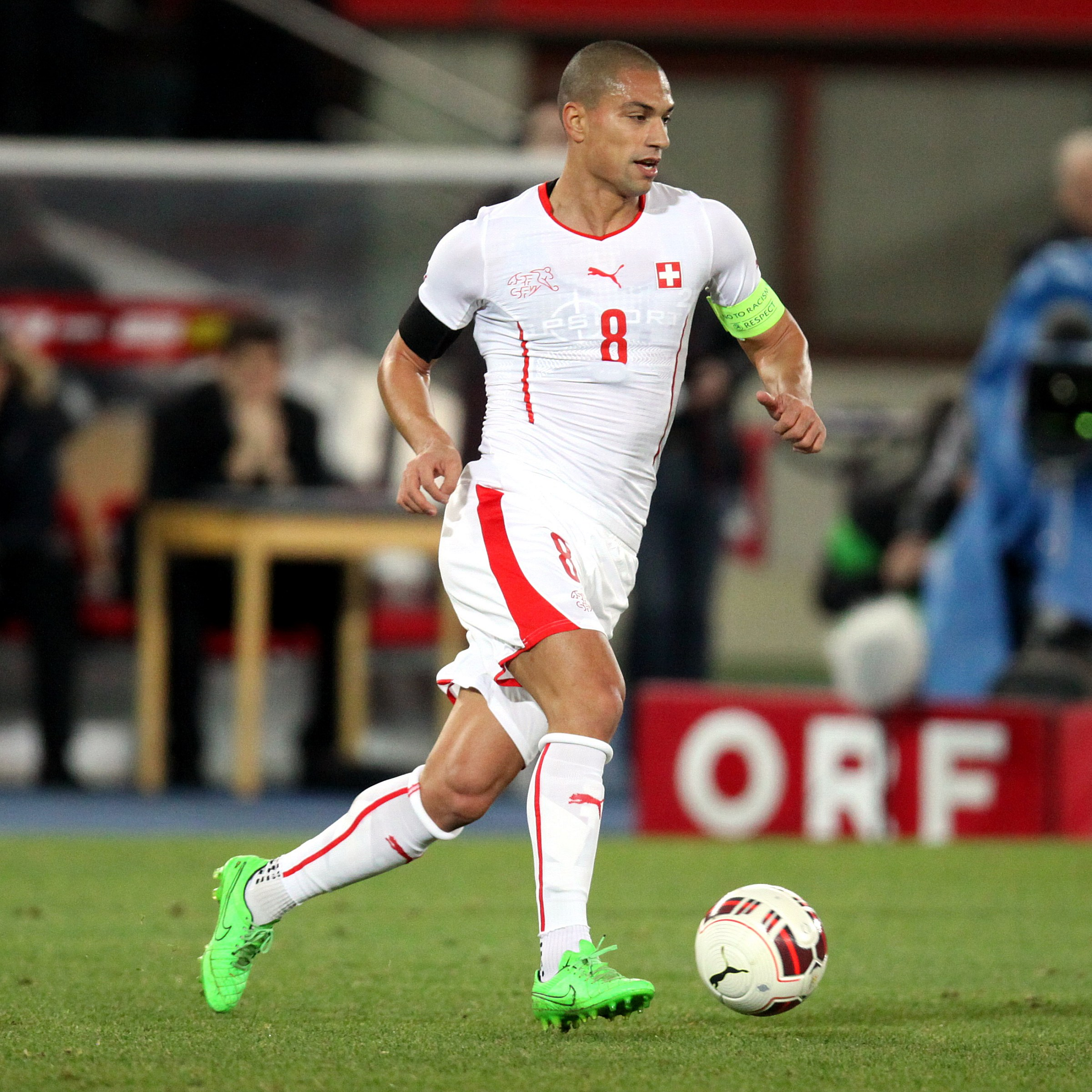
Gökhan Inler, football player

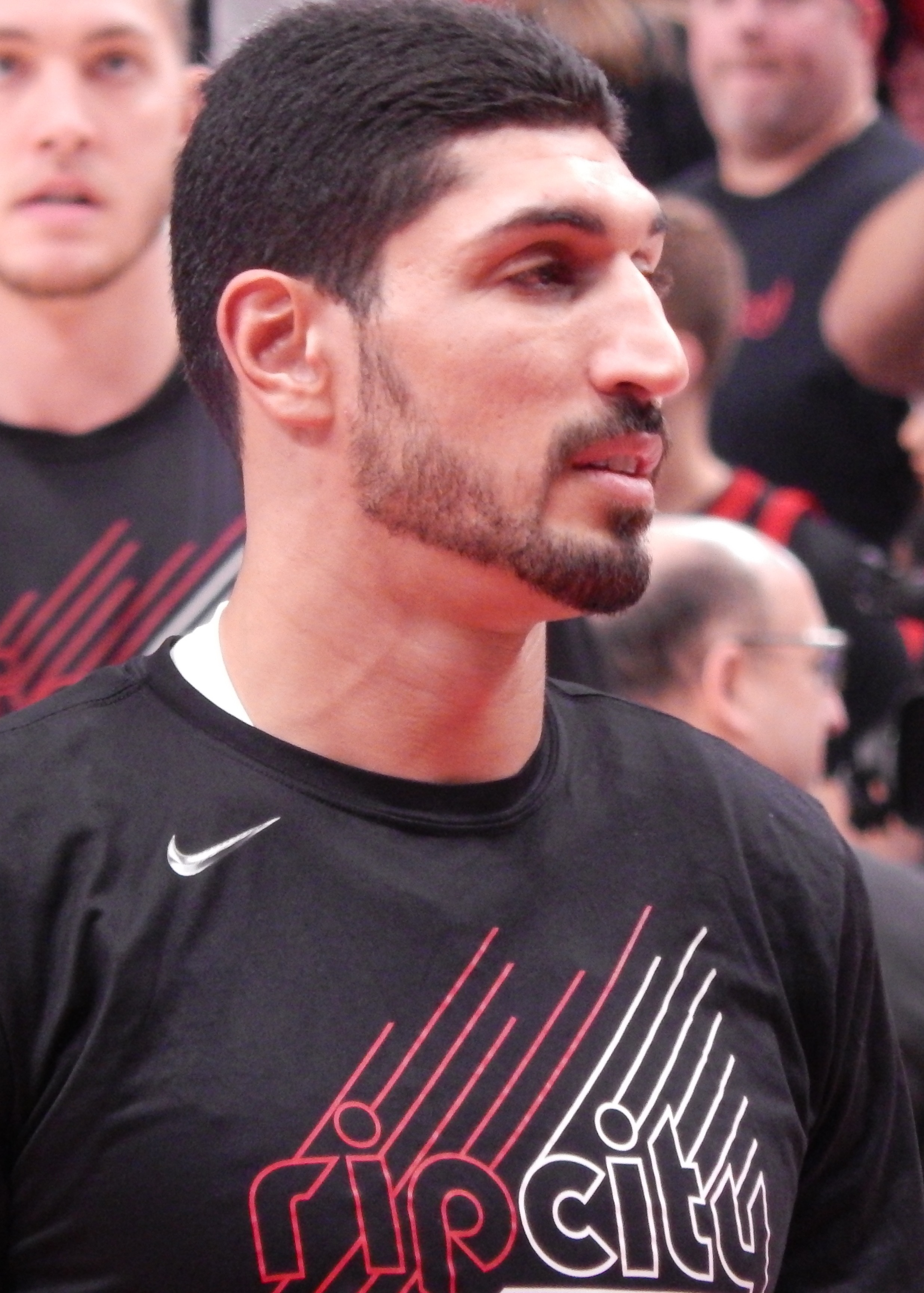
Enes Kanter, basketball player

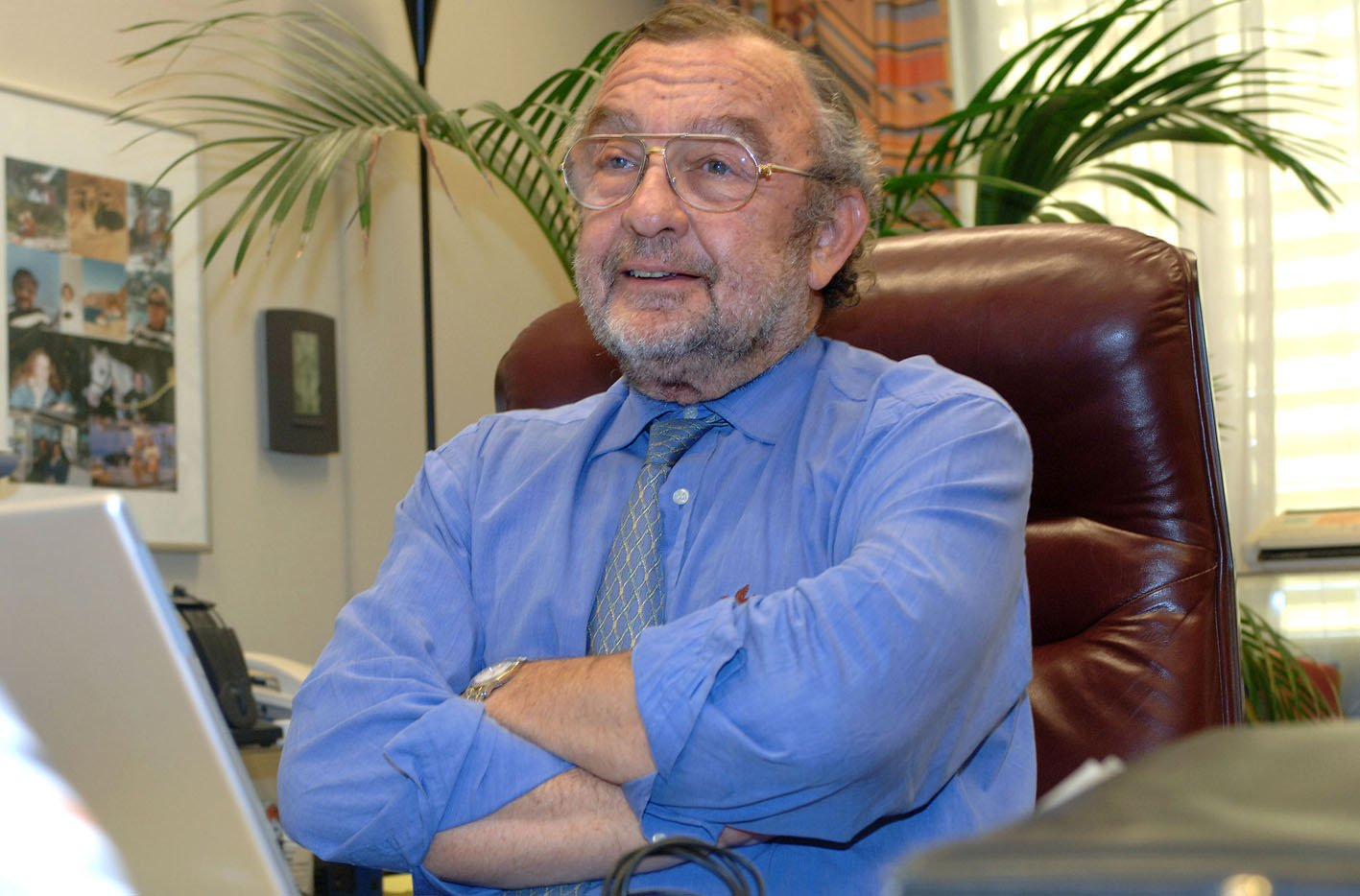
Professor Murat Kunt, scientist

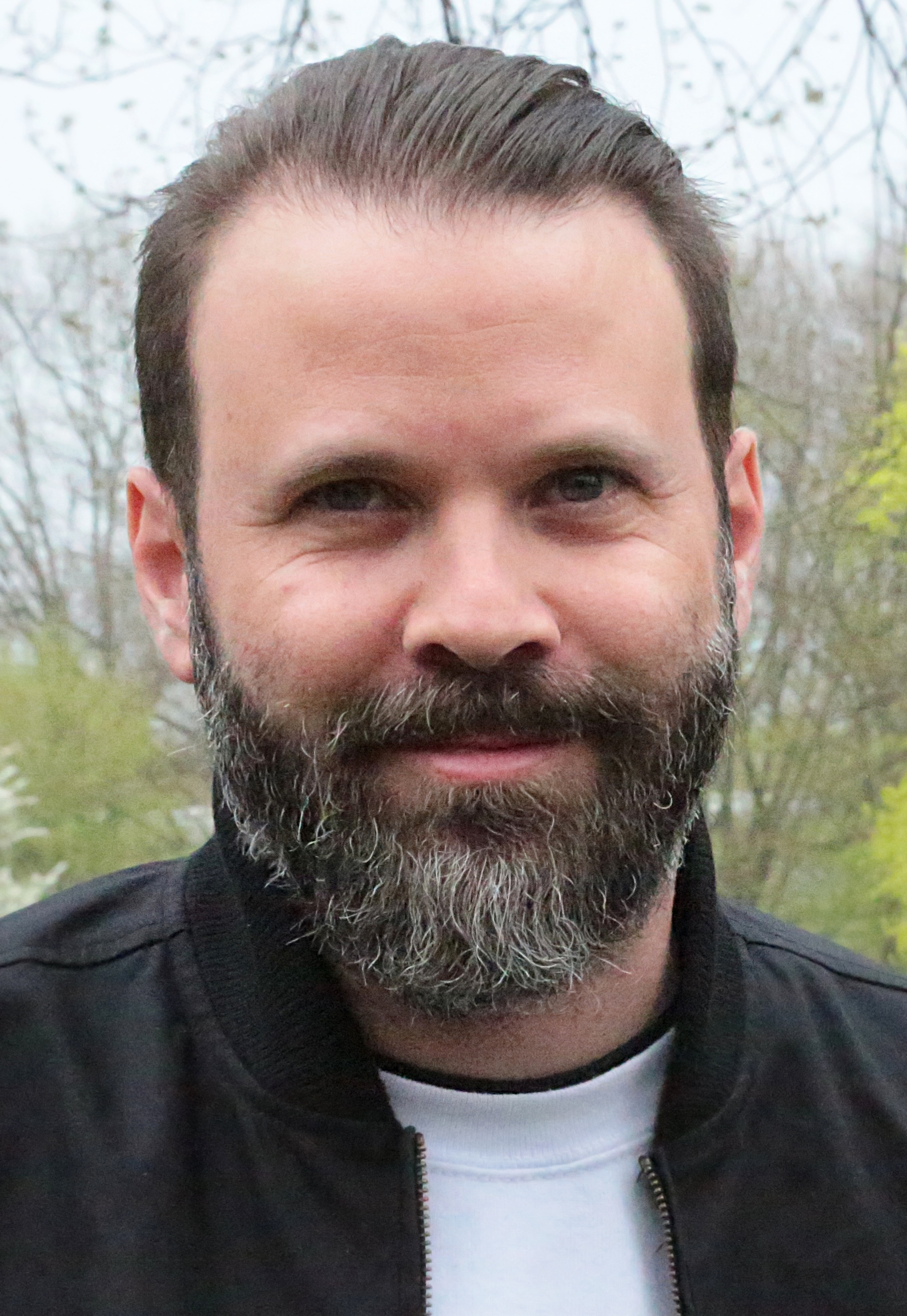
Baran bo Odar, film director

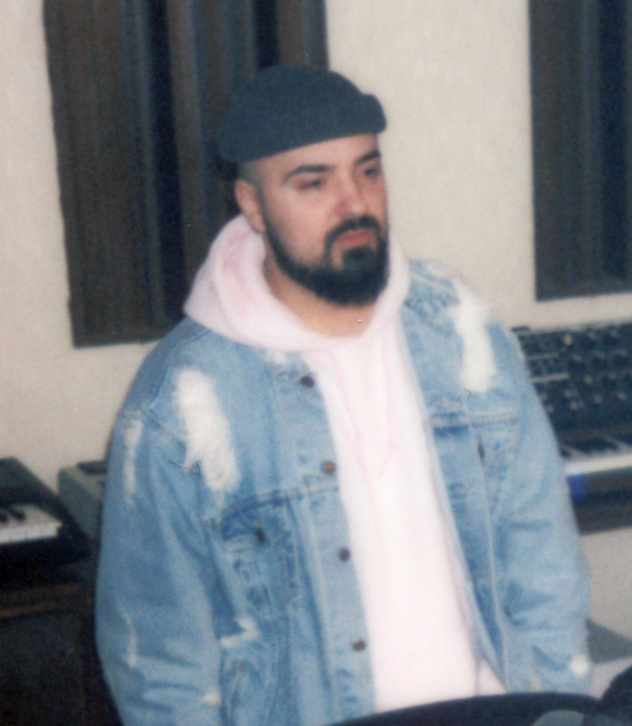
OZ, record producer and songwriter

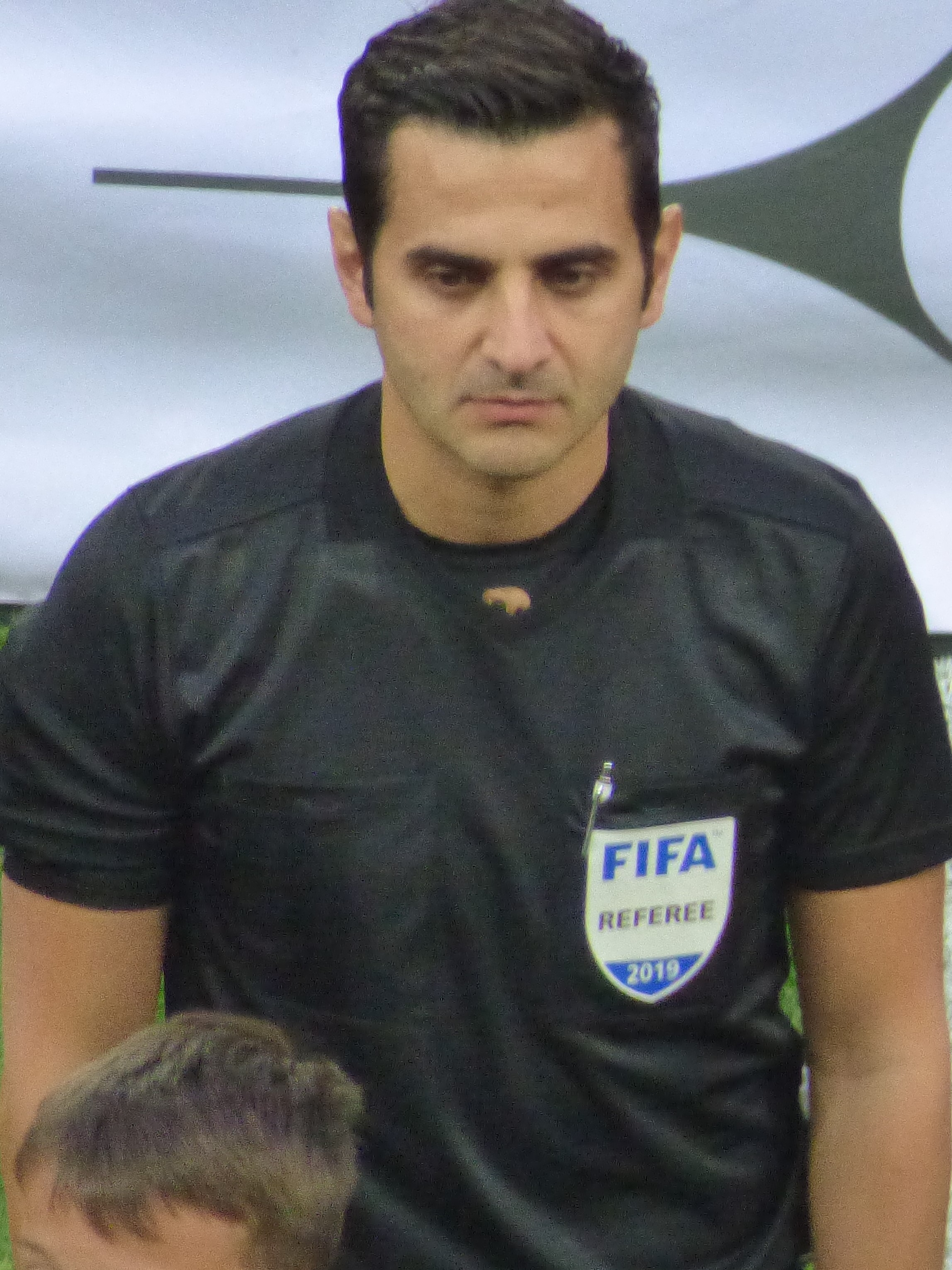
Fedayi San, FIFA football referee

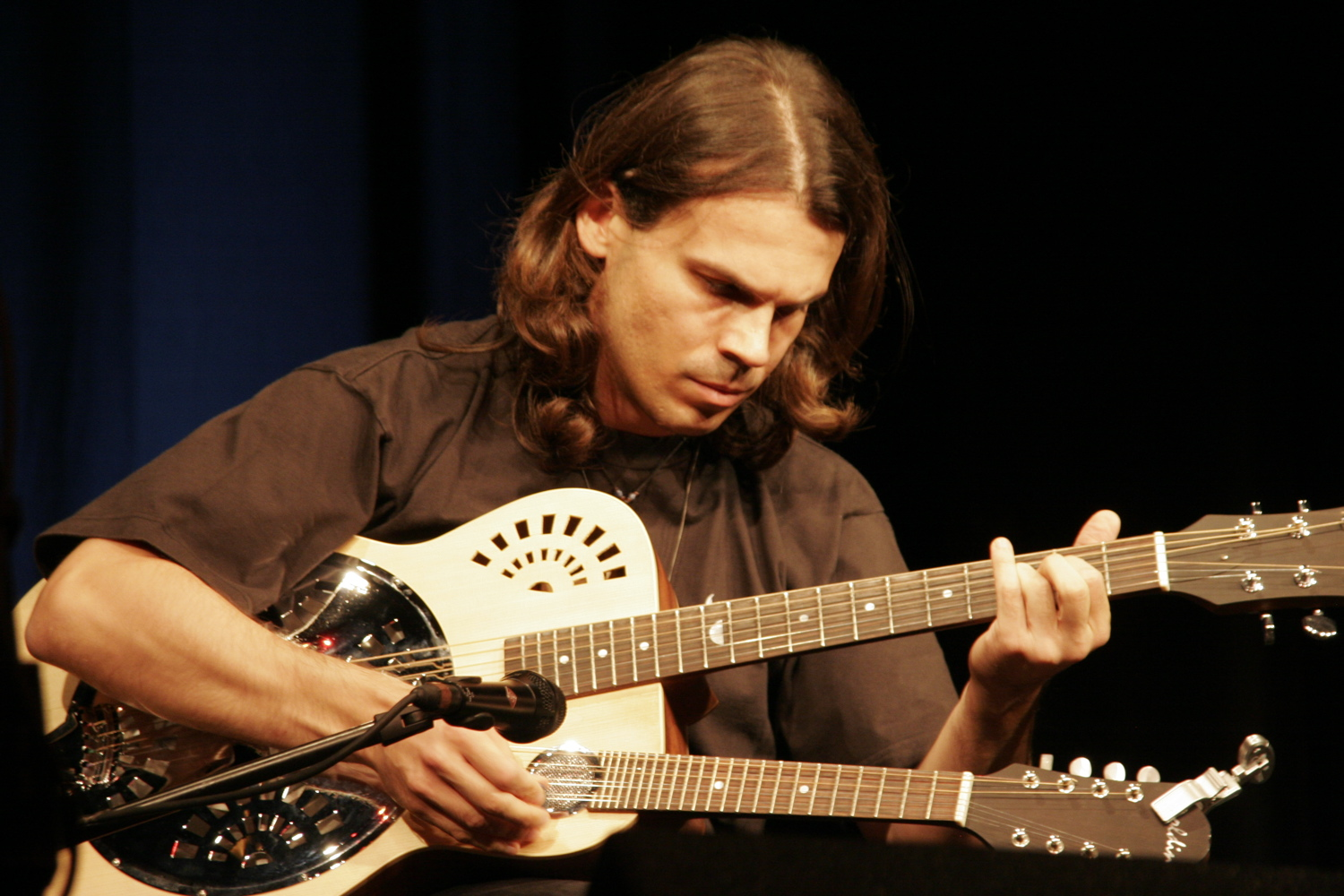
Attila Vural, guitarist

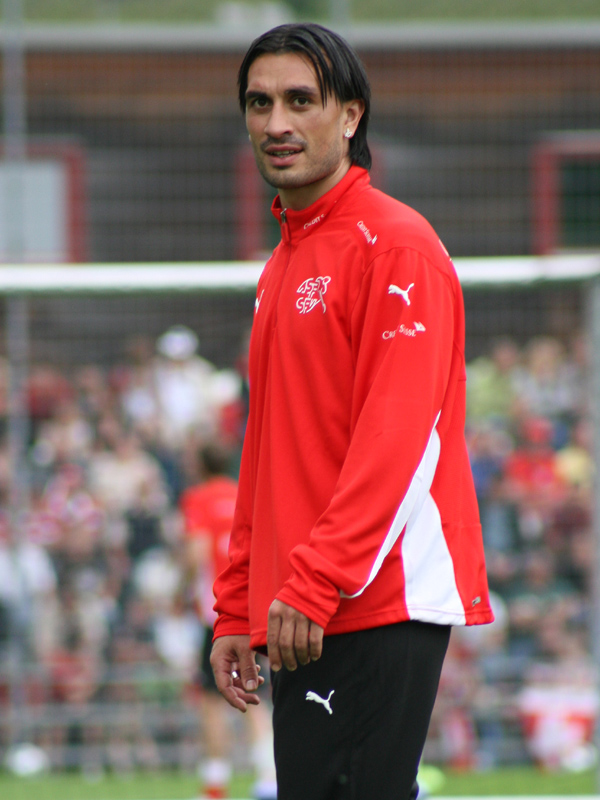
Hakan Yakin, football player

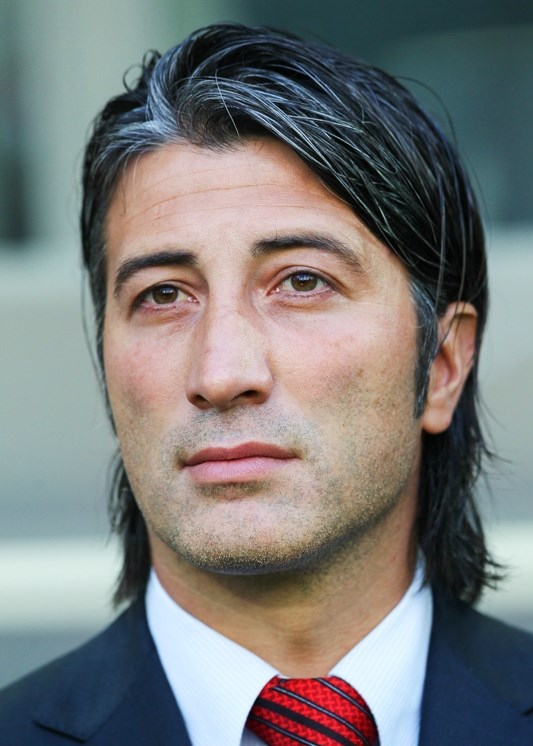
Murat Yakin, football player

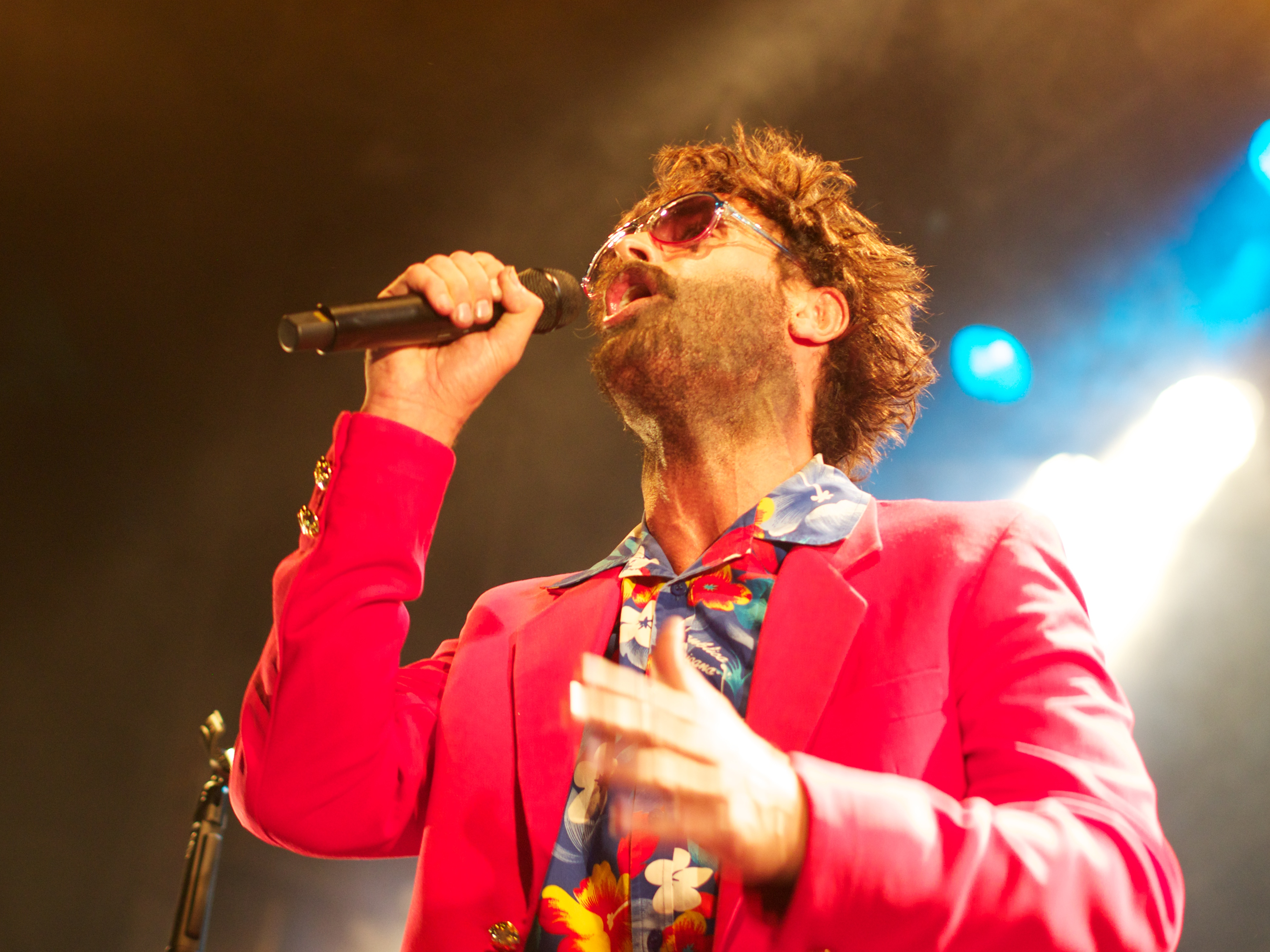
Semih Yavsaner, comedian and entertainer

== Turkic Swiss ==
- Aga Khan III Mother Nawab A'lia Shams ol-Moluk, a granddaughter of Fath-Ali Shah Qajar from Bayat (tribe)
- Aga Khan IV Descent from Fath Ali Shah from Bayat (tribe)

== See also ==
- List of Turkish Swiss people
- Switzerland–Turkey relations
- Turks in Europe
  - Turks in Austria
  - Turks in Germany
  - Turks in France
  - Turks in Italy
  - Turks in Liechtenstein

== Bibliography ==
- Haddad, Yvonne Yazbeck (2002). Muslims in the West: from sojourners to citizens. Oxford University Press. ISBN 0-19-514805-3..
- Organisation for Economic Co-operation and Development (2008). International Migration Outlook: SOPEMI 2008. OECD Publishing. ISBN 978-92-64-04565-1..
