= Candan =

Candan is a feminine Turkish given name. Notable people with the name include:

== People ==
=== Given name ===
- Candan Erçetin (born 1963), Turkish female singer, songwriter
- Candan Yüceer (born 1973), Turkish politician

=== Surname ===
- Berkay Candan (born 1993), Turkish basketball player
- Fatih Candan (born 1989), Turkish-German footballer
- Hasan Candan (born 1985), Swiss politician
