= Demographics of Liechtenstein =

Demographic features of the population of Liechtenstein include population density, ethnicity, education level, health of the populace, economic status, religious affiliations and other aspects of the population.

The population of Liechtenstein as of August 2026 was 40,435. It is ranked #214 in world population.Liechtenstein is the fourth smallest country in Europe, after Vatican City, Monaco, and San Marino. Its population is primarily ethnic Alemannic, although a third of its resident population are foreign nationals, primarily German speakers from the Federal Republic of Germany, Austria, and the Swiss Confederation, other Swiss, Italians, and Turks. Nationals are referred to by the plural: Liechtensteiners.

The official language is German; most speak Alemannic, a German dialect highly divergent from Standard German, but closely related to those dialects spoken in neighbouring regions. In Triesenberg a quite distinct dialect promoted by the municipality is spoken. According to the 2000 census, 87.9% of the population is Christian, of which 76% adhere to the Roman Catholic faith, while about 7% are Protestant. The religious affiliation for most of the remainder is Islam - 4.8%, undeclared - 4.1%, and no religion - 2.8%. The median age of citizens is 44.7 years.

== Population size and structure ==
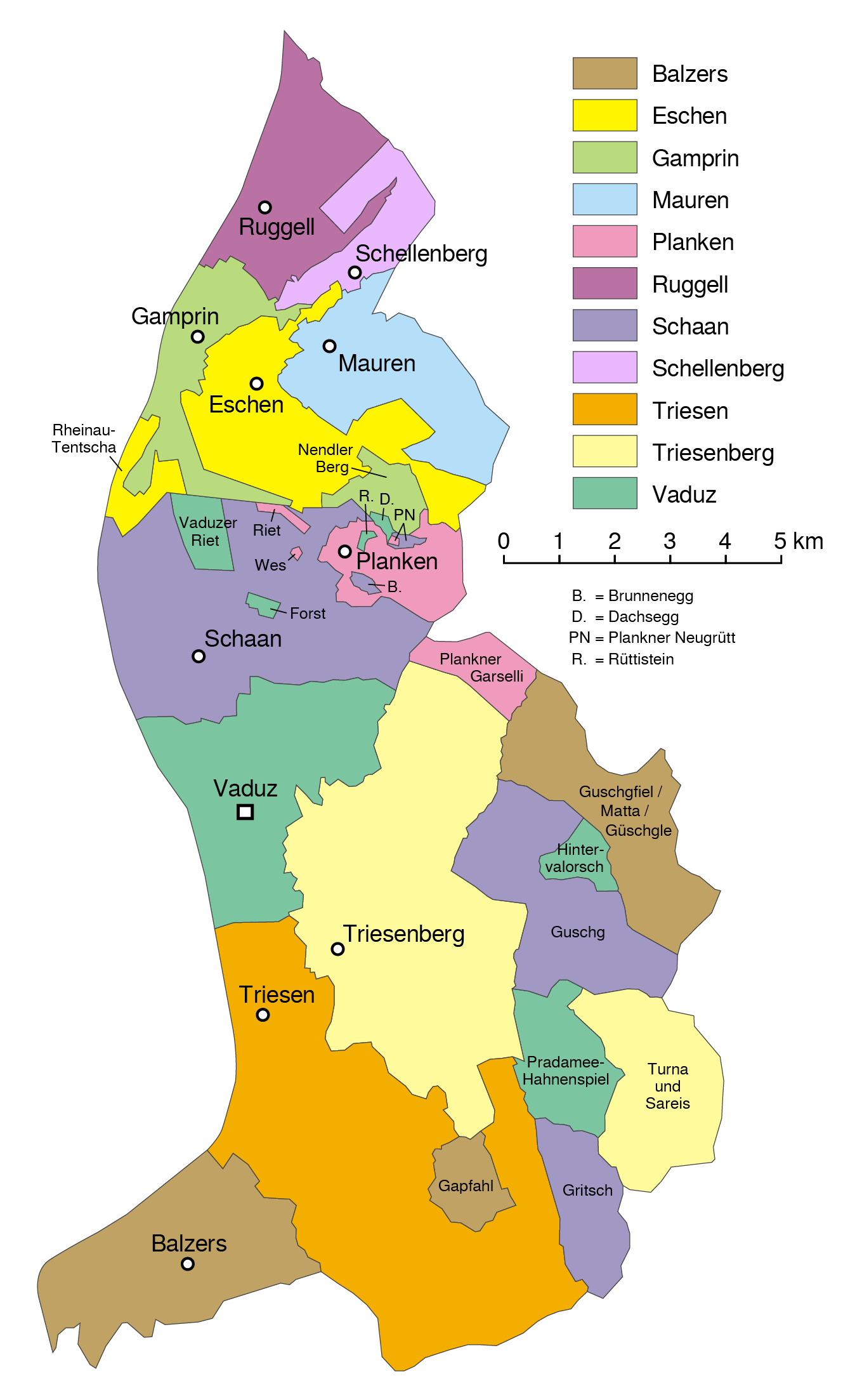
Administrative divisions of Liechtenstein.

=== Age structure of the population ===
Population Estimates by Sex and Age Group (01.I.2021)

Age group	Male	Female	Total	%
Total	19 368	19 687	39 055	100
0–4	964	933	1 897	4.86
5–9	1 017	870	1 887	4.83
10–14	1 018	893	1 911	4.89
15–19	1 004	962	1 966	5.03
20–24	1 064	1 089	2 153	5.51
25–29	1 189	1 141	2 330	5.97
30–34	1 230	1 237	2 467	6.32
35–39	1 273	1 270	2 543	6.51
40–44	1 319	1 278	2 597	6.65
45–49	1 364	1 467	2 831	7.25
50–54	1 629	1 640	3 269	8.37
55–59	1 565	1 600	3 165	8.10
60–64	1 355	1 403	2 758	7.06
65-69	1 085	1 141	2 226	5.70
70-74	967	989	1 956	5.01
75-79	701	789	1 490	3.82
80-84	392	518	910	2.33
85-89	175	303	478	1.22
90-94	54	125	179	0.46
95-99	1	36	37	0.09
100-104	2	3	5	0.01
Age group	Male	Female	Total	Percent
0–14	2 999	2 696	5 695	14.58
15–64	12 992	13 087	26 079	66.78
65+	3 377	3 904	7 281	18.64

=== 2019 ===
Resident population by municipalities as of 30 June 2019.

Municipality/district	Resident population
Vaduz	5,668
Triesen	5,230
Balzers	4,628
Triesenberg	2,643
Schaan	5,998
Planken	478
Eschen	4,459
Mauren	4,404
Gamprin	1,663
Ruggell	2,295
Schellenberg	1,091
Liechtenstein	38,557

66.2% are Liechtensteiners, the rest are foreigners.

Vital statistics since 1901
	Average population	Live births	Deaths	Natural change	Crude birth rate (per 1000)	Crude death rate (per 1000)	Natural change (per 1000)	Total fertility rate	Female fertile population (15–49 years)
1901	7,500	283	169	114	37.9	22.6	15.3		
1902	7,600	264	168	96	34.8	22.1	12.6		
1903	7,700	273	166	107	35.4	21.5	13.9		
1904	7,800	256	175	81	32.7	22.4	10.4		
1905	7,900	248	181	67	31.2	22.8	8.4		
1906	8,100	253	131	122	31.4	16.3	15.1		
1907	8,200	231	147	84	28.3	18.0	10.3		
1908	8,300	240	145	95	29.0	17.5	11.5		
1909	8,400	226	145	81	26.9	17.3	9.6		
1910	8,500	266	152	114	31.2	17.8	13.4		
1911	8,600	239	153	86	27.7	17.7	10.0		
1912	8,700	238	141	97	27.4	16.2	11.1		
1913	8,700	243	135	108	27.9	15.5	12.4		
1914	8,700	264	150	114	30.2	17.2	13.1		
1915	8,700	213	139	74	24.4	15.9	8.5		
1916	8,800	183	141	42	20.9	16.1	4.8		
1917	8,800	200	116	84	22.8	13.2	9.6		
1918	8,800	211	200	11	24.0	22.8	1.3		
1919	8,800	220	119	101	25.0	13.5	11.5		
1920	8,800	262	141	121	29.7	16.0	13.7		
1921	8,800	253	122	131	28.6	13.8	14.8		
1922	8,900	247	131	116	27.7	14.7	13.0		
1923	9,000	222	151	71	24.6	16.7	7.9		
1924	9,100	249	109	140	27.2	11.9	15.3		
1925	9,300	200	128	72	21.6	13.8	7.8		
1926	9,400	226	112	114	24.1	11.9	12.1		
1927	9,500	215	141	74	22.6	14.8	7.8		
1928	9,600	202	111	91	21.0	11.5	9.4		
1929	9,800	206	106	100	21.1	10.9	10.2		
1930	9,900	199	104	95	20.1	10.5	9.6		
1931	10,000	207	130	77	20.7	13.0	7.7		
1932	10,100	196	106	90	19.4	10.5	8.9		
1933	10,200	240	119	121	23.5	11.7	11.9		
1934	10,300	229	102	127	22.2	9.9	12.3		
1935	10,400	226	130	96	21.7	12.5	9.2		
1936	10,500	225	121	104	21.4	11.5	9.9		
1937	10,600	226	145	81	21.3	13.7	7.6		
1938	10,700	213	136	77	19.9	12.7	7.2		
1939	10,800	255	136	119	23.6	12.6	11.0		
1940	10,900	281	119	162	25.7	10.9	14.8		
1941	11,000	249	117	132	22.6	10.6	12.0		
1942	11,200	284	141	143	25.3	12.6	12.7		
1943	11,500	301	128	173	26.2	11.1	15.1		
1944	11,700	342	120	222	29.1	10.2	18.9		
1945	12,000	324	148	176	27.0	12.3	14.7		
1946	12,300	351	139	212	28.6	11.3	17.3		
1947	12,600	314	174	140	25.0	13.9	11.2		
1948	12,900	366	135	231	28.4	10.5	17.9		
1949	13,300	311	131	180	23.5	9.9	13.6		
1950	13,600	275	105	170	20.2	7.7	12.5		
1951	13,900	290	114	176	20.9	8.2	12.7		
1952	14,100	303	132	171	21.5	9.4	12.1		
1953	14,300	317	137	180	22.2	9.6	12.6		
1954	14,500	316	127	189	21.7	8.7	13.0		
1955	14,800	300	125	175	20.3	8.5	11.9		
1956	15,000	317	133	184	21.2	8.9	12.3		
1957	15,200	351	127	224	23.1	8.4	14.7		
1958	15,600	372	142	230	23.9	9.1	14.8		
1959	16,000	345	127	218	21.5	7.9	13.6		
1960	16,500	380	123	257	23.1	7.5	15.6		
1961	16,900	359	131	228	21.3	7.8	13.5		
1962	17,400	360	166	194	20.6	9.5	11.1		
1963	18,100	398	146	252	22.0	8.1	13.9		
1964	18,800	386	148	238	20.6	7.9	12.7		
1965	19,200	395	156	239	20.6	8.1	12.5		
1966	19,600	370	152	218	18.9	7.8	11.1		
1967	20,200	411	158	253	20.4	7.8	12.5		
1968	20,800	431	148	283	20.7	7.1	13.6		
1969	21,100	420	168	252	19.9	8.0	12.0		
1970	21,100	422	163	259	20.0	7.7	12.3		
1971	21,600	350	186	164	16.2	8.6	7.6		
1972	22,100	359	149	210	16.2	6.7	9.5		
1973	22,800	403	178	225	17.7	7.8	9.9		
1974	23,500	326	147	179	13.9	6.3	7.6		
1975	23,800	306	179	127	12.8	7.5	5.3		
1976	24,100	347	178	169	14.4	7.4	7.0		
1977	24,400	309	148	161	12.6	6.1	6.6		
1978	25,000	313	163	150	12.5	6.5	6.0		
1979	25,600	370	173	197	14.5	6.8	7.7		
1980	25,500	393	175	218	15.4	6.9	8.5		
1981	25,700	369	161	208	14.4	6.3	8.1		
1982	26,300	384	167	217	14.6	6.4	8.3		
1983	26,400	348	151	197	13.2	5.7	7.4		
1984	26,600	405	177	228	15.2	6.7	8.6		
1985	26,900	373	171	202	13.9	6.4	7.5		
1986	27,200	351	188	163	12.9	6.9	6.0		
1987	27,600	365	180	185	13.2	6.5	6.7		
1988	27,900	416	195	221	14.9	7.0	7.9		
1989	28,300	373	172	201	13.2	6.1	7.1		
1990	28,700	379	195	184	13.2	6.8	6.4		
1991	29,200	416	187	229	14.2	6.4	7.8		
1992	29,600	375	180	195	12.7	6.1	6.6		
1993	30,100	415	178	237	13.8	5.9	7.9		
1994	30,500	358	206	152	11.7	6.8	5.0		
1995	30,800	425	225	200	13.8	7.3	6.5		
1996	31,000	405	230	175	13.1	7.4	5.6		
1997	31,200	435	230	205	13.9	7.4	6.6		
1998	31,700	382	208	174	12.1	6.6	5.5		
1999	32,200	430	206	224	13.3	6.4	7.0	1.63	8,744
2000	32,673	420	239	181	12.9	7.3	5.5	1.58	8,903
2001	33,104	401	220	181	12.1	6.6	5.5	1.53	8,981
2002	33,678	395	215	180	11.7	6.4	5.3	1.49	9,016
2003	34,022	347	217	130	10.2	6.4	3.8	1.36	9,022
2004	34,477	372	198	174	10.8	5.7	5.0	1.46	9,028
2005	34,734	381	215	166	11.0	6.2	4.8	1.51	9,024
2006	35,010	361	220	141	10.3	6.3	4.0	1.45	9,022
2007	35,322	351	227	124	9.9	6.4	3.5	1.44	8,994
2008	35,446	350	205	145	9.9	5.8	4.1	1.45	8,967
2009	35,789	406	229	177	11.3	6.4	4.9	1.71	8,917
2010	36,010	329	238	91	9.1	6.6	2.5	1.40	8,872
2011	36,281	395	248	147	10.9	6.8	4.1	1.69	8,867
2012	36,636	357	224	133	9.7	6.1	3.6	1.51	8,860
2013	36,942	339	246	93	9.2	6.7	2.5	1.45	8,839
2014	37,215	372	268	104	10.0	7.2	2.8	1.59	8,775
2015	37,468	325	252	73	8.7	6.7	1.9	1.40	8,724
2016	37,686	378	271	107	10.0	7.2	2.8	1.61	8,669
2017	37,877	338	249	89	8.9	6.6	2.3	1.44	8,603
2018	38,201	378	274	104	9.9	7.2	2.7	1.58	8,518
2019	38,557	356	263	93	9.2	6.8	2.4	1.47	8,446
2020	38,896	353	319	34	9.0	8.2	0.8	1.46	8,443
2021	39,151	375	271	104	9.5	6.9	2.6	1.53	8,431
2022	39,444	364	279	85	9.2	7.1	2.1	1.47	8,409
2023	39,790	361	270	91	9.1	6.8	2.3	1.45	8,368
2024	40,015	340	302	38	8.4	7.4	1.0	1.37	8,435
2025	41,024	316	317	–1	7.7	7.7	–0.0	1.28 (e)	
2026	41,227								

=== Life expectancy ===
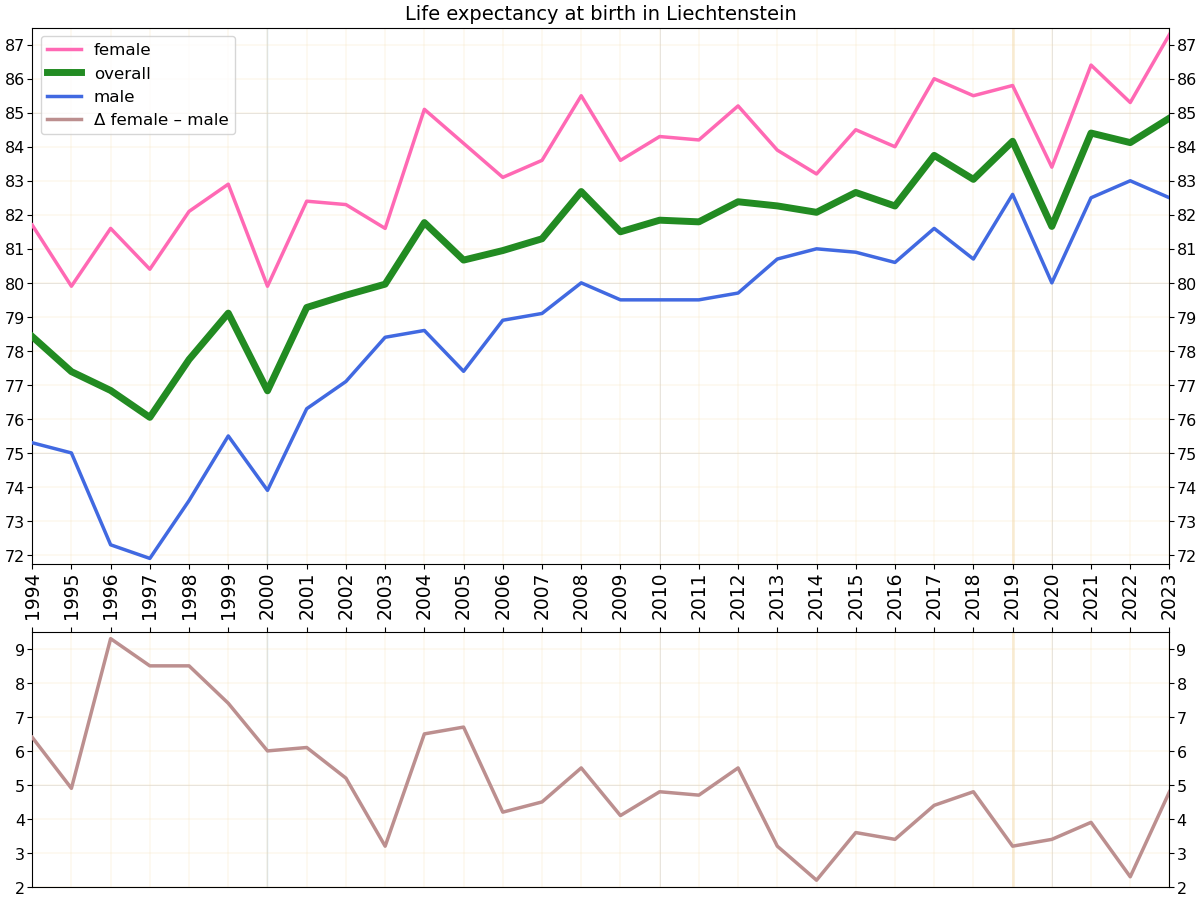
Life expectancy at birth in Liechtenstein

Nationality by year
Nationality	2017	2016
Liechtensteiners	66.2%	66.2%
Swiss	9.5%	9.5%
Austrians	5.8%	5.8%
Germans	4.2%	4.1%
Italians	3.1%	3.2%
Portuguese	1.9%	1.9%
Turks	1.6%	1.8%
Kosovar Albanians	1.1%	1.1%
Spaniards	1.0%	0.9%
Others	5.6%	5.5%

Language in Liechtenstein
Main language	2010	%	2020	
Main language	Number	%	Number	%
German	34,171	94.53%	36,088	92.4%
Italian	412	1.14%	494	1.26%
Portuguese	284	0.79%	390	1%
Turkish	227	0.63%	362	0.93%
Spanish	268	0.74%	324	0.83%
Serbo-Croatian	244	0.67%	288	0.74%
Albanian	143	0.4%	207	0.53%
English	59	0.16%	199	0.51%
Russian	33	0.09%	84	0.22%
French	39	0.11%	79	0.2%
Other languages	269	0.74%	540	1.38%

== Religion ==
In 2020, 88.76% of the population had a Christian background, 6% were Muslim and 5% had no religious beliefs.

Religion	2015	2010	2000	1990
Catholics	73.4%	75.9%	78.4%	84.9%
Protestants	8.2%	8.5%	8.3%	9.2%
Christian-Orthodox Churches	1.3%	1.1%	1.1%	0.7%
Other Christian Churches	0.3%	0.3%	0.1%	0.2%
Muslims	5.9%	5.4%	4.8%	2.4%
Other religions	0.8%	0.8%	0.3%	0.2%
No religion	7.0%	5.4%	2.8%	1.5%
Undeclared	3.3%	2.6%	4.1%	0.9%

== See also ==
- Languages of Liechtenstein
- Turks in Liechtenstein
