= Harun Alpsoy =

Turkish footballer (born 1997)

Personal information
- Full name: Harun Alpsoy
- Date of birth: 3 March 1997 (age 29)
- Place of birth: Menziken, Switzerland
- Height: 1.85 m (6 ft 1 in)
- Position: Midfielder

Team information
- Current team: Serikspor

Youth career
- 2005–2006: FC Menzo Reinach
- 2006–2012: FC Luzern
- 2012–2015: Grasshopper

Senior career*
Years	Team	Apps	(Gls)
2015–2016	Grasshopper II	20	(3)
2015–2017	Grasshopper	15	(0)
2017–2022	Antalyaspor	33	(2)
2020–2021	→ Altay (loan)	9	(0)
2022–2023	Bodrumspor	0	(0)
2023	Schaffhausen	16	(0)
2023–2025	Adanaspor	58	(0)
2025–2026	Boluspor	14	(1)
2026–	Serikspor	0	(0)

International career^{‡}
2012	Switzerland U15	3	(0)
2013	Switzerland U16	2	(0)
2013–2014	Switzerland U17	9	(1)
2015	Switzerland U18	1	(0)
2015–2016	Switzerland U19	11	(3)
2018	Turkey U20	4	(0)
- * Club domestic league appearances and goals as of 6 May 2026 ‡ National team caps and goals as of 9 June 2018

Harun Alpsoy (born 3 March 1997) is a professional footballer who plays for Turkish TFF 2. Lig club Serikspor. Born in Switzerland, he represented it internationally, before switching allegiance to Turkey.

== International career ==
Alpsoy was born in Switzerland and is of Turkish descent. Originally a youth international for Switzerland, Alpsoy switched to represent Turkey. He made his international debut for the Turkey U20s in a 2-1 2018 Toulon Tournament win over the Japan U20s on 28 May 2018.
