= Gemma Salem =

Swiss writer (1943–2020)

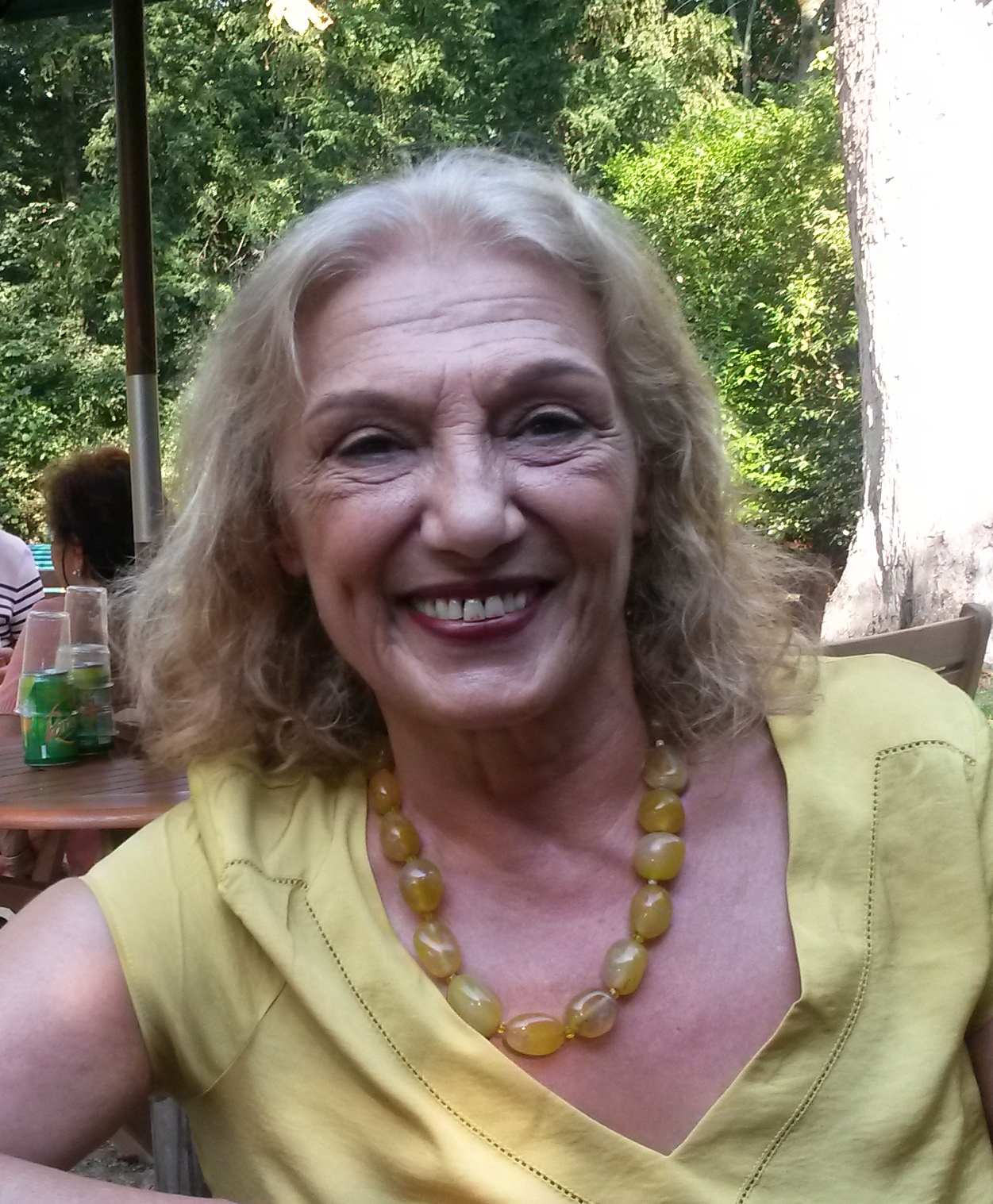
- Salem in 2015
- Born: 2 August 1943; Antakya, Turkey
- Died: 20 May 2020 (aged 76); Vienna, Austria
- Occupation: Writer

Gemma Salem (2 August 1943 – 20 May 2020) was a Swiss writer.

== Biography ==
Salem spent her youth in the Middle East and attended various Catholic schools in Istanbul, Tehran, and Beirut. When she arrived in Europe in the early 1960s, she worked as a dancer, secretary, and actress. She moved to Switzerland, where she married Rémy Dubugnon in December 1967 and acquired Swiss nationality by marriage. Dubugnon died in 1975, and Salem moved to France four years thereafter, alongside her new companion René Bottlang.

In 1982, Salem was nominated for the Prix Médicis for her novel Le Roman de Monsieur Boulgakov, and was supported by Marthe Robert until the last round of voting. She won the Schiller Prize in 1992 and was on the list of winners for the Prix Médicis essai and the Prix Colette in 1993. She moved to Vienna in 1990 and lived there until her death on 20 May 2020 at the age of 76.

Her archives are managed by the literature center at the University of Lausanne.

== Works ==
=== Novels and Essays ===
- Le Roman de Monsieur Boulgakov (1982)
- La Passion de Giulia (1984)
- Les Exilés de Khorramshahr (1986)
- Bétulia (1987)
- Lettre à l'hermite autrichien (1989)
- L'Artiste (1991)
- Thomas Bernhard et les siens (1993)
- Schubert (1994)
- Mes amis et autres ennemis (1995)
- L'Opale de Saint-Antoine (2001)
- La Rumba à Beethoven (2014)
- Dramuscules viennois | Wiener Dramolette (2014)
- Où sont ceux que ton cœur aime (2019)
- Larry, une amitié avec Lawrence Durrell (2019)

=== Theatre ===
- Quelques jours dans la vie de Monsieur Boulgakov (1989)
- Ludwig et Lola (1996)
- Aloïs-le-voyou (1996)
- Les Dramuscules viennois (1998)
- Le Bon Misanthrope (2008)
- W comme Cassiopée (2016)
