= Fedayi San =

Swiss football referee (born 1982)

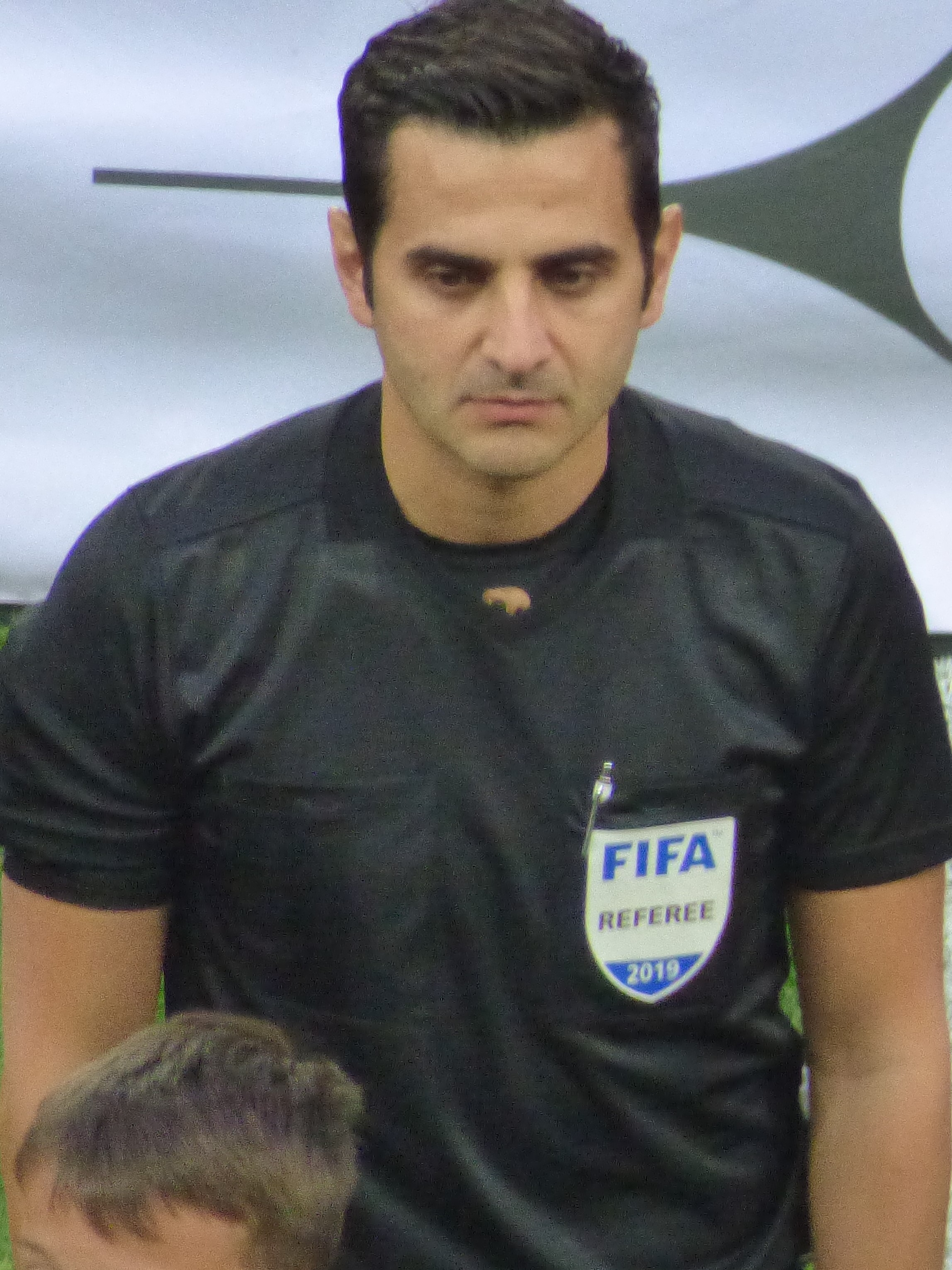
- San in 2019
- Born: 11 November 1982 (age 43); Brugg, Switzerland

Domestic
Years	League	Role
2013–present	Swiss Super League	Referee

International
Years	League	Role
2015–present	FIFA listed	Video assistant referee

Fedayi San (born 11 November 1982) is a Swiss football referee who has been listed on the FIFA International Referees List since 2015.

== Career ==
Fedayi San was born in Brugg, Switzerland, to Turkish parents. He began his refereeing career at the age of 19 by officiating at a local league in Windisch. San quickly ascended through the leagues in Switzerland, taking part in the Swiss Challenge League in 2010 and reaching the Swiss Super League in 2013. Among his accomplishments at his country's tournaments, San oversaw the final game of the 2018–19 Swiss Cup between FC Basel and FC Thun at the Stade de Suisse in Bern.

After earning his FIFA badge in 2015, San has been appointed to matches at the UEFA Champions League and the UEFA Nations League. San soon specialized as a video assistant referee (VAR) and also refereed in foreign leagues under an agreement made by the Swiss Football Association and the ruling bodies of other countries. He has been an active assistant of Swiss pitch referee Sandro Schärer.

As a VAR official, San was selected for the 2023 FIFA U-17 World Cup and the 2023 FIFA U-20 World Cup in Indonesia and Argentina, respectively. In 2024, he was appointed as VAR to the UEFA Euro 2024 in Germany and was an assistant VAR official at the 2024 UEFA Super Cup between Real Madrid and Atalanta in Warsaw.

In April 2026, San was appointed as VAR to the 2026 FIFA World Cup in North America.

== Personal life ==
San is married and has three children. He stated in an interview in March 2025 that he does not have social media because of the poor interactions he had due to being a referee.
