= Rosa Schupbach =

American economist, philanthropist

- Schupbach in 2017
- Born: Rosa Lechner; June 19, 1928; Zürich, Switzerland
- Died: January 11, 2022 (aged 93); New York City, U.S.
- Education: Columbia University (MA); Columbia University (MA)
- Occupations: Economist and auxiliary police officer
- Spouses: Mehdi Tajbakhsh (m. 1952; div. 1959) Edmund W. Schupbach (m. 1962; died 1973)

Rosa Lechner Schupbach (née Lechner; formerly Tajbakhsh; June 29, 1928 – January 11, 2022) was an American economist, philanthropist and former auxiliary police officer of the New York City Police Department. She was primarily known for her work associated with the National Bureau of Economic Research between 1983 and 1990.

== Early life and education ==
Rosa Lechner was born June 29, 1928, in Zürich, Switzerland, the second child of Florian Lechner (1886–1955), a butcher turned businessman, and Marie Lechner (née Ozeler; 1893–1993). She had a brother, Hans Lechner (born June 24, 1919), who was nine-year her senior.

Her father, Florian Lechner, was born in Vienna, Austria, and had trained as a butcher. Her mother was a maid hailing from the Black Forest in Germany. In 1918, they would open their own modest restaurant, and a few years later expand with buying a neighboring butchery. In 1924, they became Swiss citizens. In 1936, Florian decided to retire and enjoy life more with his family, this was possible through the wealth he accumulated through several income streams.

She was raised living in Zurich, Lucerne, Castagnola and Lugano – where she would always attend German-speaking schools. She spent grades 7 and 8 in a finishing school in Vevey, which was led by Protestant deaconesses. Between 1945 and 1948, Lechner attended Handels-Töchternschule, a commercial school for female students in Zürich. While in the United States, she later earned two Master of Arts from Columbia University.

== Career ==
In 1948 Lechner started her career at Swiss Bank Corporation (presently UBS) in Zürich, but shortly after she transferred to the London branch in London. Between 1952 and 1958, she continued to work there part and full-time in a variety of roles. In 1959, after her emigration, she initially took a secretary position at a used office machine store in Manhattan. This position was conveyed by the Swiss consulate in New York City, which back then offered services like that to emigrants. From 1961 to 1967 she held a position as economist at the Caltex Petroleum Corporation and subsequently became a legal assistant at Anderson, Russell Kill & Olick from 1971 to 1977. Schupbach then engaged as a research assistant to professor Fritz Machlup in the Department of Economics at New York University. Her last position was at the National Bureau of Economic Research which she held until her retirement in 1990.

== Personal life ==
During her time in London she met Mehdi Tajbakhsh, originally from Iran, who studied agronomy. After a few years of courtship, they decided to go to her native, where he would continue his studies at the Agricultural School Strickhof in Zürich. Ultimately, they were married at Zurich Town Hall, in a small civilian ceremony, in 1952. Her father declined to attend the ceremony and disapproved in her choice to marry a foreigner from the Middle East.

Due to her marriage she faced several discrimination as a woman married to a foreigner. Ultimately, she had to relinquish her Swiss citizenship, and in return received Iranian citizenship and permanent residency status. They were divorced in 1955, as he wanted to return to Iran, which was out of the question for her. She was then able to reclaim her Swiss citizenship for an administrative fee of 10 Swiss Francs. On November 12, 1959, she emigrated to the United States, with a quota immigration visa and $2,000. Since 1966, Schupbach held Swiss-American dual citizenship.

In 1967 she fell for her coworker, Edmund "Ed" Schupbach (1927–1973), an accountant at Caltex, and they continued to go out together. They were married during the semester break of 1967 on the campus of Columbia University. Despite his name he did not have Swiss roots, his ancestors emigrated from Nanzenbach in Prussia in the 19th century.

Both her marriages remained without issue. In her later life, Schupbach was a frequent traveler, who was eager to held on to her frequent traveler status. Schupbach died on January 11, 2022, aged 93 in her Upper East Side apartment in New York City.

== Literature ==
- Westwärts Begegnungen mit Amerika-Schweizerinnen, Susanne Bosshard-Kälin, 2009 (in German)
