= Dany Bahar =

Swiss CEO

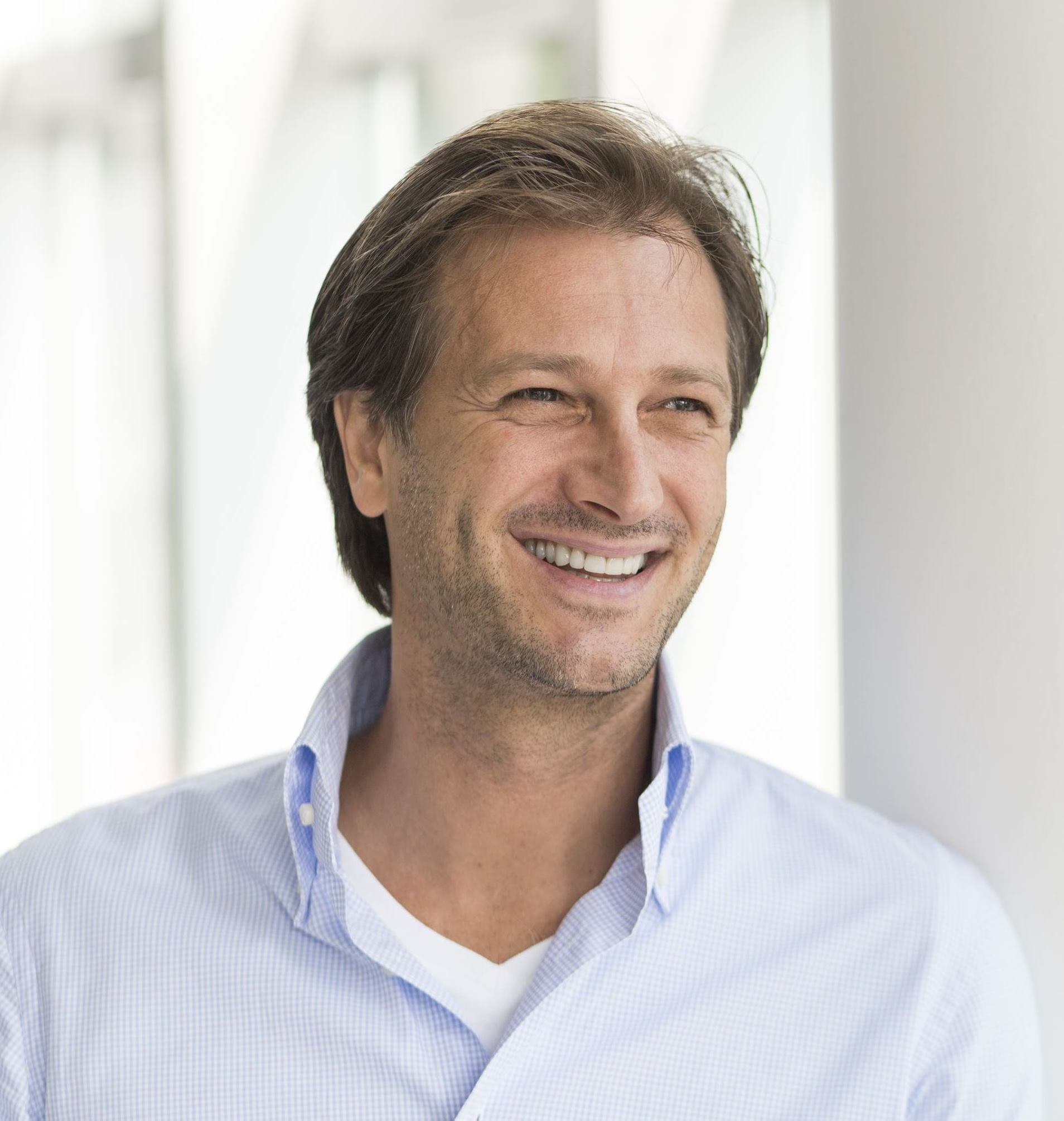
- Born: Dany Taner Bahar; 17 December 1971 (age 54); Istanbul, Turkey
- Occupations: Founder and CEO of ARES

Dany Taner Bahar (born 17 December 1971) is a Turkish-born Swiss business executive and the founder of luxury automotive retailer ARES. His involvement in the automotive and motorsports industries began at Red Bull, where between 2003 and 2007 he led the launch of the Formula One teams Red Bull Racing and Scuderia Toro Rosso. From 2007 to 2009 he was Senior Vice President Commercial and Brand at Ferrari, after which he became CEO of Group Lotus, a term which ended in 2012 after the parent company was taken over. In 2012 he founded ARES, an Italian company modifying high-performance cars.

== Early life and education ==
Dany Bahar was born in Istanbul, Turkey, on 17 December 1971 and grew up in the Swiss ski village of Silvaplana, near the Italian border. He studied marketing at the Kaufmännische Handelsschule (commercial school) in Wil, Switzerland.

== Career ==
=== Early career ===
Dany Bahar began his career as a sports marketer for Coni Altherr, a Swiss inline skating company and the founder of the Swiss Inline Cup. He later moved to Rome where he worked for Sabatino Aracu, president of the International Roller Sports Federation. In 2001, after a time in Dubai as a project coordinator for an IT firm, he worked for two years as an asset manager for Fritz Kaiser, a wealth management entrepreneur based in Vaduz, Liechtenstein.

=== Red Bull ===
While working for Fritz Kaiser, Dany Bahar met Dietrich Mateschitz, Red Bull's Austrian co-founder and a partner of Kaiser. He subsequently worked with Dietrich Mateschitz at Red Bull, responsible for its entry into Formula One with the launch of Red Bull Racing and Scuderia Toro Rosso, as well as into US-based NASCAR. Alongside auto racing, Dany Bahar also oversaw Red Bull's purchase of football clubs in Salzburg, New York City and Ghana in a series of acquisitions that saw the New York MetroStars rebranded as the New York Red Bulls. He was Red Bull's chief operating officer from 2003 to 2007.

=== Ferrari ===
During negotiations to supply Ferrari engines to Red Bull Racing in 2006, Dany Bahar came into contact with his counterparts at Ferrari. In 2007 he was hired with the title Senior Vice President, Commercial and Brand, heading the manufacturer's new global brand department. In this role he implemented a licensing and merchandising campaign and expanded the number of Ferrari retail stores.

=== Lotus ===
At the 2009 Geneva Motor Show he was approached by Malaysian car maker Proton – owner of British manufacturer Lotus, which had been operating at a loss for 15 years. He became CEO of Group Lotus in October that year and launched a five-year plan intended to target emerging markets like China. At the 2010 Paris Motor Show, Lotus unveiled five new cars in a bid to move away from its low-margin model and move upmarket to rival Ferrari, Aston Martin and Porsche. Later that year Lotus returned to Formula One with the relaunch of the Renault F1 Team as Lotus Renault GP. In 2011 Lotus opened its first showroom in Beijing, offering four coupes.

Following an internal investigation, amid allegations that he was misusing company funds for extravagant expenses, Bahar was dismissed from his role as CEO in June 2012. That August, he sued DRB-HICOM and Lotus for £6.7m, alleging Lotus dismissed him to avoid paying five percent of the company's value he was owed as a result of the recent acquisition of the company by DRB. Lotus later sued Bahar for £2.5m in an effort it said was to recoup some of the money he had spent. An out-of-court settlement was reached in May 2014.

=== ARES ===
In 2014 Dany Bahar founded ARES – a Modena-based automotive atelier specialising in bodykits, interior upgrades and performance and power improvements.

== Personal life ==
Dany Bahar lives in Dubai and is married with three children.
