= Hasan Candan =

Swiss politician (born 1985)

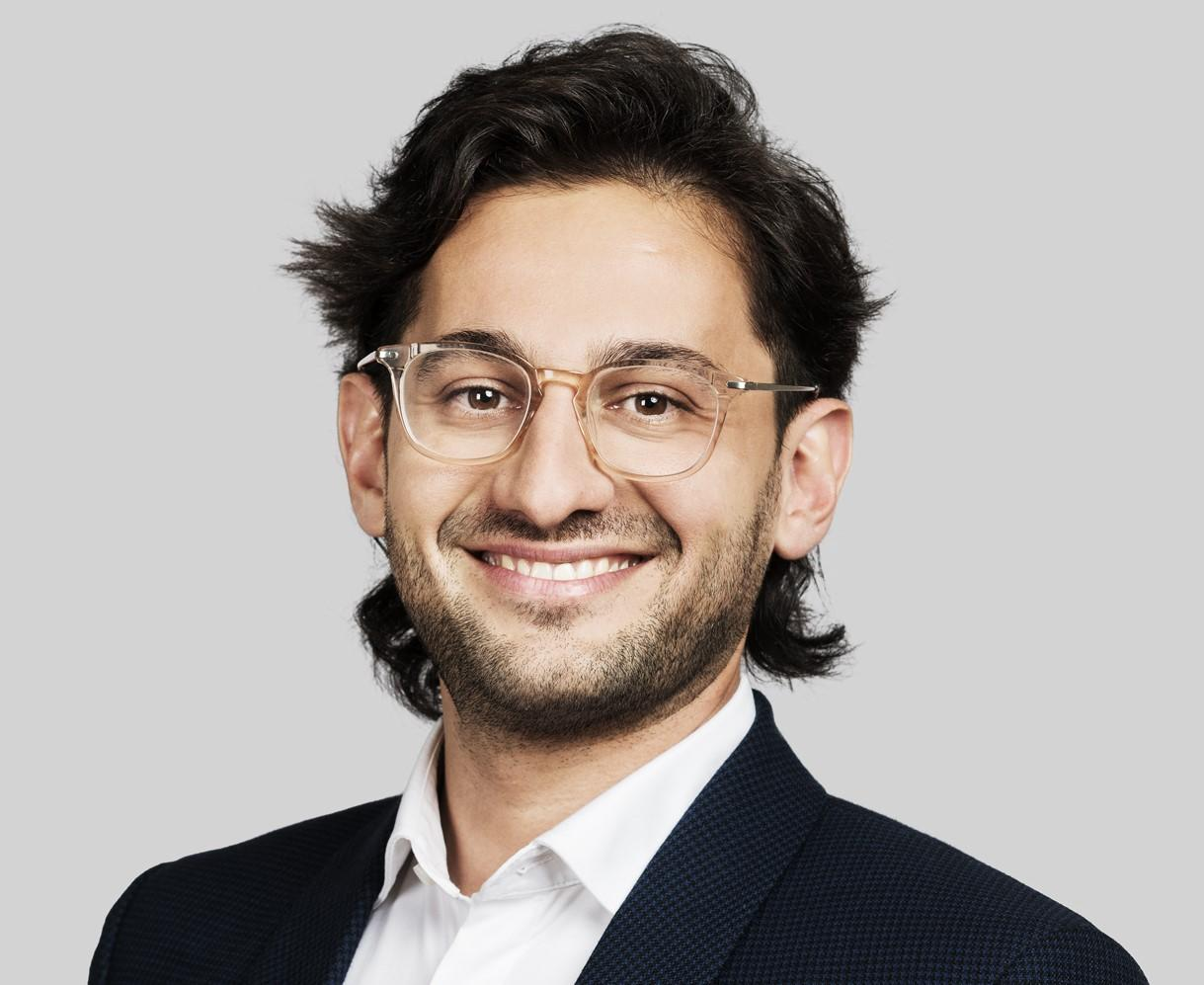
- Official portrait, 2023

Member of the National Council of Switzerland
- Incumbent
- Assumed office 4 December 2023
- Constituency: Canton of Lucerne

Member of the Cantonal Council of Lucerne
- In office 20 June 2011 – 31 October 2023
- Succeeded by: Angela Pfäffli

Personal details
- Born: Hasan Candan; 24 February 1985 (age 41) Lucerne, Switzerland
- Citizenship: Switzerland; Turkey
- Party: Social Democratic Party
- Children: 1
- Education: University of Bern
- Website: Official website Parliament website

Hasan Candan (Turkish pronunciation: [haˈsan ˈdʒandan]; born 24 February 1985) is a Swiss politician who currently serves as member of the National Council for the Social Democratic Party after being elected during the 2023 Swiss federal election. He assumed office on 4 December 2023. He served on the Cantonal Council of Lucerne between 2011 and 2023.

== Life ==
Candan was born 24 February 1985 in Lucerne, Switzerland, the son of Turkish immigrant parents. His father, Enver Candan, a social worker and jurist, arrived in Switzerland in 1982 after fleeing political persecution. He was a Socialist member of the Lucerne city council from 2014 to 2019. His wife died early and therefore he was a single father.

Between 2005 and 2011 he studied sports science and business administration at the University of Bern. Since 20 June 2011 he serves as a member of the Cantonal Council of Lucerne. He is single and has one child.
