= Cengiz Biçer =

Liechtenstein footballer (born 1987)

Personal information
- Full name: Cengiz Biçer
- Date of birth: 11 December 1987 (age 38)
- Place of birth: Grabs, Switzerland
- Height: 1.88 m (6 ft 2 in)
- Position: Goalkeeper

Team information
- Current team: Eschen/Mauren

Youth career
- 1997–2001: Eschen/Mauren

Senior career*
Years	Team	Apps	(Gls)
2007–2008	Eschen/Mauren	0	(0)
2008–2010	Samsunspor	1	(0)
2010–2014	Mersin İdmanyurdu	3	(0)
2014–2016	Göztepe	1	(0)
2016–2017	Yomraspor	0	(0)
2017–2018	Kastamonuspor	3	(0)
2018–2022	Gümüşhanespor	76	(0)
2022–2023	Balzers	19	(0)
2023–2025	Eschen/Mauren	2	(0)

International career^{‡}
2007–2008	Liechtenstein U21	6	(0)
2009–2015	Liechtenstein	11	(0)
- * Club domestic league appearances and goals as of 31 May 2025 ‡ National team caps and goals as of 19 June 2015

Cengiz Biçer (born 11 December 1987) is a Liechtensteiner former footballer who played as a goalkeeper.

== Career ==
After a year with USV Eschen/Mauren, where he had played in his youth, Biçer moved to the Turkish side Samsunspor. In 2010, Biçer moved onto Mersin İdmanyurdu on a transfer. His debut in the Turkish Top Division was 30 March 2012 in the game versus Karabükspor.

== International career ==
He is a member of the Liechtenstein national football team, but only has been capped 11 times as he remains behind long-time number one goalkeeper Peter Jehle. Biçer was capped six times for the Liechtenstein national under-21 football team in 2007 and 2008.
