= Seyhan Yildiz =

Liechtenstein footballer (born 1989)

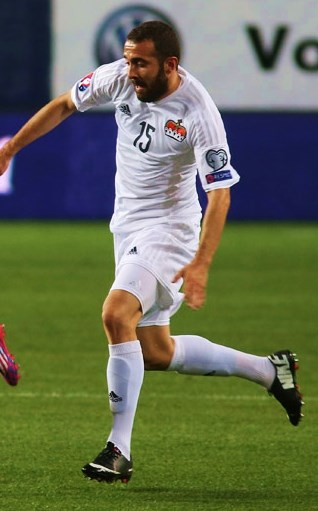

Personal information
- Full name: Seyhan Yildiz
- Date of birth: 30 April 1989 (age 37)
- Place of birth: Grabs, Switzerland
- Height: 1.77 m (5 ft 9 1/2 in)
- Position: Fullback

Team information
- Current team: FC Ruggell

Senior career*
Years	Team	Apps	(Gls)
2007–2008	FC Altstätten	2	(0)
2008–2010	SC Austria Lustenau II	10	(0)
2010–2011	FC Widnau	4	(0)
2011–2013	FC Schaan	8	(1)
2013–2022	FC Balzers	177	(6)
2022–2024	USV Eschen/Mauren	16	(0)
2024–	FC Ruggell	0	(0)

International career^{‡}
2008–2010	Liechtenstein U21	11	(0)
2013–2023	Liechtenstein	63	(1)
- * Club domestic league appearances and goals as of 31 May 2025 ‡ National team caps and goals as of 17 June 2023

Seyhan Yildiz (born 30 April 1989) is a footballer who plays for FC Ruggell in Liechtenstein. Born in Switzerland, he represented the Liechtenstein national team.

== International career ==
He was a member of the Liechtenstein national football team and holds 63 caps, making his debut in a friendly against Azerbaijan on 6 February 2013.

=== International goals ===
Scores and results list Liechtenstein's goal tally first.

#	Date	Venue	Opponent	Score	Result	Competition
1.	13 October 2018	Philip II Arena, Skopje, Macedonia	North Macedonia	1–3	1–4	2018–19 UEFA Nations League D
