= Burak Eris =

Liechtensteiner footballer (born 1989)

Personal information
- Full name: Burak Eris
- Date of birth: 17 July 1989 (age 37)
- Place of birth: Grabs, Switzerland
- Height: 1.70 m (5 ft 7 in)
- Position: Midfielder

Senior career*
Years	Team	Apps	(Gls)
2007–2008	FC Schaan		
2008–2010	FC Buchs		
2010–2013	FC Schaan		
2013	FC Balzers	6	(0)
2014	FC Chur 97	9	(0)
2014–2015	Eschen/Mauren	17	(0)
2015–2016	FC Schaan		
2016–2019	FC St. Margrethen		
2019	FC Buchs		
2019–2021	FC St. Margrethen		
2021–2025	FC Buchs		

International career
2009–2010	Liechtenstein U21	9	(0)
2013	Liechtenstein	2	(0)
- * Club domestic league appearances and goals as of 6 June 2026

Burak Eris (born 17 July 1989) is a retired Liechtensteiner footballer who last played for FC Buchs in Switzerland. Born in Switzerland, he represented Liechtenstein internationally.

== International career ==
He was a member of the Liechtenstein national football team and holds two caps, making his debut in a friendly against Azerbaijan on 6 February 2013.
