= Gülsha Adilji =

Swiss journalist and television presenter

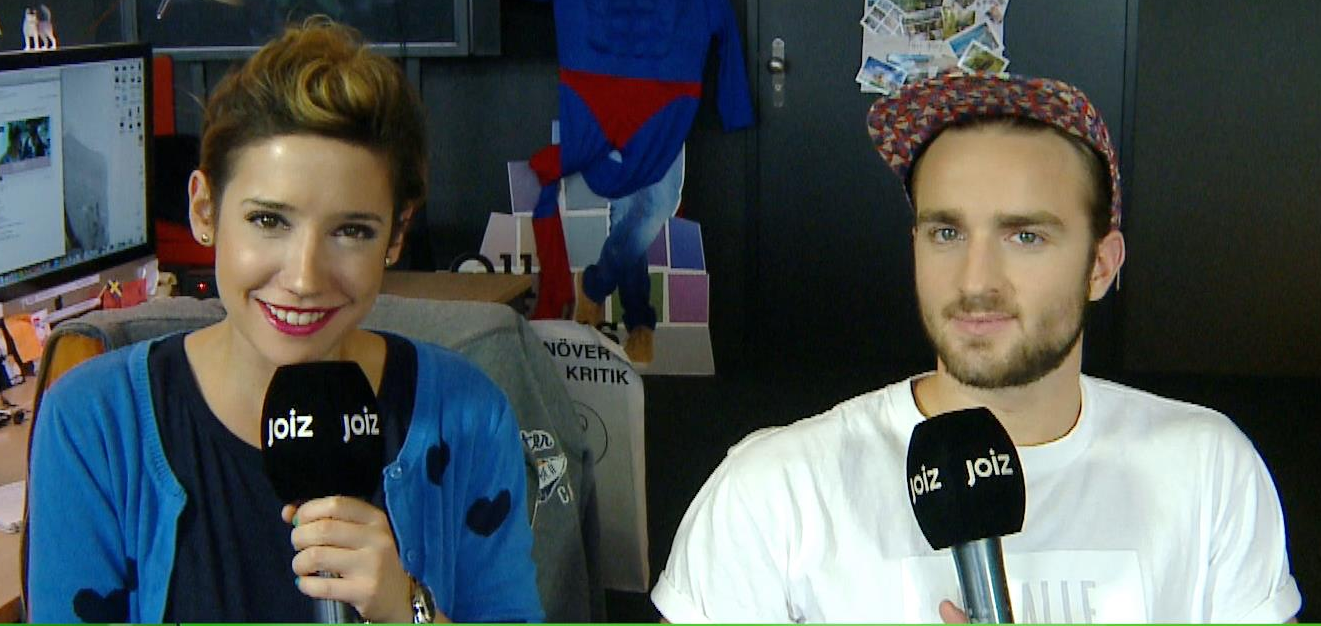
- Born: 18 October 1985; Uzwil, Switzerland
- Occupations: Journalist, television presenter

Gülsha Adilji is a Swiss journalist and television presenter.

== Career ==
Adilji applied to the youth television broadcaster Joiz as a web editor by email and was hired as a moderator. At Joiz she moderated the programs Gülsha follows you, NOIZ, EVEEEEER !, Germany for beginners, Balkan charts and a few more. In 2012, Gülsha Adilji was voted newcomer of the year by the Swiss journalist.

On January 13, 2017 she was a guest on the show Arena. There she was in charge of social media with the YouTuber Bendrit Bajra and thus included the young audience in the discussion.

Today she works as a moderator, social media expert, columnist and author.

== Personal life ==
Adilji's mother is of Turkish origin from Pristina and her father of Albanian origin. After completing her apprenticeship as a pharmaceutical assistant, she did her Matura and studied a semester in Popular Culture and Film Studies in Zurich. In 2010 she started studying biotechnology at the ZHAW in Wädenswil. She finally gave up her studies in favor of employment with Joiz.

Since the end of Joiz, Gülsha Adilji has been working as an author, moderator and small artist and is part of the Atelieer authoring workshop. In 2017-2019 she successfully showed her first cabaret program "D 'Gülsha Adilji shows her Schnägg" on Swiss stages.
