= Murat Kunt =

Swiss scientist of Turkish origin (born 1945)

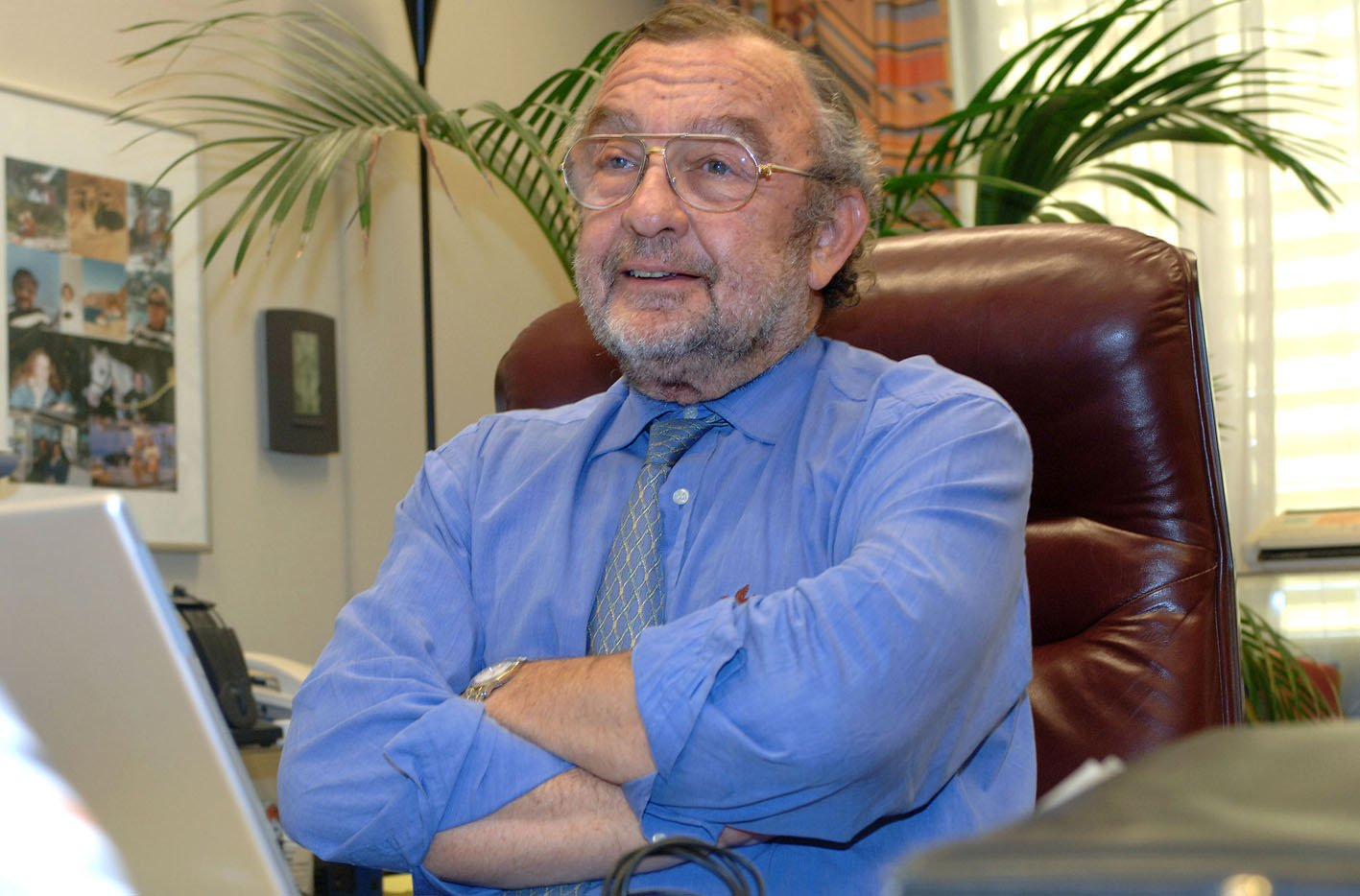
- Born: 16 January 1945 (age 81); Ankara
- Occupation: university professor
- Website: https://www.epfl.ch/labs/lts5/kunt/

Murat Kunt (born 16 January 1945) is a Swiss scientist of Turkish origin. He is known for his research and teaching in the general area of digital signal processing and image and video processing in particular. He is the author of more than 240 publications, 15 books and 16 patents. He played a pioneering role in digital image and video compression. Among the 75 doctoral students he supervised, 20 are now university professors.

== Career ==
He graduated in 1963 from Galatasaray High School in Istanbul. He then moved to Switzerland and studied at the Swiss Federal Institute of Technology (EPFL) in Lausanne and obtained his MS degree in high-energy physics in 1968. He earned his PhD studying facsimile image compression at the same institute. In 1974 he moved to the United States and worked as a research associate at the Massachusetts Institute of Technology (MIT). He returned to Lausanne at EPFL where he became a professor in 1980 and directed the Signal Processing Laboratory (one of the largest laboratories) of EPFL from 1989 to his retirement in 2008.

He lectured at several universities in Europe and in the world, in particular at MIT, at the University of Southern California (USC) and at University of California at Berkeley (sabbatical). His first book Traitement numérique des signaux (1980) is one of the reference books of the area and has been translated into several languages including English.

In 1978 Kunt created the first scientific journal on signal processing – entitled Signal Processing - and worked as its editor-in-chief till 2006. In parallel with the journal, he founded the European Association for Signal Processing (EURASIP). In 2006 he created the new journal Signal, Image and Video Processing as its editor-in-chief till 2013.

He served as a chairman and/or a member of the scientific committees of several international conferences and on the editorial boards of the Proceedings of the IEEE, Pattern Recognition Letters and Signal Processing. He was the co-chairman of the first European Signal Processing Conference (EUSIPCO) held in Lausanne in 1980 and the general chairman of the International Conference on Image Processing (ICIP'96) held in Lausanne in 1996. He was the president of the Swiss Association for Pattern Recognition from its creation until 1997. He consults for governmental offices including the French General Assembly.

In 1986 he became a fellow of the Institute of Electrical and Electronics Engineers (IEEE) for contribution to research and educational programs for signal and image processing in Europe. This was followed by the gold medal of EURASIP for meritorious services in 1983, the IEEE ASSP technical achievement award in 1996, the IEEE Third millennium Medal in 2000, an honorary doctorate from the Catholic University of Leuven in 2001, the technical achievement award of EURASIP and the imaging scientist of the year award of the IS&T and SPIE in 2003.

Several spin-offs came out of his laboratory including Alpvision, Fastcom Technologies, Visiowave, Pixartis and SpinetiX.

In addition to his scientific activities, he regularly publishes his opinions in daily newspapers and weekly journals.
