= Incidents during the July 2020 Armenian–Azerbaijani clashes =

The following is a list of civilian incidents (Note: E.g. protests, riots, brawls, and so on.) that occurred during the 2020 Armenian–Azerbaijani clashes.

== Major incidents ==
Food City boycott

On 16 July, Azerbaijanis working at Food City, Moscow's largest fruit and vegetable market owned by Azerbaijan-born God Nisanov, boycotted perishable berries sold by Armenians such as apricots and cherries. The boycott subsequently grew from being purely economical to involving forcible dispersement of Armenian merchant trucks, disallowing people with Armenian license plates to make purchases in the market, and, according to the Armenian media outlets, even allegedly extending to threats against fellow Azerbaijani merchants and their families if they continued trading with Armenians, many of whom were unwilling or unable to join the boycott. As a result, goods loaded in large trucks turned into waste, and around 65 trucks owned by Armenians were forcibly removed from the market. On 17 July, a video surfaced of Azeris in Food City stomping on apricots in a symbolic protest act against the renowned fruit of Armenia. However, Uzbek merchants of the same market later revealed that the stomped apricots were actually from Turkey.

Armenian–Azerbaijani fighting in Los Angeles

On 21 July in Los Angeles, a violent clash between Armenian protesters and Azerbaijani counter-protesters erupted in front of the Azerbaijani consulate, resulting in the injury an officer. LAPD said one person was arrested on suspicion of assault on a police officer. The demonstration was organized by ANCAWR. Demonstration organizer Alex Galitsky told that he was not aware of any injuries, but said there had been "small scuffles breaking out." Nasimi Aghayev, Consul General of Azerbaijan in Los Angeles reported that "seven people were injured and five were hospitalized as a result of attacks by Armenian protesters". Galitsky says the violence began when “an Azerbaijani protester assaulted a female Armenian protester, knocking her out with a flag pole while she was in her car.” In his letter to Azerbaijani Consulate, Mayor of Los-Angeles Eric Garcetti condemned the "action of those who resorted for violence" and promised the City “will continue to work to ensure" the safety of Azerbaijani-American community. However, Garrcetti also tweeted in support of Los Angeles' Armenian community, calling Azerbaijan's threats against Armenia "provocative and dangerous." According to LAPD, demonstrators "were protesting acts of aggression toward Armenia by Azerbaijan, when a counter-protest began and an altercation occurred". Three people were injured. Police are investigating the incident as a hate crime.

Armenian–Azerbaijani clashes in Brussels

On July 22, Armenian and Azerbaijani demonstrators clashed in front of the Azerbaijani embassy. On July 23 a demonstration was held in front of the Azerbaijani embassy in Brussels in protest at the recent attack on Armenia. Counter-demonstrators gathered inside the Embassy compound and threw various objects at the Armenian demonstrators, some of whom also threw objects back at them. According to Azerbaijani sources, this led the correspondent of the European Bureau of Azerbaijan-based REAL TV Khatira Sardargizi to be injured.

Armenian–Azerbaijani rampages in Moscow

On 24–25 July, Azerbaijanis and Armenians engaged in fights and violent rampages in Moscow. "360" TV channel reported that Azerbaijanis stopped cars with Armenian vehicle registration plates and beat people in them. Then, a group of unidentified people smashed the windows of a café of Azerbaijani cuisine on Mosfilmovskaya Street, with an additional brawl being organized by 15 Armenians in an Azerbaijani-owned restaurant called "1001 Nights". On 25 July, the local police detained more than 30 people in Moscow for fighting on inter ethnic grounds. Same day, the Kuzminsky District Court of Moscow chose "measure of restraint in the form of taking into custody against P. B. Hamidov and B. R. Valiev for 2 months". On 25 July, law enforcement officers in Saint Petersburg detained more than 60 Armenians and Azerbaijanis as "part of a preventive raid".

== Minor incidents ==
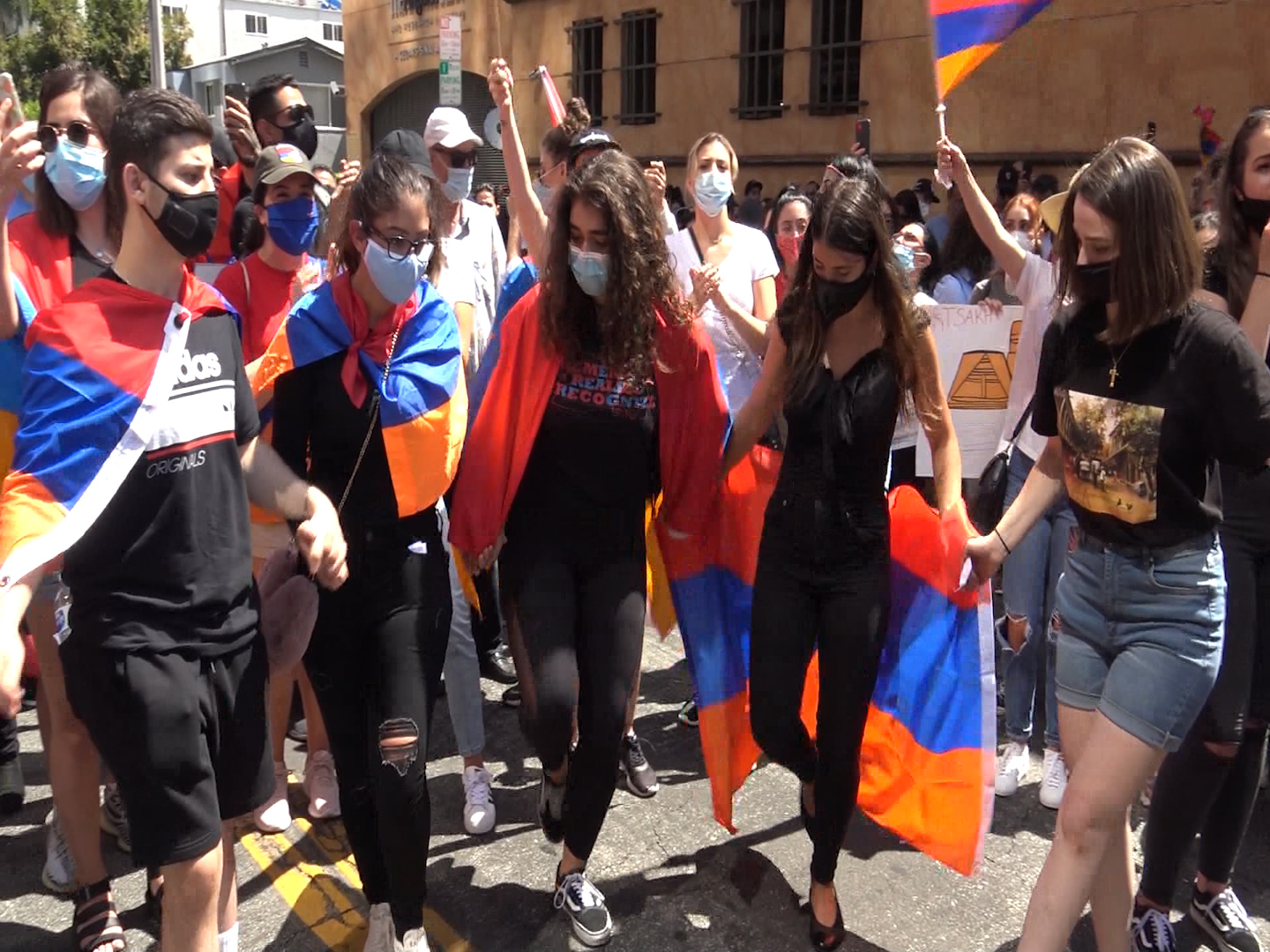
Pro-Armenian protest in Los Angeles.

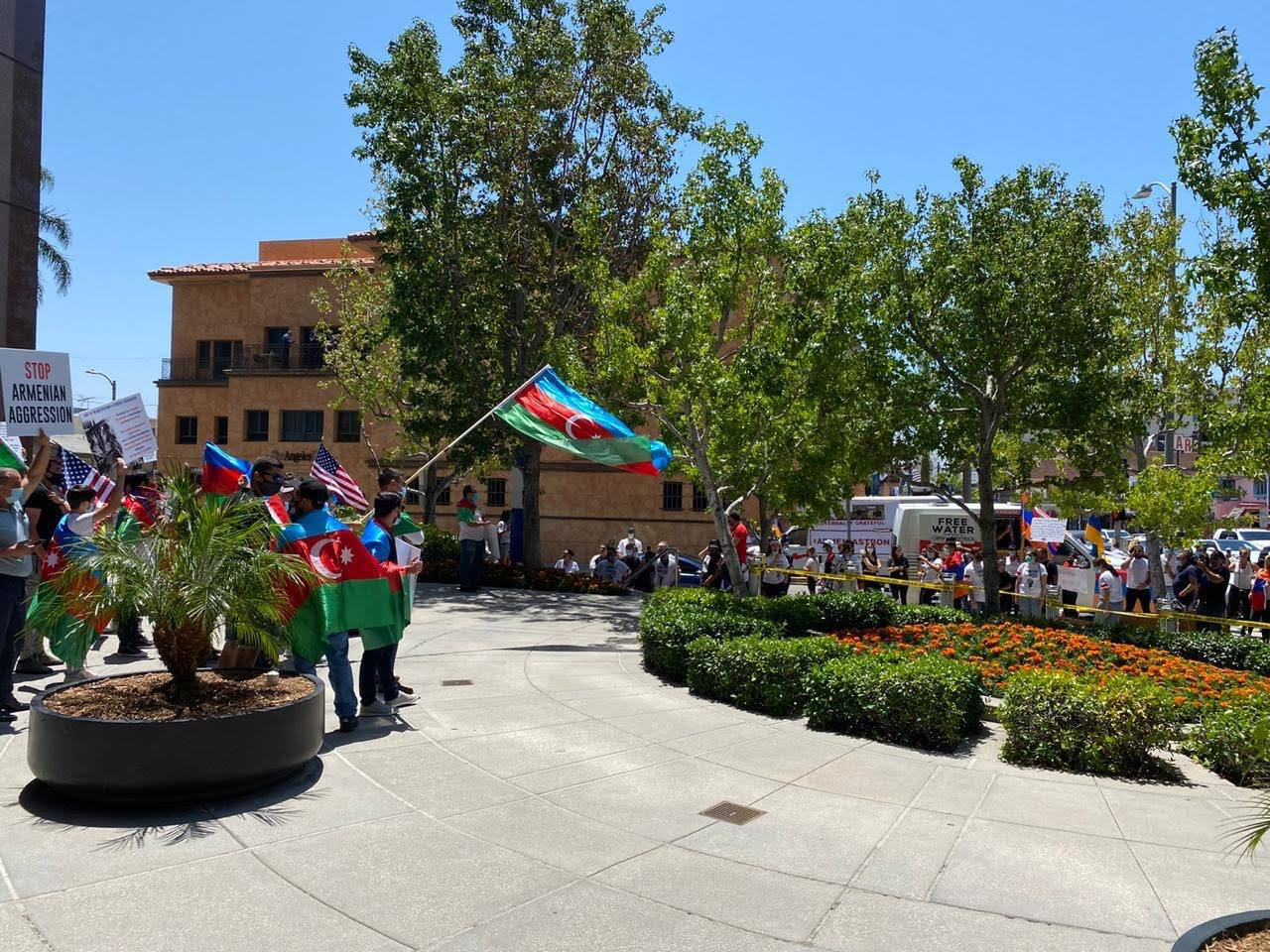
Azerbaijani and Armenian demonstrators in front of the Consulate General of Azerbaijan in Los Angeles on 21 July.

- Austria – On 18 July, demonstrators, who were holding the Azerbaijani and Turkish flags, as well as posters that read "Justice for Azerbaijan", "Armenia must fulfill the decisions of the United Nations", and "Armenia should leave the lands it occupies in Azerbaijan", gathered and held a rally in front of the State Opera, in Vienna.
- Canada – On 17 July, a protest was organized by the Armenians in front of the Azerbaijani Embassy in Ottawa, to condemn "Azerbaijan's aggressive policy towards Armenia". The demonstrators handed a letter to Azerbaijan's deputy ambassador, which declared that Azerbaijani government, "in violation of international law, is targeting innocent citizens and threatening to attack Armenia's nuclear power plant" and the Azerbaijani leadership "has no intention of finding a peaceful solution to the conflict". They continued the demonstration in front of the Canadian Parliament. The demonstrators had slogans saying "Canadians against Hate & Crime", "Peace for Nagorno-Karabakh", "Aliyev is a Hatemonger", "Azerbaijan bombing civilians".
  - On 19 July, Azerbaijanis and Turks held a rally in support of the Azerbaijani Army in Toronto and Ontario. Participants chanted slogans in different languages.
  - On July 25 in Ottawa, car rally was organized by the Azerbaijanis living in Canada to protest "Armenian provocations" on the state border of Armenia-Azerbaijan. The cars passed through the streets, passing the buildings of Canadian Parliament, Senate, Foreign Ministry, foreign embassies, including Armenian embassy. Participants demanded Canadian government to take steps in "defending the territorial integrity of Azerbaijan" chanting “Karabakh is Azerbaijan!", "Stop Armenia's aggressive policy!", "Canada must act now!".
  - In Toronto, Armenian demonstrators participated in a car rally, holding Artsakh and Canadian flags. The convoy moved south on Victoria Park, west on Danforth Avenue and Bloor Street to Yonge Street, north on Yonge to Sheppard and east on Sheppard to the Armenian Community Centre of Toronto.
  - In Toronto, Armenians held a protest starting from the Turkish Deputy PM's office (also the Trade Minister), then marched down to the consulate. The protestors held flags of Artsakh and Canada, along with signs saying “Defend Armenia!”, “Stop Azeri & Turkish Aggression”, “Defend Artsakh”, and “Never Forget 1915 2020”.
- Czech Republic – In Prague, dozens of Armenians held a silent protest, condemning aggression in Nagorno Karabakh. Dozens of candles were lit for the victims. The participants in the demonstration held banners condemning ’s aggression and urging the Czechs not to be indifferent to the conflict. The event was organized by the Association of Armenian Youth of the Czech Republic. The protesters held banners with slogans “Peace for Armenians”, “Stop the aggression”, “Don’t be blind”, “Prevent another genocide”, “Killing of civilians must end” and “Czechs, speak.”
- France – On 14 July, the entrance of the Embassy of Azerbaijan in Paris was colored with the notes "No to War", and "Stop Aliyev".
- Georgia – On 16 July, a group of Azerbaijanis gathered in front of the Armenian Embassy to Georgia, in Tbilisi and protested against "Armenia's provocation in the Tovuz direction".
  - On 18 July, Azerbaijanis, holding the flags of Azerbaijan, Georgia, and Turkey in their hands, held a rally to support the Azerbaijani Armed Forces before the Azerbaijani Embassy in Tbilisi.
- Germany – On 18 July, more than 500 Azerbaijanis gathered in front of the Armenian Embassy in Berlin, shouting slogans such as "Karabakh is Azerbaijan!", and "Azerbaijan, we are with you!".
  - Simultaneously, Azerbaijanis also held a rally in Düsseldorf, shouting slogans such as "Karabakh is Azerbaijan", "No to the Armenian terror!", "Justice for Khojaly", "Martyrs do not die, the homeland will not be divided".
  - On the same day, Armenians gathered and held a rally in Munich, chanting "We want peace without weapons". Participants, who were holding the flags and posters of Armenia, sang "When your thoughts fly home". According to Armenian media outlets, there were also Azerbaijanis willing "to silence the song of the Armenian youth with their shouts. For a moment they tried to provoke the protesters, but the German police did not allow it".
  - On 19 July, demonstrations were held in Breslauer Square and in front of the Cologne Cathedral, in Cologne. Demonstrators, who were carrying the Azerbaijani flags in their hands, denounced the "unjust and aggressive attitude of Armenia".
  - On 24 July, a group of 20-30 Azerbaijanis attacked an Armenian-owned hookah bar in Cologne. According to the owner of the bar, one of the masked men, who identified himself and the entire group as Azerbaijanis, asked him if he was Armenian. Then the attackers broke into the hookah bar, threw chairs and smashed windows. Law enforcement agencies suppose that the incident was politically motivated.
- Hungary – On 18 July, about 250 Azerbaijani and Turkish protesters gathered and held a rally against Armenia and in support of the Azerbaijani Army in Heroes' Square, Budapest. The participants were holding the flags of Azerbaijan, Turkey and Hungary, and posters that read "Karabakh belongs to Azerbaijan!", and "End Armenian aggression!".
- Iran – On 17 July, a rally in support of Azerbaijan was held in front of the Azerbaijani Embassy in Tabriz, where participants shouted slogans like "Karabakh is ours, it will remain ours". Voice of America reported that as a result, the "citizens who took part in the rally and gathered in predetermined places were subjected to severe repression", and that "number of detained activists and citizens" was high, but "their identities are unknown". The military forces used tear gas and reportedly clashed with protesters in Tabriz, Ardebil, Tehran and Urmia. 38 were detained during demonstrations.
  - Simultaneously, police and Islamic Revolutionary Guard Corps dispersed the Azerbaijani Iranians trying to gather in front of the Armenian Embassy in Tehran.
- Italy – On 20 July, Azerbaijanis held a rally in Rome to protest against the "recent provocations of Armenian armed forces against Azerbaijan". Protesters, who demonstrated their support for the Azerbaijani Army, chanted slogans such as "Martyrs never die, homeland will never be divided", and "Karabakh is Azerbaijan".
  - On October 13, Armenians held a demonstration in Rome in front of the Montecitorio to ask Italy to condemn the Azerbaijani invasion of Nagorno-Karabakh and call for an end to the violence and clashes.
- Moldova – On 22 July, clashes between Armenians and Azerbaijanis took place in the capital Chișinău. The Congress of Azerbaijanis in Moldova attempted to hold a protest in front of Armenia's Embassy in Chișinău. Armenians of Moldova arranged a counter-protest and stood in front at the entrance to the diplomatic mission. Law enforcement officers had to interfere after which the Azerbaijanis left the site.
- Netherlands – On 18 July, Azerbaijanis gathered in front of the Azerbaijani Embassy in the Hague and held posters, and pictures of the Azerbaijani soldiers and civilians killed in their hands, and chanted slogans in Dutch and English. The Azerbaijani National Anthem, as well as military marches, were played through a loudspeaker. Then, about 100 Armenians also gathered and held a rally in front of the embassy. They held the Armenian flags and shouted slogans such as "Armenia", "Artsakh", and "Aliyev – dictator".
- Poland – On 16 July, groups of Armenians and Azerbaijanis confronted each other at the Azerbaijani embassy in Warsaw. Both sides carried the flags of their countries, with Armenians shouting slogans against “Azerbaijani Violence” while Azerbaijanis had banners reading "Armenia – Aggressor" and "Armenia – Barbarian" with them. According to the Azerbaijani media outlets, 150 Azerbaijanis blocked the way of 30 Armenians trying to commit "acts of vandalism" in front of the Azerbaijani embassy. The participants had to be separated by the police. There were no detentions.
- Turkey – On 19 July, a rally in support of Azerbaijan was held Beyazıt Square in Istanbul.
  - On 25 July, three Armenians, including a mother with a young man, were attacked by Azerbaijanis in Kumkapı. While they were taking a taxi, a group asked them about Karabakh and when Armenians replied they are not interested in these issues, the group attacked them. Two other Armenians over 50 years old were attacked in the district, and a shop run by an Armenian woman was broken. Member of Parliament Garo Paylan said that he had met with Istanbul Governor Ali Yerlikaya to take necessary measures regarding these issues.
- Qatar – On 17 July, Azerbaijanis organized a march in Doha to protest against Armenia and support the Azerbaijani Army, holding the Azerbaijani flag, as well as posters that read "Support the Army!", "Karabakh is Azerbaijan!".
- Ukraine – more than 200 Azerbaijanis and Turks held a rally in support of the Azerbaijani Army in Kyiv. Participants shouted slogans such as "Karabakh is Azerbaijan", "Azerbaijan, we are with you", and “We are Polad”.
- United Kingdom – On 17 July, Azerbaijanis and Turks held a rally in front of the Armenian Embassy in London, where, according to the Azerbaijani media outlets, as a result of the "Armenian provocation", Armenians and Azerbaijanis clashed, injuring one Azerbaijani. According to Armenian media outlets, the demonstration turned into fighting after "an Azerbaijani woman ran away and snatched a poster from one of the Armenians", who were "protecting the embassy from the protesting Azerbaijanis".
  - On 28 July in London, according to Armenian media, the Armenian youth in the UK staged a protest in front of the BBC office in London in order to call attention to the recent clashes. Protesters were chanting "Armenia" and "Artsakh" and singing the national anthem of Armenia. A group of Azerbaijanis allegedly tried to "attack the protesters, but the local police managed to keep them in order".
  - On July 28 in London, according to Azerbaijani media, more than 300 Azerbaijanis held a peaceful rally to bring attention to the clashes on Armenian-Azerbaijani border. The protest started in front of the office of BBC, continued through Trafalgar Square and ended in front of the office of British Prime Minister. The participants were chanting “My country is under occupation”, “Karabakh is Azerbaijan”, “Stop Armenian Aggression” and singing the national anthem of Azerbaijan, as well as the song “Sari gelin”. A group of Armenians allegedly tried to disrupt the action, but local police officers were involved to ensure the security.
- United States – On 17 July, hundreds of Azerbaijanis and Turks gathered in front of the Armenian embassy in Washington, DC and protested. The protesters marched in front of the embassy with the flags of Azerbaijan and Turkey in their hands, with posters that read "Stop the occupation", "Shame on Armenia", "Justice for Karabakh", "Karabakh belongs to Azerbaijan" and called on the American public "not to remain silent about the injustice".
  - On 20 July, Azerbaijanis held a rally in front of the Armenian Embassy in Washington, D.C. Participants chanted slogans such as "Karabakh belongs to Azerbaijan", and "Martyrs never die, the homeland will never be divided". At the same time an Armenian demonstration was held by the Armenian Youth Federation (FYD), with the message “Armenia wants peace, Azerbaijan wants war.” They flashed peace signs and condemned the targeting of Armenian civilians, however they were met with Grey Wolves terrorist signs by the Azerbaijani counter protestors.
  - On July 24 in New-York, Azerbaijanis organized a rally with slogans and posters saying "Karabakh is Azerbaijan", "Murderers of children, stop the aggression!", "Azerbaijan wants peace, Armenia wants war” in front of the UN headquarters and Armenian Permanent Mission to the UN. They demanded the UN take actions against Armenia regarding not implementing the UN SC resolutions.
  - On 26 July in New York, the Armenian Youth Federation Eastern Region USA lead protest at the Permanent Mission of Azerbaijan to the United Nations holding the Armenian flag, as well as posters that read “Azerbaijan wants war. Armenia wants peace”, "Stop Aliyev", "Artsakh Strong". The AYF called on the United States and the international community to forcefully condemn Azerbaijan for the military attacks on military and civilian targets in Armenia.
  - On 26 July in Boston, a group of young Armenians were performing Armenian folk and martial dance Yarkhushta outside the Harvard Square subway station while the group of Azerbaijanis were allegedly "trying to interrupt the flashmob". Armenian participants were holding a massive sign that read, “Azerbaijan wants war. Armenia wants peace.”
  - On July 27 in Saint Paul, a peaceful protest organized by the Minnesota-Azerbaijan Association was held in which the participants called the US Congress and international community to take decisive steps to stop the actions committed by Armenia and to restore the territorial integrity of Azerbaijan.
  - On August 1 in Houston, the Armenian community held a protest "against the Azerbaijani aggression". Demonstrators also gathered to support Tavush, Artsakh and Armenian soldiers on the front line with slogans and posters saying “Stop Aliyev Now”, “Stop Azerbaijani Aggression”, “Tavush Strong” and "Artsakh Strong".
  - On October 3, over 100 Armenian protestors waving the Armenian flag temporarily blocked the 101 freeway in Los Angeles in protest against Azerbaijan aggression, and to promote Armenian human rights.
  - On October 5 in Los Angeles, thousands of Armenians have gathered outside the Turkish Consulate in Los Angeles, as well as marching in Glendale and assembling in front of the buildings of CNN and the Los Angeles Times with posters calling “Peace for Armenians.” The demonstrations appeared to be largely peaceful.
