= Turks in Ukraine =

Ethnic group in Ukraine

Total population
- 9,180 (2001 census); 15,000 Meskhetian Turks (2018 estimate) plus 20,000 Turkish nationals (pre-2022 Russian invasion)

Regions with significant populations
- Kherson Oblast: 3,736
- Donetsk Oblast: 1,791
- Crimea: 969
- Mykolaiv Oblast: 758

Languages
- Turkish; Ukrainian

Religion
- Predominantly Sunni Islam; Minority Alevism, other religions, and irreligious
- a: In the 2001 Ukrainian census 8,844 people were recorded as "Turks" and 336 were recorded as "Meskhetian Turks".

Turks in Ukraine (Turkish: Ukrayna'daki Türkler) are people of Turkish ethnicity living in Ukraine. The first Turkish settlement started during the Ottoman rule of Ukraine. In addition, there has been modern migration to the country largely formed of Meskhetian Turks, followed by immigrants from Turkey and Turkish communities from other post-Ottoman territories, such as Turkish Cypriots from Northern Cyprus.

== History ==
=== Ottoman migration ===
The First All-Union Census of the Soviet Union in 1926 recorded 8,570 Ottoman Turks living in the Soviet Union. The Ottoman Turks are no longer listed separately in the census, it is presumed that those who were living in Ukraine have either been assimilated into Ukrainian society or have left the country.

=== Meskhetian Turks migration ===
The majority of Turkish Meskhetians arrived in the eastern region of Ukraine in 1989-90 as persecuted refugees who had experienced two deportations; the first from Georgia in 1944, and then Uzbekistan in 1989-90. Initially, they were forced to leave their homeland in the Meskheti region of Georgia when the Soviet Union was preparing to launch a pressure campaign against Turkey. Nationalistic policies at the time encouraged the slogan: "Georgia for Georgians" and that the Meskhetian Turks should be sent to Turkey "where they belong". Joseph Stalin deported the majority of Meskhetian Turks to Uzbekistan, thousands dying en route in cattle-trucks, however, in 1989, the Meskhetian Turks in Uzbekistan became the victims of riots by the ethnic Uzbeks. Thus, the majority of the Turkish Meskhetian community were deported for a second time, many coming to Ukraine during 1989-1990 following ethnic persecution in the Ferghana Valley. Others followed later to re-unite with their relatives. The majority mostly settled in Crimea, Donetsk, Kherson, and Mykolaiv. A few live in Kyiv. In 1991, they were granted Ukrainian citizenship.

=== Mainland Turkish migration ===
Ukraine has witnessed increasing numbers of immigrants from Turkey. By 2009, 5,394 Turkish citizens were living in Ukraine. Prior to the 2022 Russian invasion of Ukraine, the number of Turkish citizens had increased to around 20,000.

=== Turkish Cypriot migration ===
In the twenty-first century, Turkish Cypriots have arrived in Ukraine both as temporary and permanent residents.

== Demographics ==
According to the 2001 Ukrainian Census, 8,844 were recorded as "Turks" and 336 people were recorded as "Meskhetian Turks". Of those who were recorded only as "Turks", the majority lived in Kherson (3,736), Donetsk (1,791), Crimea (969) and Mykolaiv Oblast (758).

In 2018, the number of Meskhetian Turks alone numbered approximately 15,000.

=== Census history ===
Census	Recorded as "Turks" only	Recorded as "Meskhetian Turks" only
1939	853	N/A
1959	284	N/A
1970	226	N/A
1979	257	N/A
1989	262	N/A
2001	8,844	336

== Religion ==
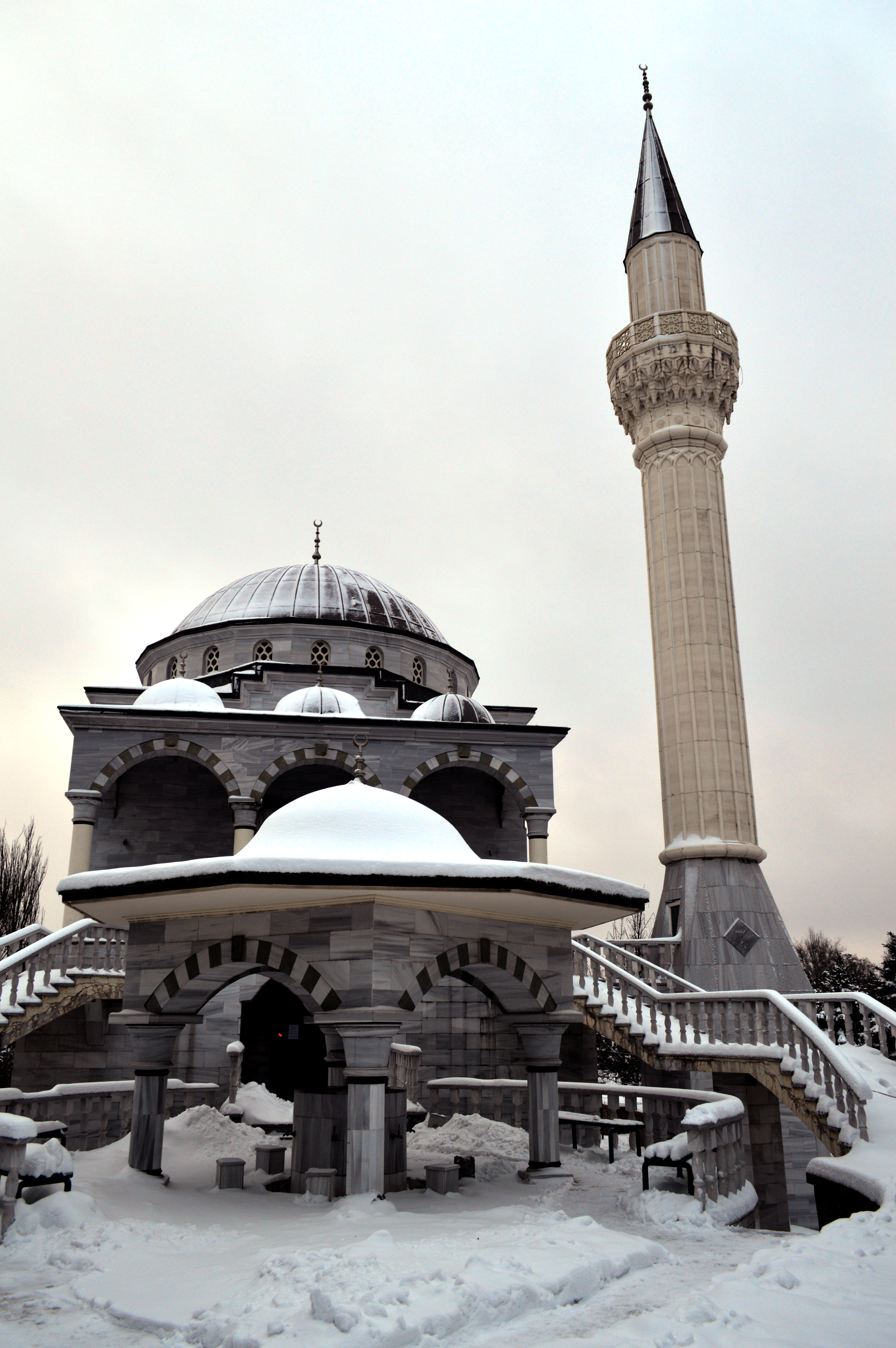
Sultan Suleiman Mosque in Mariupol, Ukraine

Opened in 2005, the Sultan Suleiman Mosque was also built in Mariupol and named after the Ottoman sultan Suleiman the Magnificent. It was built by a Turkish Businessman (Salih Cihan). Five times prayers along with the Friday Prayers are offered at the mosque. During the 2022 Russian invasion of Ukraine, at least 300 Turks, and hundreds more family members (without Turkish citizenship), were trapped in Mariupol; at least 150 people took refuge in the Sultan Suleiman Mosque. The mosque is run by Turkey’s Directorate of Religious Affairs.

== Education ==
The Simferopol International School opened by Turkish entrepreneurs in the Autonomous Republic of Crimea in Ukraine has been listed the top school in the list of the country’s best 100 schools. Turkish, English, Crimean Tatar, and French are taught at the school. In the third year since its establishment, the school has achieved several successes in the Olympics held in the city and across the country. The Turkish school also won a bronze medal in the International Environmental Project Olympics (INEPO) held in Turkey.

The Turkish Maarif Foundation plans to open a school in Kyiv. This was announced by the Ambassador of Ukraine Ahmet Guldere and the President of the Foundation Dr. Birol Akgun.

== 2022 Russian invasion of Ukraine ==
Upon the 2022 Russian invasion of Ukraine, nearly 9,000 Turks with Turkish citizenship were reported to have evacuated the country by 3 March, having arrived in Turkey with Turkish Airlines flights from Warsaw and Bucharest.

On February 25, 2022, the Ministry of Foreign Affairs of Northern Cyprus strongly recommended all Turkish Cypriot citizens to leave Ukraine. Assistance was provided at the TRNC Representative Office in Budapest.

On March 17, 2022, the Turkish Foreign Minister, Mevlüt Çavuşoğlu, announced that Turkey had evacuated 15,196 Turkish citizens since the start of the war. Among them were Meskhetian Turks who had already acquired Turkish citizenship, having previously settled in the Üzümlü district of Erzincan in 2015 due to the 2014 Annexation of Crimea by the Russian Federation. Some of these Meskhetian Turks from Erzincan had later returned to Ukraine; thus, the 2022 evacuation back to Turkey has meant that "some of them have seen three deportations in their lifetime."

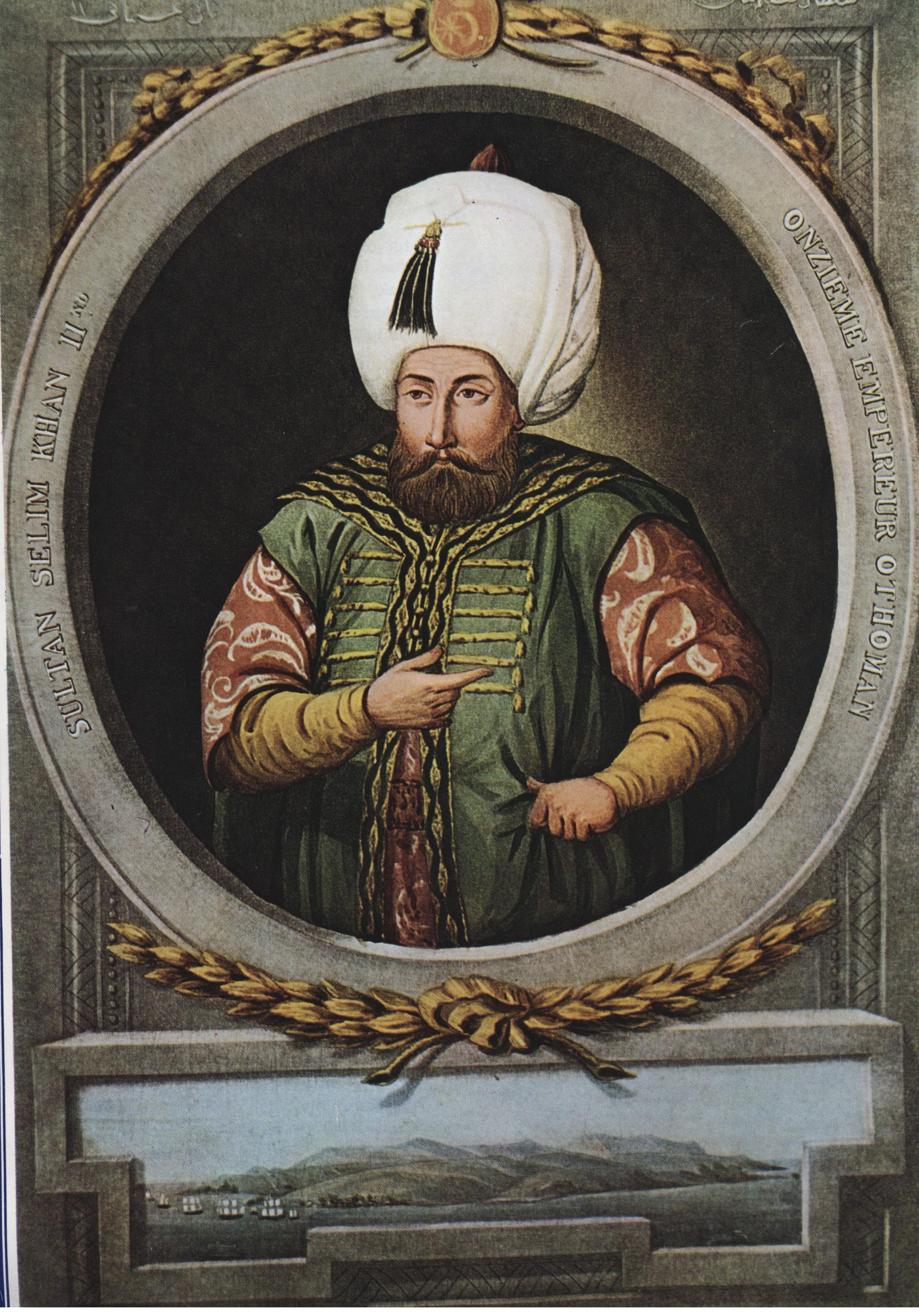
Selim II

== Notable people ==
It is known that the territories of modern Southern Ukraine were part of the Ottoman Empire. Sultans of the Ottoman Empire, Selim II and Meghmed IV, were half Ukrainians. Because their mothers were Ukrainian.

- Miray Akay, actress (Turkish father)
- Elvira Kamaloğlu, female wrestling champion (Turkish Meskhetian origin)
- Vasily Kapnist, playwright and nobleman (Turkish mother)
- Alemdar Karamanov, composer (Turkish father)
- Dzhemal Kyzylatesh, football player
- Emre Manuila, football player
- Emrah Ormanoğlu, freestyle wrestler (Turkish Meskhetian origin)
- Irma St. Paule, actress (Turkish father)

== Gallery ==
Ottoman architecture in Ukraine

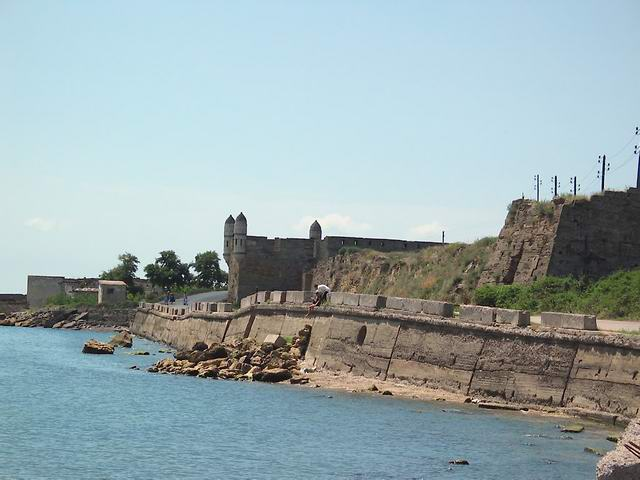
Yenikale, the Eastern side

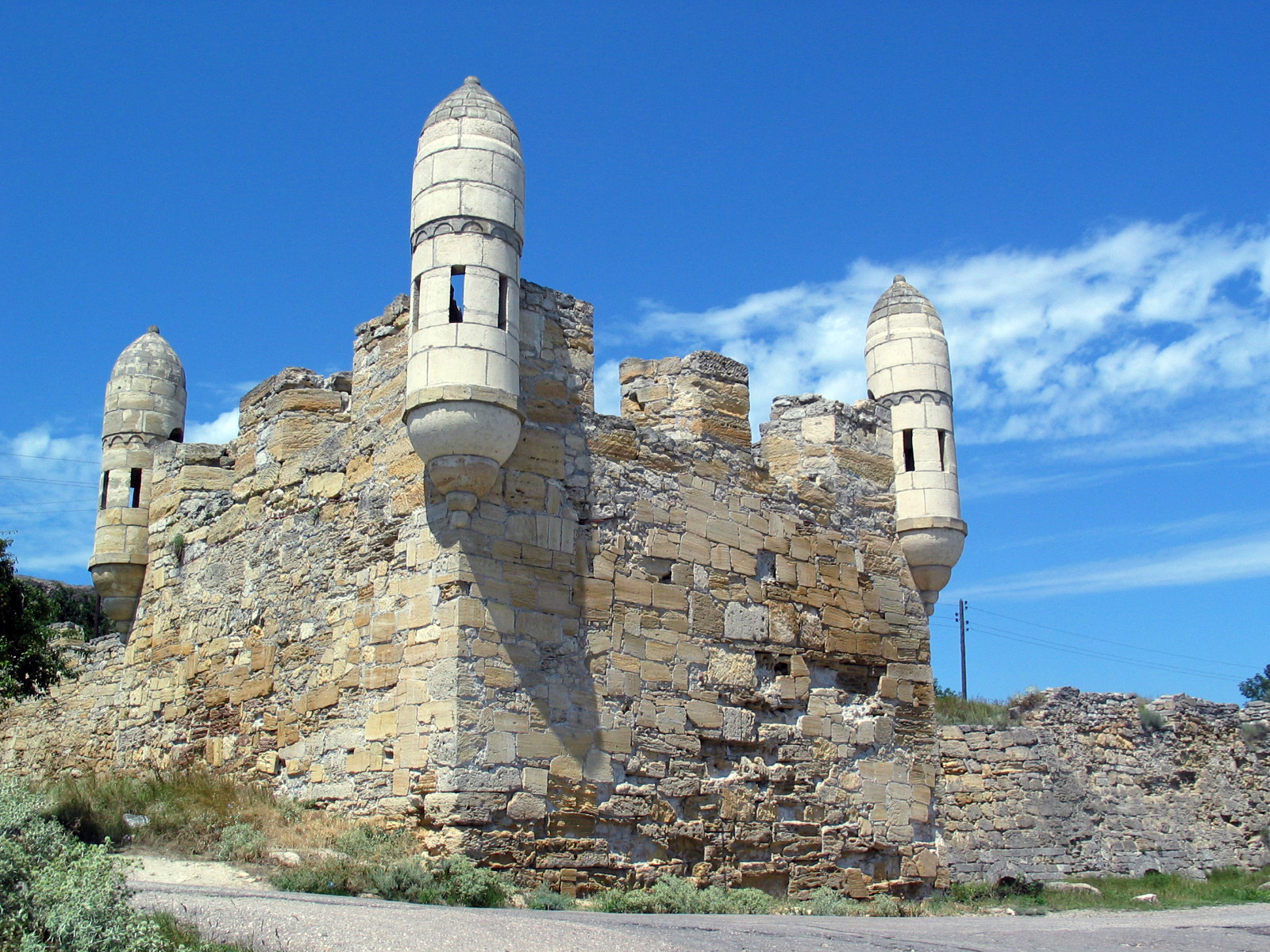
Yenikale, South-West Tower

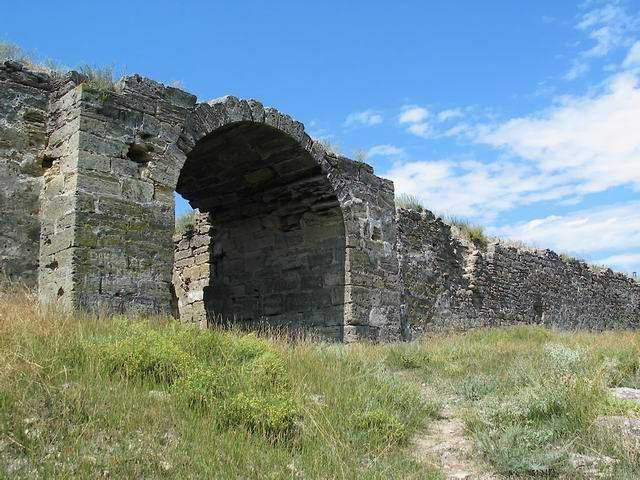
Yenikale, the Northern Wall

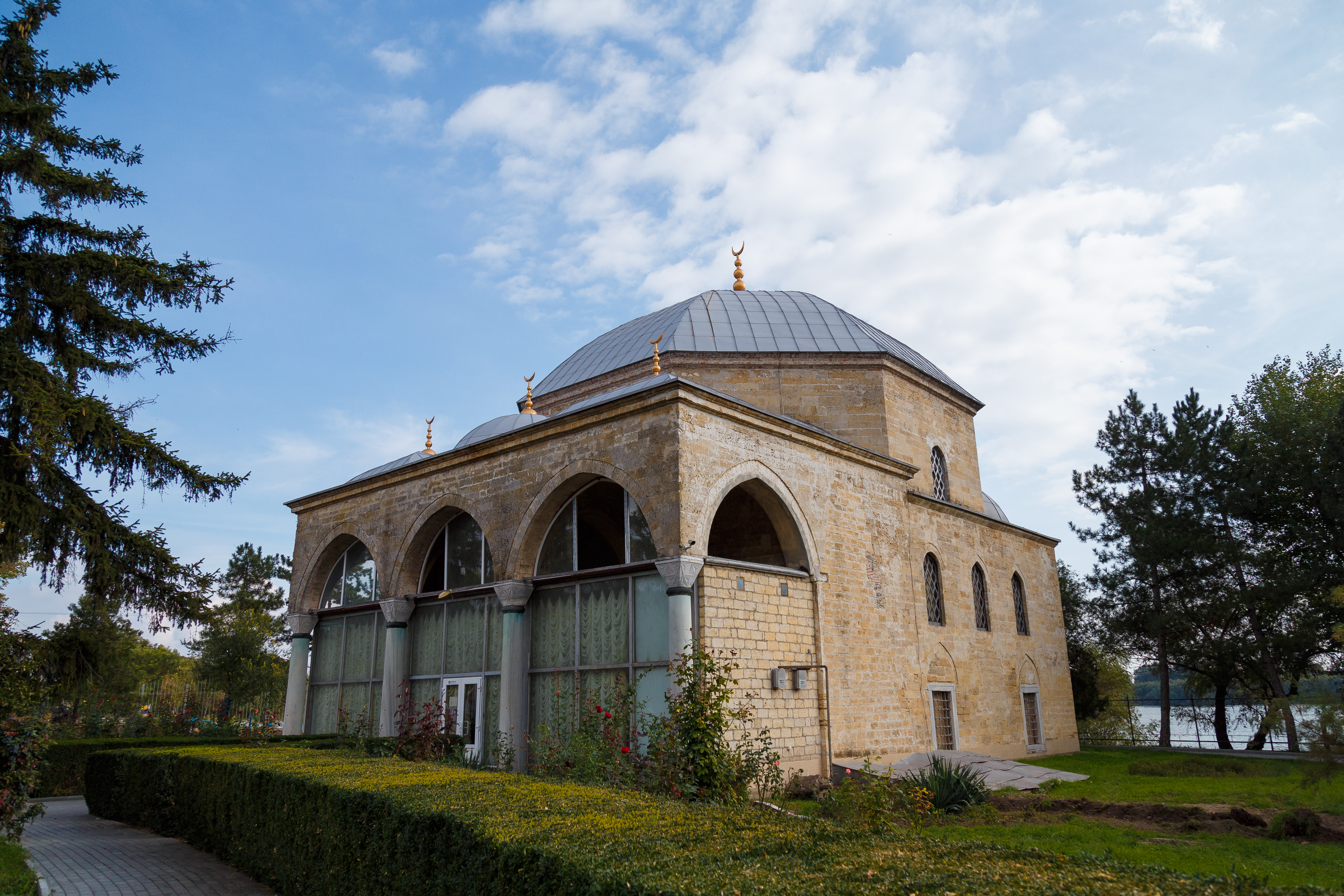
Kuchuk Jami in the city of Izmail

== See also ==
- Turkey–Ukraine relations
- Crimea
- Izmail
- Turks in Hungary
- Turks in Poland
- Turks in Romania
- Turks in Russia
- Azerbaijanis in Ukraine

== Bibliography ==
- Akiner, Shirin (1983), Islamic Peoples of the Soviet Union, Taylor & Francis, ISBN 0-7103-0025-5.
- Aydıngün, Ayşegül; Harding, Çigğdem Balım; Hoover, Matthew; Kuznetsov, Igor; Swerdlow, Steve (2006), Meskhetian Turks: An Introduction to their History, Culture, and Resettelment Experiences (PDF), Center for Applied Linguistics, archived from the original (PDF) on 2007-07-14.
- Bennigsen, Alexandre; Broxup, Marie (1983), The Islamic threat to the Soviet state, Taylor & Francis, ISBN 0-7099-0619-6.
- Cornell, Svante E. (2001), Small nations and great powers: a study of ethnopolitical conflict in the Caucasus, Routledge, ISBN 0-7007-1162-7.
- Council of Europe (2006), Documents: working papers, 2005 ordinary session (second part), 25-29 April 2005, Vol. 3: Documents 10407, 10449-10533, Council of Europe, ISBN 92-871-5754-5.
- Kurbanov, Rafik Osman-Ogly; Kurbanov, Erjan Rafik-Ogly (1995), "Religion and Politics in the Caucasus", in Bourdeaux, Michael (ed.), The Politics of Religion in Russia and the New States of Eurasia, M.E. Sharpe, ISBN 1-56324-357-1.
- Pentikäinen, Oskari; Trier, Tom (2004), Between Integration and Resettlement: The Meskhetian Turks, European Centre For Minority Issues.
- Ryazantsev, Sergey V. (2009), "Turkish Communities in the Russian Federation" (PDF), International Journal on Multicultural Societies, 11 (2): 155–173.
- Tomlinson, Kathryn (2005), "Living Yesterday in Today and Tomorrow: Meskhetian Turks in Southern Russia", in Crossley, James G.; Karner, Christian (eds.), Writing History, Constructing Religion, Ashgate Publishing, ISBN 0-7546-5183-5.
