= Russian strikes on religious sites during the invasion of Ukraine =

During the Russian invasion of Ukraine, hundreds of religious buildings have been damaged or destroyed by missile, air, and drone attacks. According to UNESCO, at least 154 religious sites had been verified as damaged by June 2026, while Ukrainian government and religious-monitoring groups report much higher totals, exceeding 700 religious sites of various faiths. A January 2026 report by Mission Eurasia states that at least 737 religious buildings have been destroyed by Russian forces since the start of the full-scale invasion in 2022, including about 450 Baptist churches even though Baptists represent only 1-2% of the overall Ukrainian population. Besides churches, several mosques, synagogues, and other religious sites have also been attacked like the Sultan Suleiman Mosque in Mariupol that was affected by Russian shelling on 12 March 2022 despite sheltering more than 80 civilians including Turkish citizens.

== History ==
On 30 May 2022, two monks and a nun were killed when Russian forces stormed the area near the Sviatohirsk Lavra in Donetsk Oblast. On 4 June 2026, the St. George's Skete, a historic traditional wooden church, was burned after being hit by Russian artillery rounds, leaving only its brick foundations and thousands of iron nails.

Between 19 and 23 July 2023, the Russian Federation launched a series of drone and missile attacks against Odesa and destroyed civilian infrastructure, including cultural and religious buildings like the Transfiguration Cathedral, prompting condemnation from UNESCO.

On 10 June 2025, a blast wave from a large Russian drone attack damaged part of the central apse on the eastern facade of the Saint Sophia Cathedral in Kyiv.

On 16 April 2026, the Russian Air Force dropped guided glide bombs on Zaporizhzhia killing the pastor, Ruslan Utyuzh, and wounding several others at an evangelical Baptist church House of the Gospel. The general secretary and CEO of the Baptist World Alliance, Elijah Brown, released a statement saying, “the ongoing targeting of churches, and places of worship must come to an immediate stop”.

On 25 April 2026, around 06:00am, a KAB-500S-E carrying 500 to 1,500 kg of explosives exploded near the Transfiguration of the Lord Pentecostal Church in Sloviansk. The bomb destroyed half of the roof and most of the doors and windows. After the bombing, some 170 churchgoers arrived later on the same day to remove debris and hold a Sunday worship service the next day.

On 14 June 2026, the Kyiv Pechersk Lavra was hit by a Geran-2 drone, resulting in a significant fire and damage to the main dome and roof of the historic Assumption Cathedral. "(T)he roof of one of the holiest places in the Christian world — the Assumption Cathedral of the Kyiv Pechersk Lavra — is burning," said Metropolitan Epiphanius, head of the Orthodox Church of Ukraine (OCU). Amid the attack, efforts were made for the emergency evacuation of ancient icons and religious relics, according to a Facebook post by Bishop Avraamii. This was the first time that the structure was targeted since World War II.

Regarding the Kyiv Pechersk Lavra drone strike, The Kyiv Independent noted that Eastern Orthodoxy in Russia served as a political instrument, a tool of legitimacy or another branch of state power, with Russia lecturing the world on Christianity and on "protecting Orthodoxy"; while at the same time bombing churches and persecuting Ukrainian priests in the Russian-occupied territories of the country.

On 22 September 2026, Russia struck the St. John the Baptist Church in Kramatorsk, Donetsk Oblast, alongside other around 70 civilian targets in the city, killing one person and injuring five. The church suffered extensive damage, including in its walls, roof and dome.

== See also ==
- War crimes in the Russian invasion of Ukraine
- Russian war crimes
- Russian war crimes during the Syrian civil war
- War crimes in the Syrian civil war
