= Turks in Hungary =

Ethnic group in Hungary

Total population
- Turkish citizens: 6,500 (2024 est.)

Regions with significant populations
- Budapest, Pécs, Siklós

Languages
- Turkish · Hungarian

Religion
- Predominantly Islam

The Turks in Hungary, also referred to as Turkish Hungarians and Hungarian Turks, (Hungarian: Magyarországi törökök, Turkish: Macaristan Türkleri) refers to ethnic Turks living in Hungary.

== History ==
Much of the Turkish population in Hungary stems from the country’s centuries-long history with the Ottoman Empire, particularly during the Ottoman conquest and rule in Hungary (1521-1718). At its height, the Ottoman Empire occupied all of present-day Hungary except a northwestern region covering roughly Western Transdanubia. A second wave of Ottoman-Turkish migration occurred in the late 19th century when relations between the Ottoman Empire and Austria-Hungary improved; most of these immigrants settled in Budapest. Moreover, there has also been a recent migration of Turks from the Republic of Turkey, as well as other post-Ottoman states (such as Bulgaria).

== Culture ==
=== Language ===
Most Hungarian Turks are bilingual and can speak both Turkish and Hungarian. Moreover, due to the Ottoman rule during the 16th-17th centuries, the Turkish language has also influenced greater Hungarian society; today, there are still numerous Turkish loanwords in the Hungarian language.

| Turkish | Hungarian | English |
|---|---|---|
| Cebimde çok küçük elma var | Zsebemben sok kicsi alma van | I have many small apples in my pocket |

=== Religion ===
The Turkish people, alongside the Arabs, make up the majority of the Muslim population in Hungary. Several Ottoman-Turkish historical mosques are used by the Muslim community, including the Yakovali Hassan Pasha Mosque in Pécs, and the Malkoch Bey Mosque in Siklos.

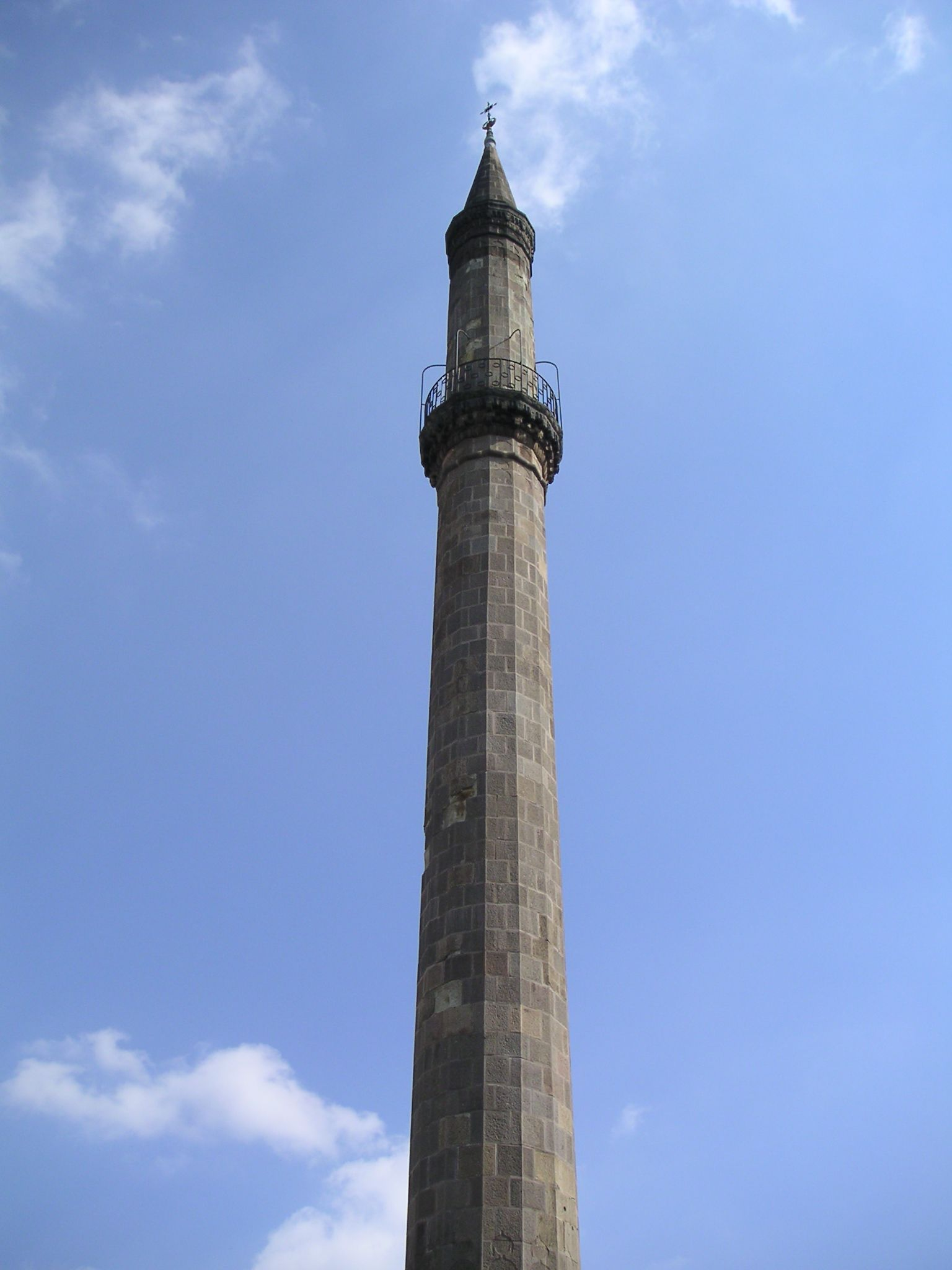
The Eger minaret.

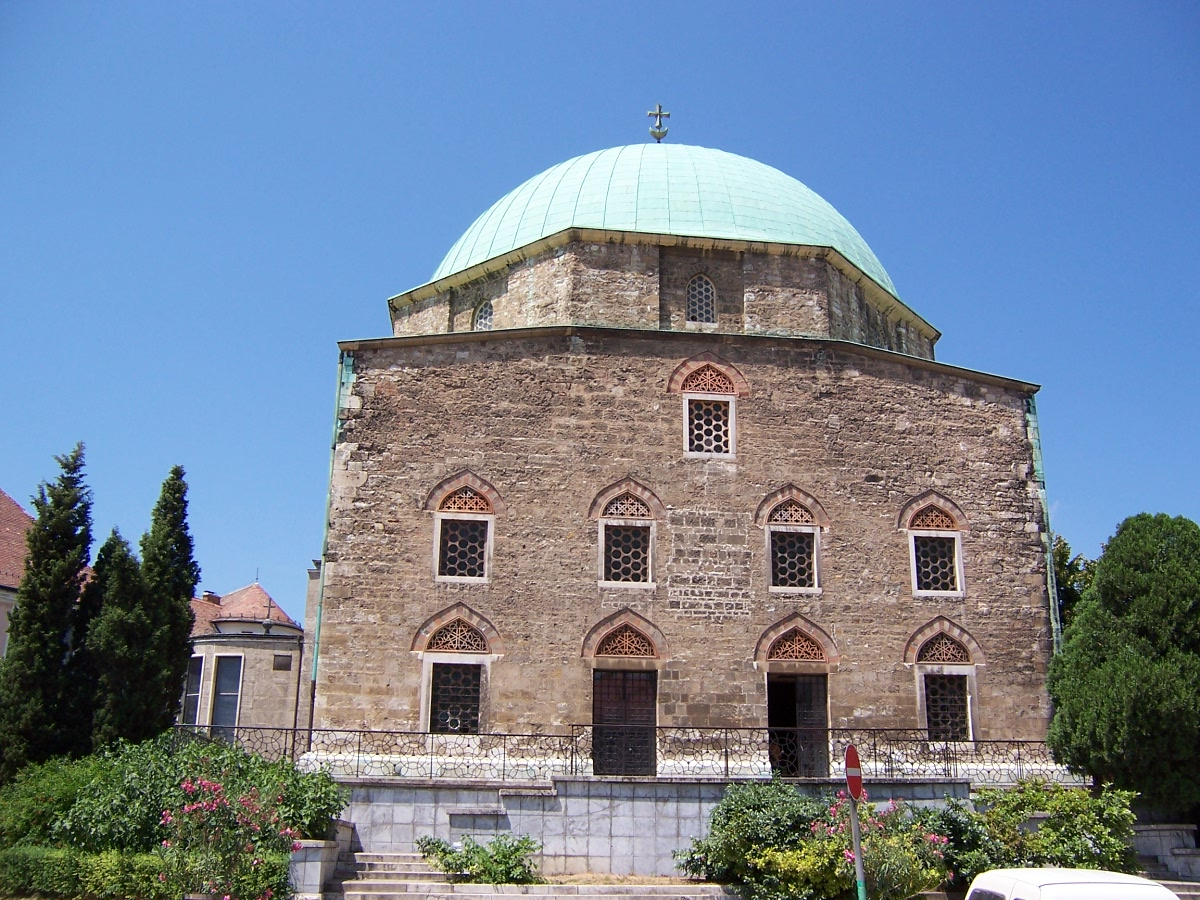
Mosque of Pasha Qasim in Pécs (now a church).

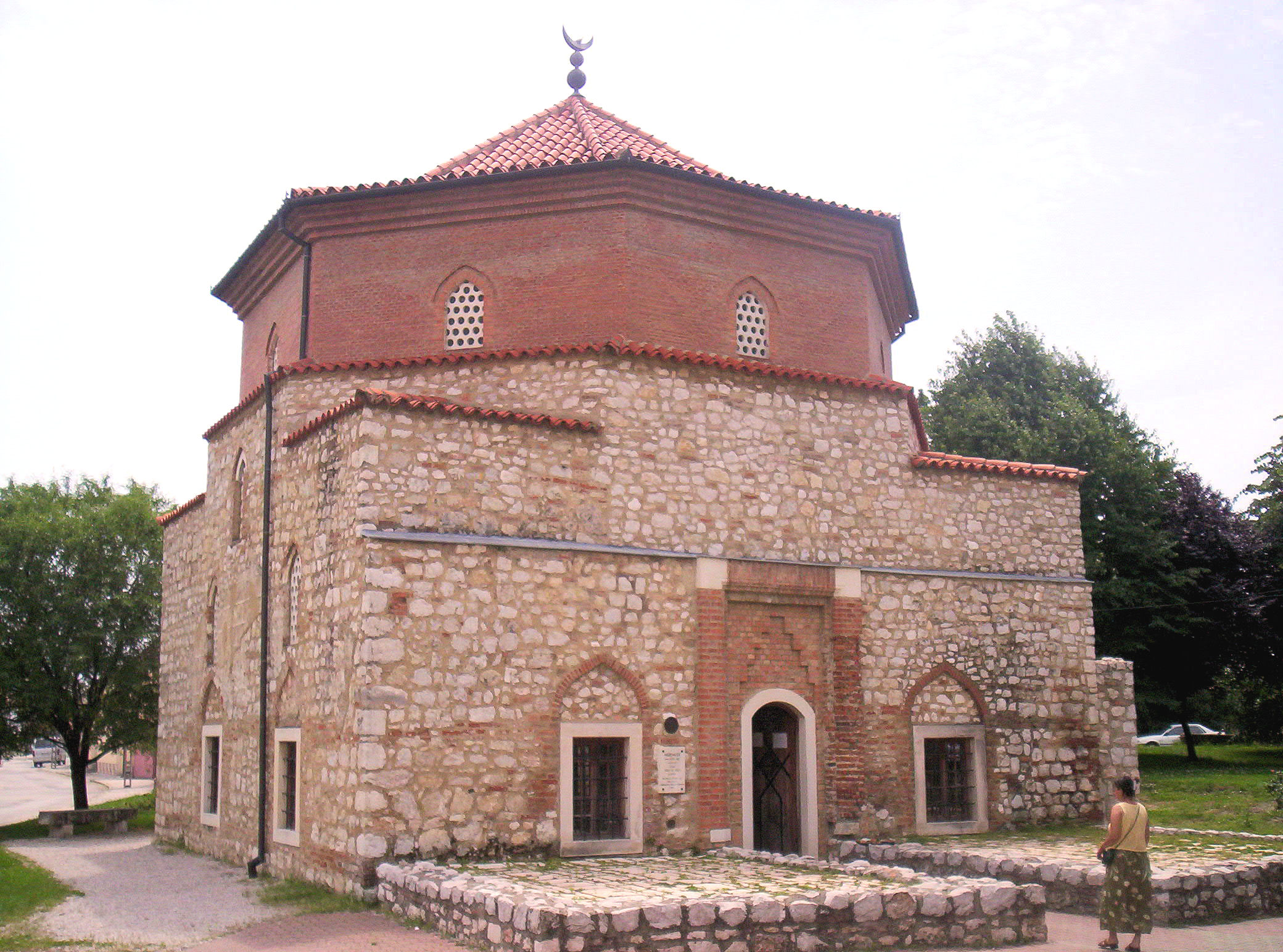
Malkoch Bey Mosque in Siklos

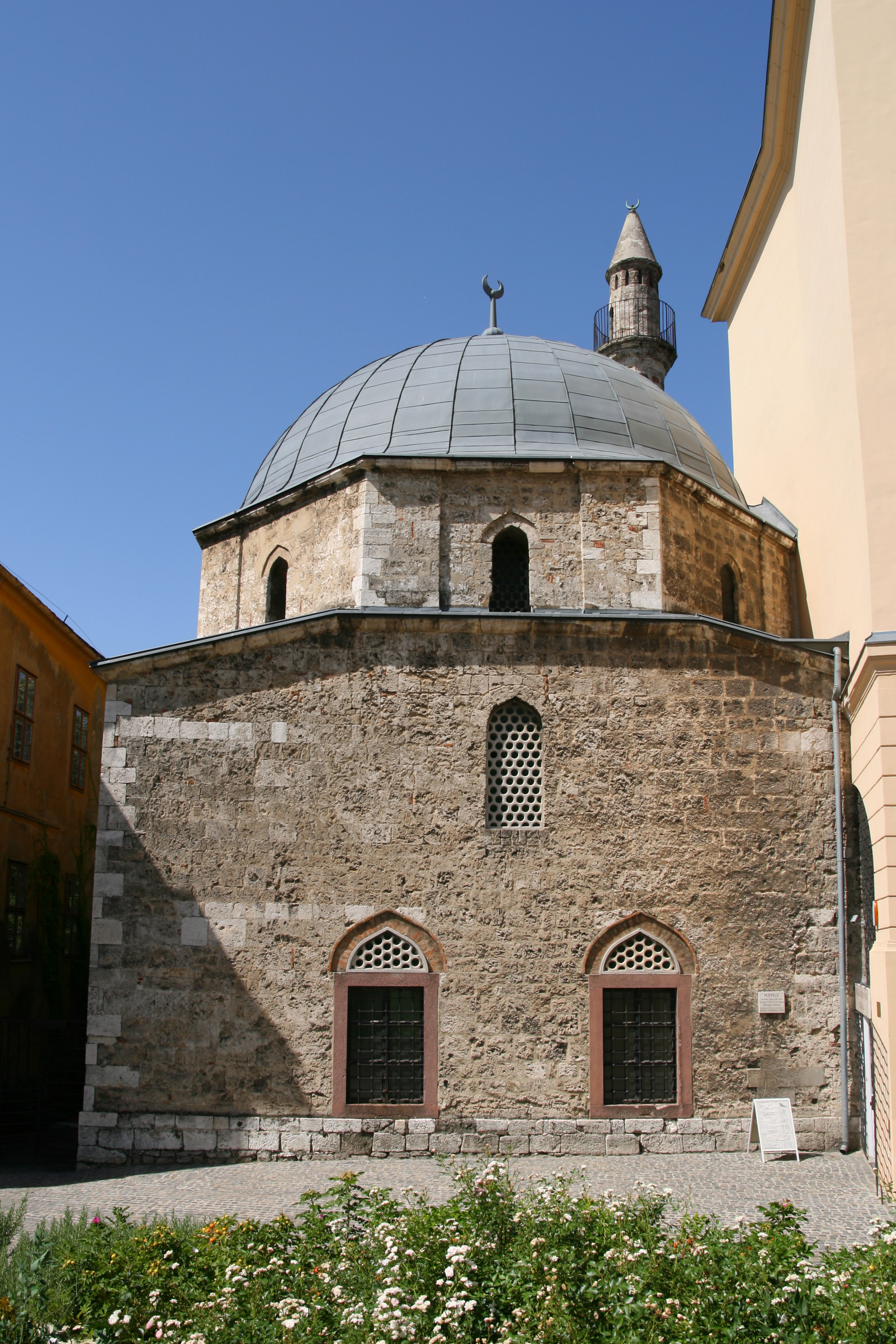
Yakovali Hassan Mosque in Pécs

== Population ==
According to the 2001 census, 2,711 inhabitants declared their language under the "Turkish language family", of which, the majority (57.73%) stated that they belonged to the "Ottoman Turkish" ethnicity (1,565). Furthermore, 12 individuals declared to be "Turk" and 91 "Romanian-Turkish" (see Turks of Romania); the rest declared other Turkic ethnicities. In the 2011 census 5,209 inhabitants declared themselves under "Török nyelvek" ("Turkish languages"); however, the publication does not show the distinction between different Turkic groups.

In addition, there is also approximately 2,500 recent Turkish immigrants from Turkey living in Hungary.

== Organizations and associations ==
In 2005 the Turkish community, alongside ethnic Hungarian Muslims, established "The Dialogue Platform". By 2012, a new Turkish cultural association the "Gül Baba Turkish-Hungarian Cultural Association" was established in Szentendre, near Budapest.

== Notable people ==
- Zakaria Erzinçlioğlu, Britain's leading forensic entomologist
- György Ekrem-Kemál, far-right politician (Turkish father and Hungarian mother)
- İbrahim Peçevi, Ottoman historian-chronicler (Turkish father and Bosnian mother); his name means "İbrahim of Pécs"
- Can Togay, actor, film director, and creator of the Shoes on the Danube Bank Holocaust memorial

== See also ==
- Ottoman Hungary
  - Siege of Eger
  - Gül Baba
  - Király Baths
  - Rudas Baths
- Hungary–Turkey relations
  - Hungarian-Turkish Friendship Park
- Turanism
  - Hungarian Turanism
- Magyarab
- Kaliz
- Turks in Europe
  - Turks in Austria
  - Turks in Croatia
  - Turks in the Czech Republic
  - Turks in Poland
  - Turks of Romania
  - Turks in Serbia
  - Turks in Ukraine
