= Czech Republic–Turkey relations =

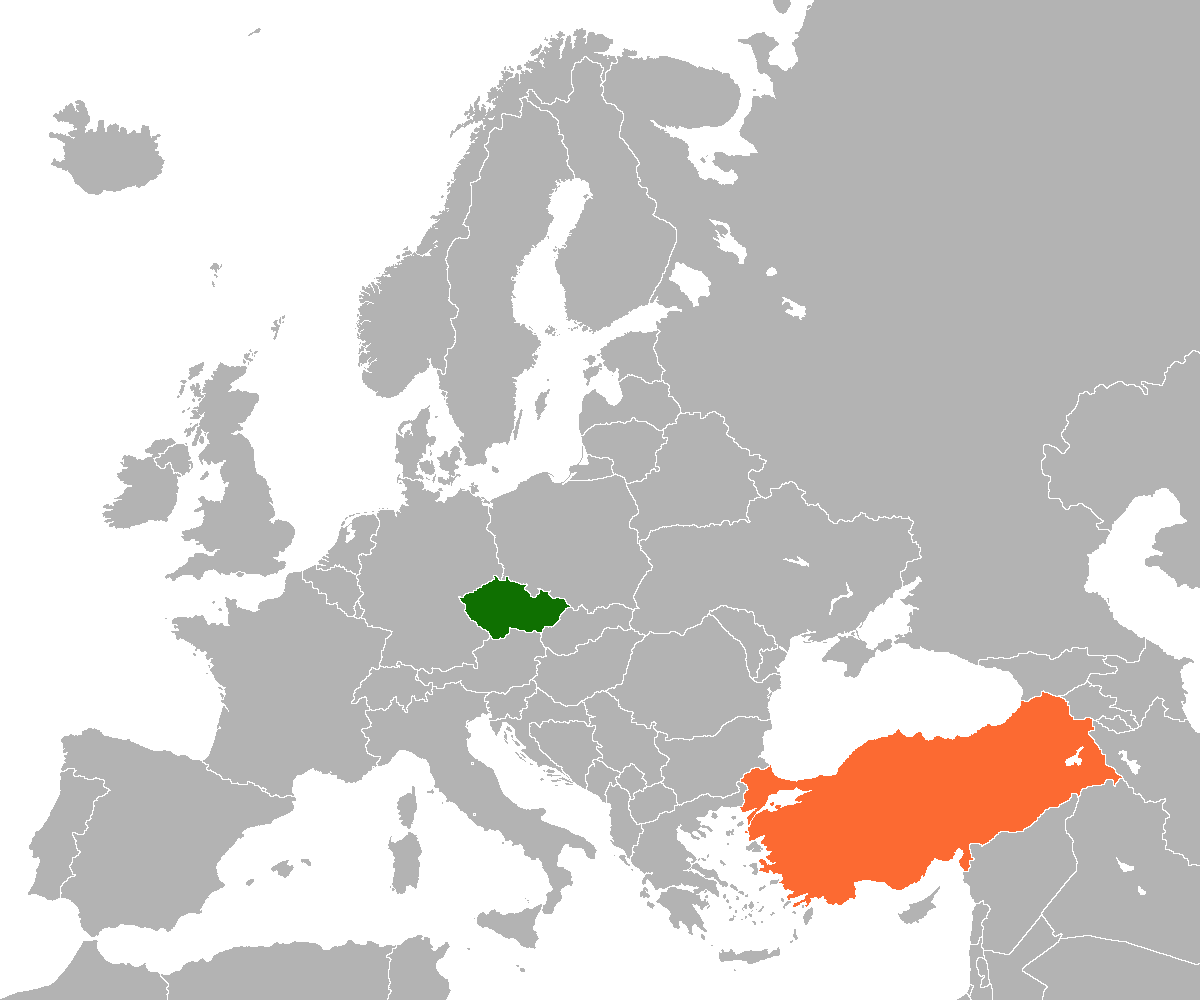
- Czech Republic: Turkey

Czech Republic–Turkey relations are foreign relations between Czech Republic and Turkey.

In 1993, Turkey formally recognized both the Slovakia and Czech Republic as separate, sovereign states. Diplomatic relations and the Turkish Embassy in Prague were established on January 4, 1993. Both countries are full members of Council of Europe and of NATO.

== History ==
Relations between Czechoslovakia and Turkey had been excellent until 1948, when relations rapidly deteriorated because of disagreements over the compensation for the nationalization of the property owned by Turkish businesses.

Trade relations were modest but limited because of Turkey's refusal to participate in a trade agreement until the claims of nationalized businesses were settled.

Relations were also tense because of Czechoslovakia's alignment against Israel in the Middle East, which was Turkey’s closest ally in the region.

In 1993, Turkey formally recognized both the Slovak Republic and the Czech Republic as separate, sovereign states. Diplomatic relations and the Turkish Embassy in Bratislava were established on January 4, 1993.

Czech Republic and Turkey have strong diplomatic ties and cooperate in the military and law enforcement areas since Czech Republic joined the NATO Alliance.

== Presidential visits ==
Guest	Host	Place of visit	Date of visit
(Czech Republic) President Václav Havel	(Turkey) President Ahmet Necdet Sezer	Ankara	October 10–12, 2000
(Turkey) President Abdullah Gül	(Czech Republic) President Václav Klaus	Prague Castle, Prague	April 29–30, 2009
(Czech Republic) President Václav Klaus	(Turkey) President Abdullah Gül	Ankara	February 14–17, 2012
(Czech Republic) Prime Minister Andrej Babiš	(Turkey) President Recep Tayyip Erdoğan	Presidential Complex, Ankara	September 2–4, 2018

== Economic relations ==
- Trade volume between the two countries was US$3.65 billion in 2018 (Turkish exports/imports: 1/2.65 billion USD).
- Over 228 thousand Czech tourists visited Turkey in 2018, an increase by 181% compared to the previous year.

== Resident diplomatic missions ==
- Czech Republic has an embassy in Ankara and an consulate-general in Istanbul.
- Turkey has an embassy in Prague.
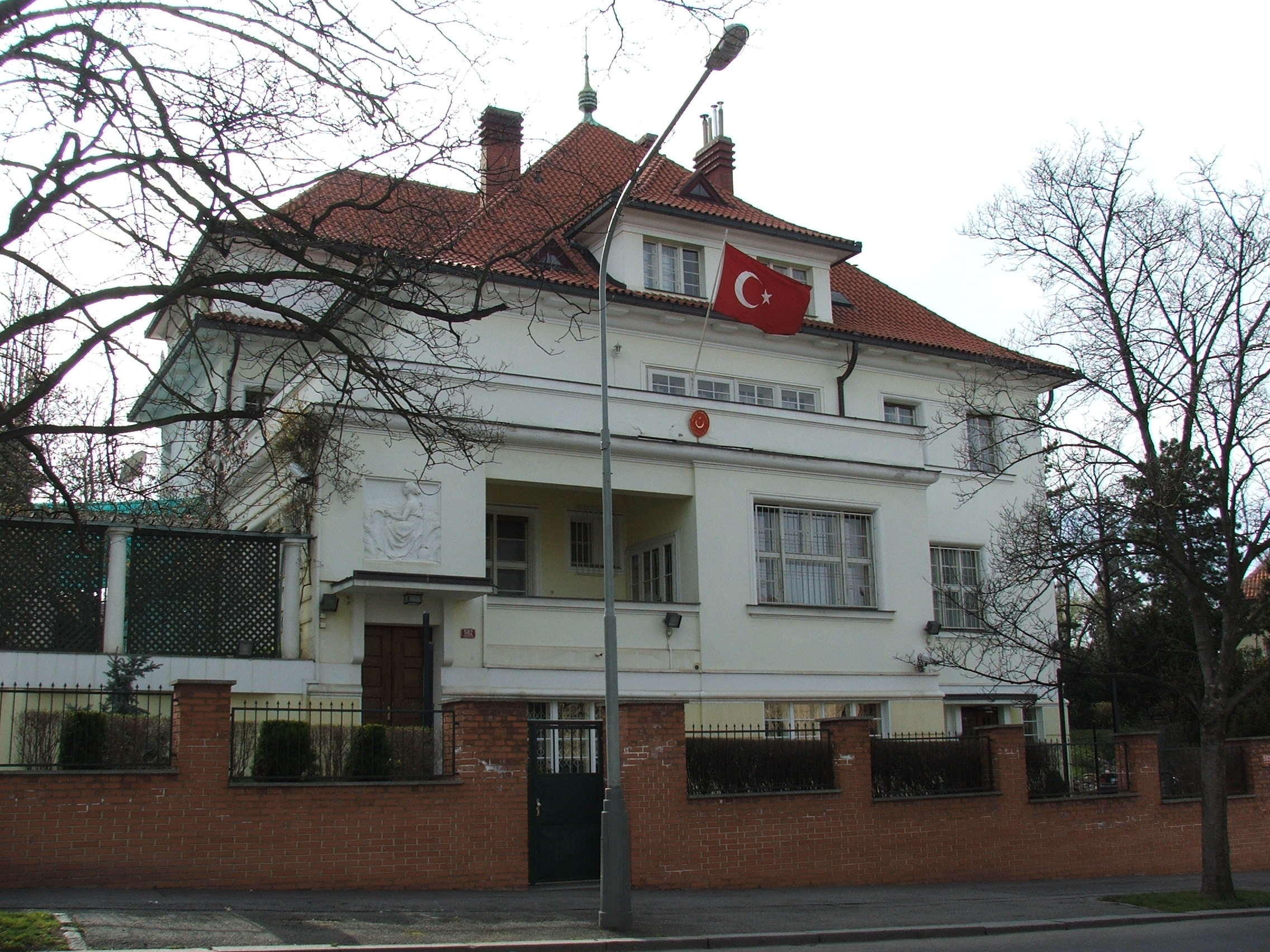
Embassy of Turkey in Prague

== See also ==
- Foreign relations of Czech Republic
- Foreign relations of Turkey
- Turks in the Czech Republic
- Turkey-EU relations
  - Accession of Turkey to the EU
- NATO-EU relations
