= Hungary–Turkey relations =

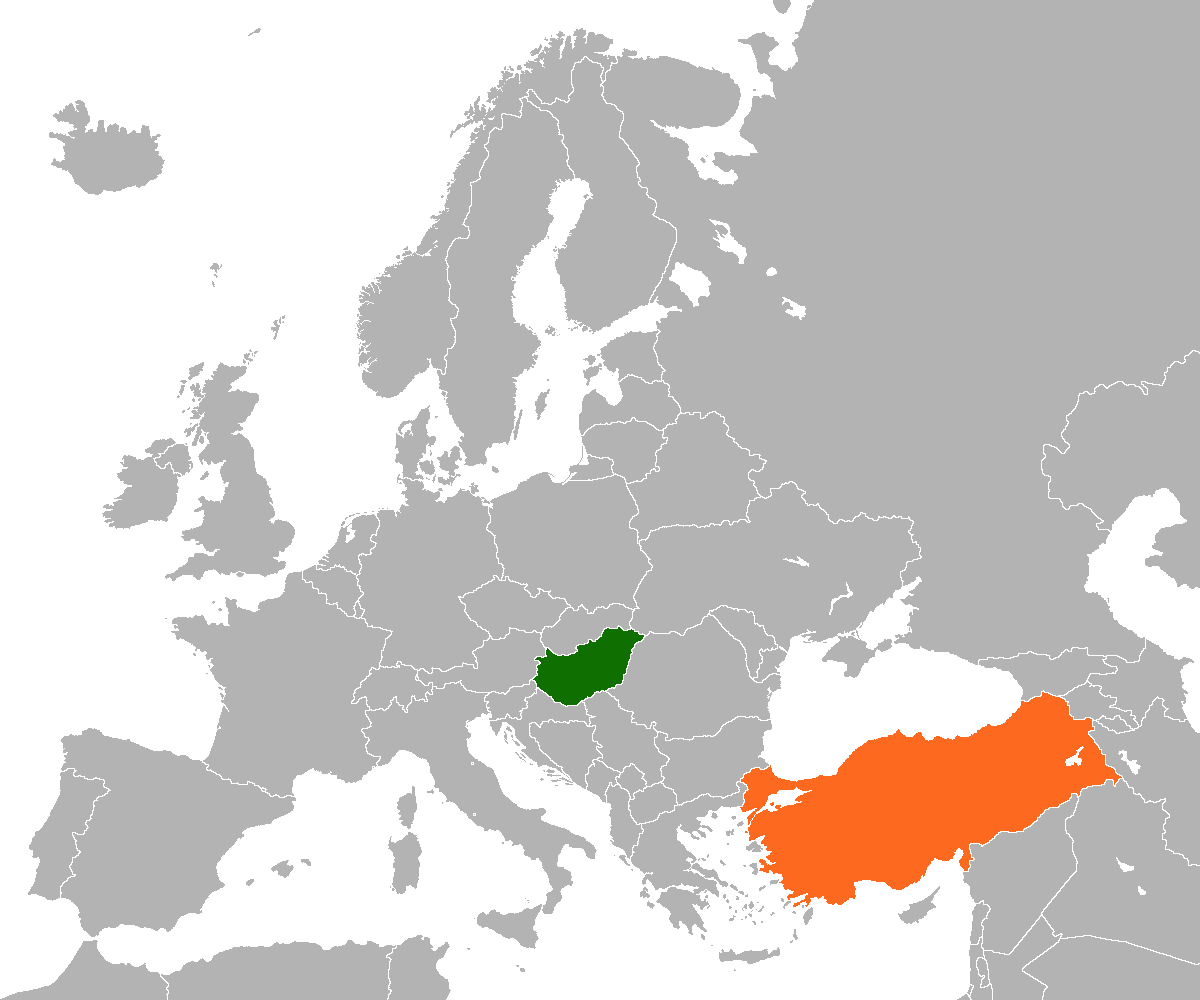

- Hungary: Turkey

Diplomatic mission
- Embassy of Hungary, Ankara: Embassy of Turkey, Budapest

Hungary–Turkey relations (Hungarian: Magyarország-Törökország kapcsolatok; Turkish: Macaristan-Türkiye ilişkileri) are the bilateral relations between Hungary and Turkey. Both countries are full members of the Council of Europe, the OECD, the NATO, the OSCE and the WTO. Also Hungary is an EU member and Turkey is an EU candidate. Hungary supports Turkey's accession negotiations to the EU, although negotiations have now been suspended. Hungary has observer status in the Organization of Turkic States, in which Turkey is a full member.

== History ==
Both Hungarians and Turks migrated westward to their present-day homelands. While the Turks originated in Central Asia, the precise origins of the Hungarians in Asia remains a subject of research, and they are variably considered to have originated in North, Central or East Asia. Linguistically, Hungarians belong to the Ugric group and Turks belong to Turkic group. However, the Hungarian language and culture exhibit a prominent Turkic heritage.

In the 14th century, Hungary was faced with the growing presence of the Ottoman Empire. The first major encounter between the Kingdom of Hungary and the Ottomans was at the Battle of Nicopolis in 1396. The Ottomans successfully invaded Hungary in 1526, and the country was ruled by the Ottoman Empire from 1541 to 1699. Remaining Ottoman-occupied territories in Hungary were ceased in 1718. The Ottoman decline in Europe occurred during the Great Turkish War.

Later on, both Austria-Hungary and the Ottoman Empire were part of the Central Powers during the WWI in the 20th century.

In October 2019, despite the EU's formal position that Turkey should immediately end its operations in northern Syria, Hungarian foreign minister Péter Szijjártó endorsed the Turkish incursion into Syria, adding that the most important thing is to protect Hungarian interests and stop migration. Szijjártó stressed that Hungary would happily work with Turkey if it creates a safe zone in Syria where families who left the country could be resettled.

== Accession of Turkey to the European Union ==
Hungary has supported Turkey's accession to the European Union since the country itself became a member in 2004, a stance that has been maintained by left- and right-wing governments alike.

In 2018, Hungarian prime minister Viktor Orbán claimed that the European Union has been "insincere" with Turkey on its efforts to join the bloc and urged the EU to decide whether it wants a "comprehensive, deep cooperation" with Turkey or not. During the second premiership of Viktor Orbán, Hungary supported Turkey's accession to the European Union.

=== Public opinion ===
According to a Eurobarometer poll in 2005, 51% of the questioned Hungarians was in favour of Turkey's accession to the EU, which was higher than the EU average of 39%. 75% of respondents also declared that Turkey was part of Europe. According to the poll, Turkey's EU accession was not a partisan issue in Hungary and the share of those supporting the accession was the same on the right and left side of the political spectrum.

== Economic relations ==
As of 2018, bilateral trade volume between Turkey and Hungary stood at 2 billion 551 million dollars (Turkish exports: 1 billion 156 million Dollars; Turkish imports: 1 billion 395 million Dollars). Main items of Turkey's exports to Hungary consist of automotive products, machinery, processed products, and food products. Main items of Turkey's imports from Hungary consist of automotive products, machinery, processed products, fuel and cattle.
It has been reported by Turkish authorities that 81 Hungarian companies are operating in Turkey as of June 2018. These companies are mostly centered around trade, tourism, energy, chemistry, glass products and food sectors. The total amount of direct investments of the Hungarian firms in Turkey during 2002-2018 period was recorded as US$29 million. It has also been recorded that the total amount of direct investments of Turkish firms in Hungary during 2002-2018 period was US$58 million. These companies were mainly investing in textile, construction, jewelry and food industries.

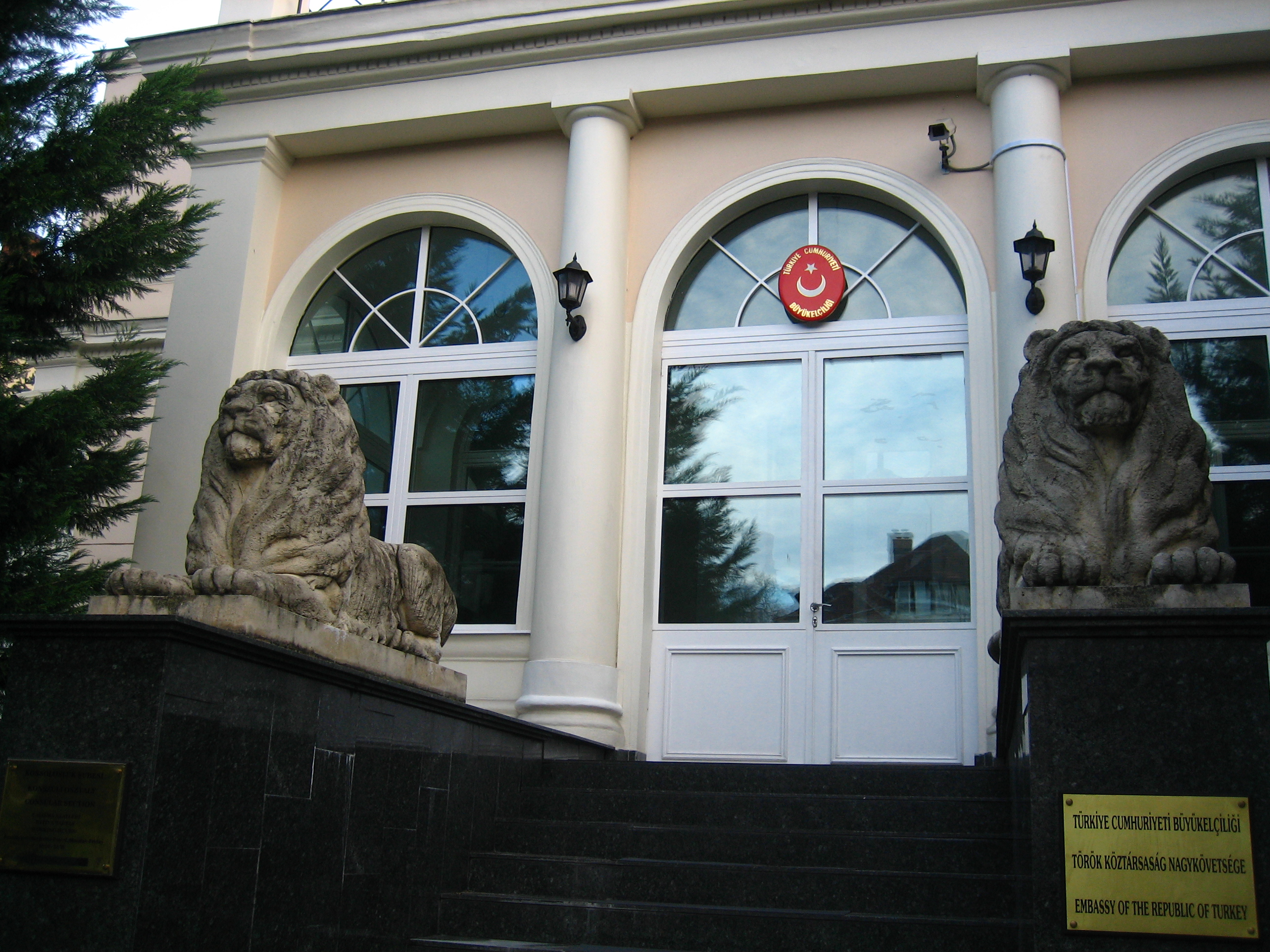
Embassy of Turkey in Budapest

== Resident diplomatic missions ==
- Hungary has an embassy in Ankara and a consulate-general in Istanbul.
- Turkey has an embassy in Budapest.

== See also ==
- Foreign relations of Hungary
- Foreign relations of Turkey
- Hungarians in Turkey
- Turks in Hungary
- Turks in Europe
- Turkey–European Union relations
