= Turks in the Czech Republic =

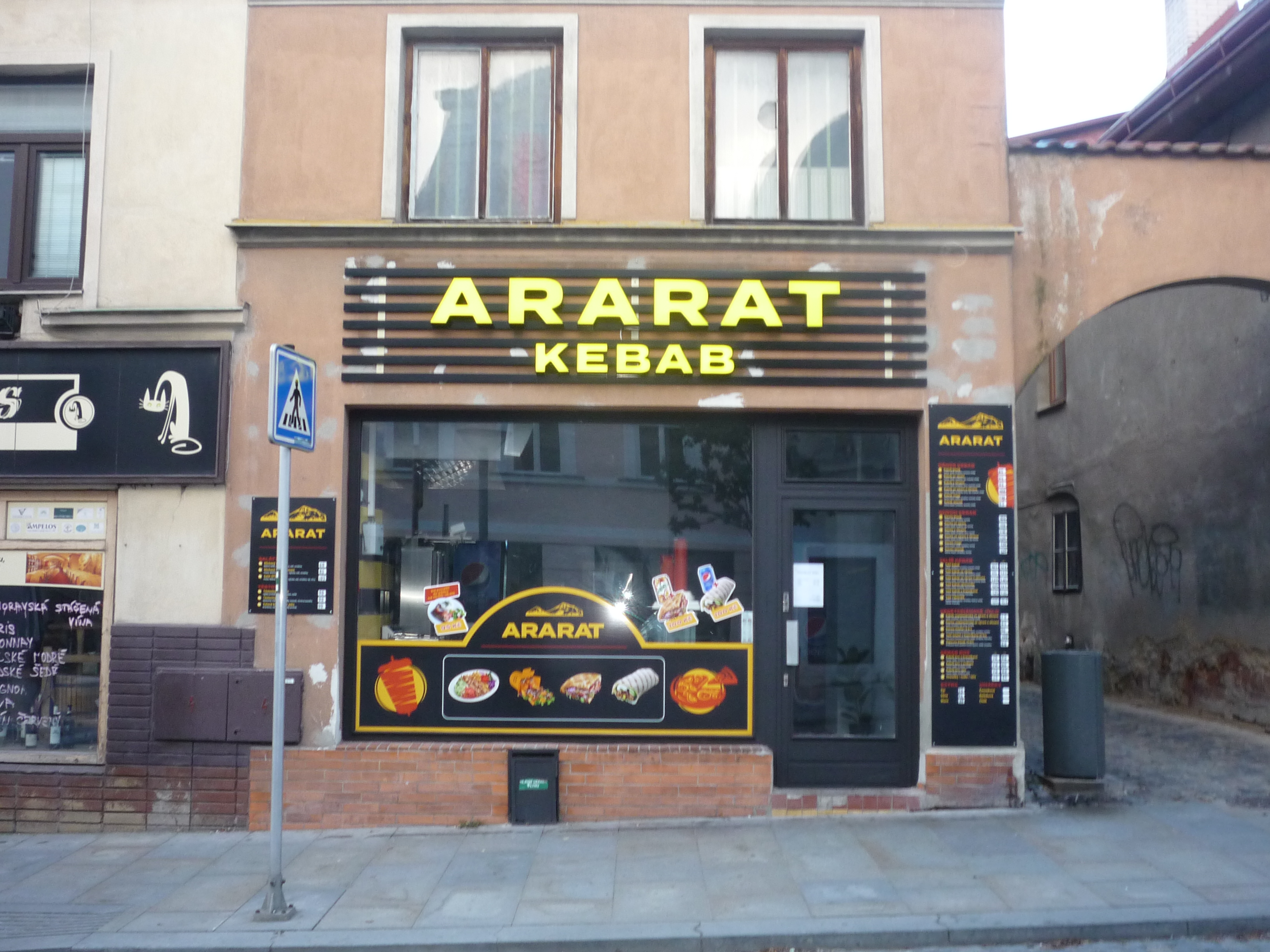
- A kebab shop in Havlíčkův Brod

Total population
- 6,500

Regions with significant populations
- Prague

Languages
- Turkish; Czech

Religion
- Mostly Islam; Minority irreligious

Related ethnic groups
- Turks in Austria; Turks in Germany; Turks in Poland

The Turks in the Czech Republic (Turkish: Çek Cumhuriyeti'ndeki Türkler) refers to ethnic Turkish migrants to the Czech Republic as well as the growing Czech-born community with full or partial Turkish origins. The majority of the Turkish community have come from the Republic of Turkey; however, there has also been ethnic Turkish migration from other post-Ottoman countries, particularly Turkish Macedonians from North Macedonia.

== History ==
Traditionally, the Czech Republic was not the most popular choice of migration for Turkish people who mostly went to neighboring Austria and Germany. By the 2010s, international migration became a relatively new phenomenon for the Czech Republic and it gradually become a destination country due to its positive economic performance and political stability. Consequently, Turks seeking better economic opportunities have been drawn to the country, whilst many have also migrated to undertake their higher education in Czech universities. Turks who have decided to remain permanently in the Czech Republic have also brought their families over which has contributed to the increasing population.

== Culture ==
=== Religion ===
Since the mid-2010s, the Turkish community has increased significantly in the country and they now make up the largest Muslim community in the Czech Republic.

== Areas of settlement ==
The Turkish community have settled mostly in the largest and most diverse urban centers with low unemployment rates.

== Politics ==
In regards to Turkish politics, the Turkish community in the Czech Republic mostly support the main Turkish opposition party, the Republican People's Party, therefore, there is only low support for Recep Tayyip Erdoğan's Justice and Development Party.

== Notable people ==
- Murat Saygıner, digital artist, filmmaker and composer

== See also ==
- Czech Republic–Turkey relations
- Islam in the Czech Republic
- Turks in Europe
  - Turks in Austria
  - Turks in Germany
  - Turks in Poland
