= Murat Saygıner =

Turkish self-taught artist (born 1989)

- Born: February 28, 1989 (age 37); Prague, Czechoslovakia (now the Czech Republic)
- Known for: Filmmaker, director, photographer, digital artist, visual artist, composer

Murat Saygıner (born February 28, 1989) is a Turkish self-taught photographer, digital artist, and is also known as a filmmaker and composer.

== Early life ==
Born in Prague in 1989, Murat Saygıner got involved with photography and digital art in 2007 and won several international awards. In 2008 his works were selected for "IPA Best of Show" exhibition in New York. In 2010 he was awarded Emerging Talent of the Year in "The Photography Gala Awards".

He has written, directed and produced several animated short films since 2013, which were screened in over 200 film festivals including Academy Award Qualifying Festivals such as "Animest" and Athens International Film and Video Festival. Six of his films were also Staff Picked on Vimeo. In 2019 he assembled ten of his short films under the title of The Flying Fish.

== Awards ==
- 2018 Mexico International Film Festival, Mexico
  - Winner of the Golden Palm award in Animation Competition
- 2017 Open World Animation Festival, USA
  - Winner of the award for Best Experimental Film
- 2017 ATF Animated Film Festival, Iran
  - Appreciated Film in Experimental and Newmedia Section
- 2016 5th Hak-İş International Short Film Festival, Turkey
  - Winner of the award for Best Original Score
- 2015 Davis International Film Festival, USA
  - Winner of the award for Best Animation
- PreFoto International Photography Competition 2011
  - Winner of the 1st prize
- Fokus International Competition of Artistic Photography 2011
  - Winner of the 3rd prize
- Pilsner Urquell International Photography Awards 2009
  - 3rd place – Editorial – Personality
  - 3rd place – Fine Art – Collage
- PX3 Prix de la Photographie Paris 2009
  - First Prize – Advertising – Music
  - Third Prize – Fine Art – Digitally Enhanced
- Trierenberg Super Circuit 2009
  - Gold medal – Painted With Light – Special Themes

== Exhibitions ==
- 2018 – "FILE 2018 – Electronic Language International Festival", Fiesp Cultural Center, São Paulo, Brazil
- 2017 – "Celebration of the Arts – Art in Motion", Fort Worth, Texas, United States
- 2014 – "Colors of Life – Young Men with Big Dreams", Pepco Edison Gallery, Washington DC, United States
- 2012 – "6th Arte Laguna Prize Finalist Artists Exhibition", Palazzo Correr, Romanian Cultural Institute, Venice, Italy
- 2012 'Worldwide Photography Biennial Exhibition', The Borges Cultural Center, Buenos Aires, Argentina
- 2011 'PreFoto', Cultural Center "Abdullah Krashnica", Preševo, Serbia
- 2011 'Exposition Focus', Gallery of Art, Fier, Albania
- 2008 'IPA Best of Show', Soho Gallery, New York
