= Vehicle registration plates of Armenia =

Armenia
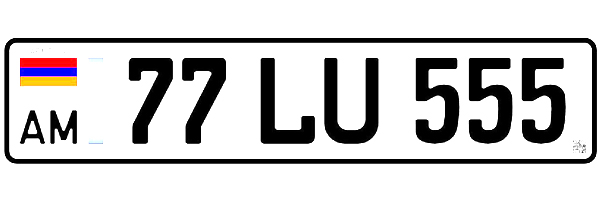
- New Armenian vehicle registration plate
- Country: Armenia
- Country code: AM

Current series
- Size: 520 mm × 110 mm 20.5 in × 4.3 in
- Serial format: NN LL NNN, NNN LL NN
- Colour (front): Black on white
- Colour (rear): Black on white
- Introduced: 2014

Vehicle registration plates of Armenia have black characters on a rectangular white background. They are composed of two or three numbers, two letters (smaller than the digits) in the middle, and two (or three) other numbers. At the left side is located the international code "AM" with an oval car plaque and, sometimes, the national flag. Starting from 6 August 2014 a new design of license plates was implemented. The license plates have a national flag on the left side, a security hologram and a machinery readable Data Matrix Code.

== Overview ==
Formerly, Armenia used to have license plates issued as part of the Soviet Union system. The republic had Cyrillic codes АД and АР. Starting from 1996, after Armenia achieved its independence, the system for the license plates was created. However, motorcycles and trailers were licensed under the former soviet format with the code АР. In 2010, finally, motorcycles and trailers started receiving Armenian format.

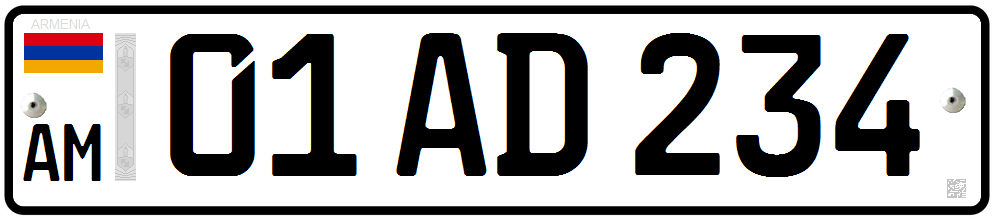

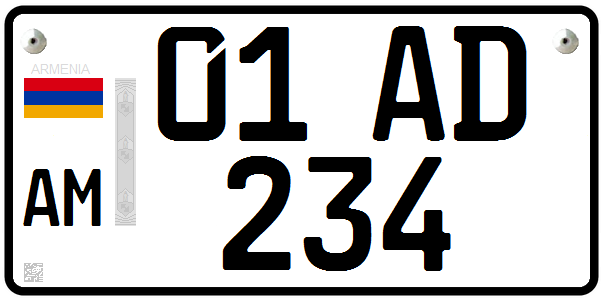

=== Style ===
From the beginning of the issuance of license plates, Armenian plates had the same style as Russia. Same fonts, and same differing font size for letters and digits were used. On the lower left hand side, the code AM was printed. In 2014, the style changed to the one used in Germany. The country's flag was added above AM on the top left hand side. The fonts were changed to FE-Schrift, and the letters and digits now have the same font size. In addition, a silver identifier band has been added on the right side of the flag and code.

=== Letters ===
All 26 Latin letters (A-Z) are currently in use on license plates, introduced gradually over time. This timeline below shows when each was added.

- Originally four letters were used on the plates:
    - Latin letter L, looking similar to Armenian letter Լ, translated as l
    - Armenian letter Ս, translated as s, looking similar to Latin letter U
    - Armenian letter Տ, translated as t, looking similar to Latin letter S
    - Armenian letter Օ, translated as ô, looking similar to Latin letter O
  - The Armenian letter Ո, translated as o, looking similar to lowercase Latin letter n, and the Latin letter P, looking similar to Armenian letter Ք, translated as k were used on special plates.
- Starting from December 2008, the letters Ո and P were being used on all plates.
- From November 2010, the Latin letters D, N, T, and V were allowed to be used, requiring an additional fee, with no Armenian counterpart. At the same time, the letter Ո fell out of disuse for not having a strong enough correlation with the Latin letter n.
- From May 2012, the Latin letters A, M, Q, and R were allowed to be used, requiring an additional fee, with no Armenian counterpart.
- Starting from July 2012, the letters D, N, T, and V, alongside the initial L, Օ, Տ, and Ս, have been used on a general basis.
- From October 2013, the Latin letters C, F, and Z were allowed to be used, requiring an additional fee, with no Armenian counterpart.
- Since the beginning of 2015, the Latin letters G and I have been used, however in the form of G G or I I, and only on vehicle's belonging to the Police or the Prosecutor's office.
- The letter X has been fully implemented since the first half of 2016.
- In 2017, the letters B and H were added.
- In 2018, the letter J was added.
- In 2019, the letters W, Y, K, and E were added.

The standard format for Armenian plates were either NN LL NNN or NNN LL NN, where N is a number and L being a letter.

The NN LL NNN format is meant for private vehicles while the other format is used for government-owned vehicles (such as the police cars). A two-row variation is provided with the first group of numbers and the letter group on the top row, and the remaining numbers on the second. The two-number group is supposedly the regional code.

Production of license plates in the mid-2000s was interrupted due to equipment failure.

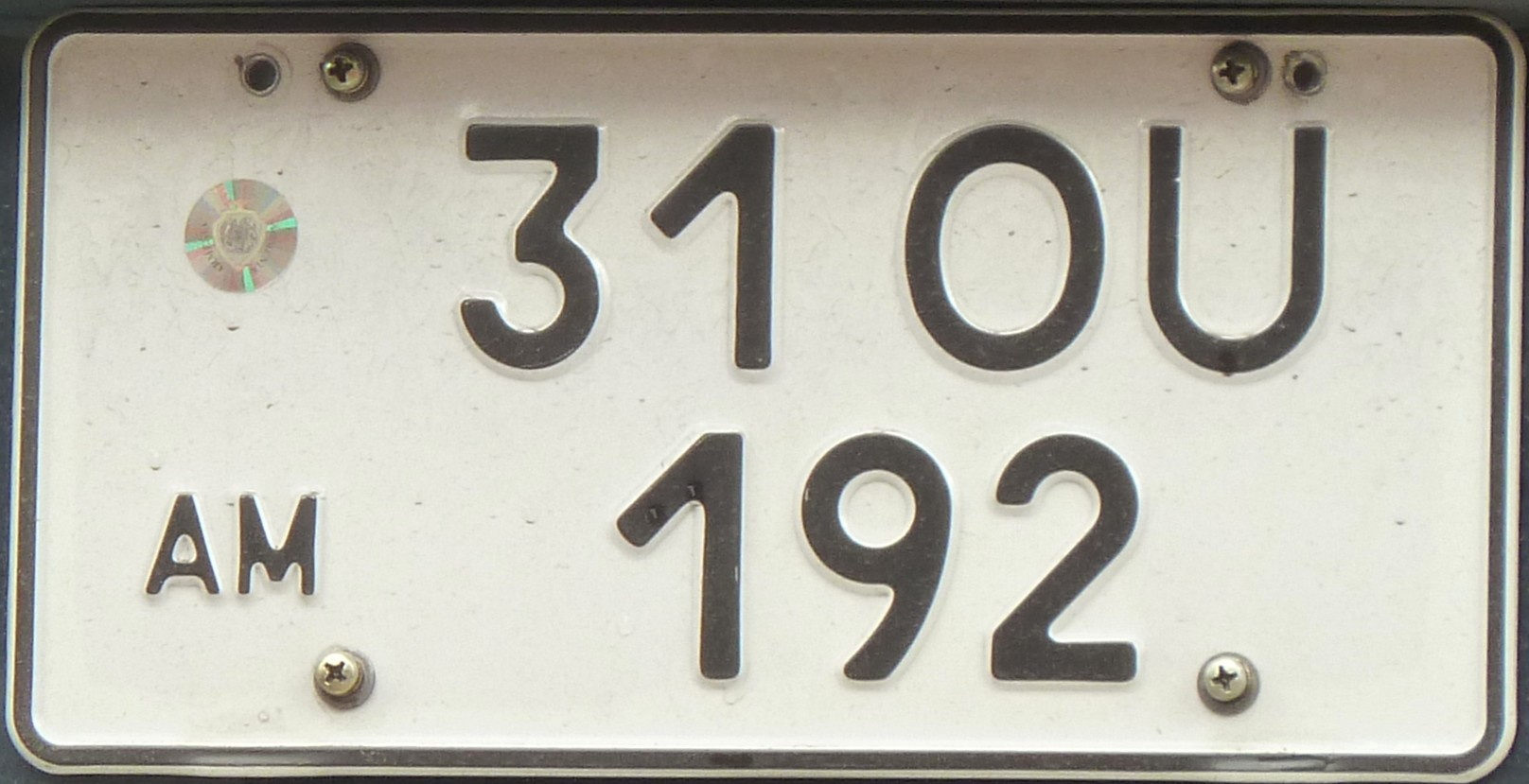
A two-row variant of the license plate

=== Special combinations ===
Public vehicles have the format ### LL ##, where the first three digits are assigned in an increasing order, and the two letters and the last two digits are predefined. The following are the special combinations used on public vehicles.

- Constitutional Court: ### ՕՏ 01
- Presidential Administration: ### ՍՍ 01
- National Assembly: ### ՕՕ 01 to ### ՕՕ 11
- Government: ### FF 01, ### LL 03, ### ՏՏ 03, ### LL 50, ### LL 55, ### LL 60, ### LL 70, ### ՏՏ 60, ### VV 01
- Security Council: ### NN 01
- General Prosecutor's office: ### GG 01
- Police: ### ՈՍ 01 to ### ՈՍ 14, ### II ##
- Banks: ### ՏL 01 to ### ՏL 33
- The Court of Cassation: ### ՏՏ 01
- National Security Service: ### ՏՏ 02

== Regional codes ==
| Area code | Province (Marz) |
|---|---|
| 01 to 11, 13, 19, 61 to 68 | Yerevan (city) |
| 12, 27 to 29 | Armavir Province |
| 14, 45 to 49 | Shirak Province |
| 15, 21 to 24 | Aragatsotn Province |
| 16, 31 to 35 | Gegharkunik Province |
| 17, 42, 43 | Kotayk Province |
| 18, 56 | Vayots Dzor Province |
| 25, 26 | Ararat Province |
| 36 to 39, 41 | Lori Province |
| 51 to 54 | Syunik Province |
| 57 to 59 | Tavush Province |
| ~~22, 90~~ | Republic of Artsakh; De jure part of Republic of Azerbaijan |
| 20, 30, 40, 44, 50, 55, 60, 69 to 99 | Individual plates not showing province |

== Special plates ==
- Motorcycle plates at first is almost essentially a double-row plate with the letter moved to the bottom. But soon after it was determined that this format is too cumbersome to carry, which brings in the compact plate, removing the space between the first group of numbers and the letters, leaving the remainder in the bottom row.
- Trailer plates are similar to double-row plates as well, but the letter count is cut down to 1, and most often the letter L, with more compact dimensions.

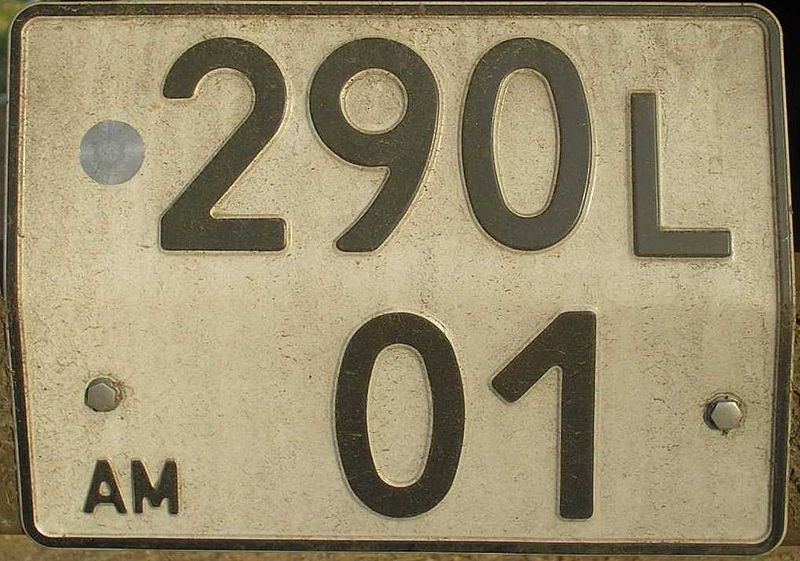
An Armenian trailer plate

- Buses have black-on-yellow plates, similar to the discontinued public transport plate in Russia, in the NNNN L format. The letter S is used for city buses, while long-range coaches use L.
- Armenian diplomatic plate
- Diplomatic plates are white-on-red, with the format NN L NNN LL. The first group of digits stands for the country code, and a letter D after it signifies a diplomat, while a T indicates a technician. The last two letters are always AM, Armenia's international code, while newer plates get the country code of ARM instead.

Armenian UN plate

- UN offices carry white-on-blue plates in the format of UN NNN AM.
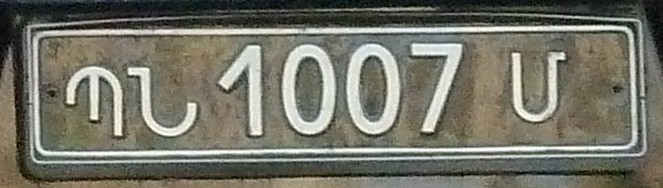
- Military license plate

Military plates don't use Latin letters at all. Ministry of Defense plates have a black background and a format of ՊՆ NNNN L. The ՊՆ stands for Պաշտպանության Նախարարություն, Pashtpanut'yan Naxararut'yun, the Ministry of Defense, while the last letter categorizes the vehicle, where a Մ means a passenger vehicle, and a Տ standing for transport vehicles.

== Artsakh ==
Vehicle registration plates of the Republic of Artsakh (also referred to as the Nagorno-Karabakh Republic) have black characters on a rectangular white background. Current plates are European standard 520 mm × 110 mm, and are composed of two numbers, two letters in the middle, and two or three other numbers. At the left side is located the international code "AM" with an oval car plaque and, sometimes, the national flag of Armenia. Starting from 6 August 2014 a new design of license plates was implemented. The license plates have a flag of Armenia on the left side, a security hologram and a machinery readable Data Matrix Code. In 2014, the style and fonts were changed to FE-Schrift, and the letters and digits now have the same font size. In addition, a silver identifier band has been added on the right side of the flag and code.

Armenian registration plates with region codes 22 and 90 are used in Artsakh (for example, "(AM) 90 SO 123").

| Image | First issued | Design | Slogan | Serial format | Serials issued | Notes |

== See also ==
- List of international vehicle registration codes
- Transport in Armenia
