= Emre Manuila =

Ukrainian footballer

Personal information
- Full name: Emre Nedzhmettinovych Manuila
- Date of birth: 20 September 2004 (age 22)
- Place of birth: Istanbul, Turkey
- Height: 1.78 m (5 ft 10 in)
- Position: Right back

Team information
- Current team: Bukovyna Chernivtsi
- Number: 5

Youth career
- 2016–2020: Bukovyna Chernivtsi

Senior career*
Years	Team	Apps	(Gls)
2020	Lukovytsya (amateurs)	0	(0)
2020–2022	Bukovyna Chernivtsi	15	(0)
2023–	Bukovyna Chernivtsi	4	(0)
- * Club domestic league appearances and goals as of 25 September 2023

Emre Nedzhmettinovych Manuila (Ukrainian: Емре Неджметтінович Мануіла; born 20 September 2004) is a Ukrainian professional footballer who plays as a right-back for Bukovyna Chernivtsi.
