= Turks in Poland =

Ethnic group in Poland

Total population
- 25,000 (2023 estimate from the Turkish government)

Regions with significant populations
- Warsaw; Poznań; Gdańsk; Łódź

Languages
- Turkish; Polish

Religion
- Sunni Islam; Irreligion; Roman Catholicism

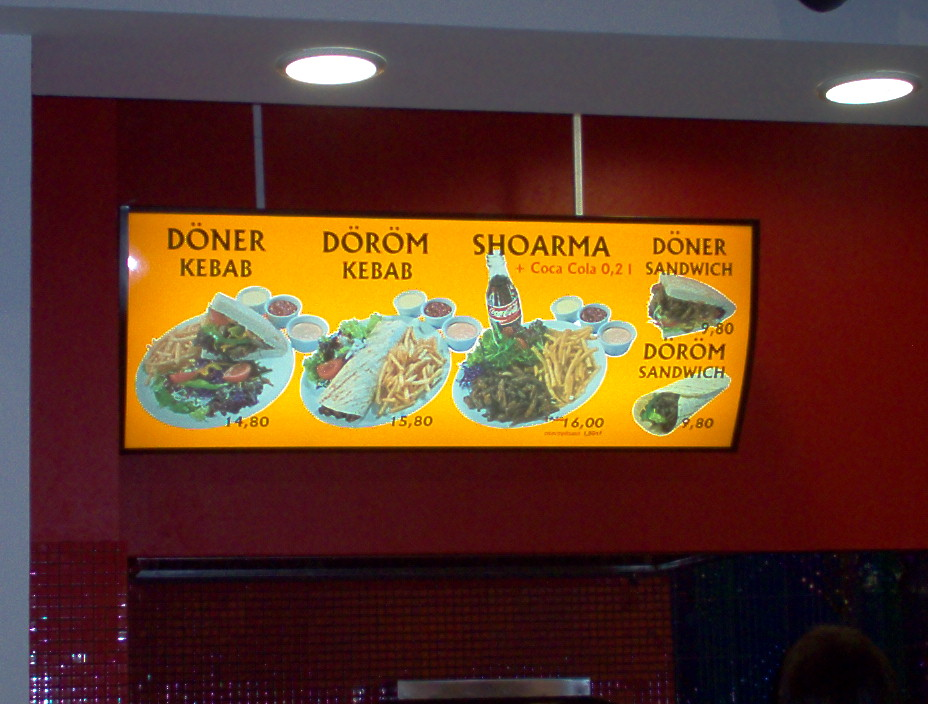
A Turkish Kebab shop in Łódź

Turks in Poland (Turkish: Polonya'daki Türkler) are people of Turkish ethnicity living in Poland who form one of the country's smaller minority groups.

== History ==
Very few Turks lived in Poland in the interwar period according to the 1921 Polish census, including three in Lwów, two in Warsaw and one each in Chełm and Grodno.

== Demographics ==
There is little coherent statistical data regarding their numbers. The majority of these Turks live in Warsaw and Łódź but there are also Turkish communities in Gdańsk, Poznań, Kraków, and Wrocław, and students in cities like Lublin or Krosno.

Many Turks in Poland are entrepreneurs and investors.

=== Naturalization ===
Naturalization of Turkish citizens:
Year	1998	1999	2000	2001	2002	2003	2004	2005	2006
Persons	8	8	4	15	1	5	11	19	36

== Notable people ==
- Feridun Erol, film director and screenwriter (Turkish father)
- Jakub Erol, graphic artist (Turkish father)
- Maria Aurora of Spiegel, Ottoman Turkish mistress of Augustus II the Strong
  - children:
  - Frederick Augustus Rutowsky, commanded Saxon forces in the Siege of Pirna
  - Maria Anna Katharina Rutowska, noblewoman
- Teuvo Tulio, film director (Turkish-Polish father)
- Marcel Łubik, professional footballer

== Bibliography ==
- Koryś, Izabela; Żuchaj, Olimpia (2000), Turkish Migratory Flows To Poland: General Description, Institute for Social Studies University of Warsaw.
- Organisation for Economic Co-operation and Development (2008), International Migration Outlook: SOPEMI 2008, OECD Publishing, ISBN 978-92-64-04565-1.
- United Nations Human Settlements Programme (2004), The State of The World's Cities 2004/2005: Globalization and Urban Culture, Earthscan, ISBN 1-84407-160-X.

== See also ==
- Poland–Turkey relations
- Józef Bem, Ottoman pasha and a national hero of Poland and Hungary
- Turks in Europe
  - Turks in the Czech Republic
  - Turks in Germany
  - Turks in Russia
  - Turks in Ukraine
