= Sultan Suleiman Mosque =

Mosque in Mariupol, Ukraine

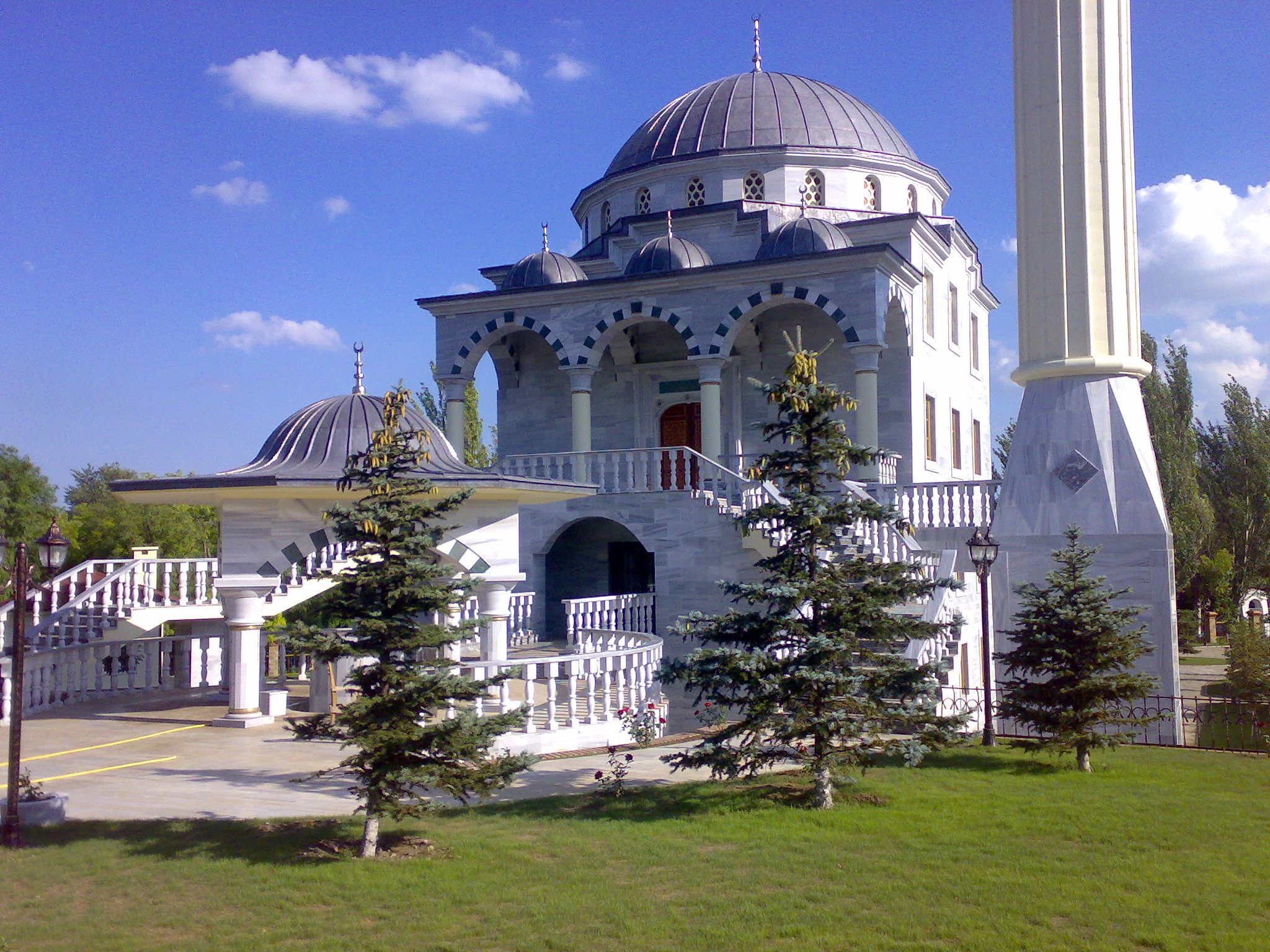

Religion
- Affiliation: Islam
- District: Donetsk Oblast
- Status: Currently inactive

Location
- Location: Mariupol
- Interactive map of Sultan Suleiman Mosque
- Territory: Ukraine
- Coordinates: 47°04′38.23″N 37°31′08.6″E

Architecture
- Type: mosque
- Style: Ottoman
- Completed: October 15, 2007

Specifications
- Dome: 4
- Minaret: 1

The Sultan Suleiman and Roxolana Mosque, (Ukrainian: Мечеть султана Сулеймана та Роксолани; Russian: Мариупольская мечеть в честь султана Сулеймана Великолепного и Роксоланы, romanized: Mariupolskaya mechet v chest sultana Suleymana Velikolepnogo i Roksolany) is located in Mariupol, Donetsk Oblast, Ukraine. The mosque is named in honor of Suleiman the Magnificent and Roxelana.

== History ==
The Sultan Suleiman Mosque and Islamic Cultural Center opened October 15, 2007. The architecture of the mosque was styled after the Süleymaniye Mosque in Istanbul. The mosque was financed by Turkish businessman Salih Cihan, who was born in Trabzon.

== 2022 Russian invasion of Ukraine ==
The mosque, which had been sheltering 80 civilians including Turkish citizens, was hit by Russian shelling on 12 March according to the Ukrainian Foreign Ministry. However the attack was denied by İsmail Hacıoğlu, head of the Suleiman the Magnificent Mosque Association, saying that the bombing was about 700 metres away.

== Photos ==
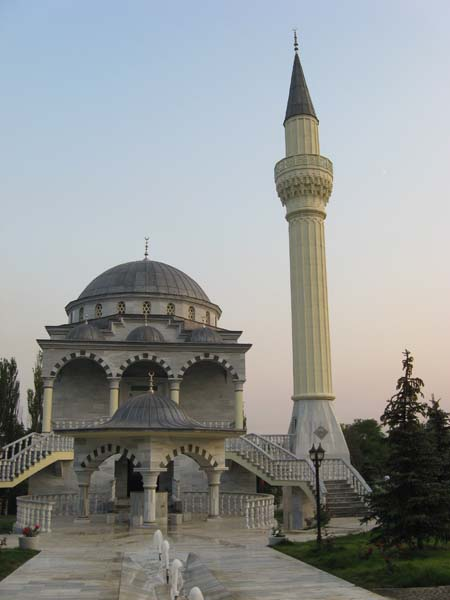
The mosque in 2007

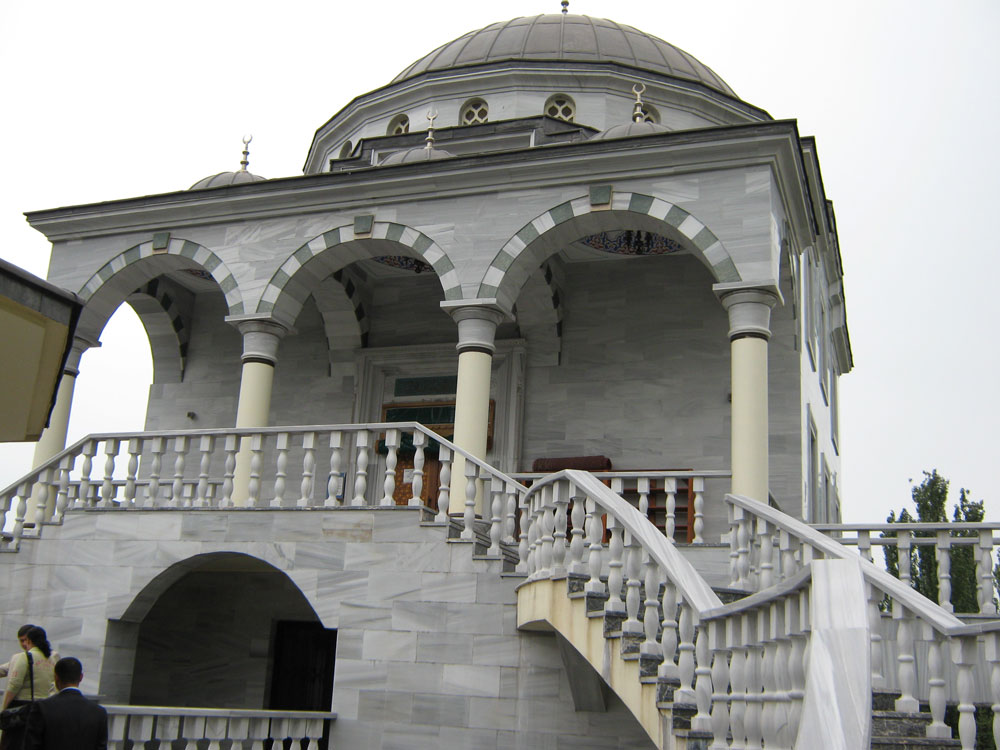
Facade

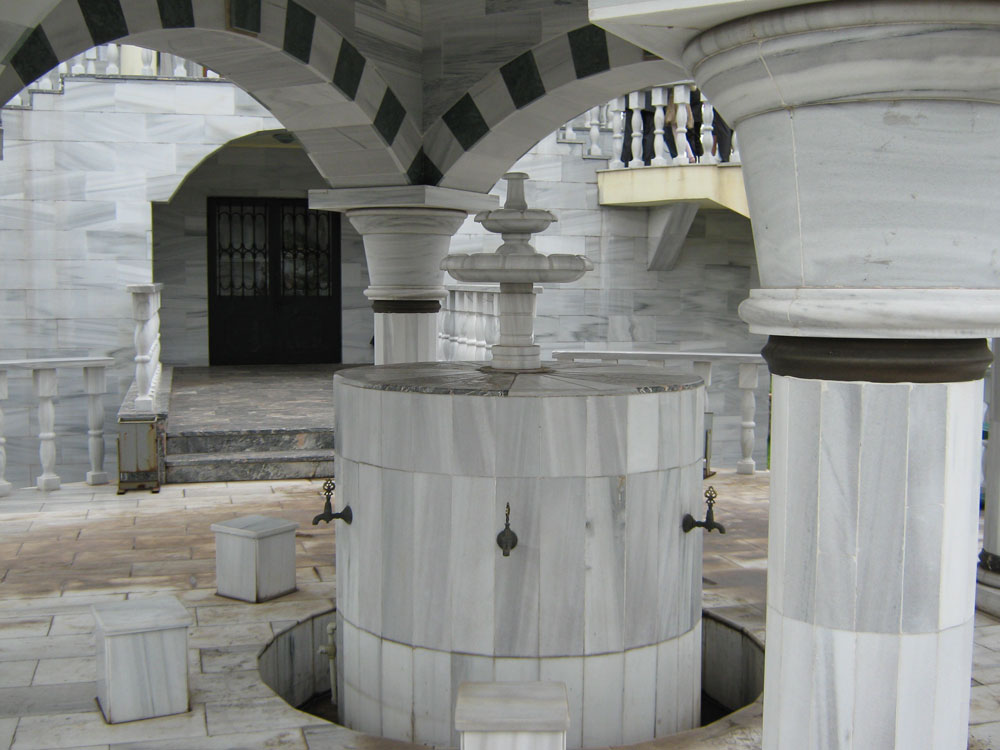
Fountain (shadirvan)

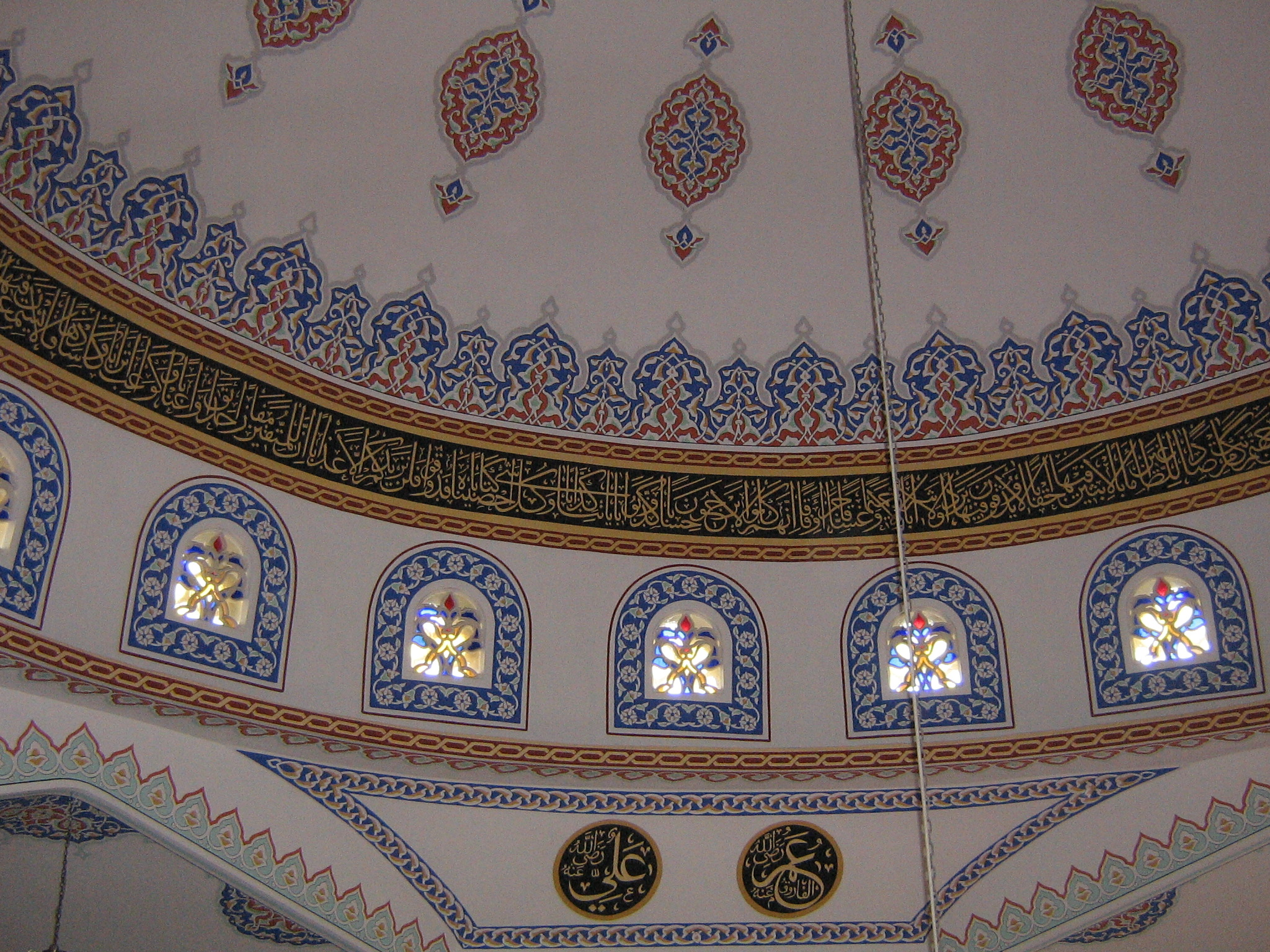
Dome

== See also ==
- Islam in Ukraine
