= Turkish New Zealanders =

People

Turkish New Zealanders Yeni Zelanda'daki Türkler
Total population
- 957 (2013 census) Total: at least 3,600-4,600, including: Turkish-New Zealanders from Turkey: est.2,000-3,000 Turkish-New Zealanders from Cyprus: est.1,600 plus smaller Turkish communities from Iraq and Syria

Regions with significant populations
- Wellington · Dunedin · Christchurch · Auckland

Languages
- New Zealand English, Turkish

Religion
- Predominantly Sunni Islam; Minority Alevism, other religions, and irreligion

Related ethnic groups
- Turkish diaspora, Turkish Australians

Turkish New Zealanders (Turkish: Türk Yeni Zelandalılar) or New Zealand Turks (Turkish: Yeni Zelandalı Türkler) are Turkish people who are New Zealand citizens, residents of New Zealand, or people who are of Turkish descent. Most have come to New Zealand from Turkey and the island of Cyprus.

Turkish people are mostly established their own businesses specialising in traditional Turkish food, such as kebab, baklava, and Turkish delight.

== Demographics ==
=== Population ===
According to the 2013 census, the Turkish ethnic group accounted for 957 residents, which was a 49.5% increase from the 2006 census. This was a greater percentage increase than the 47.6% increase between the 2001 and 2006 censuses.

=== Areas of settlement ===
The majority of Turkish New Zealanders live in urban areas, mostly in the North Island (80.6%) and the remainder live in the South Island (19.4%).

The Turkish community mostly live in the Auckland Region (mostly in the Waitematā Local Board, the Devonport-Takapuna Local Board, and the Orakei Local Board), followed by the Wellington Region, and the Otago Region.

== Notable people ==
- Erkin Bairam, economist at the University of Otago

== See also ==
- Turkish Australians
- New Zealand–Turkey relations
- Turkish diaspora
- Asian New Zealanders
- European New Zealanders
