= Turkish diaspora in Venezuela =

Venezuelan people of Turkish descent

Turkish diaspora in Venezuela Venezuela Türkleri La diáspora turca en Venezuela
Total population
- 27,000 (0.3% of the Venezuelan population)

Regions with significant populations
- Caracas, Valencia, Maracay, Puerto La Cruz.

Languages
- Spanish (Venezuelan Spanish); Turkish

Religion
- Islam, Christianity

Related ethnic groups
- Turkish diaspora, Turkish Brazilians, Turkish Americans, Turkish Canadians

The Turkish diaspora in Venezuela (Turkish: Venezuela Türkleri) is made of Turkish people who have immigrated to Venezuela as well as Venezuelan-born persons who have Turkish parents or who have a Turkish ancestral background. The Turkish community is largely made up of immigrants, or the descendants of immigrants, born in the Ottoman Empire before 1923, in the Republic of Turkey since then, or in neighbouring countries once part of the Ottoman Empire that still have some Turkish population. An estimated 27,000 Turkish Venezuelan people live in the country.

== See also ==
- Turkey–Venezuela relations
- Turkish diaspora
- Immigration to Venezuela

== Sources ==
- Karpat, Kemal H. (2004). "The Turks in America: Historical Background: From Ottoman to Turkish Immigration". Studies on Turkish Politics and Society: Selected Articles and Essays. BRILL. ISBN 90-04-13322-4.
- Powell, John (2005). "Turkish Immigration". Encyclopedia of North American Immigration. Infobase Publishing. ISBN 0-8160-4658-1.
