= Turkey–Venezuela relations =

- Turkey: Venezuela

Diplomatic mission
- Turkish embassy, Caracas: Venezuelan embassy, Ankara

Diplomatic relations between Turkey and Venezuela were established in 1950. They have had cordial relations since, especially since 2016. Turkey backed Nicolás Maduro as the president of Venezuela instead of his political opponent Juan Guaidó during the Venezuelan presidential crisis.

== History ==
Due to the geographical distance and the fact that the two countries focused more on their own geography, relations stayed limited until 2016 and onwards. Following the death of Hugo Chávez in March 2013, Turkish Deputy PM Beşir Atalay attended the funeral and said that the death of the late Venezuelan President shook across Latin America. The visit to Venezuela by Deputy PM Atalay was marked as highly important for its future relations with Venezuela.

Following the increasing economic partnership between Venezuela and Turkey in October 2016, Turkish Airlines started offering direct flights from December 2016 connecting between Caracas to Istanbul (via Havana, Cuba) in an effort to "link and expand contacts" between the two countries.

The relations have started to develop with recent developments and high level mutual visits. The first official visit between the two countries at presidential level was in October 2017 when Venezuelan President Nicolás Maduro visited Turkey. In December 2018, Turkish President Recep Tayyip Erdoğan visited Venezuela and did not support the claim of Juan Guaidó a month later.

Reuters reported that in 2018, 23 tons of mined gold were taken from Venezuela to Istanbul. In the first nine months of 2018, Venezuela's gold exports to Turkey rose from zero in the previous year to US$900 million.

Following the 2019 Venezuelan uprising attempt, Erdoğan condemned the actions of Guaidó, tweeting "Those who are in an effort to appoint a postmodern colonial governor to Venezuela, where the President was appointed by elections and where the people rule, should know that only democratic elections can determine how a country is governed".

In 2020, Venezuela's foreign minister, Jorge Arreaza, said that the two countries always have had good relations. He also said that Maduro had been one of the earliest to denounce the 2016 Turkish coup d'état attempt which Arreaza claimed were carried out by the Gülen movement. According to him it was after this incident that the relations between Turkey and Venezuela peaked but that it wasn't at the preferred stages so far. He however expressed belief that their economies could harmonize with one another and blamed sanctions for turks not investing in Venezuela.

Turkey and Venezuela have developed good relations in recent years. In November 2021, Turkey praised Venezuela for its recent controversial regional elections, although the US State Department called Venezuela's elections "flawed" According to a Wilson Center report on the relationship between Turkey and Venezuela, Erdoğan has drawn close to Maduro "based on the two leaders' mutual dislike of the West and frustration with U.S. sanctions... Despite their ideological differences—Maduro espouses a far-left ideology, while Erdoğan has an Islamist vision—the two leaders seem to have developed strong personal ties." However both Chavismo and Erdoğanism are considered to be Third Way ideologies.

Following the capture of Maduro in 2026, the government of the Republic of Türkiye said it was monitoring the situation in Venezuela, and urged restraint and called on all parties maintain order for the sake of regional and international security and safety. The Turkish Foreign Ministry stated that Ankara is "closely" following recent developments in Venezuela.

== Diplomacy ==
Republic of Turkey

- Caracas (Embassy)

Bolivarian Republic of Venezuela

- Ankara (Embassy)
- Istanbul (Consulate–General)

=== Embassy of Turkey in Caracas ===
The Embassy of Turkey in Caracas (Turkish: Türkiye'nin Karakas Büyükelçiliği) is the diplomatic mission of Turkey to Venezuela. Şevki Mütevellioğlu has been the ambassador since 2018. The embassy also hosts the office of Ministry of Trade Attaché. The inaugural ambassador was Taha Carım. The embassy is located on: Calle Kemal Atatürk No: 6 Quinta Turquesa, Valle Arriba, 1061.

The Türkiye Embassy started its mission in 1957 and moved in 1968 to the building currently used as the Official Residence, which was purchased during the period of Minister İhsan Sabri Çağlayangil. The building used today as the Embassy was built between 1993 and 1996 within the grounds of the Official Residence and began to serve since 1996. The Embassy works in the Valle Arriba urbanization in Caracas, where other embassies are located.

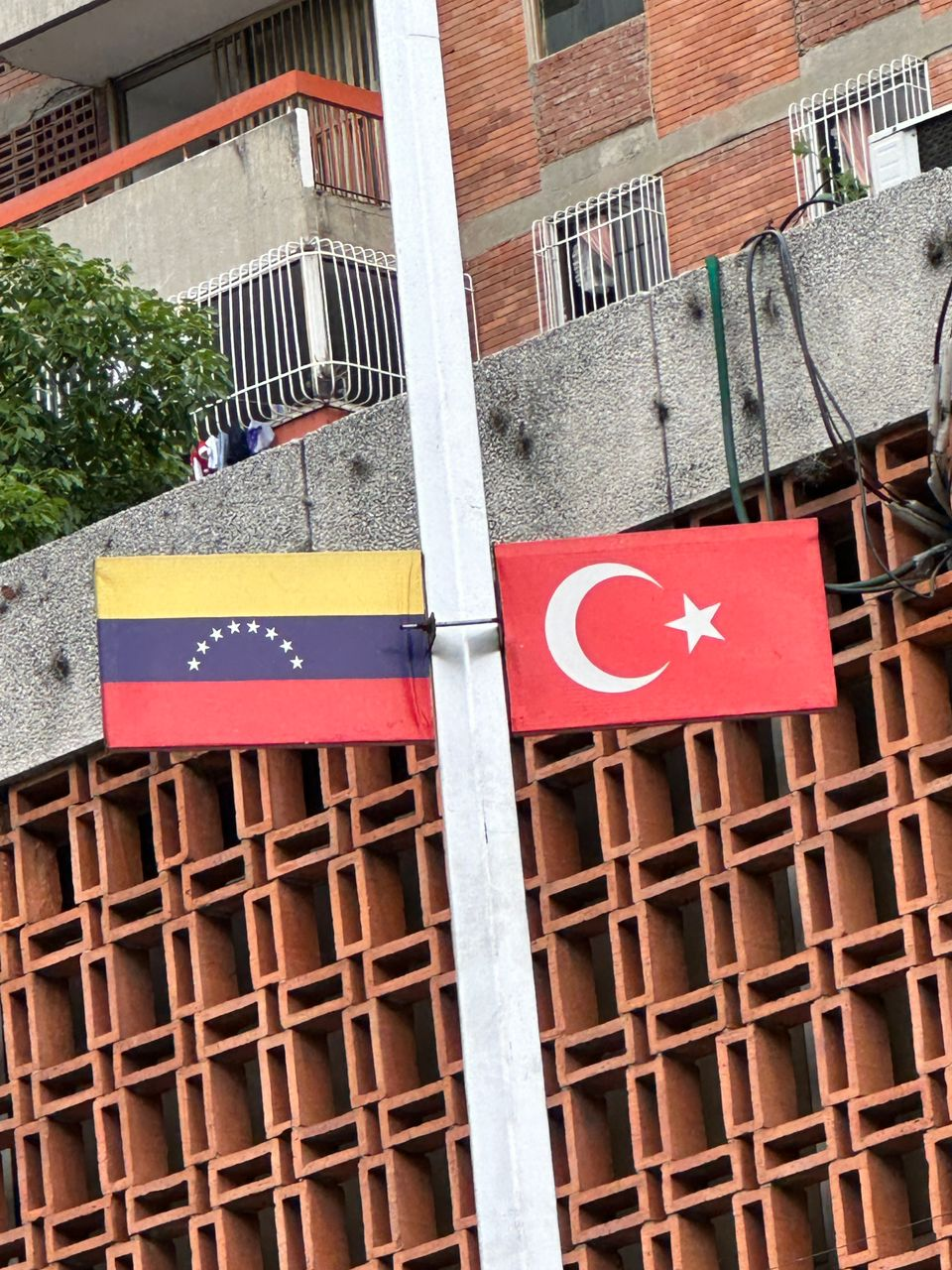
The flags of Turkey and Venezuela in Caracas

== Presidential visits ==
Guest	Host	Place of visit	Date of visit
(Venezuela) President Nicolás Maduro	(Turkey) President Recep Tayyip Erdoğan	World Energy Congress, Istanbul	October 9–13, 2016
(Venezuela) President Nicolás Maduro	(Turkey) President Recep Tayyip Erdoğan	Çankaya Köşkü, Ankara	October 5–6, 2017
(Venezuela) President Nicolás Maduro	(Turkey) President Recep Tayyip Erdoğan	Çankaya Köşkü, Ankara	December 13, 2017
(Turkey) President Recep Tayyip Erdoğan	(Venezuela) President Nicolás Maduro	Palacio de Miraflores, Caracas	December 3, 2018
(Venezuela) President Nicolás Maduro	(Turkey) President Recep Tayyip Erdoğan	Presidential complex, Ankara	June 8–10, 2022

== See also ==
- Foreign relations of Turkey
- Foreign relations of Venezuela
- Turks in Venezuela
