= Turkish diaspora =

Communities of Turks outside Turkey

- Map of the Turkish people around the world

Total population
- Over 7 million (2020)

Languages
- Turkish language

Religion
- Mostly Islam, minority irreligion and other religions

The Turkish diaspora (Turkish: Türk diasporası or Türk gurbetçiler) refers to ethnic Turkish people who have migrated from, or are the descendants of migrants from, the Republic of Turkey, Northern Cyprus or other modern nation-states that were once part of the former Ottoman Empire. Therefore, the Turkish diaspora is not only formed by people with roots from mainland Anatolia and Eastern Thrace (i.e. the modern Turkish borders); rather, it is also formed of Turkish communities which have also left traditional areas of Turkish settlements in the Balkans (such as Bulgaria, Greece, North Macedonia, Romania, etc.), the island of Cyprus, the region of Meskhetia in Georgia, and the Arab world (such as Algeria, Iraq, Lebanon).

In particular, most mainland Turkish migration has been to Western and Northern Europe. Meanwhile, almost all the Turkish minorities in former Ottoman lands have a large diaspora in Turkey, many having migrated as muhacirs (refugees); furthermore, the Cretan Turks have migrated throughout the Levant; Cypriot Turks have a significant diaspora in the English-speaking countries (especially the UK and Australia); the Meskhetian Turks have a large diaspora in Central Asia; and Algerian Turks and Tunisian Turks have mostly settled in France. Since Bulgarian Turks and Romanian Turks gained EU citizenship in 2007, their diasporas in Western Europe significantly increased once restrictions on movement came to a halt in 2012.

== Europe ==
As early as 1997 Professor Servet Bayram and Professor Barbara Seels said that there was 10 million Turks living in Western Europe and the Balkans (i.e. excluding Cyprus and Turkey). By 2010, Boris Kharkovsky from the Center for Ethnic and Political Science Studies said that there was up to 15 million Turks living in the European Union. According to Dr Araks Pashayan 10 million "Euro-Turks" alone were living in Germany, France, the Netherlands and Belgium in 2012. Furthermore, there are significant Turkish communities living in Austria, the UK, Switzerland, Italy, Liechtenstein and the Scandinavian countries. Meanwhile, approximately 400,000 Meskhetian Turks live in Europe .

In addition to the modern Turkish diaspora in Europe, there are also traditional Turkish communities in post-Ottoman nation-states. For example, Turkish Cypriots and Turkish settlers living in North Cyprus number around 300,000 to 500,000. In addition, in Southeastern Europe there is over 1 million Turks living in the Balkan countries (i.e. Bosnia and Herzegovina, Bulgaria, Croatia, Greece, Kosovo, Montenegro, North Macedonia, Romania and Serbia). Since the 20th century, these ethnic Turkish communities have also migrated to Western Europe and have enlarged the Turkish diaspora significantly (e.g. Algerian Turks have mostly settled in France; Bulgarian Turks have migrated mostly to Germany, the Netherlands, and Sweden; Turkish Cypriots have a large population in the UK; Macedonian Turks have migrated mostly to Sweden; Tunisian Turks have migrated mostly to France and Italy; and Western Thrace Turks have mostly migrated to Germany and the Netherlands). More recently, since the "European migrant crisis" (2014–20), Iraqi Turks, Kosovo Turks and Syrian Turks have also settled in areas where there are large Turkish diasporas.

Consequently, within the diaspora, ethnic Turkish people now form the largest minority group in Austria, Denmark, Germany and the Netherlands.

In March 2017, Turkish President Recep Tayyip Erdoğan stated to the Turks in Europe, "Make not three, but five children. Because you are the future of Europe. That will be the best response to the injustices against you." This has been interpreted as an imperialist call for demographic warfare.

According to The Economist, Erdoğan is the first Turkish leader to take the Turkish diaspora seriously, which has created friction within these diaspora communities and between the Turkish government and several of its European counterparts.

=== Germany ===
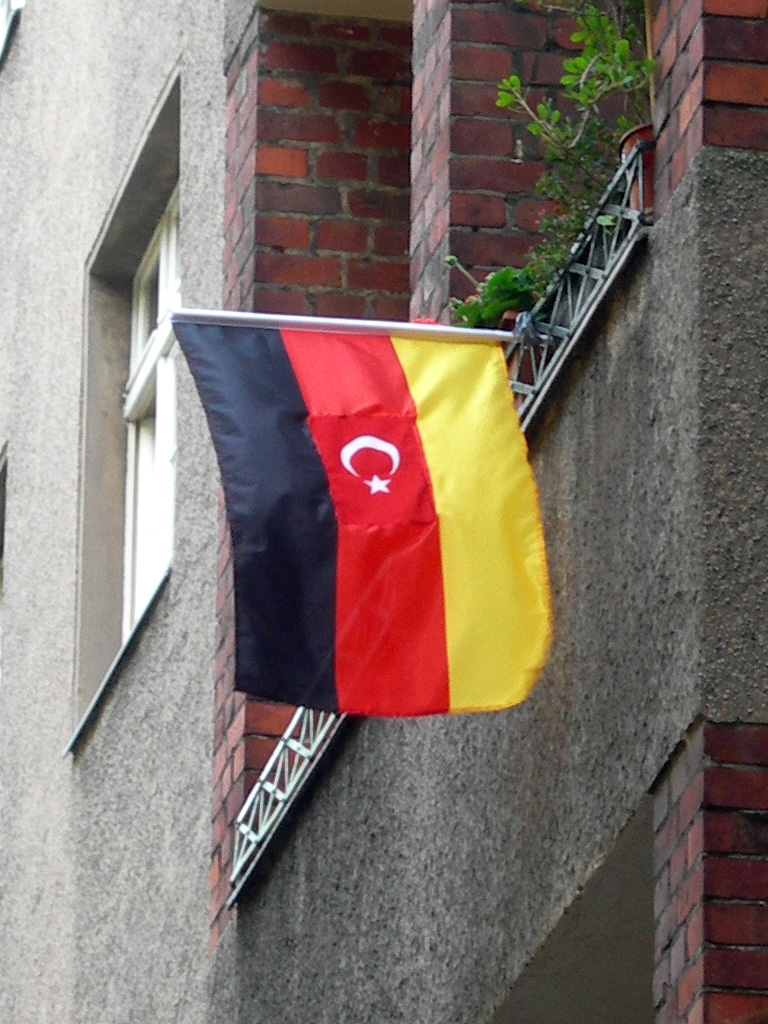
A popularized German-Turkish community flag.

The Turkish-Germans are the largest ethnic minority group in Germany and also the largest Turkish community in the Turkish diaspora.

The German census counts around three million Turks living in Germany. This does not only count those born in Turkey, but also descendants. The majority of ethnic Turks living in Germany have either arrived from or originate from Turkey; however, there are also significant ethnic Turkish communities which have come from (or descend from) other post-Ottoman nation-states in the Balkans (especially from Bulgaria and Greece), as well as from the island of Cyprus, and Lebanon. More recently, since the European migrant crisis (2014–19), there has also been a significant increase in the number of ethnic Turks from Syria, Iraq and Kosovo who have come to Germany.

The German state does not allow citizens to self-declare their identity; consequently, the statistics published in the official German census does not show data on ethnicity. According to the 2023 estimation, roughly 3 million German residents had a "migration background" from Turkey.

=== France ===
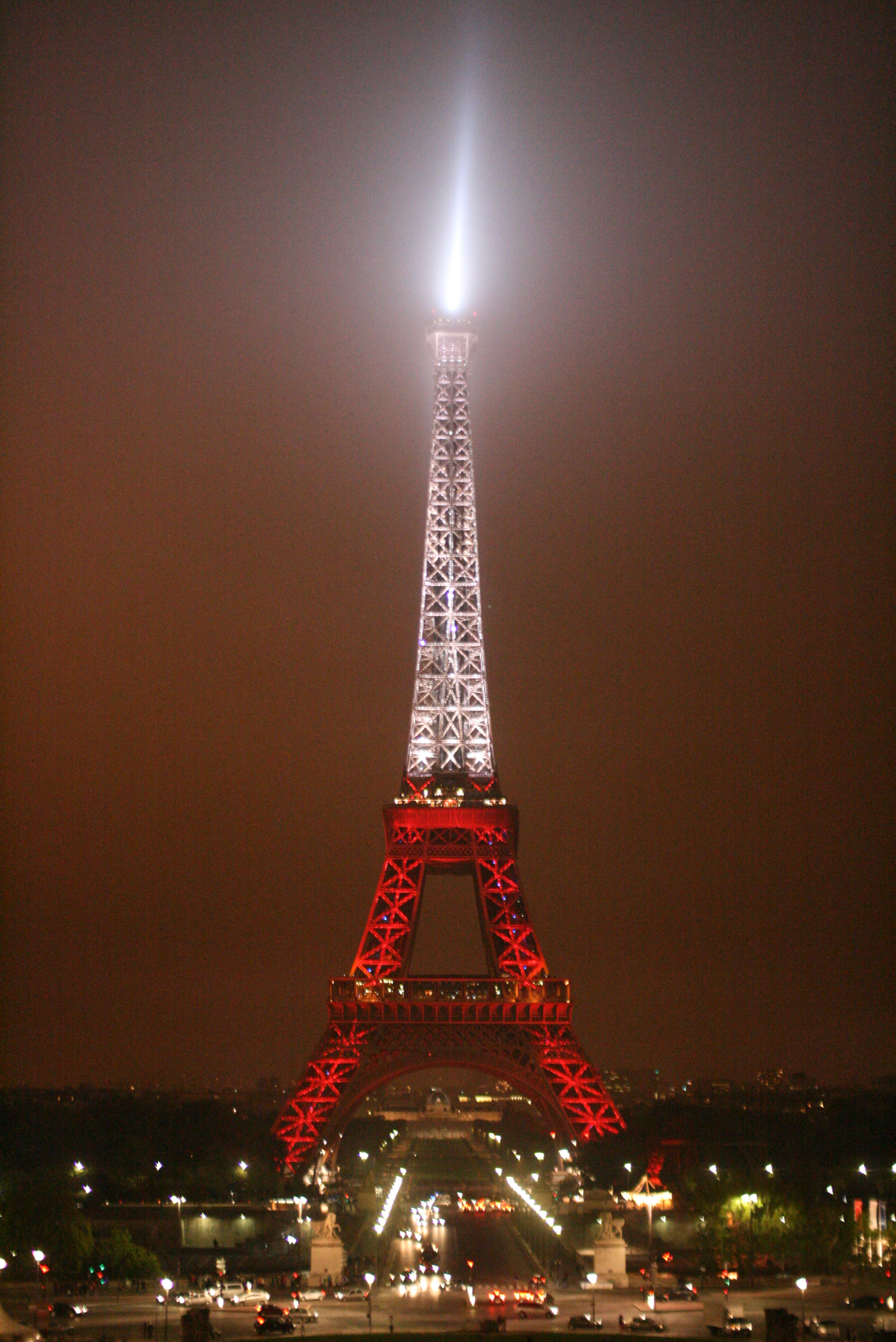
The Eiffel Tower in the colours of the Turkish flag during the Saison de la Turquie en France

There are around one million people of Turkish origin living in France.

The Turks living in France form one of the largest Turkish communities in Western Europe. Official data on the total number of French Turks is not available because the French census only records statistics on the country of birth rather than one's ethnic affiliation.

Although the majority of French Turks are descend from people from the Republic of Turkey, there has also been significant Turkish migration from other post-Ottoman countries including ethnic Turkish communities which have come to France from North Africa (especially Algeria and Tunisia), the Balkans (e.g. from Bulgaria, Greece, Kosovo, North Macedonia and Romania), the island of Cyprus, and more recently from Iraq, Lebanon, and Syria.

In 2014 Professor Pierre Vermeren reported in L'Express that the Turkish population was around 800,000. However, an earlier academic publication in 2010 by Dr Jean-Gustave Hentz and Dr Michel Hasselmann said that there were already 1 million Turks living in France. Professor İzzet Er, as well as the French-Armenian politician Garo Yalic (who is an advisor to Valerie Boyer), also said that there were 1,000,000 Turks in France in 2011 and 2012 respectively. More recently, the Turkish-French population has been estimated to be more than one million according to French-published articles in Le Petit Journal (2019) and Marianne (2020).

=== The Netherlands ===
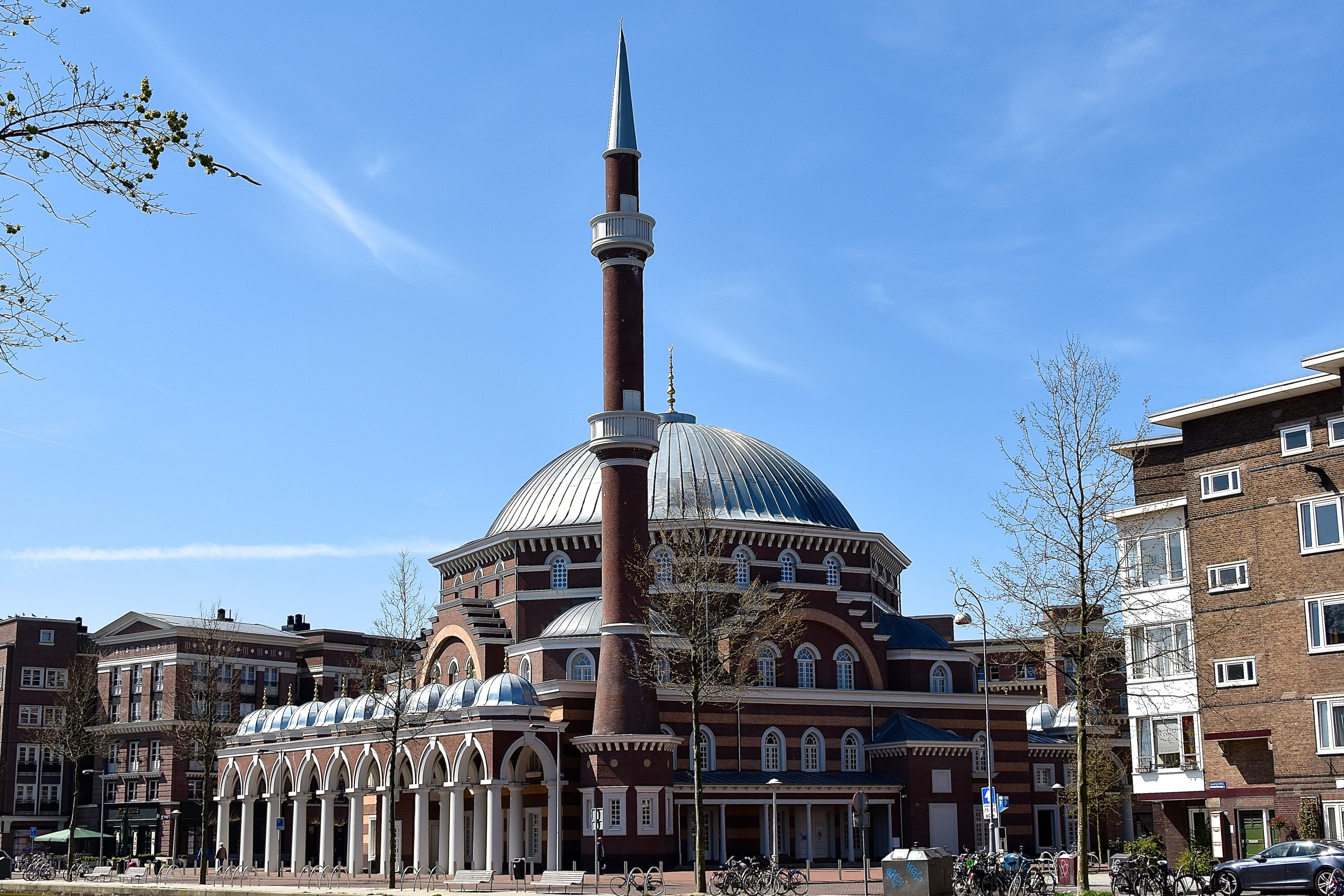
Westermoskee in Amsterdam

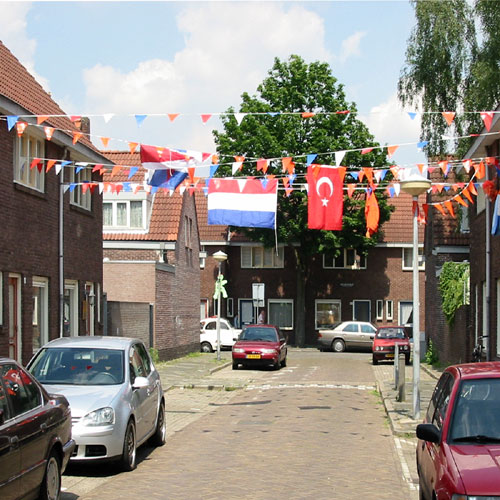
Turkish and Dutch flags in the multi-ethnic neighbourhood Kruidenbuurt, Eindhoven.

The Turkish-Dutch community form the largest ethnic minority group in the Netherlands. The majority of Dutch Turks descend from the Republic of Turkey; however there has also been significant Turkish migration waves from other post-Ottoman countries including ethnic Turkish communities which have come to the Netherlands from the Balkans (e.g. especially from Bulgaria, Greece, and North Macedonia), the island of Cyprus, and more recently during the European migrant crisis from Syria, Iraq and Kosovo. In addition, there has been migration to the Netherlands from the Turkish diaspora; many Turkish-Belgians and Turkish-Germans have arrived in the country as Belgian and German citizens.

The Dutch official census only collects data on country of birth, rather than ethnically; consequently, the total number of ethnic Turkish migrants (regardless of country of birth) nor the third, fourth or fifth generation of the Turkish-Dutch community have been collectively counted. Assistant Professor Suzanne Aalberse, Professor Ad Backus and Professor Pieter Muysken have said that "over the years" the Dutch-Turkish community "must have numbered half a million". However, there are significantly higher estimates. As early as 2003, the political scientist and international relations expert Dr Nathalie Tocci said that there was already "two million Turks in Holland". Rita van Veen also reported in Trouw that there was 2 million Turks in the Netherlands in 2007. More recently, in 2020, a report published in L1mburg Centraal estimated that there are more than 2 million Dutch-Turks. Voetbal International also reported in 2020 that the Dutch football club Fortuna Sittard will be carrying out annual scouting activities to find "Turkish talent" among the approximately 2 million Turkish-Dutch community.

In 2009 The Sophia Echo reported that Bulgarian Turks were now the fastest-growing group of immigrants in the Netherlands.

The CBS gives a total number, 444.300 Turks in 2022, up from 271.500 in 1996. About half were born in the Netherlands (second generation) and the other half outside the Netherlands (first generation) The third generation, those who are born in the Netherlands including their parents but at least one grandparent not, was 36.200 in 2022. This only accounts for people being between the age of 0 and 55. In 2022 there were about 430.000 Turks in the Netherlands. The third generation is counted as autochthonous. Thus, the total number of people in the Netherlands with at least one grandparent born in Turkey in 2022 was at least 466.200.

=== Austria ===
The Turkish community, including descendants, form the largest ethnic minority in Austria. In 2011 a report by the Initiative Minderheiten said that there was 360,000 people of Turkish origin living in Austria. This figure has also been echoed by the former Austrian Foreign Minister and Chancellor of Austria Sebastian Kurz. However, the former Austrian MEP, Andreas Mölzer, has claimed that there are 500,000 Turks in the country.

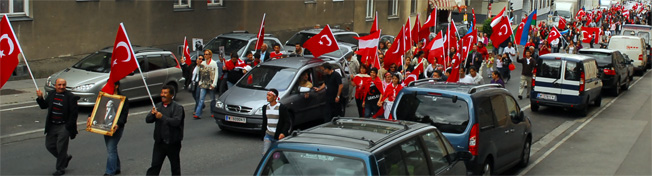
Turkish day in Vienna, Austria (2009).

=== Belgium ===
In 2012 Professor Raymond Taras said that the Belgian-Turkish community was over 200,000. More recently, in 2019 Dr Altay Manço and Dr Ertugrul Taş said that there was 250,000 Belgian residents of Turkish origin.

=== United Kingdom ===
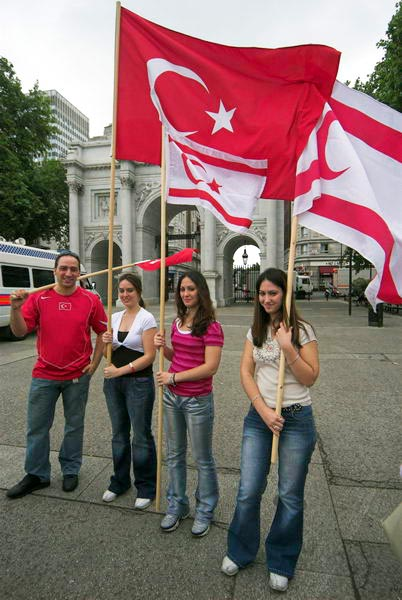
Turkish Cypriots in London.

In 2011 the Home Affairs Committee stated that there was 500,000 British Turks made up of 300,000 Turkish Cypriots, 150,000 Turkish nationals (i.e. people from Turkey), and smaller groups of Bulgarian Turks and Romanian Turks. Despite a lack of statistics on the collective number of Turks who have immigrated from their traditional homelands, it is known that Germany, Austria, the Netherlands and France all have larger Turkish diaspora communities than the UK.

=== Sweden ===
In 2009 the Swedish Ministry for Foreign Affairs said that there was almost 100,000 people with a Turkish background living in Sweden. More recently, in 2018 the Swedish Consul General, Therese Hyden, said that the population was now around 150,000.

=== Switzerland ===
In 2017 there was over 120,000 Turks living in Switzerland. They mostly live in German-speaking regions, especially in the cantons of Zurich, Aargau and Basel. Figures on naturalization and migration from Turkey has been declining, however, the Swiss population with a Turkish background continues to grow.

=== Denmark ===
The Turkish community form the largest ethnic minority in Denmark. In 2008, it was estimated that Danes of Turkish origin numbered 70,000.

=== Italy ===
In 2020 there were 50,000 Turkish citizens living in Italy; however, this figure does not include naturalized Italian citizens of Turkish origin or their descendants. Between 2008 and 2020 some 5,295 Turkish citizens acquired Italian citizenship.

In addition to the diaspora, some of the population in Moena has identified as Turkish since the 17th century.

=== Norway ===
In 2013 there were roughly 16,500 Norwegians of Turkish descent living in Norway.

=== Finland ===
In 2010 Professor Zeki Kütük said that there was approximately 10,000 people of Turkish origin living in Finland.

=== Poland ===
In 2013 data from the Institute of Public Affairs showed that there was 5,000 Turks living in Poland.

=== Portugal ===
In 2021 data from the National Statistical Institute showed that there were 1,363 Turks legally living in Portugal. In addition, between 2002 and 2020, 270 Turks acquired Portuguese citizenship.

=== Luxembourg ===
Luxembourg does not formally collect ethnic or racial data of its citizens, however according to the Turkish embassy in Luxembourg, about 1,000 Turkish nationals were living in Luxembourg around the time of the 2017 Turkish referendum. Close to 10,000 Turkish people voted from Luxembourg, the others having come from neighbouring countries, who found the Luxembourg voting location closer to their homes.

=== Liechtenstein ===
Liechtenstein does not record data on the ethnicity of its citizens; however, in 2009, the Turkish community was estimated to number approximately 1,000 out of a total population of 35,000. Hence, estimates suggest that the Turks form around 3% of Liechtenstein's total population and that they are the fifth largest ethnic group in the country.

== North America ==
=== United States ===
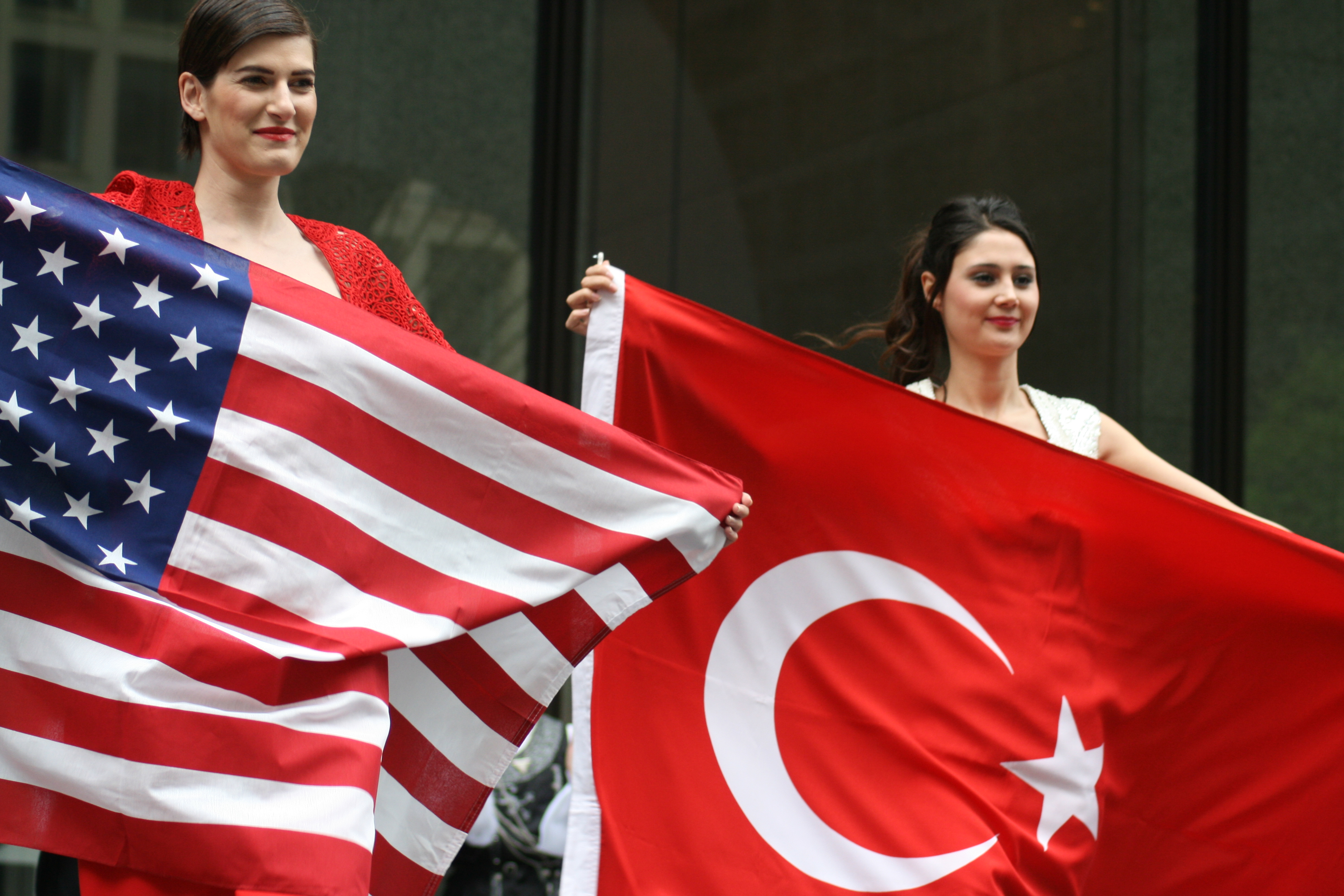
As of 2012, there are approximately 1 million Turkish Americans.

In 1996 Professor John J. Grabowski estimated that there was 500,000 Turks living in the United States. By 2009, Erdal Şafak said that the Turkish American community was approximately 850,000 to 900,000. More recently, in 2012 the former United States Secretary of Commerce, John Bryson, confirmed at the Center for American Progress that the Turkish American community was now over 1,000,000:

Here in the U.S., you can see our person-to-person relationships growing stronger each day. You can see it in the 13,000 Turkish students that are studying here in the U.S. You can see it in corporate leaders like Muhtar Kent, the CEO of Coca-Cola, and you can see it in more than one million Turkish-Americans who add to the rich culture and fabric of our country. – John Bryson (2012)

There are, however, much higher estimates. Non-governmental Turkish organizations in the USA claim that there are at least 3,000,000 people of Turkish origin living in the United States, including Turkish Americans as well as new Turkish migrant workers, students and illegal migrants. Consequently, since the twenty-first century, the Turkish American population is fast approaching the significant number of Turks in Germany because most students, expats, etc. decide to live permanently in the United States.

=== Canada ===
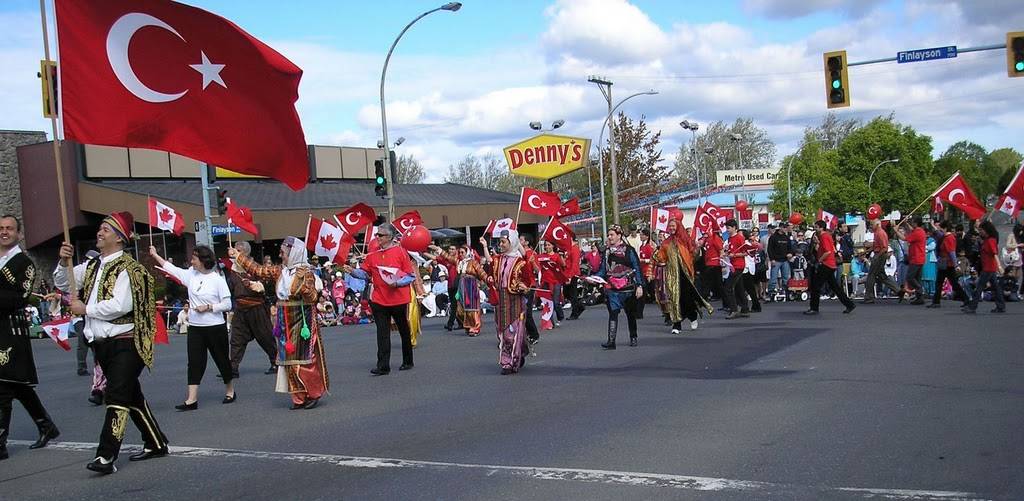
Turkish community in Victoria, Canada.

According to the 2016 Canadian census, 63,955 people voluntarily declared their ethnicity as "Turkish". However, in 2018, the Canadian Ambassador Chris Cooter said that there was approximately 100,000 Turkish Canadians living in the country, as well as several thousand Turkish students:

We have a growing Turkish diaspora and they're doing very well in Canada. We think it's 100,000, largely in Toronto. We have several thousand Turkish students in Canada as well. We are trying to make sure that two-way relationship is growing. – Canadian Ambassador Chris Cooter (2018)

The "Federation of Canadian Turkish Associations" and the "Federation of Chinese Canadians in Markham" have also reported that there was over 100,000 Turkish Canadians living in the country.

== South America ==
=== Venezuela ===
According to statistics, there are likely around 27,000 people of Turkish ancestry in Venezuela. This refers to people who are either descendants of immigrants who came from the Ottoman Empire before 1923 or who came from the Republic of Turkey since then. Additionally, Turks who immigrated from countries neighboring Turkey are also counted in this figure. It's likely that most of the Turkish Venezuelans trace their ancestry to immigrants from the Ottoman Empire, who arrived to Venezuela at the same time most of the Arab diaspora in South America had emigrated as well.

=== Brazil ===
According to Brazilian statistics, there are 6,200 Turkish-born people living in Brazil as of 2024.

== Oceania ==
=== Australia ===
In 1994 a report by The Age estimated that the Turkish Australian community numbered 150,000. By 2013 Louise Asher, who was a member of the Victorian Legislative Assembly, said that the Turkish Australian community in Melbourne alone had numbered 300,000. More recently, the number of Turkish Australians who originate from Turkey reached 200,000 in 2017; in addition, the Turkish Cypriot-Australian community was estimated to number 120,000 in 2016.

=== New Zealand ===
In 2010 the Turkish-New Zealander population was estimated to number between 2,000 and 3,000; in addition, the Turkish Cypriot-New Zealander population was 1,600 in 2016.

== The Middle East ==
=== United Arab Emirates ===
In 2010, the number of Turkish citizens living in the UAE was around 8000, by 2014 this number had increased to around 10,000 and it increased to 40,000 in 2023. This shows that the Turkish population in the UAE has been steadily rising since the 2010s. In recent years, many Turkish doctors have moved to Dubai and Abu Dhabi.

== Algerian Turks ==
Initially, the first wave of migration occurred in 1830 when many Turks were forced to leave the region once the French took control over Algeria; approximately 10,000 were shipped off to Turkey whilst many others migrated to other regions of the Ottoman Empire, including Palestine, Syria, Arabia, and Egypt. Furthermore, some Turkish/Kouloughli families also settled in Morocco (such as in Tangier and Tétouan).

In regards to modern migration, there are many Algerian Turks who have emigrated to Europe and, hence, make up part of Algeria's diaspora. For example, there is a noticeable Algerian community of Turkish descent living in England. Many Algerians attend the Suleymaniye Mosque which is owned by the British-Turkish community. There are also thousands of Algerian Turks living in France. Germany, Switzerland, the Netherlands, Belgium, Canada, and Spain are also top receiving countries of Algerian citizens.

== Cretan Turks ==
Country	Prof Andrew Rippin (1971 estimates)	Further information
Turkey	200,000	
Egypt	100,000	
Libya	100,000	
Lebanon; Palestine; Syria	50,000	

== Cypriot Turks ==
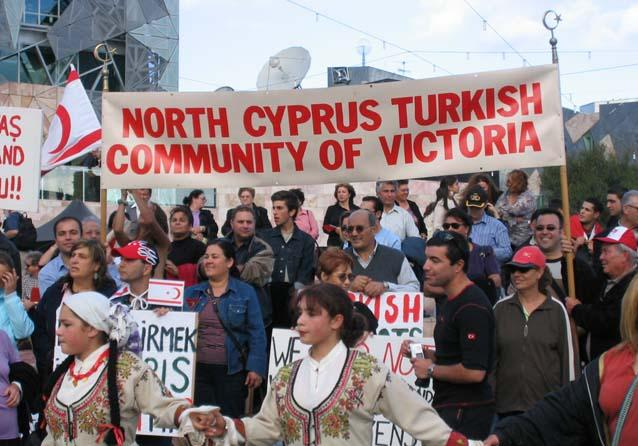
Turkish Cypriots in Victoria, Australia

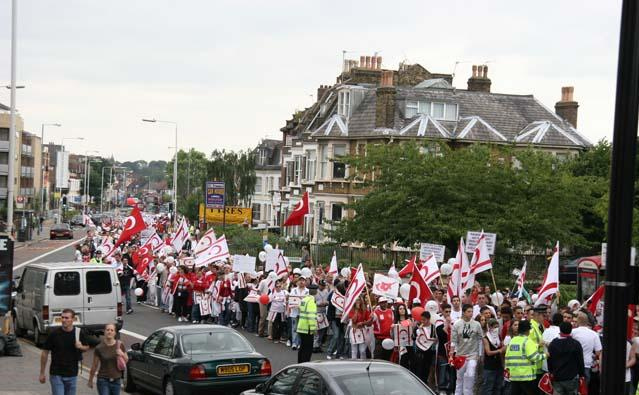
Turkish Cypriots protesting in London, the United Kingdom.

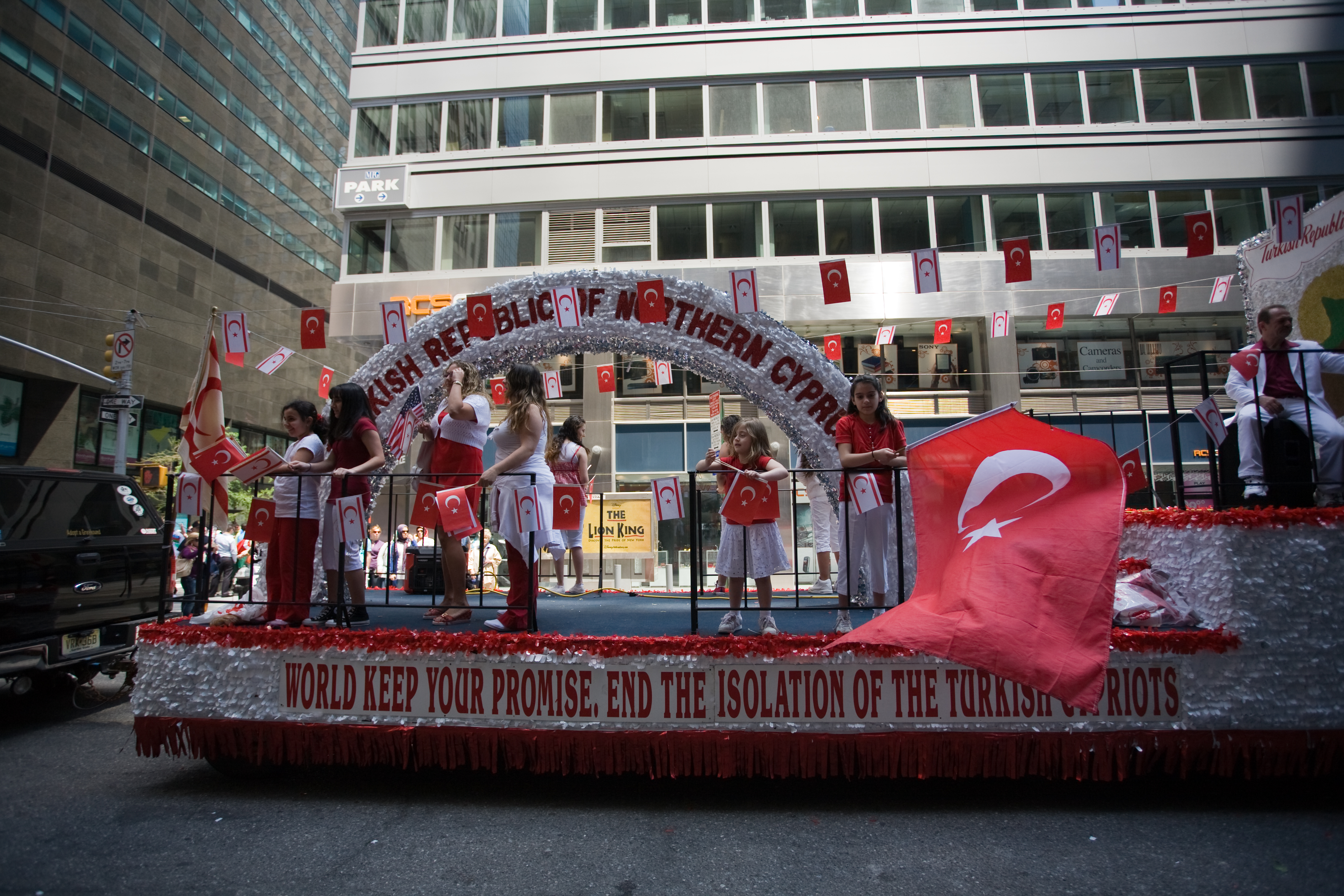
Turkish Cypriots in New York, United States

Country	Council of Europe (1993 estimate)	TRNC Ministry of Foreign Affairs (2001 estimate)	TÜBİTAK (2016 estimate)	Other estimates	Further information
Turkey	300,000 (immigrants only)	500,000	500,000	300,000 (1968 estimate); Including descendants, exceeding 600,000 (2018 estimate)	see Turkish Cypriot muhacirs
United Kingdom	100,000 (immigrants only in England)	200,000	300,000	300,000-400,000 (including descendants)	British Cypriots; British Turks
Australia	30,000 (immigrants only)	40,000	120,000	120,000 (including descendants)	Turkish Australian
North America; United States; Canada	N/A; 6,000 (immigrants only); 6,000 (immigrants only)	10,000; N/A; N/A	N/A; 5,000; 1,800	N/A; 5,000; 1,800	Cypriot American; Turkish American; Turkish Canadians
Palestine	N/A	N/A	N/A	4,000 (early twentieth century Turkish Cypriot brides only)	
Germany	N/A	N/A	2,000	2,000	Turks in Germany
New Zealand	N/A	N/A	1,600	1,600	Turks in New Zealand
South Africa	N/A	N/A	"small community"	N/A	Turks in South Africa
Other	N/A	5,000	N/A	N/A	

== Indian Turks ==
There is a roughly 2000+ strong Turkish community living in India in the cities of Delhi, Mumbai and Hyderabad

== Iraqi Turks ==
Most Iraqi Turkmen migrate to Turkey followed by Germany, Denmark, and Sweden. There are also Iraqi Turkmen communities living in Canada, the United States, Australia, New Zealand, Greece, the Netherlands, and the United Kingdom.

There are many established Iraqi Turkmen diaspora communities, such as the Canadian Iraqi Turkmen Culture Association, based in Canada.

== Lebanese Turks ==
Due to the numerous wars in Lebanon since the 1970s onwards, many Lebanese Turks have sought refuge in Turkey and Europe, particularly in Germany. Indeed, many Lebanese Turks were aware of the large German-Turkish population and saw this as an opportunity to find work once settling in Europe. In particular, the largest wave of Lebanese-Turkish migration occurred once the Israel-Lebanon war of 2006 began. During this period more than 20,000 Turks fled Lebanon, particularly from Beirut, and settled in Germany.

== Meskhetian Turks ==
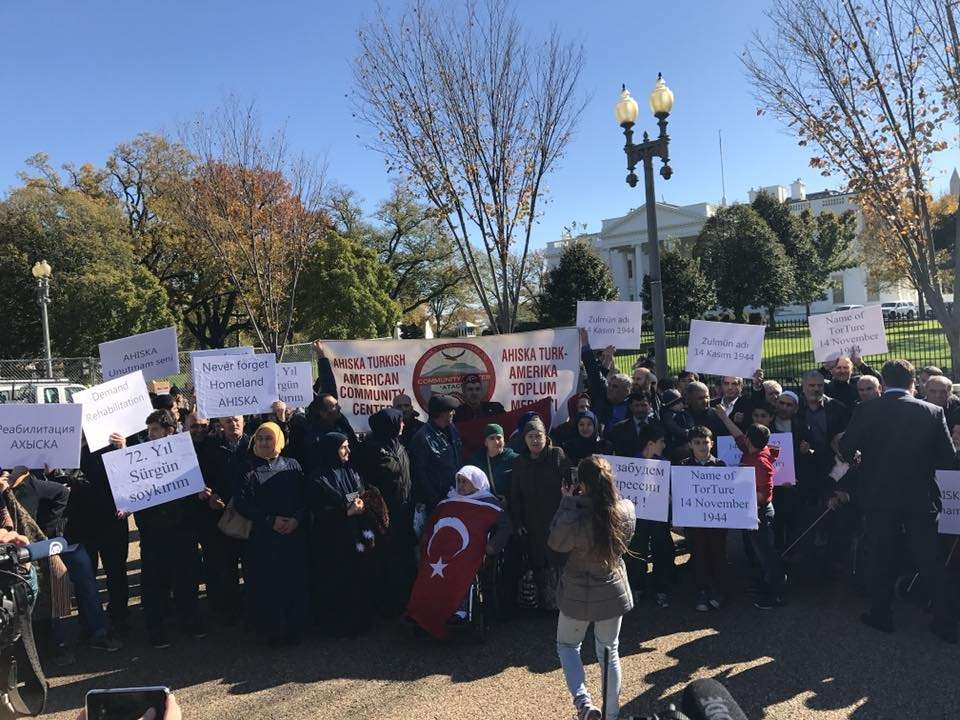
Meskhetian ("Ahiska") Turks outside the White House in Washington D.C., United States.

Country	Dr Aydıngün (2006 estimate)	Al Jazeera (2014 estimate)	Further information
Kazakhstan	150,000	180,000	
Azerbaijan	90,000-110,000	87,000	
Russia	70,000-90,000	95,000	
Kyrgyzstan	50,000	42,000	
Turkey	40,000	76,000	
United States	15,000	16,000	
Uzbekistan	15,000	38,000	
Ukraine	10,000	8,000	
Northern Cyprus		180	

== Palestinian Turks ==
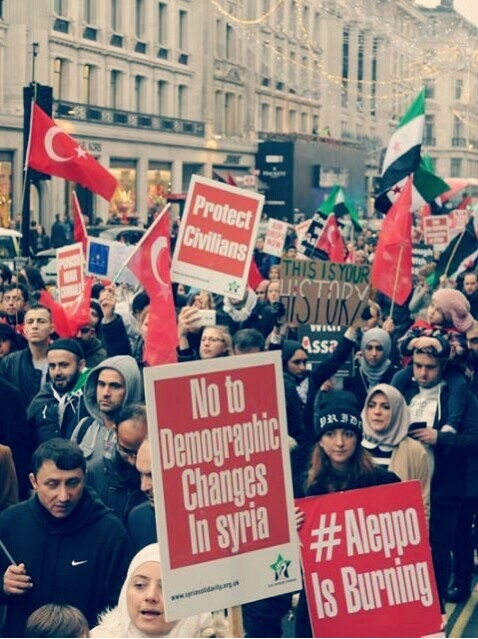
Syrian Turks waving Turkish and Syrian flags whilst shouting slogans: "No To Demographic Changes in Syria' and 'No To Genocide' during the December 2016 protests in London.

Both during and after the 1947–1949 Palestine war, some members of Palestine's Turkish minority fled the region (particularly the Jezreel Valley region and the Golan Heights) and settled in Lebanon, Syria, and Jordan. In Jordan, there is approximately 55,000 Palestinian-Turkish refugees in Irbid 5,000 near Amman 5,000 in El-Sahne 3,000 in El-Reyyan 2,500 in El-Bakaa 1,500 in El-Zerkaa and 1,500 in Sahab

== Syrian Turks ==
Since the outbreak of the Syrian Civil War, hundreds of thousands of Syrian Turkmen have been internally displaced and/or forced to leave the country, and most of them have sought refuge in neighbouring states and Western Europe. In particular, approximately 300,000 to 500,000 Syrian Turkmen have taken refuge in the Republic of Turkey. Moreover, there are between 125,000 and 150,000 Syrian Turkmen refugees in Lebanon, which means they outnumber the long-established Turkish minority in Lebanon.

In 2020 it was reported that 1 million Syrian Turkmen were living in Turkey and demanding that the Turkish government grant them Turkish citizenship.

== Turkish Jews ==
In 2012, it was estimated that around 280,000 Jews living in Israel were from Turkey or of Turkish descent. In Israel, the Arkadaş Association was founded by Turkish Jews to maintain their relationship with Turkey.

== Western Thrace Turks ==
In 1990, it was estimated that around 300,000 to 400,000 Western Thrace Turks had migrated to Turkey since 1923. Moreover, from the 1950s onwards, Turks of Western Thrace began to immigrate to Western Europe alongside other Greek citizens. Whilst many Western Thrace Turks had intended to return to Greece after working for a number of years, a new Greek law was introduced which effectively forced the minority to remain in their host countries. Article 19 of the 1955 Greek Constitution essentially stripped the Western Thrace Turks living abroad (particularly those in Germany and Turkey) of their Greek citizenship. According to Article 19 of the Greek Constitution

A person of non-Greek ethnic origin leaving Greece without the intention of returning may be declared as having lost Greek nationality.

This law continued to effect Western Thrace Turks studying in Turkey and Germany in the late 1980s. A report published by the Human Rights Watch in 1990 confirmed that:

Under Article 19, ethnic Turks can be stripped of their citizenship by an administrative decree, without a hearing. According to the U.S. State Department's 1989 Country Report, under Greek law there can be no judicial review and there is no effective right of appeal.

Despite many being stripped of their Greek citizenship since 1955, Western Thrace Turks continued to migrate to Western Europe the 1960s and 1970s because the Thracian tobacco industry was affected by a severe crisis and many tobacco growers lost their income. Between 1970 and 2010, approximately 40,000 Western Thrace Turks arrived in Western Europe, most of which settled in Germany. In addition, between 2010 and 2018, a further 30,000 Western Thrace Turks left for Western Europe due to the Greek government-debt crisis. Thus, in addition to the thousands who migrated in the 1950s and 1960s, 70,000 Western Thrace Turks have migrated to Western Europe between 1970 and 2018. Around 80% of the Western Thracian Turks in Western Europe are living in Germany. The remainder have emigrated to the Netherlands, the United Kingdom, Austria and Italy; furthermore, outside of Europe, they have built communities in Australia, Canada and the United States.

== Politics ==
=== 2023 and 2018 Turkish presidential election ===
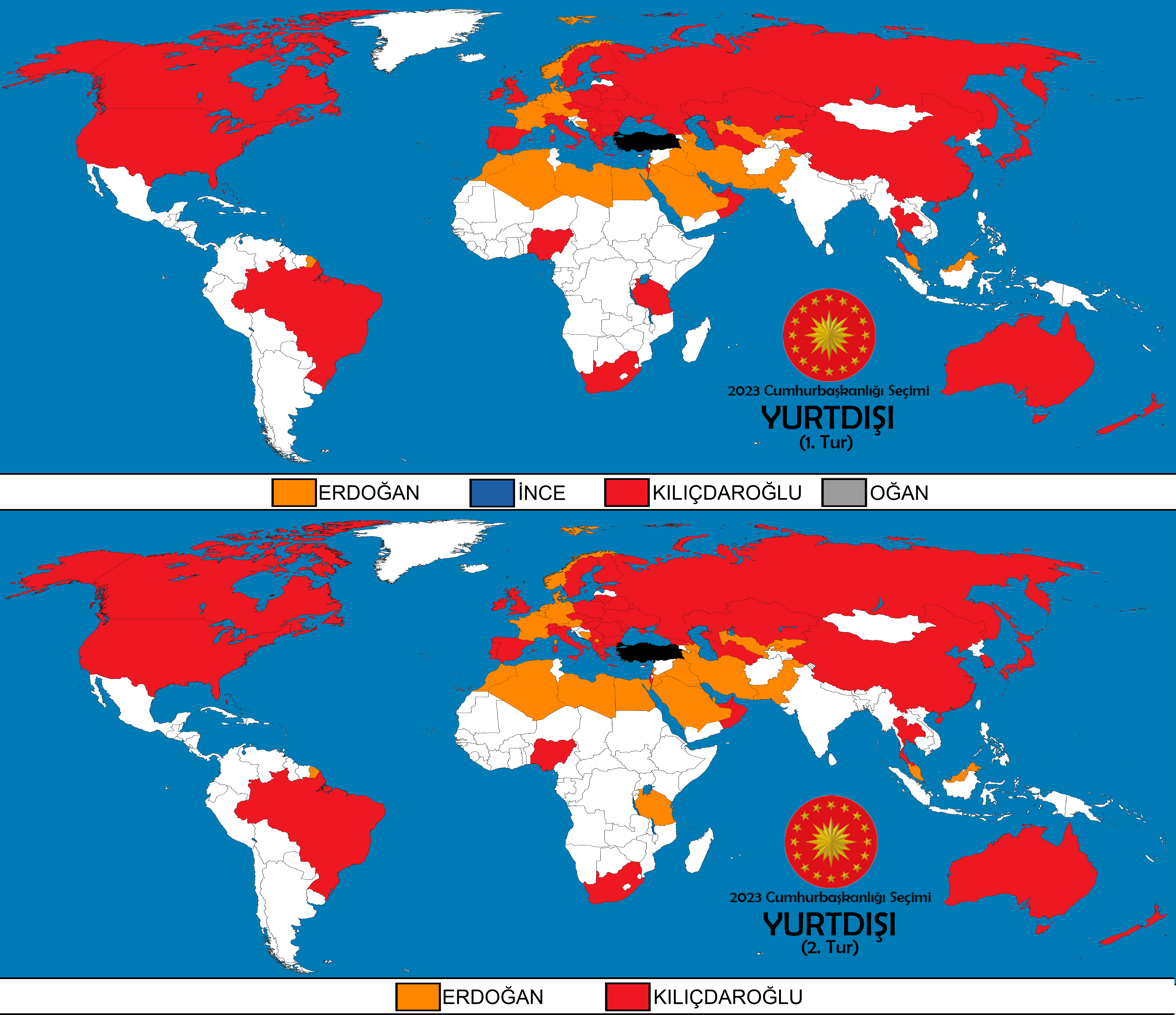
Results of voters abroad in the first and second rounds. In 2023 Turkish presidential election

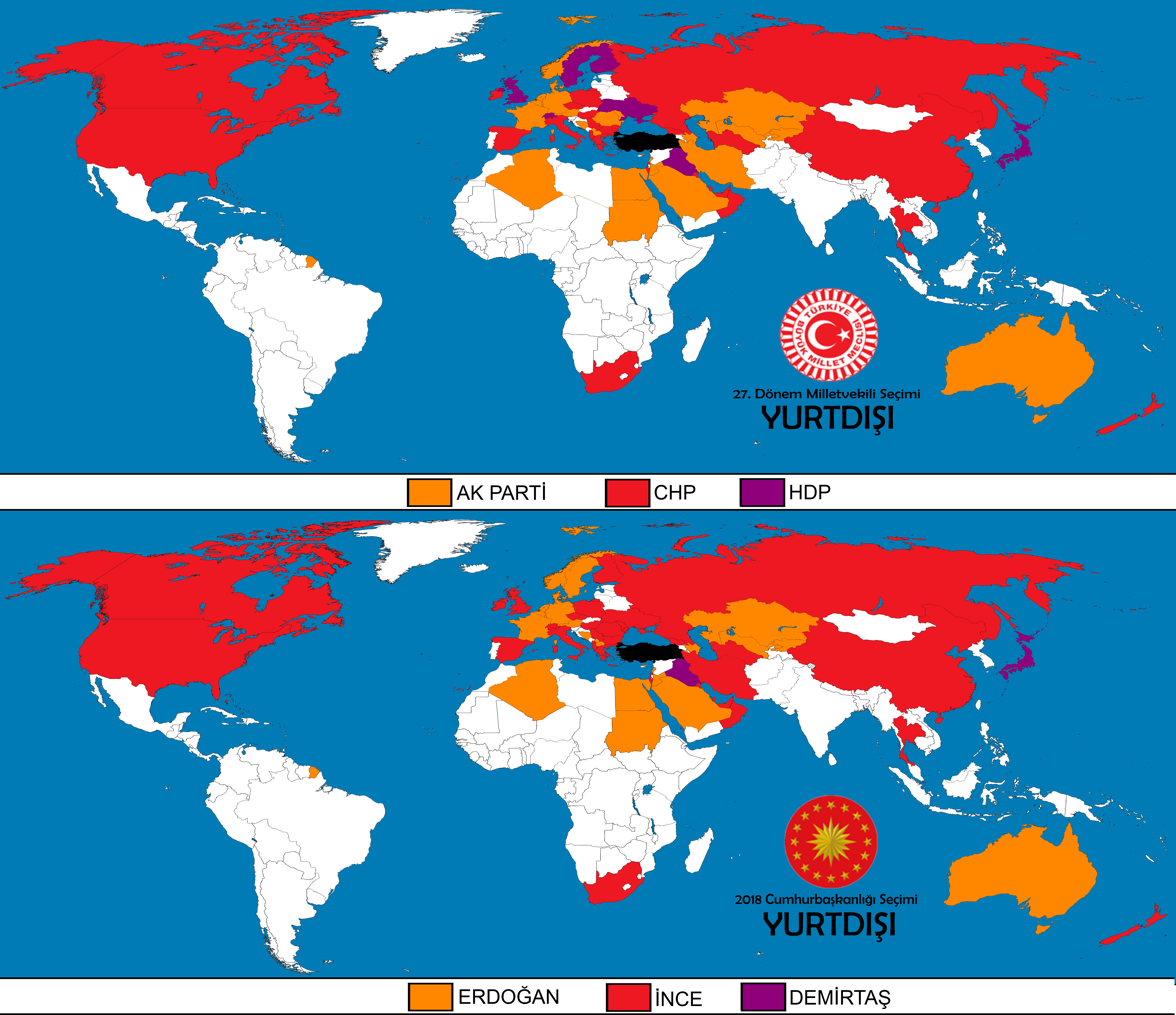
Results of voters abroad in the first and second rounds. in 2018 Turkish presidential election

=== 2017 Turkish constitutional referendum ===
Results by foreign nation (Yes in blue)

Country	Yes	Yes (%)	No	No (%)
Albania	153	41.80%	213	58.20%
Algeria	356	43.00%	472	57.00%
Australia	5,960	41.82%	8,290	58.18%
Austria	38,215	73.23%	13,972	26.77%
Azerbaijan	1,024	38.31%	1,649	61.69%
Bahrain	69	13.56%	440	86.44%
Belgium	54,083	74.98%	18,044	25.02%
Bosnia and Herzegovina	750	61.83%	463	38.17%
Bulgaria	365	28.65%	909	71.35%
Canada	3,247	27.92%	8,384	72.08%
China	213	23.77%	683	76.23%
Czech Republic	73	12.54%	509	87.46%
Denmark	6,604	60.63%	4,288	39.37%
Egypt	259	59.00%	180	41.00%
Finland	558	28.45%	1,403	71.55%
France	91,266	64.85%	49,475	35.15%
Georgia	285	40.66%	416	59.34%
Germany	412,149	63.07%	241,353	36.93%
Greece	176	22.62%	602	77.38%
Hungary	232	25.75%	669	74.25%
Iran	121	45.32%	146	54.68%
Iraq	119	34.59%	225	65.41%
Ireland	173	19.93%	695	80.07%
Israel	284	43.43%	370	56.57%
Italy	2,135	37.94%	3,492	62.06%
Japan	416	36.11%	736	63.89%
Jordan	349	75.87%	111	24.13%
Kazakhstan	636	41.41%	900	58.59%
Kosovo	404	57.14%	303	42.86%
Kuwait	191	23.38%	626	76.62%
Kyrgyzstan	499	57.36%	371	42.64%
Lebanon	1,058	93.88%	69	6.12%
Luxembourg	5,987	62.86%	3,538	37.14%
Macedonia	618	57.97%	448	42.03%
Netherlands	82,672	70.94%	33,871	29.06%
New Zealand	32	17.68%	149	82.32%
Northern Cyprus	19,225	45.18%	23,324	54.82%
Norway	2,193	57.20%	1,641	42.80%
Oman	138	24.04%	436	75.96%
Poland	302	25.61%	877	74.39%
Qatar	241	18.89%	1,035	81.11%
Romania	824	44.64%	1,022	55.36%
Russia	833	26.02%	2,368	73.98%
Saudi Arabia	4,475	55.06%	3,653	44.94%
Singapore	284	44.31%	357	55.69%
South Africa	126	36.84%	216	63.16%
Spain	172	13.32%	1,119	86.68%
Sudan	240	65.93%	124	34.07%
Sweden	4,367	47.09%	4,902	52.91%
Switzerland	19,181	38.08%	31,193	61.92%
Thailand	27	12.92%	182	87.02%
Turkmenistan	510	43.74%	656	56.26%
Ukraine	341	35.74	613	64.26%
United Arab Emirates	395	13.31%	2,572	86.69%
United Kingdom	7,177	20.26%	28,247	79.79%
United States	5,296	16.20%	27,397	83.80%
Uzbekistan	169	53.65%	146	46.35%
Border Gates	52,961	54.17%	44,816	45.83%
Overseas results	831,208	59.09%	575,365	40.91%

=== November 2015 Turkish general election ===
Country	Party
Albania	CHP
Algeria	AKP
Australia	AKP
Austria	AKP
Azerbaijan	AKP
Bahrain	CHP
Belgium	AKP
Bosnia	AKP
Bulgaria	CHP

Country	Party
Canada	HDP
China	CHP
Czech Republic	CHP
Denmark	AKP
Egypt	AKP
Finland	HDP
France	AKP
Georgia	CHP
Germany	AKP

Country	Party
Greece	CHP
Hungary	CHP
Iran	CHP
Ireland	CHP
Israel	CHP
Italy	HDP
Japan	HDP
Jordan	AKP
Kazakhstan	AKP

Country	Party
Kosovo	AKP
Kuwait	CHP
Kyrgyzstan	AKP
Lebanon	AKP
Macedonia	AKP
Netherlands	AKP
New Zealand	CHP
Northern Cyprus	AKP
Norway	AKP

Country	Party
Oman	CHP
Poland	HDP
Qatar	CHP
Romania	AKP
Russia	CHP
Saudi Arabia	AKP
South Africa	CHP
Spain	CHP
Sudan	AKP

Country	Party
Sweden	AKP
Switzerland	HDP
Thailand	HDP
Turkmenistan	AKP
Ukraine	HDP
United Arab Emirates	CHP
United Kingdom	HDP
United States	CHP
Uzbekistan	AKP

=== June 2015 Turkish general election ===
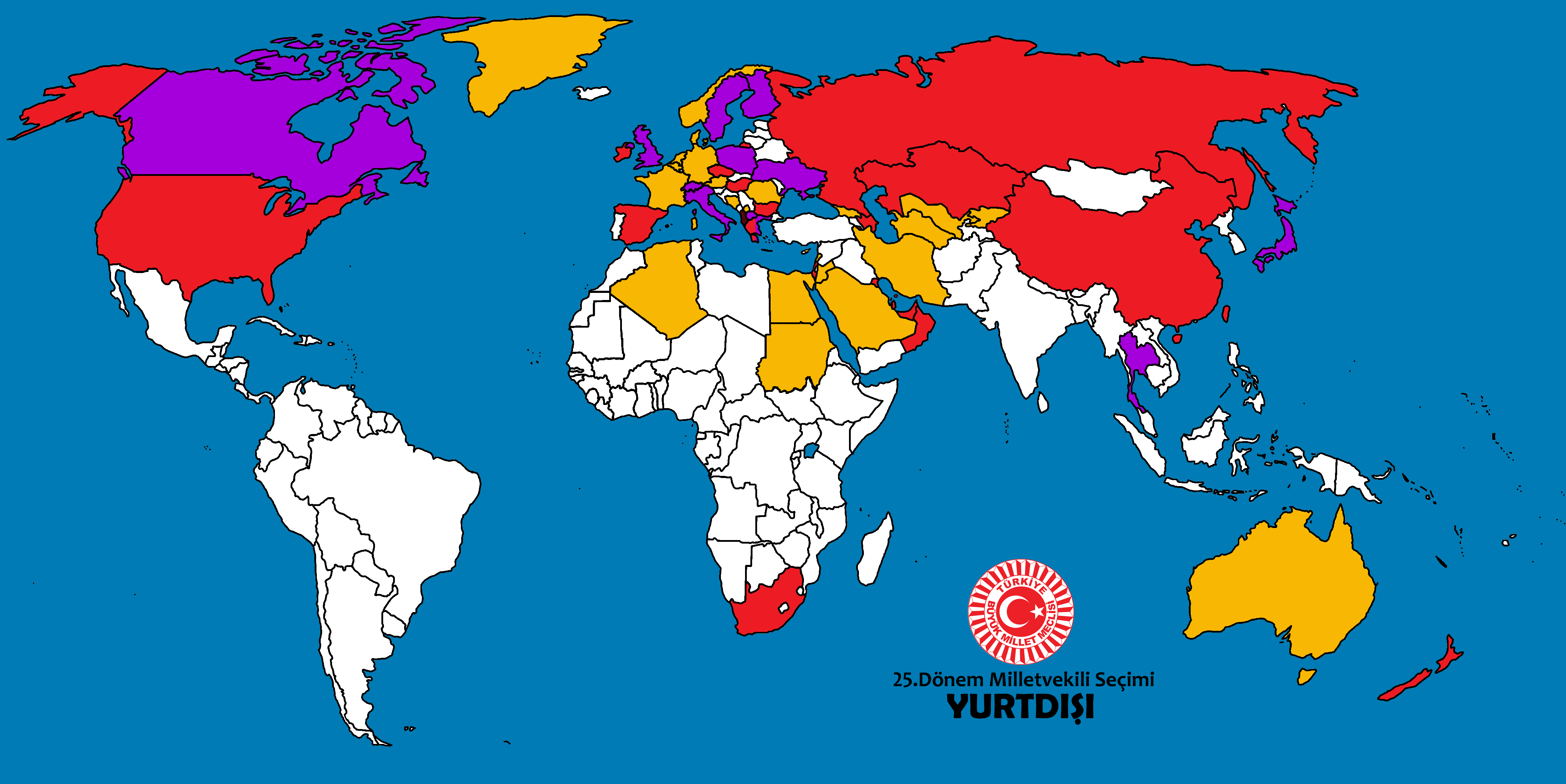
Winners according to countries, with ties shown in black

Overseas vote share
AKP	50.37%
HDP	21.43%
CHP	15.93%
MHP	9.09%
Others	3.18%

This was the second election, after the 2014 presidential election, in which Turkish expats were given the right to vote. Furthermore, votes were also cast 38 customs gates in airports, ports and border gates around the country. In an overseas vote period lasting 23 days between 8 May and 31 May 2015, the turnout was significantly higher than that in the presidential election, reaching 37% as opposed to the 8% recorded in 2014.

Out of the 54 countries where expats were given the vote, the Justice and Development Party (AKP) won the most votes in 23 countries. The Republican People's Party (CHP) won the most votes in 18 countries. The Peoples' Democratic Party (HDP) won the most votes in 11 countries and the Nationalist Movement Party (MHP) managed to win the most votes in only one country, namely Albania.

The overseas vote, which had been won by AKP candidate Recep Tayyip Erdoğan with over 62.3% in the 2014 presidential election, showed a significant swing of around 10% from the AKP to the HDP, which increased its overseas vote share from 9.8% (that their candidate Selahattin Demirtaş won in 2014) to over 20%. The AKP, on the other hand, won just over 50%, coming first due to strong support from countries with a significant Turkish expat population, such as Germany and Austria.

The following table shows the winners according to countries in which Turkish consulates held voting periods for the election.

Country	Party
Albania	MHP
Algeria	AKP
Australia	AKP
Austria	AKP
Azerbaijan	CHP
Bahrain	CHP
Belgium	AKP
Bosnia	AKP
Bulgaria	CHP

Country	Party
Canada	HDP
China	CHP
Czech Republic	CHP
Denmark	AKP
Egypt	AKP
Finland	HDP
France	AKP
Georgia	AKP
Germany	AKP

Country	Party
Greece	TIE*
Hungary	CHP
Iran	AKP
Ireland	CHP
Israel	CHP
Italy	HDP
Japan	HDP
Jordan	AKP
Kazakhstan	CHP

Country	Party
Kosovo	AKP
Kuwait	CHP
Kyrgyzstan	AKP
Lebanon	AKP
Macedonia	HDP
Netherlands	AKP
New Zealand	CHP
Northern Cyprus	AKP
Norway	AKP

Country	Party
Oman	CHP
Poland	HDP
Qatar	CHP
Romania	AKP
Russia	CHP
Saudi Arabia	AKP
South Africa	CHP
Spain	CHP
Sudan	AKP

Country	Party
Sweden	HDP
Switzerland	HDP
Thailand	HDP
Turkmenistan	AKP
Ukraine	HDP
United Arab Emirates	CHP
United Kingdom	HDP
United States	CHP
Uzbekistan	AKP

* In Greece, the HDP and CHP each received 174 votes (29.4%) and came joint first.

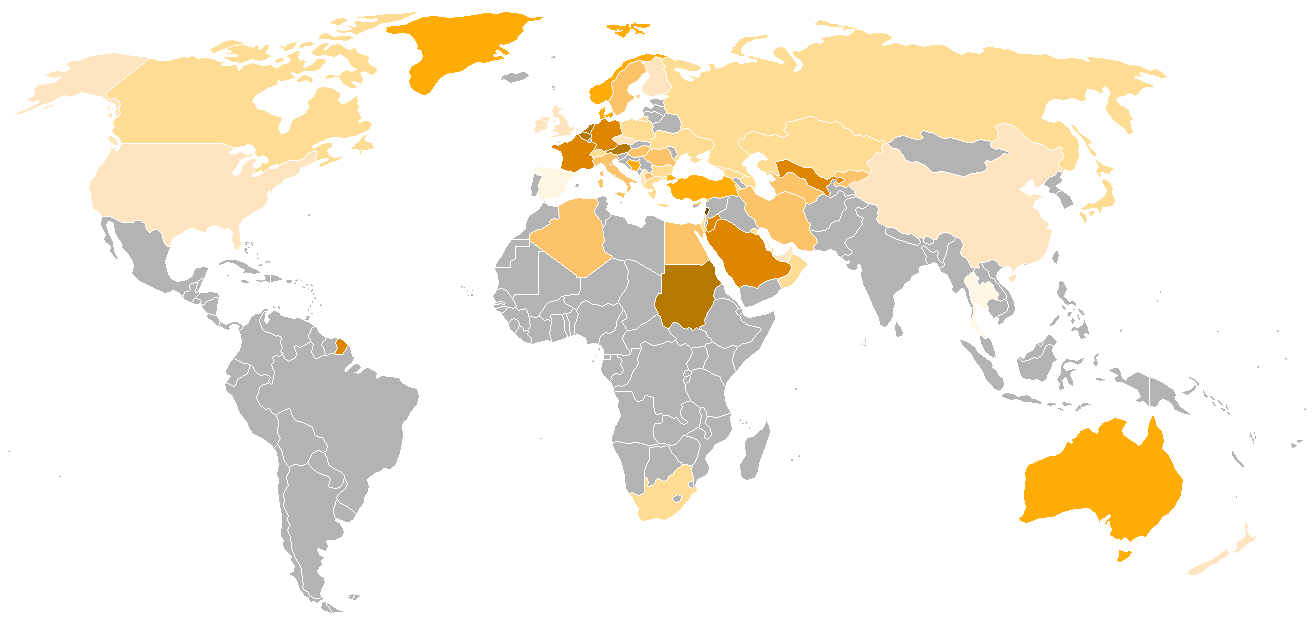
Results obtained by the Justice and Development Party by country. 0–10% 10–20% 20–30% 30–40% 40–50% 50–60% 60–70% 70–80% 80–90%

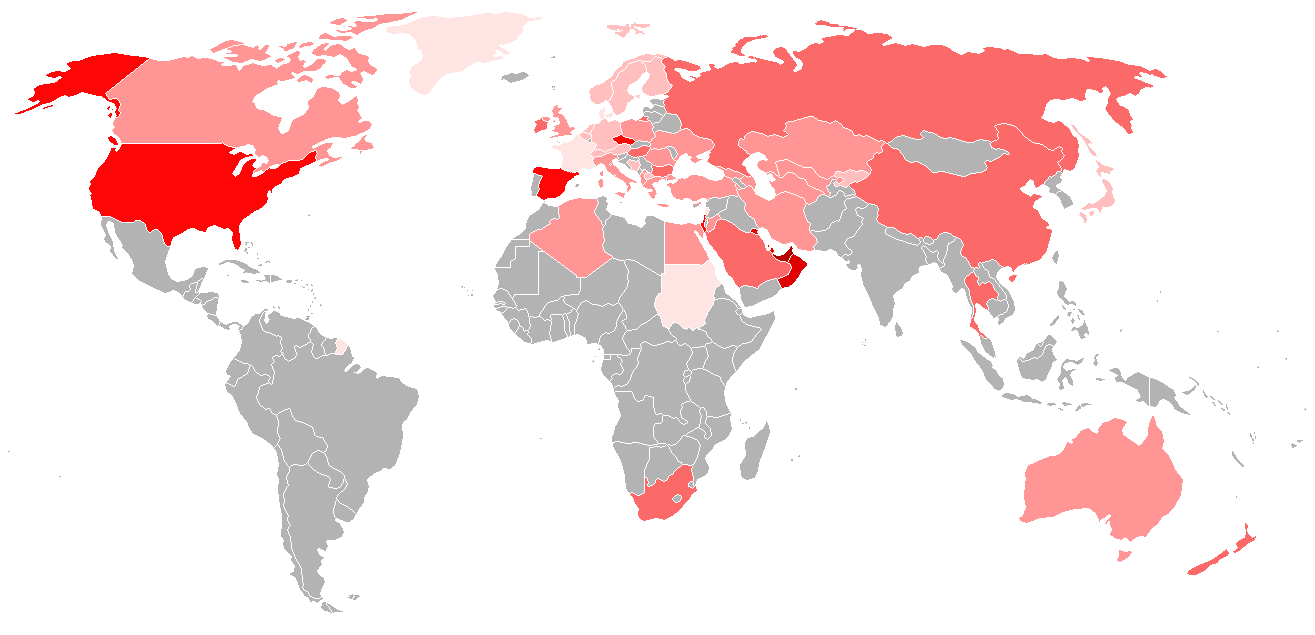
Results obtained by the Republican People's Party by country. 0–10% 10–20% 20–30% 30–40% 40–50% 50–60% 60–70%

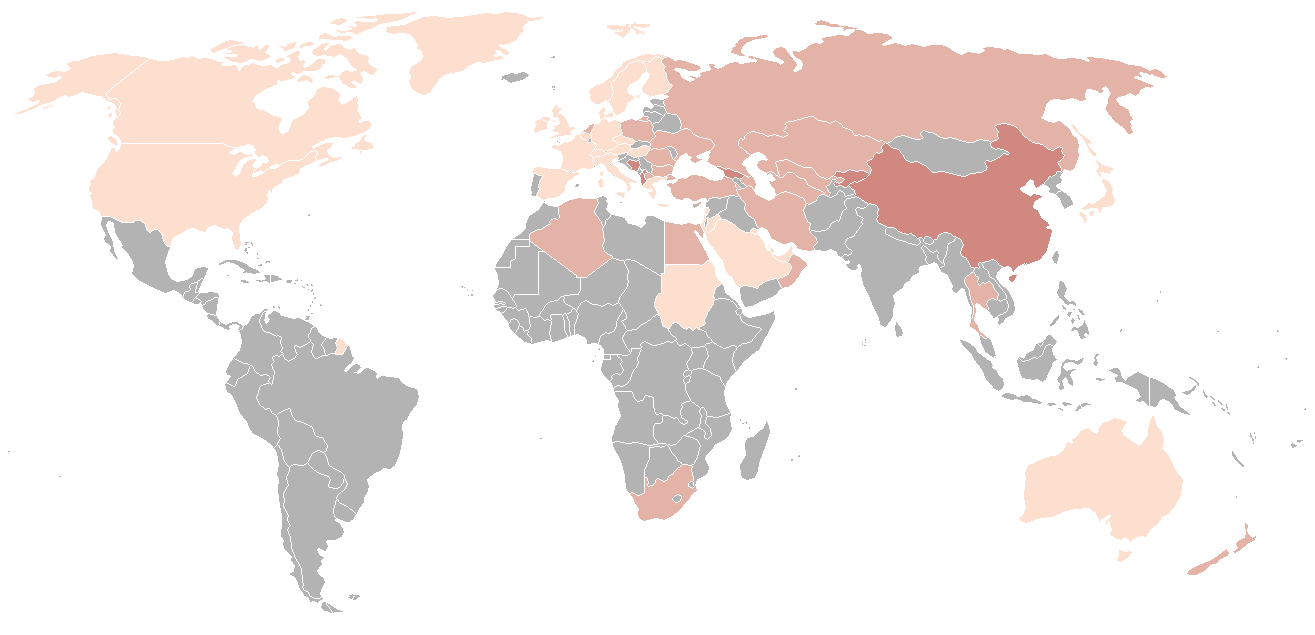
Results obtained by the Nationalist Movement Party by country. 0–10% 10–20% 20–30% 30–40%

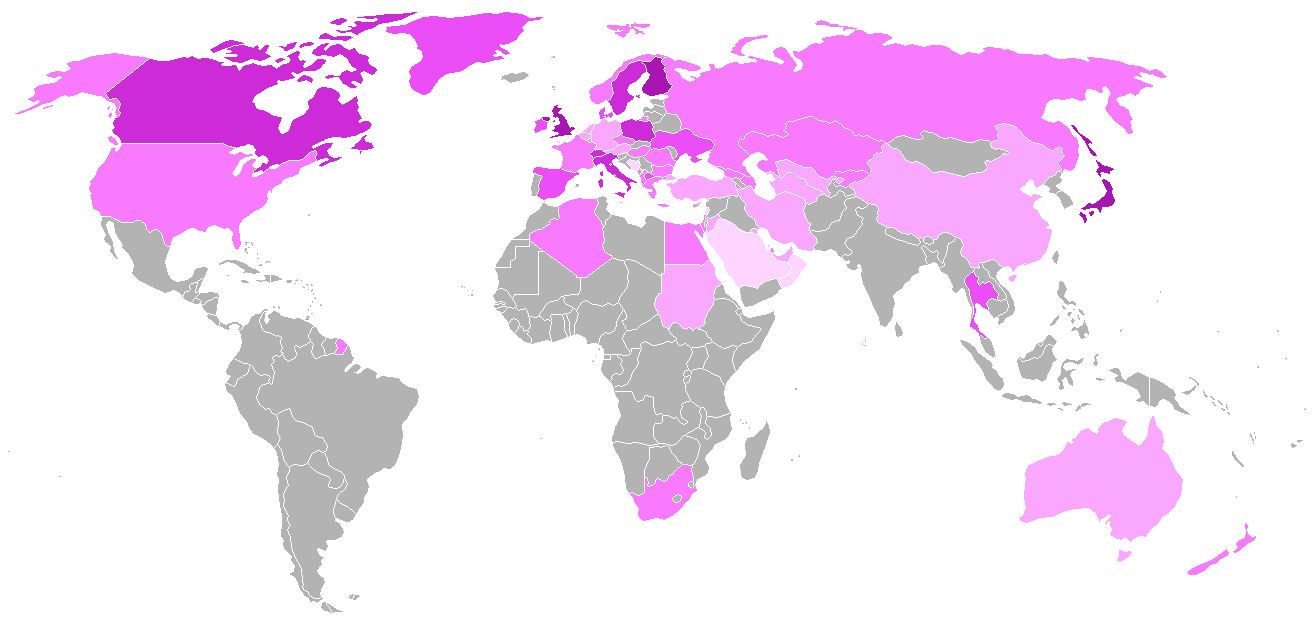
Results obtained by the Peoples' Democratic Party by country. 0–10% 10–20% 20–30% 30–40% 40–50% 50–60%

=== 2014 Turkish presidential election ===
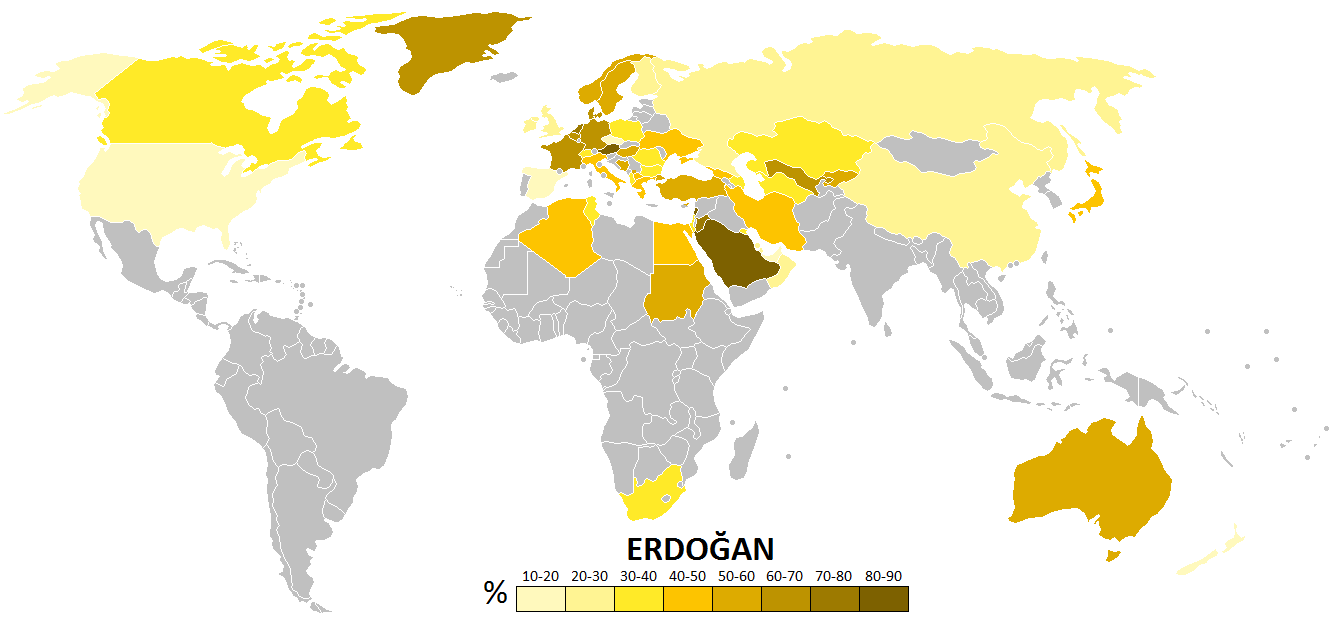
Results obtained by Recep Tayyip Erdoğan by country

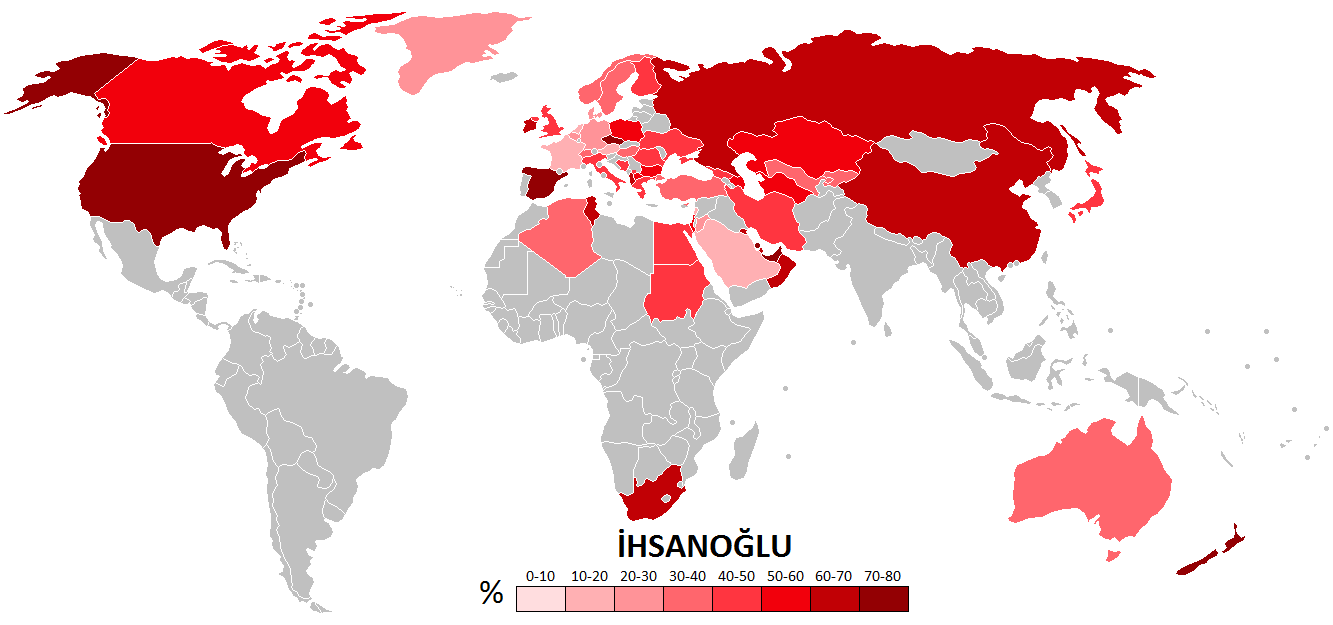
Results obtained by Ekmeleddin İhsanoğlu by country

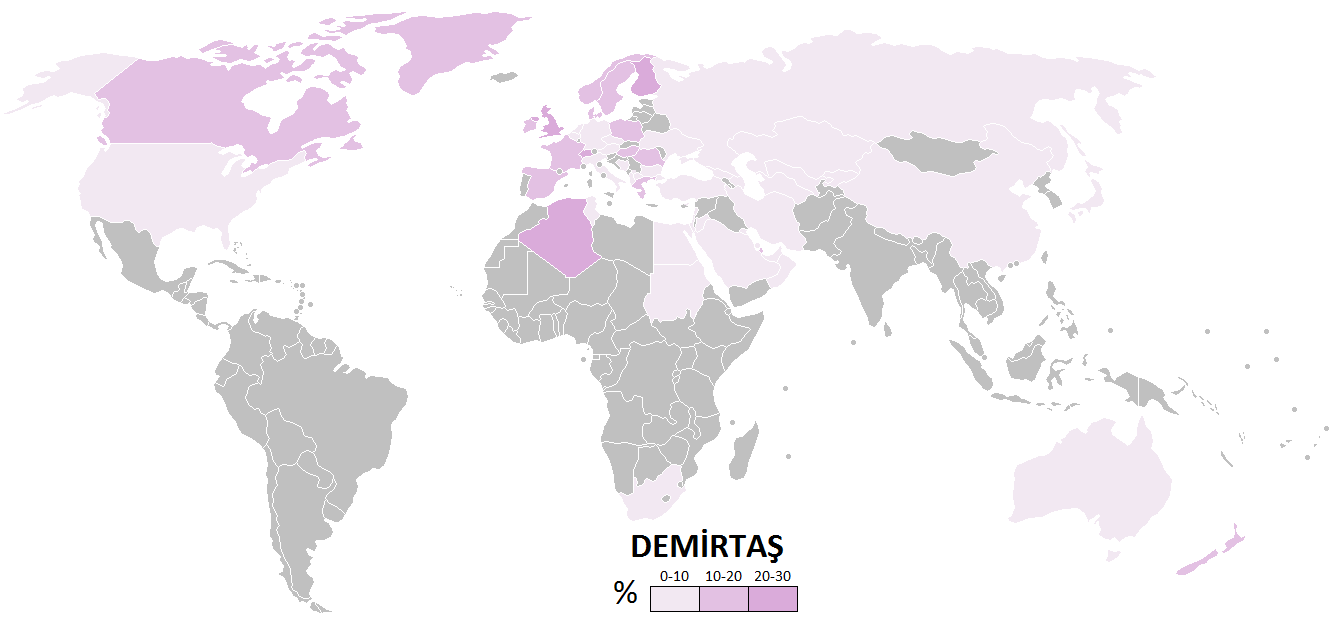
Results obtained by Selahattin Demirtaş by country

Results are listed in alphabetical order. Although Ekmeleddin İhsanoğlu won the most pluralities and majorities, the significantly larger Turkish electorate in countries that heavily voted for Erdoğan resulted in Erdoğan breaking many predictions by receiving nearly two thirds of the overseas vote. In Cairo, the city in which İhsanoğlu was born, 53.73% voted for İhsanoğlu with 44.03% voting for Erdoğan. Regardless, İhsanoğlu won in Egypt by just one vote, due to large support for Erdoğan in Alexandria. Note that in the maps, Greenland is considered part of Denmark, despite the fact that no voting took place in Greenland.

Country	Erdoğan	İhsanoğlu	Demirtaş
Albania	35.81%	61.49%	2.70%
Algeria	42.41%	37.59%	20.00%
Australia	56.35%	34.53%	9.12%
Austria	80.17%	14.93%	4.90%
Azerbaijan	39.06%	53.86%	7.08%
Bahrain	25.00%	71.88%	3.12%
Belgium	69.85%	21.07%	9.09%
Bosnia and Herzegovina	52.59%	46.67%	0.74%
Bulgaria	35.31%	58.42%	6.27%
Canada	33.35%	51.62%	15.02%
China	25.27%	68.86%	5.86%
Czech Republic	19.88%	73.49%	6.63%
Denmark	62.65%	27.01%	10.33%
Egypt	48.59%	49.15%	2.26%
Finland	28.89%	43.70%	27.41%
France	66.02%	15.27%	18.71%
Georgia	46.51%	48.37%	5.12%
Germany	68.63%	23.74%	7.63%

Country	Erdoğan	İhsanoğlu	Demirtaş
Greece	43.95%	44.44%	11.60%
Hungary	52.57%	35.29%	12.13%
Iran	47.89%	49.30%	2.82%
Ireland	24.56%	64.91%	10.53%
Israel	31.87%	58.24%	9.89%
Italy	45.82%	45.22%	8.96%
Japan	46.01%	47.85%	6.13%
Jordan	78.90%	20.45%	0.65%
Kazakhstan	36.50%	56.70%	6.80%
Kosovo	56.65%	37.64%	5.70%
Kuwait	31.47%	66.81%	1.72%
Kyrgyzstan	56.65%	37.64%	5.70%
Lebanon	85.93%	14.07%	0.00%
Macedonia	45.08%	54.10%	0.82%
Netherlands	77.95%	18.09%	3.96%
New Zealand	15.91%	72.73%	11.36%
Northern Cyprus	54.85%	37.02%	8.12%
Norway	50.99%	33.44%	15.56%

Country	Erdoğan	İhsanoğlu	Demirtaş
Oman	29.03%	69.35%	1.61%
Poland	32.17%	50.00%	17.83%
Qatar	24.51%	61.76%	13.73%
Romania	38.27%	42.65%	19.08%
Russia	28.74%	64.10%	7.16%
Saudi Arabia	80.55%	18.38%	1.07%
South Africa	33.33%	66.06%	0.61%
Spain	11.00%	76.98%	12.03%
Sudan	53.94%	44.24%	1.82%
Sweden	51.11%	32.64%	16.25%
Switzerland	39.62%	31.89%	28.49%
Tunisia	32.14%	61.90%	5.95%
Turkmenistan	39.57%	55.00%	5.43%
Ukraine	48.17%	44.04%	7.80%
United Arab Emirates	18.75%	75.47%	5.78%
United Kingdom	23.53%	49.72%	26.74%
United States of America	15.91%	77.88%	6.21%
Uzbekistan	65.57%	32.79%	1.64%

A summary of the numbers of countries won by each candidate is shown below.

Candidate	Countries with pluralities (<50%)	Countries with majorities (>50%)	Combined	Proportion
Recep Tayyip Erdoğan	4	19	23	42.59%
Ekmeleddin Mehmet İhsanoğlu	8	23	31	57.41%
Selahattin Demirtaş	0	0	0	0.00%
Total	12	42	54	100.00%

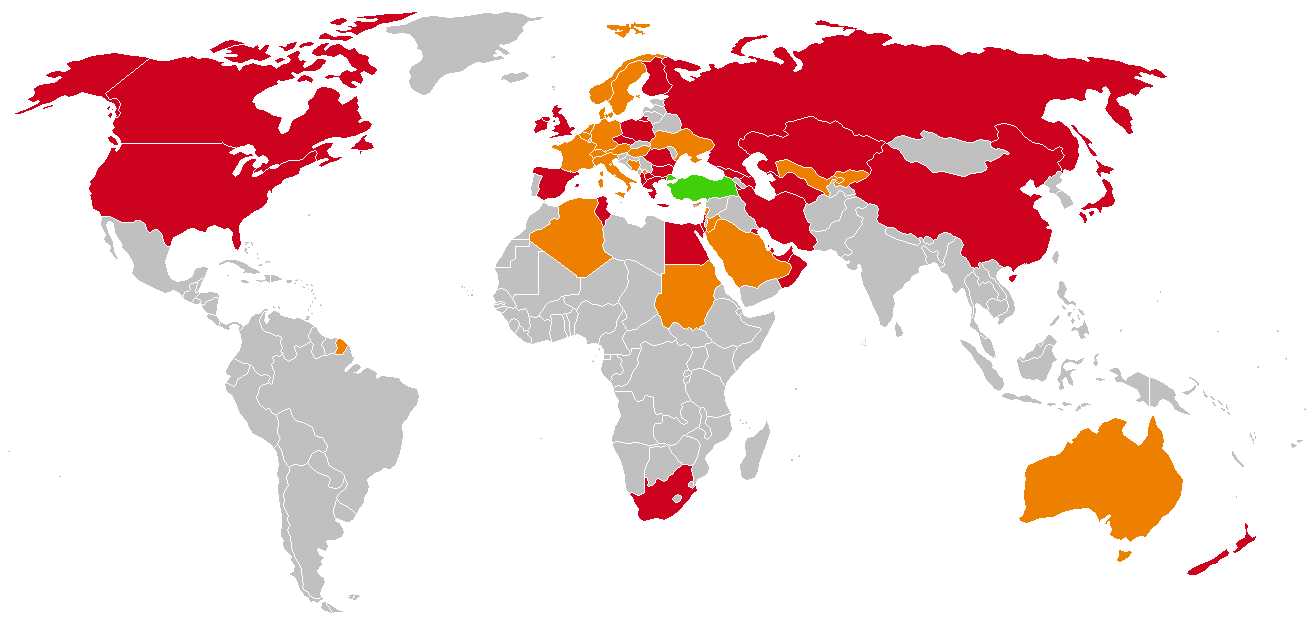
Countries won by Recep Tayyip Erdoğan Countries won by Ekmeleddin İhsanoğlu

== See also ==
- Turkic history
- Turkic peoples
- Turkish population
- Uyghurs
