= List of ambassadors of Turkey to New Zealand =

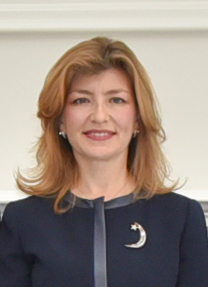
Ömür Ünsay in 2021

The ambassador of Turkey to New Zealand is the official representative of the president and the government of the Republic of Turkey to the prime minister and government of New Zealand.

== List of ambassadors ==
Ambassador	Term start	Term end	Ref
Teoman Sürenkök	31 January 1992	30 October 1995	
Halit Güvener	1 November 1995	30 March 1998	
Ahmet H. Ermişoğlu	1 April 1998	15 September 2001	
Ali Ünal Maraşlı	1 October 2001	31 March 2004	
M. Uğur Ergun	1 June 2005	25 June 2008	
Mehmet Taşer	12 May 2009	16 December 2010	
Ali Yakıtal	15 January 2011	16 May 2012	
Damla Yeşim Say	4 June 2012	15 November 2016	
Ahmet Ergin	1 December 2016	15 March 2021	
Ömür Ünsay	26 March 2021	Present	

== See also ==
- New Zealand–Turkey relations
