= New Zealand–Turkey relations =

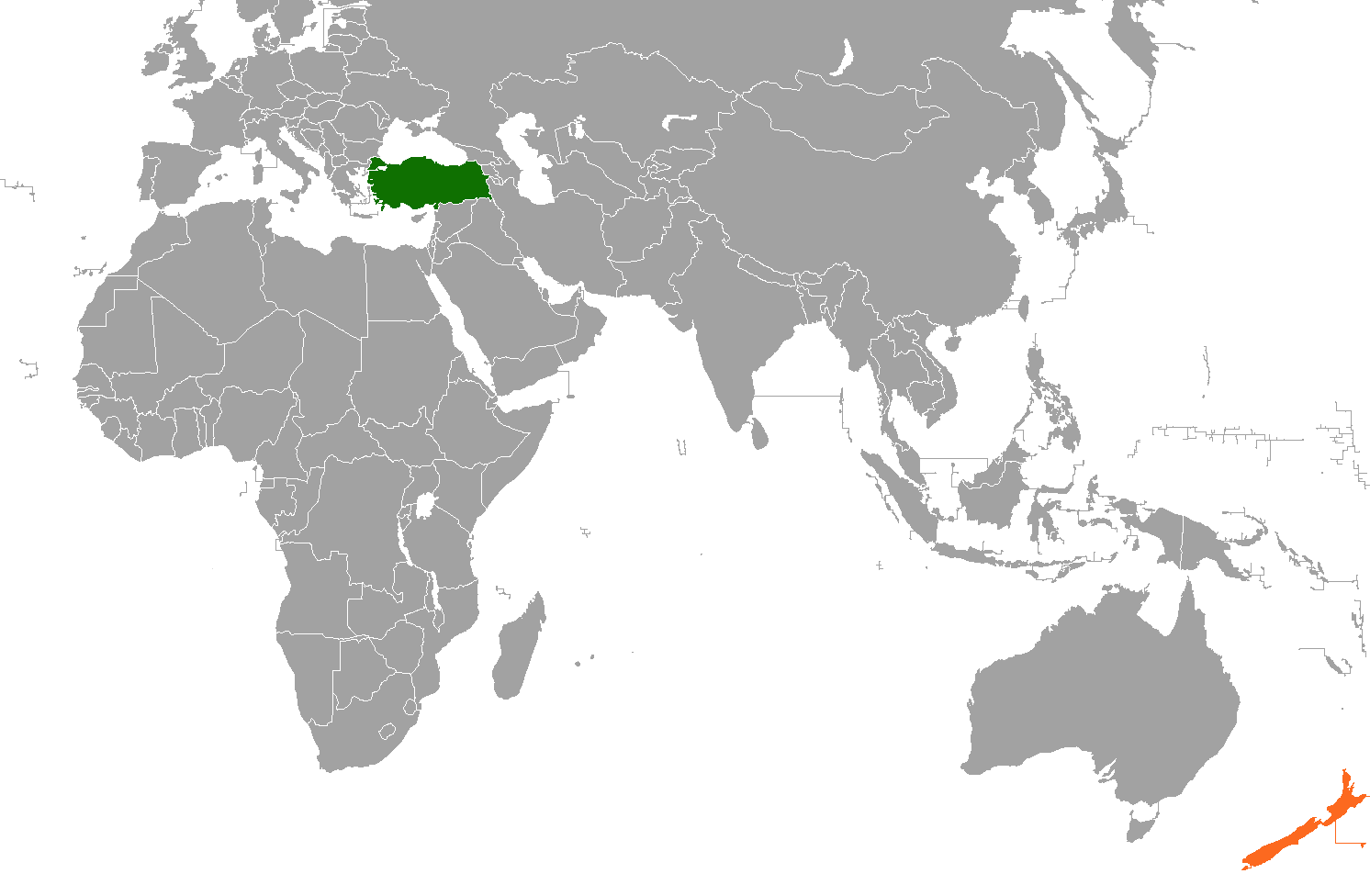

- Turkey: New Zealand

New Zealand–Turkey relations are the bilateral relationship between New Zealand and the Republic of Türkiye. New Zealand and Turkey formalised diplomatic relations between both countries in 1979 but had unofficial forms of contact with each other prior to 1979. Both New Zealand and Turkey are members of numerous organisations such as the OECD, World Trade Organization, United Nations and World Health Organization. New Zealand has an embassy in Ankara and Turkey has an embassy in Wellington.

== Background ==
New Zealand's historical relationship with Turkey is highly connected to the British relationship with Turkey and the Ottoman Empire. New Zealand's first relationship with Turkey is centred around World War I and the Gallipoli campaign. The Ottoman Empire, the predecessor state to the modern state of Turkey, and the British Empire were on opposing sides. The British were on the side of the Allies of World War I and the Ottoman Empire was on the side of the Central Powers. New Zealand being a part of the British Empire was on the side of the Allied Powers.

The allied powers opened an offensive front in Gallipoli, in 1915. The main combatants on the side of the allies were the British, French, and Australian and New Zealand Army Corps (ANZACs). On the side of the Central Powers were the Ottoman Empire supported by the German Empire and Austria-Hungary. In the Gallipoli campaign the number of casualties and losses for the allies totalled 141,547 where 2,779 New Zealanders were killed and 5,212 were wounded and on the Ottoman side there 251,309 casualties and losses where 86,692 were killed.

In World War II Turkey was a neutral power until the later stages of the war. Turkey declared war against Nazi Germany and Empire of Japan in 1945.

New Zealand declared war against Germany in 1939 and Japan in 1941. Both Turkey and New Zealand were on the same side, after 1945. Post WW2 the United Nations was founded with both Turkey New Zealand as founding members.

== History ==
In January 1992 Turkey opened an embassy in Wellington, with New Zealand opening an embassy in Ankara in 1993.

A memorial to Mustafa Kemal Atatürk, the commander of the Turkish forces at Gallipoli who went on to become the founder of modern Turkey, is sited at Tarakina Bay overlooking the entrance to Wellington harbour.

On 23 October 2021, Turkish President Recep Tayyip Erdoğan declared the New Zealand Ambassador Wendy Hinton "persona non grata" after she joined the ambassadors of nine other Western countries including the United States, Germany, Canada, Denmark, Finland, France, the Netherlands, Norway and Sweden in calling for the release of the imprisoned businessman and philanthropist Osman Kavala. On 25 October, Erdogan backtracked on his initial threats to expel the ten ambassadors following criticism from opposition parties, stating that the diplomats had fulfilled their commitment to Article 41 of the Vienna Convention on Diplomatic Relations and that they would be more careful in their future statements.

In 2023, Following the 2023 Turkey-Syria earthquakes in which a 7.8 magnitude earthquake struck Turkey and Syria, resulting in thousands of casualties and widespread damage, the New Zealand government responded by committing $1.5 million in humanitarian support to assist in the relief efforts. The financial assistance was given to the International Federation of Red Cross and Red Crescent Societies, would support the delivery of essential relief items such as food, medical aid, and psychological support to affected individuals in both countries. The government indicated that further support may be provided as needed. The earthquake prompted the Ministry of Foreign Affairs to advise all New Zealanders in Turkey to follow the advice of local authorities and register their details on the SafeTravel website. Prime Minister Chris Hipkins also expressed condolences to those affected by the disaster and noted that New Zealand, having experienced earthquakes before, had a special connection with those affected.

== Diplomatic Relationship ==
New Zealand and Turkey has had a range of diplomatic relations since the start of official diplomatic relations in 1979. New Zealand and Turkey have a range of diplomatic relations including foreign policy, military relations, and economic relations.

New Zealand is a part of numerous international organisations such as the United Nations (UN), The World Trade Organisation (WTO), World Bank, International Monetary Fund (IMF), OECD, Asian Development Bank, and Asia-Pacific Economic Cooperation (APEC). The organisations that New Zealand is part of tend to be regionally in Asia or the Pacific Islands or large international organisations such as the IMF, UN, and the World Bank.

Turkey is also part of numerous international organisations such as the United Nations (UN), The World Trade Organization (WTO), the World Health Organization (WHO), The International Monetary Fund (IMF), the World bank, Organisation of Islamic Cooperation, The Organisation for Economic Cooperation and Development (OECD) and Organization for Security and Co-operation in Europe. The organisations that Turkey tend of be part of is either cultural organisations, regional organisations, or large international organisations such as the World Bank.

Turkey and New Zealand also has a significant trade and economic relationship. The trade relationship is currently worth around 255 million (NZD). The trade volume has reduced since its height in 2019. In 2019 the trade relationship was worth around 367 million (NZD). Globally the COVID-19 pandemic has impacted the trading relationship globally including the trade relationship between New Zealand and Turkey.

Despite Turkey and the West being allies due to NATO there has been tension in the relationship. New Zealand being close partners with NATO countries is align in this foreign policy outlook. New Zealand has also mentioned issues with Turkey's rule of law, and in return Turkey has stated that their judiciary system is independent.

== Contemporary Relationship ==
New Zealand and Turkey relations encompass a range of different sectors from economic, military, foreign relations and academic. New Zealand and Turkey are both countries which take part in a range of different international organisations such as the WTO, WHO and UN.

=== Educational ===
There is a strong ongoing relationship between New Zealand and Turkey in the realm of educational and academic exchange. There is ongoing exchange programs between New Zealand and Turkey such as the University of Otago exchange program with the Middle East Technical University.

=== War on Terror ===
In the September 11 attacks and the global war on terror. Both New Zealand and Turkey have been active participants in the global war on terror. New Zealand and Turkey both participated in the International Security Assistance Force. The International Security Assistance Force (ISAF) was a multinational military mission in Afghanistan from 2001 to 2014. It was established by United Nations Security Council Resolution 1386 which authorised the establishment of the International Security Assistance Force (ISAF) to assist the Afghan Interim Administration. ISAF's primary goal was to train the Afghan National Security Forces (ANSF) and assist Afghanistan in rebuilding key government institutions. It later took part in the war in Afghanistan against the Taliban insurgency.

==== Iraq War ====
On 1 March 2003, The Turkish parliament rejected being an active member of the US-led coalition forces in Iraq. This decision from the Grand National Assembly of Turkey was seen as a reaction against the unilateral action of United States and a desire to keep Turkey away from the Iraq war. Turkey not being an active participant in the Iraq War came at a cost of Kurdish leaders of Iraq gaining more power due to allying with the US during the war.

New Zealand contributed a small engineering and support force to assist in post-war reconstruction and provision of humanitarian aid. New Zealand staff officers are still working with coalition forces to this day. New Zealand and some long-standing US allies which include France and Germany opposed the Invasion of Iraq. These leaders argued that there was no evidence of weapons of mass destruction in Iraq and that invading the country was not justified. Chemical Warheads, shells and aviation bombs were discovered during the Iraq War but these were built earlier in Saddam rule prior to the 1991 Gulf War.

=== Covid-19 ===
Coronavirus disease 2019 (COVID-19) is a contagious disease caused by the severe acute respiratory syndrome coronavirus 2 (SARS-CoV-2). The disease has spread worldwide leading to an ongoing global pandemic.

Countries have taken stances to minimise the impact of COVID-19 on their countries. In the COVID-19 pandemic both Turkey and New Zealand took similar responses. New Zealand and Turkey initiated and restricted international travel initially just from China where it was first identified but then gradually expanded to numerous countries such as Italy and America. New Zealand and Turkey also conducted lockdowns and restrictions to reduce community spread. In this pandemic both countries also underwent struggles such as shortages of toilet paper and masks.

The introduction of new COVID-19 variants such as SARS-CoV-2 Delta variant and SARS-CoV-2 Omicron variant has introduced new restrictions in both New Zealand and Turkey despite this however COVID-19 cases are increasing in both countries due to the omicron variant.

Turkey and New Zealand both have a high vaccination rates with both Turkey and New Zealand having more than half their population being fully vaccination from COVID-19.

== Visits ==
=== Head of State ===
Dates	Head of State
April 1990	Governor-General, Sir Paul Reeves
August 1991	President of Turkey, Turgut Özal
21–28 April 1998	Governor-General, Sir Michael Hardie Boys
21 April - 1 May 2003	Governor-General, Dame Silvia Cartwright
April 2009	Governor-General, Sir Anand Satyanand
April 2014	Governor-General, Sir Jerry Mateparae
August 2015	Governor-General, Sir Jerry Mateparae
April 2018	Governor-General, Dame Patsy Reddy

=== Prime minister ===
Dates	Prime Minister
23–27 April 2005	Prime Minister, Helen Clark
3–7 December 2005	Prime Minister, Recep Tayyip Erdoğan
22–26 April 2010	Prime Minister, John Key
22–26 April 2015	Prime Minister, John Key

=== Minister of Foreign Affairs ===
Dates	Minister
1985	Vahit Melih Halefoğlu
12–15 September 1992	Don McKinnon
27 February–2 March 1994	Hikmet Çetin
16–19 April 1995	Donald Charles McKinnon
23–25 April 2001	Phil Goff
April 2007	Winston Peters
April 2009	Winston Peters
7–9 March 2013	Murray McCully
May 2016	Murray McCully
March 2019	Mevlüt Çavuşoğlu
March 2019	Winston Peters
April 2024	Winston Peters

== Resident diplomatic missions ==
- New Zealand has an embassy in Ankara.
- Turkey has an embassy in Wellington.

== See also ==
- Foreign relations of Turkey
- Foreign relations of New Zealand
- Turks in New Zealand
- List of ambassadors of Turkey to New Zealand
