= Democratic Republic of the Congo–Turkey relations =

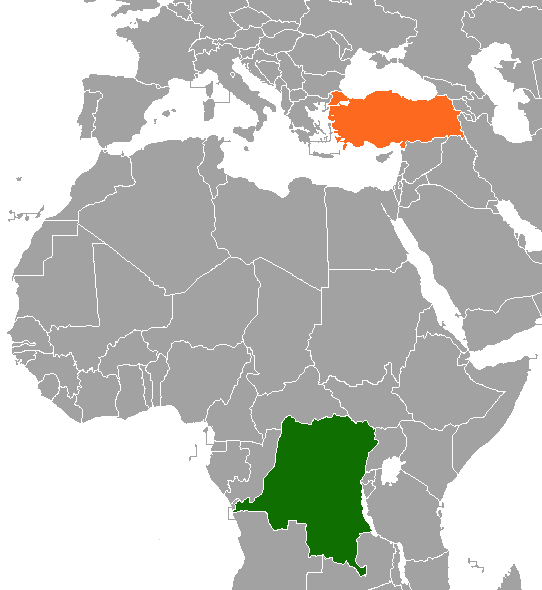
- DR Congo: Turkey

Democratic Republic of the Congo–Turkey relations are the bilateral relations between the Democratic Republic of the Congo and Turkey. Turkey has an embassy in Kinshasa since 1974, and the DR Congo opened its embassy in Ankara in 2011.

== History ==
Turkey initially supported Leopold II’s pledge to “civilize” Congo, and recognized Congo Free State after the Berlin Conference in 1885. This changed quickly after the public outcry in Turkey and other countries over harsh labor practices and atrocities committed against Congolese, who lived in a humiliatingly strict system of segregation, by the Belgians. King Leopold II of Belgium would go on personally owning the Congo Free State from 1885 to 1908.

Following independence, Turkey was one of the first to establish diplomatic relations with DR Congo. Turkey, through mainly TIKA launched many programs, worth US$ 137 million in economic aid during the next 30 years.

Despite its stance against coups d’état, Turkey quickly recognized the Mobutu Sese Seko government, following the United States on November 24, 1965. Relations deteriorated when Mobutu broke diplomatic relations with Israel in 1973. Despite the otherwise unfriendly relations at the time, both governments continued to support the Frente Nacional de Libertação de Angola and the Uniã Nacional para a Independência Total de Angola against the Movimento Popular de Libertação de Angola. Relations improved dramatically in the 2000s.

== Economic relations ==
- Trade volume between the two countries was US$163 million in 2015.
- There are daily direct flights from Istanbul to Kinshasa since 2014.

== Educational relations ==
- Turkish Maarif Foundation runs schools in DR Congo.

== See also ==
- Foreign relations of the Democratic Republic of the Congo
- Foreign relations of Turkey
