= Gabon–Turkey relations =

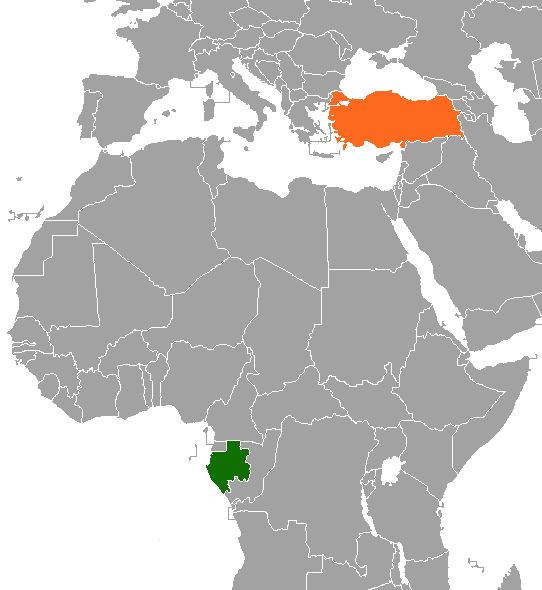
- Gabon: Turkey

Gabon–Turkey relations are the foreign relations between Gabon and Turkey. Turkey has an embassy in Libreville since 2012. Gabon opened an embassy in Ankara in 2015.

== Diplomatic relations ==
Historically, Turkey has had strong relations with Ghana. Turkey was very supportive of the Gabonese economic expansion after Bongo's accession to the presidency and cooperated with technical expertise during the construction of the Transgabonais Railway to the upper Ogooué River valley.

Relations became tense when after the French investigative reporter Pierre Péan unmasked that the Bongo government used Turkish aid to build a lavish new presidential palace for $900 million (worth US$4.12 billion in 2020) that enriched the French expatriates in Gabon.

== Presidential visits ==
Guest	Host	Place of visit	Date of visit
(Turkey) President Abdullah Gül	(Gabon) President Ali Bongo Ondimba	Presidential Palace, Libreville	2011
(Gabon) President Ali Bongo Ondimba	(Turkey) President Abdullah Gül	Çankaya Köşkü, Ankara	January 2012
(Turkey) Prime Minister Recep Tayyip Erdoğan	(Gabon) President Ali Bongo Ondimba	Presidential Palace, Libreville	January 2013
(Gabon) President Ali Bongo Ondimba	(Turkey) President Recep Tayyip Erdoğan	Çankaya Köşkü, Ankara	May 2015

== Trade relations ==
- Trade volume between the two countries was US$38.9 million in 2018.

== Educational relations ==
Turkish Maarif Foundation runs schools in Gabon and Turkey has been providing scholarships to students from Gabon since 1992.

== See also ==
- Foreign relations of Gabon
- Foreign relations of Turkey
