= Republic of the Congo–Turkey relations =

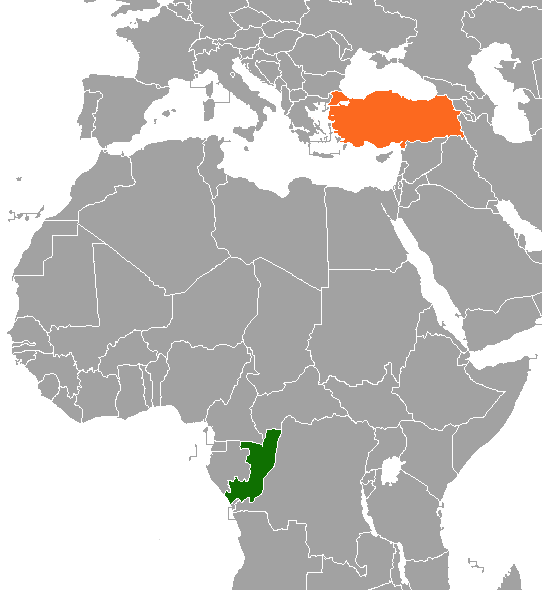
- Congo: Turkey

Republic of the Congo–Turkey relations are foreign relations between the Republic of the Congo and Turkey. Turkey has an embassy in Brazzaville since 2014. Congo opened an embassy in Ankara in 2013.

== Diplomatic relations ==
Following independence, Turkey was one of the first to establish diplomatic relations with Congo. Turkey, through mainly TIKA launched many programs, worth US$ 57 million in economic aid during the next 30 years.

Following the visit by President Denis Sassou Nguesso, bilateral relations became much closer.

== Presidential visits ==
| Guest | Host | Place of visit | Date of visit |
|---|---|---|---|
| (Republic of the Congo) President Denis Sassou Nguesso | (Turkey) President Recep Tayyip Erdoğan | Çankaya Köşkü, Ankara | November 3, 2012 |

== Economic relations ==
- Trade volume between the two countries was US$57.25 million in 2018 (Turkish exports/imports: US$55.79/1.47 million).
- There are direct flights from Istanbul to Point-Noire since July 30, 2019.

== Educational relations ==
- Turkish Maarif Foundation runs schools in Congo.

== See also ==
- Foreign relations of the Republic of the Congo
- Foreign relations of Turkey
