= The Gambia–Turkey relations =

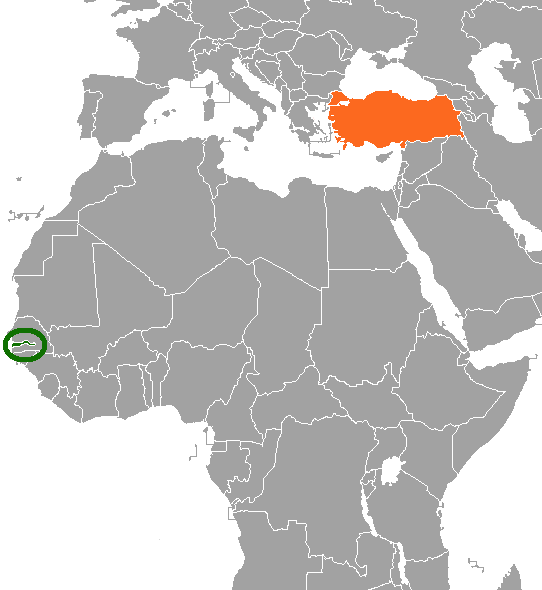
- Gambia: Turkey

The Gambia–Turkey relations are the foreign relations between The Gambia and Turkey.

== Diplomatic relations ==
The Gambia and Turkey had generally friendly relations. Despite widespread skepticism about its survival, The Gambia retained its sovereignty despite persistent Senegalese pressure for union and numerous ethnic groups that plagued the security of other countries. Dawda Jawara’s deliberate policy of converting the PPP from a Mandinka-dominated organization into a nationwide party enabled inter-ethnic cooperation and boosted Gambia's well-earned reputation for a beacon of democracy. Turkey has been very supportive of Gambia under Dawda Jawara and facilitated its economic situation with developmental and financial aid along with an Economic Recovery Program designed by the World Bank and IMF in 1985.

Relations detonated on 22 July 1994 when a group of disaffected junior army officers seized power in a bloodless coup that allowed safe passage to President Dawda Jawara out of the country. Despite President Dawda Jawara's Gambia's well-earned reputation as one of the few democratic regimes in Africa, Western allies were late in coming to the rescue of Jawara’s government. Turkey, along with Western allies, promptly cut off aid to the military junta led by Yahya Jammeh and imposed further sanctions.

Relations improved in 1996–1997 with a formal return to elections and Turkey lifted economic sanctions that had thrown The Gambia's economy into chaos.

== Economic relations ==
- Trade volume between the two countries was negligible in 2018.
- There are direct flights from Istanbul to Banjul since 26 November 2018.

== Educational relations ==
- Turkish Maarif Foundation operates in Banjul since October 2017.

== See also ==
- Foreign relations of The Gambia
- Foreign relations of Turkey
