= Foreign relations of Turkey =

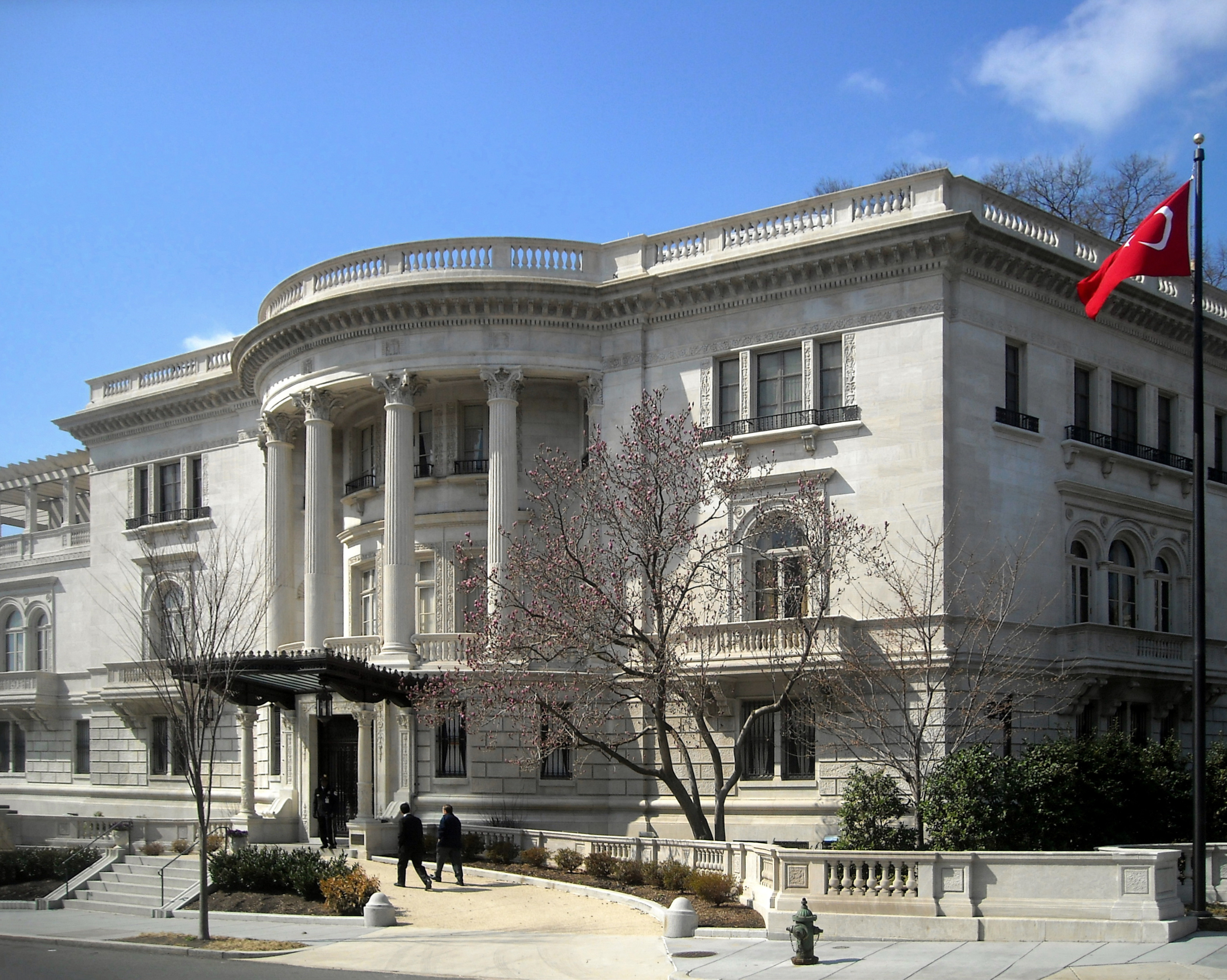
Turkish ambassador's residence in Embassy of Turkey, Washington, D.C.

Foreign relations of Turkey refers to the diplomatic and trade ties between Turkey and other nations. As of December 2024, Turkey maintains diplomatic relations with 189 member states of the United Nations.

Prior to declaring war against the Axis powers on February 23, 1945, Turkey's primary ally had been the United States, with both countries aiming to contain Soviet expansion. In support of the United Nations, Turkey contributed personnel to the Korean War in 1950 and joined NATO in 1952.

Turkey's relations with the Arab World and Iran have been strained due to its recognition of Israel in 1949 and its alliance with Israel during the Israeli-Palestinian conflict. This subsequently led to overt Syrian support for Palestinian and Armenian militant operations against Turkish diplomats abroad until 1990. Since the ascension of the AKP government in 2002, Turkey's regional influence has expanded based on various doctrines ("strategic depth doctrine", "blue homeland") in what has been characterized by multiple scholars as imperialist or Neo-Ottoman.

As of 2026 Turkey's foreign policy is marked by strategic autonomy in an era of multipolarity. Turkey in a NATO member, and at the same time maintains beneficial strategic relation with the Russian-Chinese axis.

== History ==
Historically, the foreign relations of the Ottoman Empire and later Turkey balanced regional and global powers against one another, forming alliances that best protected the interests of the incumbent regime. The Soviet Union played a major role in supplying weapons and financing Mustafa Kemal Atatürk's faction during the Turkish War of Independence, but Turkey followed a course of relative international isolation during the period of Atatürk's reforms in the 1920s and 1930s. International conferences gave Turkey full control of the strategic straits linking the Black Sea and the Mediterranean through the Treaty of Lausanne in 1923 and the Montreux Convention of 1936.

In the late 1930s, Nazi Germany made a major effort to promote anti-Soviet propaganda in Turkey. In response, Britain and France negotiated a tripartite treaty with Turkey in 1939 in which they gave Turkey a line of credit to purchase war materials from the West and a loan to facilitate the purchase of commodities. After threats from Germany and the Soviet Union, Turkey maintained neutrality. It sold chrome—an important war material—to both sides, but by 1944, as the eventuality of German defeat grew more evident, chrome sales to Germany halted.

=== After 1945 ===
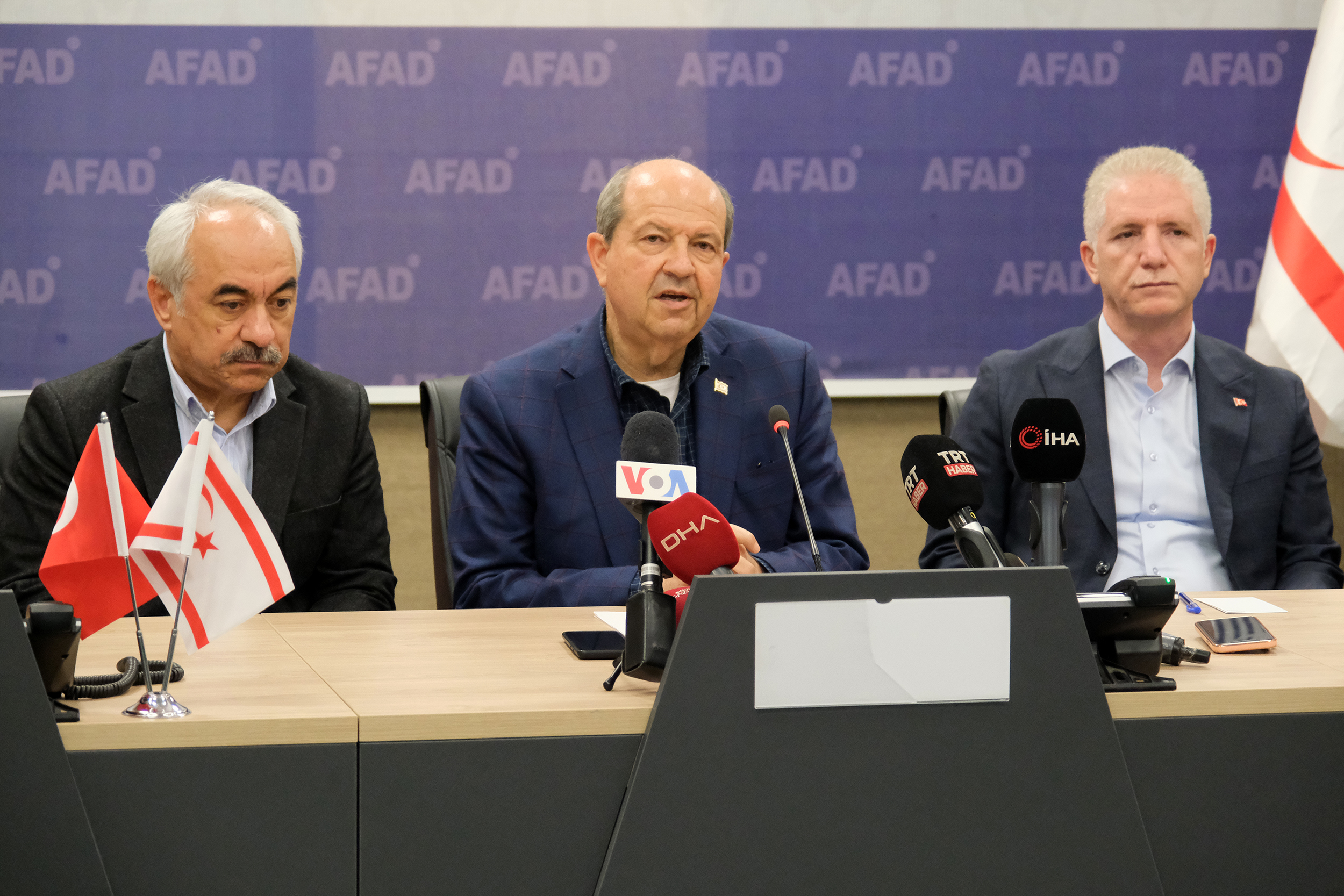
Northern Cyprus has been occupied by Turkey since 1974.

Turkey became one of the early members of the Council of Europe in 1950. Turkey applied for full membership of the EEC in 1987, joined the European Union Customs Union in 1995, and started accession negotiations with the European Union in 2005. In a non-binding vote on 13 March 2019, the European Parliament called on the EU governments to suspend EU accession talks with Turkey, citing violations of human rights and the rule of law. The negotiations, which have been effectively on hold since 2018, remain active as of 2025.

According to the United States government, the other defining aspect of Turkey's foreign policy has been the country's long-standing strategic alliance with the United States. The Truman Doctrine in 1947 enunciated American intentions to guarantee the security of Turkey and Greece during the Cold War, and resulted in large-scale U.S. military and economic support to the countries. In 1948, both Turkey and Greece were included in the Marshall Plan and the OEEC for rebuilding European economies.

Turkey joined NATO in 1952, strengthening its bilateral ties with the United States. In the following decades, Turkey benefited from American political, economic, and diplomatic support—particularly on critical issues such as its longstanding bid for European Union membership. In the post–Cold War era, Turkey's geostrategic importance shifted towards its proximity to the Middle East, the Caucasus, and the Balkans.

The independence of the Turkic states of the Soviet Union in 1991, with which Turkey shares a common cultural, historic and linguistic heritage, allowed Turkey to extend its economic and political relations deep into Central Asia. The International Organization of Turkic Culture (TURKSOY) was established in 1993, and the Organization of Turkic States (OTS) was established in 2009. The Baku–Tbilisi–Ceyhan pipeline, a multi-billion-dollar oil and natural gas pipeline that extends from Baku in Azerbaijan to the port of Ceyhan in Turkey, is a part of Turkey's foreign policy goal to become an energy conduit from the Caspian Sea basin to Europe. Turkey sealed its land border with Armenia in a gesture of support to Azerbaijan (a Turkic state in the Caucasus region) during the First (1993) and Second (2020) Nagorno-Karabakh Wars. The border remains closed as of 2025, opening only twice to allow aid to pass through. In 2022, Armenia and Turkey started diplomatic talks to normalize the relationship between the two countries. Turkey and Armenia have also restarted commercial flights between the two countries.

Under the AKP government (2002–present), Turkey's economy has expanded rapidly and the country's regional influence has expanded based on a "strategic depth doctrine", in what has been characterized as being imperialist or Neo-Ottoman. Debate on Turkey's foreign relations is controversial both within Turkey and internationally. In the West, there exists a divide between those who are worried about Turkey's perceived movement away from the West toward a less democratic, more Islamic or more pro-Russian and pro-Chinese orientation and those who do not see Turkey's changing political structure, growing regional power, and diversification of relations with countries such as Russia as a threat.

=== Relations with the European Union ===
On 14 April 1987, Turkey applied for membership to the European Economic Community (now the European Union). On 12 December 1999, at the Helsinki Summit, the European Council gives Turkey the status of candidate country for EU membership, following the Commission's recommendation in its second Regular Report on Turkey. On 3 August 2002, The Turkish parliament abolished the death penalty to pave the way for the start of EU accession negotiations. On 16 December 2004, the European Council decides to start accession negotiations for Turkey to become a full member of the European Union. On 3 October 2005, the European Union decided to officially open accession negotiations with Turkey. On 24 November 2016, the European Parliament votes to suspend accession negotiations with Turkey over human rights and rule of law concerns. On 25 April 2017, the Parliamentary Assembly of the Council of Europe (PACE) unanimously adopted a call to place Turkey back under monitoring due to setbacks in democracy, human rights, the rule of law, freedom of expression, and judicial independence. Turkey last officially exited the monitoring process in 2004 when it began accession negotiations with the European Union. On 26 June 2018, the EU's General Affairs Council stated that "the Council notes that Turkey has been moving further away from the European Union. Turkey's accession negotiations have therefore effectively come to a standstill and no further chapters can be considered for opening or closing and no further work towards the modernisation of the EU-Turkey Customs Union is foreseen." The Council added that it is "especially concerned about the continuing and deeply worrying backsliding on the rule of law and on fundamental rights including the freedom of expression." On 19 May 2021, the European Parliament unanimously accepted the call for the suspension of accession negotiations between the European Union and Turkey. While Turkey officially has diplomatic relations with 26 EU member states, it does not have diplomatic relations with 1 EU member state (Cyprus).

== Diplomatic relations ==
Despite being one of the first countries to recognize Armenia's independence, Turkey has never established formal diplomatic relations with it. Turkey formerly maintained diplomatic relations with Cyprus and Taiwan.

List of countries with which Turkey maintains diplomatic relations:

| # | Country | Date |
|---|---|---|
| 1 | Albania | 15 December 1923 |
| 2 | United Kingdom | 2 February 1924 |
| 3 | Italy | 1 March 1924 |
| 4 | Romania | 20 April 1924 |
| 5 | Hungary | 7 May 1924 |
| 6 | Japan | 6 August 1924 |
| 7 | Spain | 27 September 1924 |
| 8 | France | 7 October 1924 |
| 9 | Czech Republic | 11 October 1924 |
| 10 | Russia | 8 November 1924 |
| 11 | Austria | 11 November 1924 |
| 12 | Finland | 9 December 1924 |
| 13 | Denmark | 26 January 1925 |
| 14 | Belgium | 10 February 1925 |
| 15 | Switzerland | 23 March 1925 |
| 16 | Greece | 1 April 1925 |
| 17 | Egypt | 8 May 1925 |
| 18 | Sweden | 1 August 1925 |
| 19 | Netherlands | 5 August 1925 |
| 20 | Chile | 30 January 1926 |
| 21 | Afghanistan | 24 February 1926 |
| 22 | Portugal | 28 May 1926 |
| 23 | Argentina | 29 June 1926 |
| 24 | Serbia | 21 July 1926 |
| 25 | Bulgaria | 30 October 1926 |
| 26 | United States | 17 February 1927 |
| 27 | Brazil | 8 September 1927 |
| 28 | Iraq | 16 January 1928 |
| 29 | Mexico | 12 July 1928 |
| 30 | Iran | 21 October 1928 |
| 31 | Poland | 25 October 1928 |
| 32 | Saudi Arabia | 3 August 1929 |
| 33 | Norway | 8 October 1930 |
| 34 | Uruguay | 8 December 1933 |
| 35 | Canada | 25 November 1943 |
| 36 | Yemen | 4 March 1946 |
| 37 | Lebanon | 8 March 1946 |
| 38 | Syria | 8 March 1946 |
| 39 | Luxembourg | 10 July 1946 |
| 40 | Jordan | 31 March 1947 |
| 41 | India | 15 August 1947 |
| 42 | Pakistan | 30 November 1947 |
| 43 | Sri Lanka | 4 February 1948 |
| 44 | Philippines | 13 June 1949 |
| 45 | Israel | 10 January 1950 |
| 46 | Indonesia | 12 February 1950 |
| 47 | Bolivia | 21 September 1950 |
| 48 | Costa Rica | 21 September 1950 |
| 49 | Dominican Republic | 21 September 1950 |
| 50 | Ecuador | 21 September 1950 |
| 51 | El Salvador | 21 September 1950 |
| 52 | Honduras | 21 September 1950 |
| 53 | Nicaragua | 21 September 1950 |
| 54 | Panama | 21 September 1950 |
| 55 | Peru | 21 September 1950 |
| 56 | Venezuela | 21 September 1950 |
| 57 | Ireland | 15 March 1951 |
| 58 | Germany | 21 June 1952 |
| 59 | Cuba | 25 November 1952 |
| 60 | Libya | 30 December 1952 |
| 61 | Paraguay | 11 September 1953 |
| 62 | Morocco | 17 April 1956 |
| 63 | South Korea | 8 March 1957 |
| 64 | Sudan | 20 July 1957 |
| 65 | Tunisia | 22 July 1957 |
| 66 | Iceland | 25 November 1957 |
| 67 | Ethiopia | 23 December 1957 |
| 68 | Thailand | 12 May 1958 |
| 69 | Laos | 20 June 1958 |
| 70 | Liberia | 1 August 1958 |
| 71 | Myanmar | 2 September 1958 |
| 72 | Guatemala | 16 September 1958 |
| 73 | Ghana | 30 October 1958 |
| 74 | Haiti | 14 November 1958 |
| 75 | Colombia | 10 April 1959 |
| — | Holy See | 25 January 1960 |
| — | Cyprus (suspended) | 16 August 1960 |
| 76 | Nigeria | 9 November 1960 |
| 77 | Cameroon | 11 October 1962 |
| 78 | Guinea | 11 October 1962 |
| 79 | Nepal | 15 November 1962 |
| 80 | Togo | 6 December 1962 |
| 81 | Madagascar | 30 January 1963 |
| 82 | Gabon | 1 February 1963 |
| 83 | Mali | 17 April 1963 |
| 84 | Algeria | 30 June 1963 |
| 85 | Tanzania | 5 July 1963 |
| 86 | Senegal | 17 October 1963 |
| 87 | Kuwait | 10 January 1964 |
| 88 | Malaysia | 17 June 1964 |
| 89 | Ivory Coast | 14 July 1964 |
| 90 | Somalia | 13 December 1965 |
| 91 | Gambia | 1965 |
| 92 | Australia | 28 February 1967 |
| 93 | Niger | 30 March 1967 |
| 94 | Malta | 10 October 1967 |
| 95 | Kenya | 30 March 1968 |
| 96 | Singapore | 12 February 1969 |
| 97 | Cambodia | 3 May 1969 |
| 98 | Mongolia | 24 June 1969 |
| 99 | Malawi | 4 August 1969 |
| 100 | Uganda | 18 September 1969 |
| 101 | Chad | 27 January 1970 |
| 102 | Burkina Faso | 6 April 1970 |
| 103 | Mauritania | 14 April 1970 |
| 104 | Sierra Leone | 15 February 1971 |
| 105 | Zambia | 25 February 1971 |
| 106 | Jamaica | 30 March 1971 |
| 107 | China | 4 August 1971 |
| 108 | Trinidad and Tobago | 22 May 1972 |
| 109 | Barbados | 20 September 1972 |
| 110 | Qatar | 20 March 1973 |
| 111 | United Arab Emirates | 21 March 1973 |
| 112 | Bahrain | 12 April 1973 |
| 113 | Guyana | 2 May 1973 |
| 114 | Oman | 18 June 1973 |
| 115 | Bangladesh | 22 February 1974 |
| 116 | Benin | 29 March 1974 |
| 117 | Bahamas | 5 November 1974 |
| 118 | Grenada | 8 May 1975 |
| 119 | Democratic Republic of the Congo | 22 October 1975 |
| 120 | Fiji | 17 November 1975 |
| 121 | Guinea-Bissau | 1975 |
| 122 | Tonga | 26 January 1976 |
| 123 | Nauru | 27 April 1976 |
| 124 | Suriname | 29 June 1976 |
| 125 | Mauritius | 18 October 1976 |
| 126 | Vietnam | 7 June 1978 |
| 127 | New Zealand | 12 December 1978 |
| 128 | Solomon Islands | 8 March 1979 |
| 129 | Samoa | 12 April 1979 |
| 130 | Maldives | 28 May 1979 |
| 131 | Papua New Guinea | 30 May 1979 |
| 132 | Cape Verde | 24 June 1979 |
| 133 | Djibouti | 25 June 1979 |
| 134 | Tuvalu | 19 July 1979 |
| 135 | Comoros | 22 August 1979 |
| 136 | Central African Republic | 29 January 1980 |
| 137 | Rwanda | 18 February 1980 |
| 138 | Burundi | 30 April 1980 |
| 139 | Angola | 9 July 1980 |
| 140 | Equatorial Guinea | 16 September 1980 |
| 141 | Lesotho | 1980 |
| 142 | Botswana | 20 January 1981 |
| 143 | Eswatini | 20 January 1981 |
| 144 | Mozambique | 20 January 1981 |
| 145 | Republic of the Congo | 9 November 1981 |
| 146 | São Tomé and Príncipe | 1981 |
| 147 | Zimbabwe | 2 July 1982 |
| — | Northern Cyprus | 1983 |
| 148 | Brunei | 27 June 1984 |
| 149 | Belize | November 1987 |
| 150 | Namibia | 27 March 1990 |
| 151 | Lithuania | 3 September 1991 |
| 152 | Latvia | 22 October 1991 |
| 153 | Estonia | 23 October 1991 |
| — | State of Palestine | 19 December 1991 |
| 154 | Azerbaijan | 14 January 1992 |
| 155 | Kyrgyzstan | 29 January 1992 |
| 156 | Tajikistan | 29 January 1992 |
| 157 | Moldova | 3 February 1992 |
| 158 | Turkmenistan | 29 February 1992 |
| 159 | Kazakhstan | 2 March 1992 |
| 160 | Ukraine | 3 March 1992 |
| 161 | Uzbekistan | 4 March 1992 |
| 162 | Belarus | 25 March 1992 |
| 163 | Georgia | 21 May 1992 |
| 164 | Croatia | 26 August 1992 |
| 165 | North Macedonia | 26 August 1992 |
| 166 | Slovenia | 26 August 1992 |
| 167 | Bosnia and Herzegovina | 29 August 1992 |
| 168 | Liechtenstein | 2 October 1992 |
| 169 | South Africa | 12 October 1992 |
| 170 | Slovakia | 1 January 1993 |
| 171 | Eritrea | 19 July 1993 |
| 172 | Seychelles | 22 June 1995 |
| 173 | Vanuatu | 14 July 1995 |
| 174 | Andorra | 8 October 1998 |
| 175 | Antigua and Barbuda | June 1999 |
| 176 | North Korea | 27 June 2001 |
| 177 | Saint Vincent and the Grenadines | 4 April 2002 |
| 178 | Timor-Leste | 20 May 2002 |
| 179 | Saint Lucia | 25 May 2005 |
| 180 | San Marino | 12 October 2005 |
| 181 | Dominica | 13 April 2006 |
| 182 | Palau | 2 May 2006 |
| 183 | Montenegro | 3 July 2006 |
| 184 | Federated States of Micronesia | 6 December 2006 |
| — | Kosovo | 18 February 2008 |
| 185 | Marshall Islands | 11 April 2008 |
| 186 | Monaco | 28 May 2008 |
| 187 | Kiribati | 20 June 2008 |
| — | Cook Islands | 20 October 2008 |
| 188 | Saint Kitts and Nevis | 3 June 2010 |
| 189 | South Sudan | 9 July 2011 |
| 190 | Bhutan | 26 September 2012 |
| — | Niue | 7 June 2014 |

== Bilateral relations ==
=== Multilateral ===
| Organization | Formal Relations Began | Notes |
|---|---|---|
| European Union | September 1963 | See European Union–Turkey relations and Accession of Turkey to the European Union President of the European Commission Ursula von der Leyen and Turkish President Recep Tayyip Erdoğan in Vilnius, July 2023 |
| NATO | February 1952 | See Turkey in NATO |

=== Africa ===
There has been a revival in Turkey's relationships within Africa after 1998, and civil society is the leading factor in this process. Initially, this revival came as a passive attempt, but after 2005 it became an offensive interest in developing relations with the continent. The Turkey–Africa Cooperation Summit in 2008 marked a new stage in Turkey's interest in developing relations with Africa. Turkey, since its involvement in Somalia in 2011, is eager to be considered as a political actor in the continent.

==== Northern Africa ====
| Country/Region | Relations began | Notes | Free trade agreement |
|---|---|---|---|
| Algeria | 30 June 1963 | See Algeria–Turkey relations: Algeria has an embassy in Ankara and a consulate general in Istanbul.; Turkey has an embassy in Algiers.; Trade volume between the two countries was 3.17 billion USD in 2018 (Turkish exports/imports: 2.03/1.14 billion USD).; 213,333 Algerian tourists visited Turkey in 2017.; Yunus Emre Institute has a local headquarters in Algiers. | X |
| Egypt | 8 May 1925 | See Egypt–Turkey relations: Egypt has an embassy in Ankara and a consulate general in Istanbul.; Turkey has an embassy in Cairo and a consulate general in Alexandria.; Trade volume between the two countries was 5.25 billion USD in 2018 (Turkish exports/imports: 3.06/2.19 billion USD).; 100,971 Egyptian tourists visited Turkey in 2017.; Yunus Emre Institute has a local headquarters in Cairo since 2010. | ✓ |
| Libya | 30 December 1952 | See Libya–Turkey relations: Libya has an embassy in Ankara and a consulate general in Istanbul.; Turkey has an embassy in Tripoli. and a consulate general in Misurata.; Trade volume between the two countries was 1.87 billion USD in 2018 (Turkish exports/imports: 1.50/0.37 billion USD).; 188,312 Libyan tourists visited Turkey in 2018. | X |
| Mauritania | 14 April 1970 | See Mauritania–Turkey relations: Mauritania has an embassy in Ankara.; Turkey has an embassy in Nouakchott.; Trade volume between the two countries was 245 million USD in 2019.; There are direct flights from Istanbul to Nouakchott. | X |
| Morocco | 17 April 1956 | See Morocco–Turkey relations: Morocco has an embassy in Ankara and a consulate general in Istanbul.; Turkey has an embassy in Rabat.; Trade volume between the two countries was 2.71 billion USD in 2018 (Turkish exports/imports: 1.99/0.72 billion USD).; 114,155 Moroccan tourists visited Turkey in 2017.; Yunus Emre Institute has a local headquarters in Rabat. | ✓ |
| Sudan | 20 July 1957 | See Sudan–Turkey relations: Sudan has an embassy in Ankara.; Turkey has an embassy in Khartoum.; Trade volume between the two countries was 434 million USD in 2019 (Turkish exports/imports: 361/73 million USD).; Yunus Emre Institute has a local headquarters in Khartoum. | X |
| Tunisia | 1956 | See Tunisia–Turkey relations: Tunisia has an embassy in Ankara and a consulate general in Istanbul.; Turkey has an embassy in Tunis.; Trade volume between the two countries was 1.09 billion USD in 2018 (Turkish exports/imports: 904/182 million USD).; Yunus Emre Institute has a local headquarters in Tunis. | ✓ |

==== Sub–Saharan Africa ====
Since 2008, economic and diplomatic relations with Africa have flourished due to a strong sentiment of fellowship among Turkish people towards Africans. Foreign trade between sub-Saharan Africa and Turkey increased from US$581 million in 1998 to US$5.08 billion in 2015.

Dating back to 1800, Turkey's relations with sub-Saharan Africa flourished from the 1860s—when the Ottoman Empire started sending trained imams to the region—until 1885, when other European colonial powers blocked Ottoman influence. Relations were restored in the 1950s, and gained momentum when Emperor Haile Selassie visited Turkey in March 1967 and December 1969.

Since 2008, Turkey has contributed to the region through participation in peacekeeping missions, including the UN Mission in Ivory Coast (UNOC), the Democratic Republic of the Congo, Liberia, Central African Republic, Chad.

Turkey has also dramatically increased financial aid to the region, providing a total of US$6.38 billion to the region just between 2006 and 2011 including the 2011 donation of US$200 million to fight the famine in East Africa.

| Country/Region | Relations began | Notes | Free trade agreement |
|---|---|---|---|
| Angola | 9 July 1980 | See Angola–Turkey relations: Angola has an embassy in Ankara.; Turkey has an embassy in Luanda.; Trade volume between the two countries was 212 million USD in 2019.; There are direct flights from Istanbul to Luanda since 27 October 2021. | X |
| Benin | 29 March 1974 | See Benin–Turkey relations: Benin closed its embassy in Ankara in 2021.; Turkey has an embassy in Cotonou.; Trade volume between the two countries was 142 million USD in 2019.; There are direct flights from Istanbul to Cotonou since 2014. | X |
| Botswana | 20 January 1981 | Permanent Representation of Botswana in the UN Geneva Office is also accredited to Turkey.; Turkey has an embassy in Gaborone.; Trade volume between the two countries was 2.9 million USD in 2019. | X |
| Burkina Faso | 6 April 1970 | See Burkina Faso–Turkey relations: Burkina Faso has an embassy in Ankara.; Turkey has an embassy in Ouagadougou.; Trade volume between the two countries was 52.2 million USD in 2019 (Turkish exports/imports: 31.4/20.8 million USD). | X |
| Burundi | 30 April 1980 | See Burundi–Turkey relations: Burundi has an embassy in Ankara.; Turkey has an embassy in Bujumbura.; Trade volume between the two countries was 3.1 million USD in 2019 (Turkish exports/imports: 2.6/0.5 million USD). | X |
| Cameroon | 9 August 1963 | See Cameroon–Turkey relations: Cameroon has an embassy in Ankara.; Turkey has an embassy in Yaoundé.; Trade volume between the two countries was 205 million USD in 2019 (Turkish exports/imports: 151/54 million USD).; There are direct flights from Istanbul to Yaoundé. | X |
| Cape Verde | 24 June 1979 | See Cape Verde–Turkey relations: The Turkish ambassador in Dakar to Senegal is also accredited to Cabo Verde.; Trade volume between the two countries was 9.5 million USD in 2019. | X |
| Central African Republic | 18 February 1980 | See Central African Republic–Turkey relations: Central African Republic has an honorary consulate in Istanbul.; The Turkish ambassador in Yaoundé to Cameroon is also accredited to the Central African Republic.; Trade volume between the two countries was 5.81 million USD in 2019 (Turkish exports/imports: 3.84/1.97 million USD). | X |
| Chad | 27 January 1970 | See Chad–Turkey relations: Chad has an embassy in Ankara.; Turkey has an embassy in N'Djamena.; Trade volume between the two countries was 72.4 million USD in 2019 (Turkish exports/imports: 39.9/32.5 million USD).; There are direct flights from Istanbul to N'Djamena since 12 December 2013. | X |
| Comoros | 22 August 1979 | See Comoros–Turkey relations: The ambassador of the Comoros in Cairo to Egypt is also accredited to Turkey.; The Turkish ambassador in Antananarivo to Madagascar is also accredited to the Union of the Comoros.; Trade volume between the two countries was 21.1 million USD in 2019. | X |
| Congo | 9 November 1981 | See Republic of the Congo–Turkey relations: Congo has an embassy in Ankara.; Turkey has an embassy in Brazzaville.; Trade volume between the two countries was 57.25 million USD in 2019 (Turkish exports/imports: 55.8/1.47 million USD). | X |
| Ivory Coast | 14 July 1964 | See Ivory Coast–Turkey relations: Ivory Coast has an embassy in Ankara.; Turkey has an embassy in Abidjan.; Trade volume between the two countries was 409.7 million USD in 2019 (Turkish exports/imports: 220.9/188.8 million USD).; There are direct flights from Istanbul to Abidjan since July 2012. | X |
| Democratic Republic of Congo | 22 October 1975 | See Democratic Republic of the Congo–Turkey relations: Democratic Republic of the Congo has an embassy in Ankara.; Turkey has an embassy in Kinshasa.; Trade volume between the two countries was 54.7 million USD in 2019. | X |
| Djibouti | 25 June 1979 | See Djibouti–Turkey relations: Djibouti has an embassy in Ankara.; Turkey has an embassy in Djibouti.; Trade volume between the two countries was 252 million USD in 2019. | X |
| Eritrea | 19 July 1993 | See Eritrea–Turkey relations: The ambassador of Eritrea in Doha to Qatar is also accredited to Turkey.; Turkey has an embassy in Asmara.; Trade volume between the two countries was 13.9 million USD in 2019. | X |
| Equatorial Guinea | 16 September 1980 | See Equatorial Guinea–Turkey relations: Equatorial Guinea has an embassy in Ankara.; Turkey has an embassy in Malabo.; Trade volume between the two countries was 23.8 million USD in 2019 (Turkish exports/imports: 20.2/3.6 million USD).; There are direct flights from Istanbul to Malabo since 7 February 2020. | X |
| Eswatini | 20 January 1981 | The Embassy of the Eswatini in Brussels to Belgium is also accredited to Turkey.; The Turkish ambassador in Pretoria to South Africa is also accredited to Eswatini.; Trade volume between the two countries was 309 thousand USD in 2019. | X |
| Ethiopia | 30 January 1926, severed in 1936, re-established 23 December 1957 | See Ethiopia–Turkey relations: Ethiopia has an embassy in Ankara.; Turkey has an embassy in Addis Ababa.; Trade volume between the two countries was 398.8 million USD in 2019 (Turkish exports/imports: 378.3/27.5 million USD). | X |
| Gabon | 1 February 1963 | See Gabon–Turkey relations: Gabon has an embassy in Ankara.; Turkey has an embassy in Libreville.; Trade volume between the two countries was 38.9 million USD in 2018. | X |
| Gambia | 1965 | See Gambia–Turkey relations: Gambia has an embassy in Ankara.; Turkey has an embassy in Banjul.; There are direct flights from Istanbul to Banjul since August 2018. | X |
| Ghana | | See Ghana–Turkey relations: Ghana has an embassy in Ankara.; Turkey has an embassy in Accra.; Trade volume between the two countries was 353.3 million USD in 2018. | Pending Ratification |
| Guinea | | See Guinea–Turkey relations: Guinea has an embassy in Ankara.; Turkey has an embassy in Conakry.; Trade volume between the two countries was 136.7 million USD in 2019.; There are direct flights from Istanbul to Conakry since 30 January 2017. | X |
| Guinea-Bissau | | See Guinea-Bissau–Turkey relations: Guinea-Bissau has an embassy in Ankara.; Turkey has an embassy in Bissau.; Trade volume between the two countries was 4.95 million USD in 2019. | X |
| Kenya | 30 March 1968 | See Kenya–Turkey relations: Kenya has an embassy in Ankara.; Turkey has an embassy in Nairobi.; Trade volume between the two countries was 234 million USD in 2019.; There are direct flights from Istanbul to Nairobi since 20 February 2009. | X |
| Lesotho | 1980 | The Embassy of Lesotho in Rome is also accredited to Turkey.; The Turkish ambassador in Pretoria to South Africa is also accredited to Lesotho.; Trade volume between the two countries was 1.65 million USD in 2019 (Turkish exports/imports: 1.62/0.03 million USD). | X |
| Liberia | 1 August 1958 | See Liberia–Turkey relations: The Embassy of Liberia in Brussels is also accredited to Turkey.; The Turkish ambassador in Accra to Ghana is also accredited to Liberia.; Trade volume between the two countries was 191.9 million USD in 2019. | X |
| Madagascar | | See Madagascar–Turkey relations: Embassy of Madagascar in Rome to Italy is also accredited to Turkey.; Turkey has an embassy in Antananarivo.; Trade volume between the two countries was 76.5 million USD in 2019 (Turkish exports/imports: 71.3/5.2 million USD). | X |
| Mali | 17 April 1963 | See Mali–Turkey relations: Mali has an embassy in Ankara.; Turkey has an embassy in Bamako.; Trade volume between the two countries was 57 million USD in 2019 (Turkish exports/imports: 48.4/8.6 million USD). | X |
| Malawi | 4 August 1969 | See Malawi–Turkey relations: The Embassy of Malawi in Berlin to Germany is also accredited to Turkey.; The Turkish ambassador in Lusaka to Zambia is also accredited to Malawi.; Trade volume between the two countries was 21 million USD in 2019 (Turkish exports/imports: 4.67/16.4 million USD). | X |
| Mauritius | 18 October 1976 | See Mauritius–Turkey relations: The Embassy of Mauritius in Berlin to Germany is also accredited to Turkey.; The Turkish ambassador in Antananarivo to Madagascar is also accredited to Mauritius.; Trade volume between the two countries was 76.5 million USD in 2019.; There are direct flights from Istanbul to Mauritius since 15 December 2015. | ✓ |
| Mozambique | 20 January 1981 | See Mozambique–Turkey relations: The Embassy of Mozambique in Rome to Italy is also accredited to Turkey.; Turkey has an embassy in Maputo.; Trade volume between the two countries was 153 million USD in 2019. | X |
| Namibia | 27 March 1990 | See Namibia–Turkey relations: Turkey has an embassy in Windhoek.; Trade volume between the two countries was 11.84 million USD in 2019 (Turkish exports/imports: 9.40/2.44 million USD). | X |
| Niger | 30 March 1967 | See Niger–Turkey relations: Niger has an embassy in Ankara.; Turkey has an embassy in Niamey.; Trade volume between the two countries was 72 million USD in 2019. | X |
| Nigeria | 16 February 1961 | See Nigeria–Turkey relations: Nigeria has an embassy in Ankara.; Turkey has an embassy in Abuja.; Trade volume between the two countries was 726 million USD in 2019.; There are direct flights from Istanbul to Abuja, Lagos and Port-Harcourt. | X |
| Rwanda | 18 February 1980 | See Rwanda–Turkey relations: Rwanda has an embassy in Ankara.; Turkey has an embassy in Kigali.; Trade volume between the two countries was 32.4 million USD in 2019 (Turkish exports/imports: 32.2/0.2 million USD). | X |
| São Tomé and Príncipe | | The Embassy of São Tomé and Príncipe in Lisbon is also accredited to Turkey.; The Turkish ambassador in Libreville to Gabon is also accredited to São Tomé and Príncipe.; Trade volume between the two countries was 2.3 million USD in 2019. | X |
| Senegal | 17 October 1963 | See Senegal–Turkey relations: Senegal has an embassy in Ankara.; Turkey has an embassy in Dakar.; Trade volume between the two countries was 292 million USD in 2019.; There are direct flights from Istanbul to Dakar.; Yunus Emre Institute has a local headquarters in Dakar. | X |
| Seychelles | 22 June 1995 | See Seychelles–Turkey relations: The Embassy of Seychelles in Paris is also accredited to Turkey.; The Turkish ambassador in Nairobi to Kenya is also accredited to the Seychelles.; Trade volume between the two countries was 25.4 million USD in 2019 (Turkish exports/imports: 17.7/7.7 million USD). | X |
| Sierra Leone | 15 February 1971 | See Sierra Leone–Turkey relations: Sierra Leone has an embassy in Ankara.; Turkey has an embassy in Freetown.; Trade volume between the two countries was 53.4 million USD in 2019.; There are direct flights from Istanbul to Freetown. | X |
| Somalia | 13 December 1965 | See Somalia–Turkey relations: Somalia has an embassy in Ankara.; Turkey has an embassy in Mogadishu and a consulate general in Hargeisa.; Trade volume between the two countries was 250.8 million USD in 2019.; Yunus Emre Institute has a local headquarters in Mogadishu. | X |
| South Africa | 12 October 1992 | See South Africa–Turkey relations: South Africa has an embassy in Ankara.; Turkey has an embassy in Pretoria.; Trade volume between the two countries was 1.3 billion USD in 2019 (Turkish exports/imports: 552.5/757.5 million USD).; There are direct flights from Istanbul to Cape Town and Durban since 2015.; 3,600 Turkish citizens reside in South Africa.; Yunus Emre Institute has a local headquarters in Johannesburg. | X |
| South Sudan | 9 July 2011 | See South Sudan–Turkey relations: South Sudan has an embassy in Ankara.; Turkey has an embassy in Juba.; Trade volume between the two countries was 3.2 million USD in 2019. | X |
| Tanzania | 5 July 1963 | See Tanzania–Turkey relations: Tanzania has an embassy in Ankara.; Turkey has an embassy in Dar es Salaam.; Trade volume between the two countries was 151 million USD in 2015.; There are direct flights from Istanbul to Dar es Salaam and Kilimanjaro since 2010. | X |
| Togo | 6 December 1962 | See Togo–Turkey relations: Turkey has an embassy in Lomé (planned).; Trade volume between the two countries was 106 million USD in 2019. | X |
| Uganda | 18 September 1969 | See Turkey–Uganda relations: Uganda has an embassy in Ankara.; Turkey has an embassy in Kampala.; Trade volume between the two countries was 40 million USD in 2018. | X |
| Zambia | 25 February 1971 | See Turkey–Zambia relations: Zambia has an embassy in Ankara.; Turkey has an embassy in Lusaka.; Trade volume between the two countries was 23.7 million USD in 2019 (Turkish exports/imports: 17.8/5.9 million USD).; There are direct flights from Istanbul to Lusaka since 14 December 2018. | X |
| Zimbabwe | 2 July 1982 | See Turkey–Zimbabwe relations: Zimbabwe has an embassy in Ankara.; Turkey has an embassy in Harare.; Trade volume between the two countries was 17.7 million USD in 2019 (Turkish exports/imports: 5.9/11.8 million USD). | X |

=== Americas ===
==== Southern Cone ====
| Country/Region | Relations began | Notes | Free trade agreement |
|---|---|---|---|
| Argentina | 29 June 1926 | See Argentina–Turkey relations President Erdoğan with then-president Mauricio Macri in Buenos Aires.: Argentina has an embassy in Ankara.; Turkey has an embassy in Buenos Aires.; Both countries are members of G20 and WTO.; Flights from Istanbul to Buenos Aires via São Paulo commenced in December 2013 and are taking place daily.; Trade volume between the two countries was 455 million USD in 2019 (Turkish exports/imports: 161/294 million USD.; 64,483 Argentine tourists visited Turkey in 2019. | X |
| Chile | 30 January 1926 | See Chile–Turkey relations President Erdoğan and Sebastián Piñera: Chile has an embassy in Ankara.; Turkey has an embassy in Santiago.; Both countries are members of OECD and WTO.; Chile–Turkey Free Trade Agreement was signed on 14 July 2009 and has been in effect since 1 March 2011.; Trade volume between the two countries was 579 million USD in 2019 (Turkish exports/imports: 344/236 million USD.; 18,509 Chilean tourists visited Turkey in 2019.; Chile was the first country in Latin America to recognize Turkey. | ✓ |
| Paraguay | 11 September 1953 | See Paraguay–Turkey relations: Paraguay has an embassy in Ankara.; Turkey has an embassy in Asunción.; Trade volume between the two countries was 82.1 million USD in 2019 (Turkish exports/imports: 47.1/35 million USD).; 1,328 Paraguayan tourists visited Turkey in 2019. | X |
| Uruguay | 8 December 1933 | See Turkey–Uruguay relations: Uruguay has an embassy in Ankara and a consulate-general in Istanbul.; Turkey has an embassy in Montevideo.; Trade volume between the two countries was 341.4 million USD in 2019 (Turkish exports/imports: 42.8/298.6 million USD).; 7,191 Uruguayan tourists visited Turkey in 2019. | X |

==== North America ====
| Country | Relations began | Notes | Free trade agreement |
|---|---|---|---|
| Canada | 25 November 1943 | See Canada–Turkey relations: Canada has an embassy in Ankara and a consulate general in Istanbul.; Turkey has an embassy in Ottawa and Consulates General in Montreal, Toronto and Vancouver.; Both countries are members of OECD, G20, NATO and WTO.; There are direct flights from Istanbul to Toronto, Montreal and Vancouver (starting in December 2020).; Trade volume between the two countries was 2.46 billion USD in 2019.; 139,164 Canadian tourists visited Turkey in 2019.; Around 65,000 people of Turkish origin live in Canada. | X |
| Mexico | 12 July 1928 | See Mexico–Turkey relations President Erdoğan visiting Mexico with former Mexican President Enrique Peña Nieto: Mexico has an embassy in Ankara and a consulate in Istanbul.; Turkey has an embassy in Mexico City.; Both countries are members of OECD, G20 and WTO.; Flights from Istanbul to Mexico City and Cancún were launched in August 2019.; Trade volume between the two countries was 1.3 billion USD in 2019 (Turkish exports/imports: 602/678 million USD).; 66,557 Mexican tourists visited Turkey in 2019.; Yunus Emre Institute has a local headquarters in Mexico City. | X |
| United States | 13 September 1831, relations broke off 20 April 1917, re-established 17 February 1927 | See Turkey–United States relations Presidents Erdoğan and Trump with the First Ladies.: United States has an embassy in Ankara, a consulate general in Istanbul and a Consulate in Adana.; Turkey has an embassy in Washington, D.C. and Consulates General in Boston, Chicago, Houston, Los Angeles, Miami and New York City.; Both countries are members of OECD, G20, NATO and WTO.; There are direct flights from Istanbul to Atlanta, Boston, Chicago, Dallas, Houston, Los Angeles, Miami, Newark, San Francisco, Seattle (starts 9 March 2022) and Washington, D.C.; 578,074 American tourists visited Turkey in 2019.; Yunus Emre Institute has a local headquarters in Washington, D.C.; Following its NATO membership in 1952 and subsequent hosting of the United States Air Force in Incirlik Air Base, Turkey became the bulwark of NATO's southeastern flank, the directly bordering Warsaw Pact countries. Turkey participated with the United States during the Korean War of the early 1950s and the Gulf War of 1990. | X |

==== Caribbean ====
| Country/Region | Relations began | Notes | Free trade agreement |
|---|---|---|---|
| Antigua and Barbuda | June 1999 | The Turkish ambassador in Santo Domingo to the Dominican Republic is also accredited to Antigua and Barbuda.; Trade volume between the two countries was 12.5 million USD in 2019. | X |
| Bahamas | 5 November 1974 | See Bahamas–Turkey relations: The Turkish ambassador in Havana to Cuba is also accredited to the Commonwealth of the Bahamas.; Trade volume between the two countries was 86.1 million USD in 2019. | X |
| Barbados | 20 September 1972 | The Turkish ambassador in Port of Spain to Trinidad and Tobago is also accredited to Barbados.; Trade volume between the two countries was 8.5 million USD in 2019 (Turkish exports/imports: 8.45/0.05 million USD). | X |
| Cuba | 25 November 1952 | See Cuba–Turkey relations: Turkey has an embassy in Havana.; Trade volume between the two countries was 54.7 million USD in 2019 (Turkish exports/imports: 42.9/11.8 million USD).; The Ottoman Empire Embassy to Cuba opened in 1873. | X |
| Dominica | 13 April 2006 | The Turkish ambassador in Santo Domingo to the Dominican Republic is also accredited to Dominica.; Trade volume between the two countries was 1.6 million USD in 2019. | X |
| Dominican Republic | 28 November 1951 | See Dominican Republic–Turkey relations: Turkey has an embassy in Santo Domingo.; Trade volume between the two countries was 132.7 million USD in 2019 (Turkish exports/imports: 118.6/14.1 million USD). | X |
| Grenada | 8 May 1975 | The Turkish ambassador in Port of Spain to Trinidad and Tobago is also accredited to Grenada.; Trade volume between the two countries was 910 thousand USD in 2019. | X |
| Haiti | 1950 | See Haiti–Turkey relations: The Turkish ambassador in Santo Domingo to the Dominican Republic is also accredited to Haiti.; Trade volume between the two countries was 129.7 million USD in 2019 (Turkish exports/imports: 128.9/0.8 million USD). | X |
| Jamaica | 30 March 1971 | See Jamaica–Turkey relations: The Turkish ambassador in Havana to Cuba is also accredited to Jamaica.; Trade volume between the two countries was 90.5 million USD in 2019 (Turkish exports/imports: 90/0.5 million USD). | X |
| St. Kitts and Nevis | | The Turkish ambassador in Santo Domingo to the Dominican Republic is also accredited to St. Kitts and Nevis.; Trade volume between the two countries was 5.9 million USD in 2019. | X |
| St. Lucia | 25 May 2005 | The Turkish ambassador in Port of Spain to Trinidad and Tobago is also accredited to St. Lucia.; Trade volume between the two countries was 3 million USD in 2019. | X |
| St. Vincent and Grenadines | 4 April 2002 | See Saint Vincent and the Grenadines–Turkey relations: The Turkish ambassador in Port of Spain to Trinidad and Tobago is also accredited to St. Vincent and Grenadines.; Trade volume between the two countries was 11.3 million USD in 2019 (Turkish exports/imports: 4.8/6.5 million USD). | X |
| Trinidad and Tobago | 22 May 1972 | See Trinidad and Tobago–Turkey relations: Turkey has an embassy in Port of Spain.; Trade volume between the two countries was 120.8 million USD in 2019 (Turkish exports/imports: 68.4/52.4 million USD). | X |

==== Central America ====
| Country/Region | Relations began | Notes | Free trade agreement |
|---|---|---|---|
| Belize | November 1987 | See Belize–Turkey relations: The Turkish ambassador in Port of Spain to Trinidad and Tobago is also accredited to Belize.; Trade volume between the two countries was 13.7 million USD in 2019 (Turkish exports/imports: 10.1/3.6 million USD). | X |
| Costa Rica | 21 September 1950 | See Costa Rica–Turkey relations: Costa Rica has an embassy in Ankara.; Turkey has an embassy in San Jose.; Trade volume between the two countries was 100 million USD in 2019 (Turkish exports/imports: 58.9/41.8 million USD). | X |
| El Salvador | 21 September 1950 | El Salvador has an embassy in Ankara.; Turkey has an embassy in San Salvador.; Trade volume between the two countries was 17.1 million USD in 2019 (Turkish exports/imports: 14.8/2.3 million USD). | X |
| Guatemala | 1952 | See Guatemala–Turkey relations: Guatemala has an embassy in Ankara and an honorary consulate in Istanbul.; Turkey has an embassy in Guatemala City.; Trade volume between the two countries was 63.5 million USD in 2019 (Turkish exports/imports: 53.5/10 million USD). | X |
| Honduras | 4 April 1950 | The Turkish ambassador in Guatemala City to Guatemala is also accredited to Honduras.; Trade volume between the two countries was 19.8 million USD in 2019 (Turkish exports/imports: 15/4.8 million USD). | X |
| Nicaragua | 21 September 1950 | See Nicaragua–Turkey relations: Turkey has an embassy in Managua.; Nicaraguan Embassy in Berlin to Germany is also accredited to Turkey.; Trade volume between the two countries was 11.6 million USD in 2019 (Turkish exports/imports: 11.1/0.5 million USD). | X |
| Panama | 14 April 1950 | See Panama–Turkey relations: Panama has an embassy in Ankara.; Turkey has an embassy in Panama.; Trade volume between the two countries was 260.9 million USD in 2019 (Turkish exports/imports: 248.8/12.1 million USD). | X |

==== Latin America, rest of ====
| Country/Region | Relations began | Notes | Free trade agreement |
|---|---|---|---|
| Bolivia | 26 July 1950 | See Bolivia–Turkey relations: Turkey has an embassy in La Paz.; Trade volume between the two countries was 130 million USD in 2019 (Turkish exports/imports: 22/108 million USD).; 2,491 Bolivian tourists visited Turkey in 2019. | X |
| Brazil | 8 September 1927 | See Brazil–Turkey relations Prime Minister Erdoğan meets with President Luiz Inácio Lula da Silva.: Brazil has an embassy in Ankara and a consulate general in Istanbul.; Turkey has an embassy in Brasília and a consulate general in São Paulo.; Both countries are members of G20 and WTO.; There are daily direct flights from Istanbul to São Paulo.; Trade volume between the two countries was 3.1 billion USD in 2019 (Turkish exports/imports: 0.48/2.6 billion USD).; 101,164 Brazilian tourists visited Turkey in 2019. | X |
| Colombia | 10 April 1959 | See Colombia–Turkey relations: Colombia has an embassy in Ankara.; Turkey has an embassy in Bogotá.; Both countries are members of OECD and WTO.; Flights from Istanbul to Bogotá commenced in May 2016.; Trade volume between the two countries was 1.7 billion USD in 2019 (Turkish exports/imports: 0.25/1.46 billion USD).; 70,974 Colombian tourists visited Turkey in 2019. | X |
| Ecuador | 11 December 1959 | See Ecuador–Turkey relations: Ecuador has an embassy in Ankara and a consulate general in Istanbul.; Turkey has an embassy in Quito and a consulate general in Guayaquil.; Trade volume between the two countries was 117 million USD in 2019 (Turkish exports/imports: 59/58 million USD).; 8,416 Ecuadorian tourists visited Turkey in 2019. | X |
| Guyana | 2 May 1973 | The Turkish ambassador in Port of Spain to Trinidad and Tobago is also accredited to Guyana.; Trade volume between the two countries was 29.6 million USD in 2019 (Turkish exports/imports: 28.6/1 million USD). | X |
| Peru | 1952 | See Peru–Turkey relations: Peru has an embassy in Ankara and a consulate general in Istanbul.; Turkey has an embassy in Lima.; Trade volume between the two countries was 250 million USD in 2019 (Turkish exports/imports: 177.4/72.6 million USD).; 11,430 Peruvian tourists visited Turkey in 2019. | X |
| Suriname | 29 June 1976 | See Suriname–Turkey relations: The Turkish ambassador in Port of Spain to Trinidad and Tobago is also accredited to Suriname.; Trade volume between the two countries was 18.2 million USD in 2019 (Turkish exports/imports: 18.1/0.1 million USD). | X |
| Venezuela | 29 December 1950 | See Turkey–Venezuela relations: Turkey has an embassy in Caracas and an honorary consulate in Maracaibo.; Venezuela has an embassy in Ankara and a consulate general in Istanbul.; Trade volume between the two countries was 150 million USD in 2019 (Turkish exports/imports: 130/20 million USD). | X |

=== Asia and Oceania ===
==== Turkic states ====
| Country/Region | Relations began | Notes | Free trade agreement |
|---|---|---|---|
| Azerbaijan | 14 January 1992 | See Azerbaijan–Turkey relations: Azerbaijan has an embassy in Ankara and Consulates General in Istanbul and Kars and Consular Mission in Iğdır.; Turkey has an embassy in Baku and Consulates General in Nakhchivan and Ganja.; Both countries are members of Asia Cooperation Dialogue, Council of Europe, Economic Cooperation Organization, International Organization of Turkic Culture, OIC, TAKM, Turkic Council, TURKPA, Organization of the Black Sea Economic Cooperation and OSCE.; Trade volume between the two countries was 4.18 billion USD in 2019 (Turkish exports/imports: 1.63/2.55 billion USD).; 901,723 Azeri tourists visited Turkey in 2019.; Azerbaijan-Turkey relations have been described as "one nation with two states" due to a common culture and the mutual intelligibility of Turkish and Azerbaijani.; Turkey became the first state to recognize the Republic of Azerbaijan in November 1991.; Yunus Emre Institute has a local branch in Baku. | X |
| Kazakhstan | 2 March 1992 | See Kazakhstan–Turkey relations: Kazakhstan has an embassy in Ankara and consulates general in Antalya and Istanbul.; Turkey has an embassy in Astana and a consulate general in Almaty.; Both countries are members of Asia Cooperation Dialogue, Economic Cooperation Organization, International Organization of Turkic Culture, OIC, TAKM, Turkic Council, TURKPA, OSCE and WTO.; Trade volume between the two countries was 3.9 billion USD in 2019 (Turkish exports/imports: 0.9/3 billion USD).; 455,724 Kazakh tourists visited Turkey in 2019.; Turkey became the first state to recognize the Republic of Kazakhstan.; Yunus Emre Institute has a local branch in Astana. | X |
| Kyrgyzstan | 29 January 1992 | See Kyrgyzstan–Turkey relations: Kyrgyzstan has an embassy in Ankara.; Turkey has an embassy in Bishkek.; Both countries are members of Asia Cooperation Dialogue, Economic Cooperation Organization, International Organization of Turkic Culture, OIC, TAKM, Turkic Council, TURKPA, OSCE and WTO.; Trade volume between the two countries was 519 million USD in 2019 (Turkish exports/imports: 442/77 million USD).; 121,364 Kyrgyz tourists visited Turkey in 2019.; Turkey became the first state to recognize the Republic of Kyrgyzstan. | X |
| Turkmenistan | 29 February 1992 | See Turkey–Turkmenistan relations: Turkmenistan has an embassy in Ankara.; Turkey has an embassy in Ashgabat.; Both countries are members of Economic Cooperation Organization, International Organization of Turkic Culture and OIC.; Trade volume between the two countries was 1.35 billion USD in 2019 (Turkish exports/imports: 745/601 million USD).; 297,706 Turkmen tourists visited Turkey in 2019.; Turkey became the first state to recognize Turkmenistan on 27 October 1991. | X |
| Uzbekistan | 4 March 1992 | See Turkey–Uzbekistan relations: Uzbekistan has an embassy in Ankara and a Consulate General in Istanbul; Turkey has an embassy in Tashkent.; Both countries are members of Asia Cooperation Dialogue, Economic Cooperation Organization, International Organization of Turkic Culture, OIC, TAKM, Turkic Council, TURKPA, OSCE and WTO.; Trade volume between the two countries was 2.3 billion USD in 2019 (Turkish exports/imports: 1.23/1.14 billion USD).; 252,138 Uzbek tourists visited Turkey in 2019. | X |

==== Asia-Pacific ====
| Country/Region | Relations began | Notes | Free trade agreement |
|---|---|---|---|
| Afghanistan | 1 March 1921 | See Afghanistan–Turkey relations: Afghanistan has an embassy in Ankara and a Consulate General in Istanbul.; Turkey has an embassy in Kabul and Consulate General in Kandahar and Mazar-e Sharif.; Both countries are members of Asia Cooperation Dialogue, Economic Cooperation Organization, OIC and WTO.; Trade volume between the two countries was 180 million USD in 2019 (Turkish exports/imports: 24/156 million USD).; Yunus Emre Institute has a local branch in Kabul. | X |
| Australia | 1967 | See Australia–Turkey relations: Australia has an embassy in Ankara and a Consulate General in Istanbul and Çanakkale.; Turkey has an embassy in Canberra and Consulate General in Melbourne and Sydney.; Both countries are members of G20, MIKTA, OECD and WTO.; Trade volume between the two countries was 1.66 billion USD in 2015 (Turkish exports/imports: 521.6/544.8 million USD).; 120,837 Australian tourists visited Turkey in 2019.; 150 thousand Turkish citizens reside in Australia.; Yunus Emre Institute has a local branch in Melbourne. | X |
| Bangladesh | | See Bangladesh–Turkey relations: Bangladesh has an embassy in Ankara.; Turkey has an embassy in Dhaka.; Both countries are members of OIC.; Trade volume between the two countries was 934 million USD in 2019 (Turkish exports/imports: 427/509 million USD). | X |
| Bhutan | 26 September 2012 | Bhutan and Turkey cooperate through their respective embassies in New Delhi.; Trade volume between the two countries was 1.58 million USD in 2018 (Turkish exports/imports: 0.1/1.48 million USD). | X |
| Brunei Darussalam | 27 June 1984 | See Brunei–Turkey relations: Brunei Darussalam has an embassy in Ankara.; Turkey has an embassy in Bandar Seri Begawan.; Both countries are members of OIC.; Trade volume between the two countries was 4.88 billion USD in 2015 (Turkish exports/imports: 4882/16 million USD). | X |
| Cambodia | 1959 | See Cambodia–Turkey relations: Cambodia has an embassy in Ankara.; Turkey has an embassy in Phnom Penh.; Trade volume between the two countries was 108.4 million USD in 2015 (Turkish exports/imports: 13.7/94.7 million USD). | X |
| China | 1971 | See China–Turkey relations: China has an embassy in Ankara and Consulate General in Istanbul and İzmir.; Turkey has an embassy in Beijing and Consulate General in Guangzhou, Hong Kong and Shanghai; Both countries are members of G20 and WTO.; Trade volume between the two countries was 21.08 billion USD in 2019 (Turkish exports/imports: 2.58/18.49 billion USD).; 426,344 Chinese tourists visited Turkey in 2019.; There are direct flights from Istanbul to Beijing, Chengdu, Guangzhou, Hong Kong and Shanghai. | X |
| Cook Islands | 28 October 2008 | The Turkish ambassador in Wellington to New Zealand is also accredited to the Cook Islands.; Trade volume between the two countries was negligible in 2019. | X |
| Fiji | 17 December 1975 | The Turkish ambassador in Wellington to New Zealand is also accredited to Fiji.; Trade volume between the two countries was negligible in 2018. | X |
| India | 15 August 1947 | See India–Turkey relations Prime Minister Erdoğan meets with Narendra Modi in India.: India has an embassy in Ankara and a Consulate General in Istanbul.; Turkey has an embassy in New Delhi and Consulate General in Hyderabad and Mumbai.; Both countries are members of G20 and WTO.; Trade volume between the two countries was 7.80 billion USD in 2019 (Turkish exports/imports: 1.17/6.64 billion USD).; 230,131 Indian tourists visited Turkey in 2019. | X |
| Indonesia | 1950 | See Indonesia–Turkey relations: Indonesia has an embassy in Ankara.; Turkey has an embassy in Jakarta.; Both countries are members of D-8, G20, MIKTA, OIC and WTO.; Trade volume between the two countries was 1.85 billion USD in 2019 (Turkish exports/imports: 0.21/1.64 billion USD).; 127,149 Indonesian tourists visited Turkey in 2019.; 2,400 Indonesian citizens reside in Turkey. | X |
| Japan | 1890 | See Japan–Turkey relations: Japan has an embassy in Ankara and a Consulate General in Istanbul.; Turkey has an embassy in Tokyo and a Consulate General in Nagoya.; Both countries are members of G20, OECD and WTO.; Trade volume between the two countries was 4.02 billion USD in 2019 (Turkish exports/imports: 0.5/3.52 billion USD).; 103,320 Japanese tourists visited Turkey in 2019.; Yunus Emre Institute has a local branch in Tokyo. | X |
| Kiribati | 2008 | The Turkish ambassador in Canberra to Australia is also accredited to Kiribati.; Trade volume between the two countries was negligible in 2018. | X |
| Laos | 1958 | See Laos–Turkey relations: The Embassy of Laos in Vienna is also accredited to Turkey.; Turkey has an embassy in Vientiane.; Trade volume between the two countries was 2.92 billion USD in 2018 (Turkish exports/imports: 1.44/1.48 billion USD). | X |
| Maldives | 1979 | See Maldives–Turkey relations: The Permanent Mission of the Republic of Maldives to the United Nations Office in Geneva is also accredited to Turkey.; The Turkish ambassador in New Delhi to India is also accredited to the Maldives.; Both countries are members of OIC.; Trade volume between the two countries was 46.5 million USD in 2019 (Turkish exports/imports: 28.2/18.3 million USD).; There are direct flights from Istanbul to Malé since 24 November 2012. | X |
| Malaysia | 1964 | See Malaysia–Turkey relations: Malaysia has an embassy in Ankara.; Turkey has an embassy in Kuala Lumpur.; Both countries are members of D-8, OIC and WTO.; Trade volume between the two countries was 1.70 billion USD in 2015 (Turkish exports/imports: 0.36/1.34 billion USD).; 114,214 Malaysian tourists visited Turkey in 2019.; Yunus Emre Institute has a local branch in Kuala Lumpur. | ✓ |
| Marshall Islands | 9 April 2008 | See Marshall Islands–Turkey relations: Turkish ambassador in Canberra to Australia is also accredited to the Marshall Islands.; Marshall Islands has an honorary consulate in Istanbul.; Trade volume between the two countries was negligible in 2018. | X |
| Micronesia | 6 August 2007 | The Turkish ambassador in Canberra to Australia is also accredited to Micronesia.; Trade volume between the two countries was negligible in 2018. | X |
| Mongolia | 24 June 1969 | See Mongolia–Turkey relations: Mongolia has an embassy in Ankara.; Turkey has an embassy in Ulaanbaatar.; Both countries are members of Asia Cooperation Dialogue and WTO.; Trade volume between the two countries was 39.7 million USD in 2019 (Turkish exports/imports: 39.2/0.5 million USD). | X |
| Myanmar | 1958 | See Myanmar–Turkey relations: The Burmese Embassy in Cairo, Egypt is also accredited to Turkey.; Turkey has an embassy in Yangon.; Trade volume between the two countries was 38.7 million USD in 2015 (Turkish exports/imports: 30.7/8 million USD). | X |
| Nauru | | The Turkish ambassador in Canberra to Australia is also accredited to Nauru.; Trade volume between the two countries was negligible in 2018. | X |
| New Zealand | 12 December 1978 | See New Zealand–Turkey relations: New Zealand has an embassy in Ankara.; Turkey has an embassy in Wellington.; Both countries are members of OECD and WTO.; Trade volume between the two countries was 152.8 million USD in 2015 (Turkish exports/imports: 90.1/62.7 million USD).; 20,912 New Zealanders visited Turkey in 2019.; 1,700 Turkish citizens reside in New Zealand. | X |
| Niue | 7 June 2014 | Trade volume between the two countries was negligible in 2018. | X |
| North Korea | 15 January 2001 | See North Korea–Turkey relations: The Embassy of North Korea in Sofia is also accredited to Turkey.; The ambassador in Seoul to South Korea is also accredited to North Korea.; Trade volume between the two countries was negligible in 2018. | X |
| Pakistan | 1947 | See Pakistan–Turkey relations: Pakistan has an embassy in Ankara and a Consulate General in Istanbul.; Turkey has an embassy in Islamabad and Consulate General in Karachi and Lahore.; Both countries are members of Asia Cooperation Dialogue, Economic Cooperation Organization, OIC and WTO.; Trade volume between the two countries was 856 million USD in 2019 (Turkish exports/imports: 550/306 million USD).; 130,736 Pakistani tourists visited Turkey in 2019.; Yunus Emre Institute has local branches in Karachi and Lahore. | X |
| Palau | 10 May 2007 | Turkish ambassador in Tokyo to Japan is also accredited to Palau.; Trade volume between the two countries was 3.7 million USD in 2014. | X |
| Papua New Guinea | 30 May 1979 | Papua New Guinea has an honorary consulate in Istanbul.; Turkey has an embassy in Port Moresby.; Trade volume between the two countries was negligible in 2018. | X |
| Philippines | 13 June 1949 | See Philippines–Turkey relations: Philippines has an embassy in Ankara.; Turkey has an embassy in Manila.; Trade volume between the two countries was 219.7 million USD in 2015 (Turkish exports/imports: 104/115.7 million USD).; 139,126 Filipino tourists visited Turkey in 2019.; 2,200 Philippine nationals are residing in Turkey.; There are direct flights from Istanbul to Manila since March 2015. | X |
| Samoa | 12 April 1979 | See Samoa–Turkey relations: The Turkish ambassador in Wellington to New Zealand is also accredited to Samoa.; Trade volume between the two countries was negligible in 2018. | X |
| Singapore | 12 February 1969 | See Singapore–Turkey relations: Singapore has an embassy in Ankara.; Turkey has an embassy in Singapore.; Trade volume between the two countries was 808 million USD in 2015 (Turkish exports/imports: 443/365 million USD).; 34,930 Singaporean tourists visited Turkey in 2019.; There are direct flights from Istanbul to Singapore. | ✓ |
| Solomon Islands | 8 March 1979 | See Solomon Islands–Turkey relations: The Turkish ambassador in Canberra to Australia is also accredited to Solomon Islands since 8 March 1979.; Trade volume between the two countries was negligible in 2018. | X |
| South Korea | 11 August 1949 | See South Korea–Turkey relations: South Korea has an embassy in Ankara.; Turkey has an embassy in Seoul.; Both countries are members of G20, MIKTA, OECD and WTO.; Trade volume between the two countries was 6.53 billion USD in 2018 (Turkish exports/imports: 0.88/5.64 billion USD).; 212,970 South Korean tourists visited Turkey in 2019.; Free Trade Agreement between the two countries entered into force on 1 May 2013 and was updated on 1 August 2018 to include an Investment Agreement.; Turkey ranks third in number of martyrs among the 16 countries that participated in the Korean War. United Nations Memorial Cemetery in Busan honors 462 of the 966 Turkish soldiers who died during the war.; Yunus Emre Institute has a local branch in Seoul. | ✓ |
| Sri Lanka | 4 February 1948 | See Sri Lanka–Turkey relations: Sri Lanka has an embassy in Ankara.; Turkey has an embassy in Colombo.; Trade volume between the two countries was 185.7 million USD in 2018 (Turkish exports/imports: 84.3/101.4 million USD). | X |
| Taiwan | Started in 1934, Ended in 1971 | See Taiwan–Turkey relations: Diplomatic recognition was withdrawn in 1971 by the establishment of diplomatic relations between Turkey and China. | X |
| Tajikistan | 29 January 1992 | See Tajikistan–Turkey relations: Tajikistan has an embassy in Ankara.; Turkey has an embassy in Dushanbe.; Both countries are members of Asia Cooperation Dialogue, Economic Cooperation Organization, OIC and WTO.; Trade volume between the two countries was 274 million USD in 2019 (Turkish exports/imports: 143/131 million USD).; 44,155 Tajik tourists visited Turkey in 2019. | X |
| Thailand | 1958 | See Thailand–Turkey relations: Thailand has an embassy in Ankara.; Turkey has an embassy in Bangkok.; Trade volume between the two countries was 1.34 billion USD in 2018 (Turkish exports/imports: 0.26/1.09 billion USD).; 62,192 Thai tourists visited Turkey in 2019.; Negotiations on a bilateral Free Trade Agreement (FTA) began in 2017.; There are direct flights from Istanbul to Bangkok and Phuket. | X |
| Timor-Leste | 20 May 2002 | See East Timor–Turkey relations: The Turkish ambassador in Jakarta to Indonesia is also accredited to Timor-Leste.; Trade volume between the two countries was negligible in 2018. | X |
| Tonga | 26 January 1976 | See Tonga–Turkey relations: The Turkish ambassador in Wellington to New Zealand is also accredited to Tonga since 26 January 1976.; Trade volume between the two countries was negligible in 2018. | X |
| Tuvalu | 19 July 1979 | The Turkish ambassador in Wellington to New Zealand is also accredited to Tuvalu.; Trade volume between the two countries was negligible in 2018. | X |
| Vanuatu | 10 April 1987 | Turkish ambassador in Canberra to Australia is also accredited to Vanuatu.; Vanuatu has an honorary consulate in Istanbul.; Trade volume between the two countries was 17.4 million USD in 2018 (Turkish exports/imports: 10.3/7.1 million USD). | X |
| Vietnam | 1978 | See Turkey–Vietnam relations: Vietnam has an embassy in Ankara.; Turkey has an embassy in Hanoi.; Trade volume between the two countries was 1.91 billion USD in 2015 (Turkish exports/imports: 0.16/1.76 billion USD).; There are direct flights from Istanbul to Hanoi and Ho Chi Minh City since 27 June 2016. | X |

==== Western Asia ====
| Country/Region | Relations began | Notes | Free trade agreement |
|---|---|---|---|
| Armenia | | See Armenia–Turkey relations: Diplomatic relations suspended over the Nagorno-Karabakh War. | X |
| Bahrain | 12 April 1973 | See Bahrain–Turkey relations: Bahrain has an embassy in Ankara.; Turkey has an embassy in Manama.; Trade volume between the two countries was 486 million USD in 2018 (Turkish exports/imports: 299/187 million USD).; Yunus Emre Institute has a local branch in Manama. | X |
| Cyprus | | Diplomatic relations suspended over the Cyprus dispute. | ✓ |
| Northern Cyprus | 1983 | See Northern Cyprus–Turkey relations: Northern Cyprus has an embassy in Ankara and Consulates General in Antalya, Gaziantep, Istanbul, İzmir, Mersin and Trabzon.; Turkey has an embassy in North Nicosia; Yunus Emre Institute has a local branch in North Nicosia. | Free Trade |
| Georgia | 21 May 1992 | See Georgia–Turkey relations: Georgia has an embassy in Ankara and Consulates General in Istanbul and Trabzon.; Turkey has an embassy in Tbilisi and a consulate general in Batumi.; Both countries are members of Council of Europe, Economic Cooperation Organization, Organization of the Black Sea Economic Cooperation, Organization for Security and Co-operation in Europe and WTO.; Turkey supports Georgia's NATO membership.; Trade volume between the two countries was 1.85 billion USD in 2019 (Turkish exports/imports: 1.58/0.27 billion USD).; 1,995,254 Georgian tourists visited Turkey in 2019.; Yunus Emre Institute has a local branch in Tbilisi. | ✓ |
| Iran | 1835 | See Iran–Turkey relations: Iran has an embassy in Ankara and Consulates General in Istanbul, Trabzon and Erzurum.; Turkey has an embassy in Tehran and Consulates General in Tabriz, Orumiyeh and Mashhad.; Both countries are members of Economic Cooperation Organization and OIC.; Trade volume between the two countries was 5.60 billion USD in 2019 (Turkish exports/imports: 2.31/3.29 billion USD).; 2,102,890 Iranian tourists visited Turkey in 2019.; Yunus Emre Institute has a local branch in Tehran. | X |
| Iraq | 16 January 1928 | See Iraq–Turkey relations Both countries established diplomatic relations on 16 January 1928 when has been accredited the first Iraqi ambassador to Turkey Salih Nishat. The first Turkish ambassador, Lütfi Tokay, also presented his letters of credence in Baghdad on 21 December 1929.: Iraq has an embassy in Ankara and Consulates General in Gaziantep and Istanbul.; Turkey has an embassy in Baghdad and a consulate general in Erbil.; Trade volume between the two countries was 9.77 billion USD in 2018 (Turkish exports/imports: 8.35/1.42 billion USD).; 1,374,896 Iraqi tourists visited Turkey in 2019. | X |
| Kurdistan Region | 2001 | See Kurdistan Region–Turkey relations | |
| Israel | | See Israel–Turkey relations See also: History of the Jews in Turkey: Israel has an embassy in Ankara and a consulate general in Istanbul.; Turkey has an embassy in Tel Aviv.; Trade volume between the two countries was 4.37 billion USD in 2015 (Turkish exports/imports: 2.70/1.67 billion USD).; 569,368 Israeli tourists visited Turkey in 2019.; The history of the Jewish–Turkish relations dates back to 14th–16th centuries, when the Ottoman Sultan Beyazid II invited the Sephardic Jews fleeing the Spanish and Portuguese Inquisitions to settle in the Ottoman Empire.; During the 1930s and 1940s, the Republic of Turkey again served as a safe haven for the European Jewish refugees fleeing the Nazi-perpetrated Holocaust. A Turkish diplomat, Selahattin Ulkumen, is honoured as one of the Righteous Among The Nations for his work in rescuing Jews from Nazi officials on the island of Rhodes, by issuing them Turkish visas and later arranging for their transport to Turkish territory. Another diplomat, Necdet Kent, also rescued Jews from Nazi authorities, for which he was awarded a special medal by the government of the State of Israel.; Turkey was the first country with a Muslim majority to formally recognize the State of Israel.; The founders of the State of Israel and prominent Israeli politicians such as David Ben-Gurion, Yitzhak Ben-Zvi, and Moshe Shertok had all studied in the leading Turkish schools of Istanbul in their youth, namely Galatasaray High School and Istanbul University. | ✓ |
| Jordan | 11 January 1947 | See Jordan–Turkey relations: Jordan has an embassy in Ankara.; Turkey has an embassy in Amman.; Trade volume between the two countries was 962 million USD in 2015 (Turkish exports/imports: 835/127 million USD).; 474,874 Jordanian tourists visited Turkey in 2019.; Free Trade Agreement went into force on 11 March.; Yunus Emre Institute has a local branch in Amman. | X |
| Kuwait | 10 January 1964 | See Kuwait–Turkey relations: Kuwait has an embassy in Ankara.; Turkey has an embassy in Kuwait City.; Trade volume between the two countries was 678 million USD in 2018 (Turkish exports/imports: 534/144 million USD).; 374,191 Kuwaiti tourists visited Turkey in 2018. | X |
| Lebanon | 8 March 1946 | See Lebanon–Turkey relations Both countries established diplomatic relations on 8 March 1946.: Lebanon has an embassy in Ankara and a consulate general in Istanbul.; Turkey has an embassy in Beirut.; Trade volume between the two countries was 1070 million USD in 2018 (Turkish exports/imports: 901/169 million USD).; 376,721 Lebanese tourists visited Turkey in 2019.; Yunus Emre Institute has a local branch in Beirut. | Pending Ratification |
| Oman | 18 June 1973 | See Oman–Turkey relations: Oman has an embassy in Ankara.; Turkey has an embassy in Muscat.; Trade volume between the two countries was 489 million USD in 2018 (Turkish exports/imports: 422/67 million USD). | X |
| Palestine | 15 November 1988 | See Palestine–Turkey relations: Palestine has an embassy in Ankara.; Turkey has a consulate general in Jerusalem accredited to Palestine.; Trade volume between the two countries was 84 million USD in 2015 (Turkish exports/imports: 82/2 million USD).; Yunus Emre Institute has local branches in Jerusalem and Ramallah. | ✓ |
| Qatar | 20 March 1973 | See Qatar–Turkey relations: Turkey has an embassy in Doha.; United Arab Emirates has an embassy in Ankara and a consulate general in Istanbul.; Trade volume between the two countries was 1.4 billion USD in 2018.; Turkey has a military base in Qatar.; Yunus Emre Institute has a local branch in Doha. | X |
| Saudi Arabia | 3 August 1929 | See Saudi Arabia–Turkey relations: Saudi Arabia has an embassy in Ankara and a consulate general in Istanbul.; Turkey has an embassy in Riyadh and a consulate general in Jeddah.; Trade volume between the two countries was 4.96 billion USD in 2018 (Turkish exports/imports: 2.64/2.32 billion USD).; 564,816 Saudi tourists visited Turkey in 2019. | X |
| Syria | 8 March 1946 | See Syria–Turkey relations Both countries established diplomatic relations on 8 March 1946. | ✓ |
| United Arab Emirates | 1971 | See Turkey–United Arab Emirates relations: United Arab Emirates has an embassy in Ankara and a consulate general in Istanbul.; Turkey has an embassy in Abu Dhabi and a consulate general in Dubai.; Trade volume between the two countries was 6.92 billion USD in 2018 (Turkish exports/imports: 3.14/3.78 million USD). | X |
| Yemen | 4 March 1946 | See Turkey–Yemen relations: Yemen has an embassy in Ankara.; Turkey has an embassy in Sanaa.; Trade volume between the two countries was negligible in 2018. | X |

=== Europe ===
| Country/Region | Relations began | Notes | Free trade agreement |
|---|---|---|---|
| Albania | 15 December 1923 | See Albania–Turkey relations: Albania has an embassy in Ankara and a consulate general in Istanbul.; Turkey has an embassy in Tirana.; Both countries are members of OIC, NATO and WTO.; Trade volume between the two countries was 430 million USD in 2018 (Turkish exports/imports: 408/22 million USD).; 125,935 Albanian tourists visited Turkey in 2018.; Yunus Emre Institute has local branches in Shkoder and Tirana; There are over 500,000 Albanians residing in Turkey. | ✓ |
| Andorra | 8 October 1998 | The Turkish ambassador in Madrid to Spain is also accredited to Andorra.; Trade volume between the two countries was 478 thousand USD in 2010 (Turkish exports/imports: 476/1.4 thousand USD). | ✓ |
| Austria | 1526 | See Austria–Turkey relations: Austria has an embassy in Ankara and a consulate general in Istanbul.; Turkey has an embassy in Vienna and Consulates General in Bregenz and Salzburg; Both countries are members of OECD and WTO.; Trade volume between the two countries was 2.43 billion USD in 2019 (Turkish exports/imports: 1.14/1.29 billion USD).; 401,475 Austrian tourists visited Turkey in 2019.; Yunus Emre Institute has a local branch in Vienna. | ✓ |
| Belarus | 25 March 1992 | See Belarus–Turkey relations: Belarus has an embassy in Ankara and a consulate general in Istanbul.; Turkey has an embassy in Minsk.; Both countries are members of OSCE.; Trade volume between the two countries was 691 million USD in 2019 (Turkish exports/imports: 531/160 million USD).; 258,419 Belarusian tourists visited Turkey in 2019. | X |
| Belgium | 1838 | See Belgium–Turkey relations: Belgium has an embassy in Ankara and a consulate general in Istanbul.; Turkey has an embassy in Brussels and a consulate general in Antwerp.; Both countries are members of OECD, NATO and WTO.; Trade volume between the two countries was 5.7 billion USD in 2015 (Turkish exports/imports: 2.6/3.1 billion USD).; 220 thousand Turkish citizens reside in Belgium. See Turks in Belgium; 557,435 Belgian tourists visited Turkey in 2019.; Yunus Emre Institute has a local branch in Brussels. | ✓ |
| Bulgaria | 1908 | See Bulgaria–Turkey relations: Bulgaria has an embassy in Ankara and Consulates General in Bursa, Edirne and Istanbul.; Turkey has an embassy in Sofia and a consulate general in Burgas. and Plovdiv.; Both countries are full members of the Council of Europe and NATO.; Trade volume between the two countries was 4.1 billion USD in 2017 (Turkish exports/imports: 2.1/2.0 billion USD).; 2,713,464 Bulgarian tourists visited Turkey in 2019. | ✓ |
| Bosnia and Herzegovina | 29 August 1992 | See Bosnia and Herzegovina–Turkey relations: Bosnia and Herzegovina has an embassy in Ankara.; Turkey has an embassy in Sarajevo.; Turkey supports Bosnia and Herzegovina's NATO membership.; Trade volume between the two countries was 661 million USD in 2018 (Turkish exports/imports: 420/241 million USD).; Yunus Emre Institute has local branches in Fojnica, Mostar and Sarajevo. | ✓ |
| Croatia | 6 August 1992 | See Croatia–Turkey relations: Croatia has an embassy in Ankara and Consulates General in Istanbul and İzmir.; Turkey has an embassy in Zagreb.; Both countries are members of NATO and WTO.; Trade volume between the two countries was 384 million USD in 2017 (Turkish exports/imports: 232/152 million USD).; Yunus Emre Institute has a local branch in Zagreb. | ✓ |
| Czech Republic | 1924 | See Czech Republic–Turkey relations: Czech Republic has an embassy in Ankara and a consulate general in Istanbul.; Turkey has an embassy in Prague.; Both countries are members of NATO, OECD and WTO.; Trade volume between the two countries was 3.65 billion USD in 2018 (Turkish exports/imports: 1/2.65 billion USD).; 4,500 Turkish citizens reside in the Czech Republic.; 311,359 Czech tourists visited Turkey in 2019. | ✓ |
| Denmark | 1756 | See Denmark–Turkey relations: Denmark has an embassy in Ankara and a consulate general in Istanbul.; Turkey has an embassy in Copenhagen.; Both countries are members of NATO, OECD and WTO.; Trade volume between the two countries was 1.88 billion USD in 2018 (Turkish exports/imports: 1.1/0.81 billion USD).; 70 thousand Turkish citizens reside in Denmark. See Turks in Denmark; 335,877 Danish tourists visited Turkey in 2018. | ✓ |
| Estonia | 1924 | See Estonia–Turkey relations: Estonia has an embassy in Ankara.; Turkey has an embassy in Tallinn.; Both countries are members of OECD, NATO and WTO.; Trade volume between the two countries was 312 million USD in 2018 (Turkish exports/imports: 92/220 million USD).; 77,041 Estonian tourists visited Turkey in 2019.; 575 Turkish citizens live in Estonia. | ✓ |
| Finland | 1924 | See Finland–Turkey relations: Finland has an embassy in Ankara.; Turkey has an embassy in Helsinki.; Both countries are members of OECD, NATO and WTO.; Turkey did not support Finland's accession to NATO until March 2023, but accepted its participation.; Trade volume between the two countries was 1.32 billion USD in 2018 (Turkish exports/imports: 0.34/0.98 billion USD).; 13 thousand Turkish citizens reside in Finland. See Turks in Finland; 135,192 Finnish tourists visited Turkey in 2018. | ✓ |
| France | 1483 | See France–Turkey relations: France has an embassy in Ankara and a consulate general in Istanbul.; Turkey has an embassy in Paris and Consulates General in Bordeaux, Lyon, Marseille, Nantes and Strasbourg.; Both countries are members of G20, NATO, OECD and WTO.; Trade volume between the two countries was 13.4 billion USD in 2015 (Turkish exports/imports: 5.8/7.6 billion USD).; 650 thousand Turkish citizens reside in France and 3,152 French citizens reside in Turkey.; 875,957 French tourists visited Turkey in 2019.; Yunus Emre Institute has a local branch in Paris. | ✓ |
| Germany | 1790 | See Germany–Turkey relations: Germany has an embassy in Ankara and Consulates General in Antalya, Istanbul and İzmir.; Turkey has an embassy in Berlin and Consulates General in Cologne, Düsseldorf, Essen, Frankfurt, Hamburg Hanover, Karlsruhe Mainz, Munich, Münster, Nuremberg and Stuttgart.; Both countries are members of G20, NATO, OECD and WTO.; Trade volume between the two countries was 35.9 billion USD in 2018 (Turkish exports/imports: 16.6/19.3 billion USD).; 3 million people of Turkish origin reside in Germany.; 5,027,472 German tourists visited Turkey in 2019.; Relations with Turkey significantly deteriorated after the 2016–17 Turkish purges and Turkey's turn to authoritarianism, including the arrest of journalists such as Die Welt's Deniz Yücel.; Yunus Emre Institute has local branches in Berlin and Cologne. | ✓ |
| Greece | 24 August 1833 | See Greece-Turkey relations Greek Prime Minister George Papandreou and Turkish Prime Minister Recep Tayyip Erdoğan in Ankara, November 2009: Greece has an embassy in Ankara and Consulates General in Edirne, Istanbul and İzmir.; Turkey has an embassy in Athens and Consulates General in Komotini, Piraeus, Rhodes and Thessaloniki.; Both countries are members of BSEC, OECD, NATO and WTO.; Trade volume between the two countries was 4.18 billion USD in 2018.; 150 thousand muslims that Turkey claims are "ethnic Turks" reside in Western Thrace, Greece.; 836,882 Greek tourists visited Turkey in 2019.; Turkey and Greece have clashed for decades over the status of Aegean islands and over the extent of territorial waters and airspace. In February 1999, the discovery that Greek authorities had been aiding and abetting Abdullah Öcalan, Turkey's most wanted criminal, caused a diplomatic crisis. When Abdullah Öcalan was captured by Turkish authorities, he was found holding Greek and Cypriot passports, and he later revealed that he had been hiding in the Greek Embassy in Nairobi, Kenya. Relations have since improved, particularly following the earthquakes that struck both countries in 1999. | ✓ |
| Holy See | 1960 | See Holy See–Turkey relations: The Holy See has a nunciature in Ankara.; Turkey has an embassy in Rome accredited to the Holy See.; Trade volume between the two countries was negligible in 2018. | X |
| Hungary | 1521 | See Hungary–Turkey relations: Hungary has an embassy in Ankara and a consulate general in Istanbul.; Turkey has an embassy in Budapest.; Both countries are members of NATO, OECD and WTO. Hungary is an observer in the Turkic Council.; Trade volume between the two countries was 2.5 billion USD in 2018 (Turkish exports/imports: 1.16/1.4 billion USD).; 149,523 Hungarian tourists visited Turkey in 2019.; 2,600 Turkish citizens reside in Hungary.; Yunus Emre Institute has a local branch in Budapest. | ✓ |
| Iceland | 17 June 1944 | See Iceland–Turkey relations: Icelandic Embassy in Copenhagen is accredited to Turkey.; Turkey has an embassy in Reykjavík.; Both countries are members of NATO, OECD and WTO.; Trade volume between the two countries was 51 million USD in 2018 (Turkish exports/imports: 24/27 million USD).; 100 Turkish citizens reside in Iceland. | ✓ |
| Ireland | 2 October 1951 | See Ireland–Turkey relations: Ireland has an embassy in Ankara.; Turkey has an embassy in Dublin.; Both countries are members of OECD and WTO.; Trade volume between the two countries was 1.5 billion USD in 2017 (Turkish exports/imports: 528/970 million USD).; 1,800 Turkish citizens reside in Ireland.; 118,620 Irish tourists visited Turkey in 2011.; Yunus Emre Institute has a local branch in Dublin. | ✓ |
| Italy | 25 September 1856 | See Italy–Turkey relations: Italy has an embassy in Ankara and Consulates General in Istanbul and İzmir.; Turkey has an embassy in Rome and a consulate general in Milan; Both countries are members of G20, NATO, OECD and WTO.; Trade volume between the two countries was 19.7 billion USD in 2017 (Turkish exports/imports: 8.47/11.3 billion USD).; 205,788 Italian tourists visited Turkey in 2017.; Yunus Emre Institute has a local branch in Rome. | ✓ |
| Kosovo | 18 February 2008 | See Kosovo–Turkey relations: Kosovo has an embassy in Ankara and a consulate general in Istanbul.; Turkey has an embassy in Pristina and a consulate general in Prizren.; Trade volume between the two countries was 249 million USD in 2015 (Turkish exports/imports: 241/7 million USD).; Yunus Emre Institute has local branches in Peja, Pristina and Prizren. | ✓ |
| Latvia | 1925 | See Latvia–Turkey relations: Latvia has an embassy in Ankara.; Turkey has an embassy in Riga.; Both countries are members of OECD, NATO and WTO.; 200 Turkish citizens reside in Latvia.; Trade volume between the two countries was 291 million USD in 2018 (Turkish exports/imports: 126/165 million USD).; 86,051 Latvian tourists visited Turkey in 2019. | ✓ |
| Liechtenstein | 2 October 1992 | Bilateral relations between Turkey and Liechtenstein are being coordinated by the Embassies of the Republic of Turkey and Liechtenstein in Bern.; Both countries are members of WTO.; Trade volume between the two countries was 7 million USD in 2017. | ✓ |
| Lithuania | 1930 | See Lithuania–Turkey relations: Lithuania has an embassy in Ankara.; Turkey has an embassy in Vilnius.; Both countries are members of OECD, NATO and WTO.; Trade volume between the two countries was 687 million USD in 2018 (Turkish exports/imports: 277/410 million USD).; 229,704 Lithuanian tourists visited Turkey in 2019.; 350 Turkish citizens reside in Lithuania. | ✓ |
| Luxembourg | 10 July 1946 | See Luxembourg–Turkey relations: Luxembourg has an embassy in Ankara.; Turkey has an embassy in Luxembourg.; Both countries are members of NATO, OECD and WTO.; Trade volume between the two countries was 160 million USD in 2017 (Turkish exports/imports: 36/124 million USD).; 900 Turkish citizens reside in Luxembourg. | ✓ |
| Malta | 10 October 1967 | See Malta–Turkey relations: Malta has an embassy in Ankara and a consulate general in Istanbul.; Turkey has an embassy in Valletta.; Both countries are members of WTO.; Trade volume between the two countries was 593 million USD in 2017 (Turkish exports/imports: 541/52 million USD). | ✓ |
| Moldova | 3 February 1992 | See Moldova–Turkey relations: Moldova has an embassy in Ankara and a consulate general in Istanbul.; Turkey has an embassy in Chișinău and a consulate general in Comrat.; Comrat is the capital of Gagauzia, an autonomous region populated by the Gagauz, an Orthodox Christian Turkic people, the region hence acting as a bridge to Turkey and Russia. As a response internal challenges to Gagauzia's autonomy, Mikhail Formuzal, President of People's Assembly in Comrat is seeking Turkey's aid to defend Gagauz culture and identity.; Both countries are members of BSEC.; Trade volume between the two countries was 568 million USD in 2019 (Turkish exports/imports: 322/246 million USD).; Yunus Emre Institute has a local branch in Comrat. | ✓ |
| Monaco | 1954 | See Monaco–Turkey relations: Bilateral relations between Turkey and Monaco are being coordinated by the Consulates General of Turkey and Monaco in Marseille.; Trade volume between the two countries was 15.1 million USD in 2017. | ✓ |
| Montenegro | 3 July 2006 | See Montenegro–Turkey relations: Montenegro has an embassy in Ankara and a consulate general in Istanbul.; Turkey has an embassy in Podgorica.; Trade volume between the two countries was 46 million USD in 2015.; Yunus Emre Institute has a local branch in Podgorica. | ✓ |
| Netherlands | 1612 | See Netherlands–Turkey relations: Netherlands has an embassy in Ankara and a consulate general in Istanbul.; Turkey has an embassy in The Hague and Consulates General in Amsterdam, Deventer and Rotterdam.; Both countries are members of NATO, OECD and WTO.; Trade volume between the two countries was 8.97 billion USD in 2019 (Turkish exports/imports: 5.76/3.20 billion USD).; 500 thousand people of Turkish origin reside in the Netherlands.; 1,117,290 Dutch tourists visited Turkey in 2019.; Yunus Emre Institute has a local branch in Amsterdam. | ✓ |
| North Macedonia | 26 August 1992. | See North Macedonia–Turkey relations: North Macedonia has an embassy in Ankara and a consulate general in Istanbul.; Turkey has an embassy in Skopje and a consulate general in Bitola.; Both countries are members of NATO.; Trade volume between the two countries was 503 million USD in 2018 (Turkish exports/imports: 396/107 million USD).; 209,519 Macedonian tourists visited Turkey in 2018.; Yunus Emre Institute has a local branch in Skopje. | ✓ |
| Norway | 1926 | See Norway-Turkey relations: Norway has an embassy in Ankara and a consulate general in Istanbul.; Both countries are members of NATO, OECD and WTO.; Trade volume between the two countries was 1.28 billion USD in 2018 (Turkish exports/imports: 513/765 million USD).; 20 thousand Turkish citizens reside in Norway .; 208,330 Norwegian tourists visited Turkey in 2019. | ✓ |
| Poland | 1414 | See Poland–Turkey relations: Poland has an embassy in Ankara and a consulate general in Istanbul.; Turkey has an embassy in Warsaw.; Both countries are members of NATO, OECD and WTO.; Trade volume between the two countries was 6.45 billion USD in 2018 (Turkish exports/imports: 3.34/3.34 billion USD).; 880,839 Polish tourists visited Turkey in 2018. | ✓ See also Polonezköy |
| Portugal | 1843 | See Portugal–Turkey relations: Portugal has an embassy in Ankara.; Turkey has an embassy in Lisbon.; Both countries are members of NATO, OECD and WTO. Turkey is an observer in Lusophone Commonwealth.; Trade volume between the two countries was 1.5 billion USD in 2017 (Turkish exports/imports: 811/684 million USD).; 54,130 Portuguese tourists visited Turkey in 2019. | ✓ |
| Romania | 22 October 1879 | See Romania–Turkey relations: Romania has an embassy in Ankara and Consulates General in Istanbul and İzmir.; Turkey has an embassy in Bucharest and a consulate general in Constanţa.; Both countries are members of BSEC, NATO and WTO.; Trade volume between the two countries was 5.4 billion USD in 2015 (Turkish exports/imports: 2.8/2.6 billion USD).; 763,320 Romanian tourists visited Turkey in 2019.; Yunus Emre Institute has local branches in Bucharest and Constanța. | ✓ |
| Russia | 1699 | See Russia–Turkey relations President Erdoğan meets with Russian President Vladimir Putin in July 2024: Russia has an embassy in Ankara and Consulates General in Antalya, Istanbul and Trabzon.; Turkey has an embassy in Moscow and Consulates General in Kazan Novorossiysk and Saint Petersburg.; Both countries are members of BSEC, G20 and WTO.; Trade volume between the two countries was 26.3 billion USD in 2019 (Turkish exports/imports: 3.85/22.4 billion USD).; 7,017,657 Russian tourists visited Turkey in 2019.; Yunus Emre Institute has local branches in Kazan and Moscow. | X |
| Serbia | 1879 | See Serbia–Turkey relations: Serbia has an embassy in Ankara and a consulate general in Istanbul.; Turkey has an embassy in Belgrade.; Both countries are members of BSEC, Central European Free Trade Agreement and WTO.; Trade volume between the two countries was 731 million USD in 2015 (Turkish exports/imports: 493/328 million USD).; 282,347Serbian tourists visited Turkey in 2019.; Yunus Emre Institute has a local branch in Belgrade. | ✓ |
| Slovakia | 1993 | See Slovakia–Turkey relations: Slovakia has an embassy in Ankara and a consulate general in Istanbul.; Turkey has an embassy in Bratislava.; Both countries are members of OECD, NATO and WTO.; Trade volume between the two countries was 1.29 billion USD in 2018 (Turkish exports/imports: 532/767 million USD).; 207,108 Slovak tourists visited Turkey in 2019. | ✓ |
| Slovenia | 6 February 1992 | See Slovenia–Turkey relations: Slovenia has an embassy in Ankara and a consulate general in Istanbul.; Turkey has an embassy in Ljubljana.; Both countries are members of OECD, NATO and WTO.; Trade volume between the two countries was 1.15 million USD in 2015.; 50,414 Slovenian tourists visited Turkey in 2019. | ✓ |
| Spain | 1782 | See Spain–Turkey relations: Spain has an embassy in Ankara and a consulate general in Istanbul.; Turkey has an embassy in Madrid and a consulate general in Barcelona.; Both countries are members of OECD, NATO and WTO.; Trade volume between the two countries was 12.7 billion USD in 2017 (Turkish exports/imports: 6.3/6.4 billion USD).; 257,342 Spanish tourists visited Turkey in 2019.; Yunus Emre Institute has a local branch in Madrid. | ✓ |
| Sweden | 1603 | See Sweden–Turkey relations: Sweden has an embassy in Ankara and a consulate general in Istanbul.; Turkey has an embassy in Stockholm.; Both countries are members of OECD, NATO and WTO.; Turkey did not support Sweden's accession to NATO until January 2024, but accepted its participation.; Trade volume between the two countries was 3.2 billion USD in 2018 (Turkish exports/imports: 1.5/1.7 billion USD).; 115 thousand people of Turkish origin reside in Sweden. See also Turks in Sweden; 444,285 Swedish tourists visited Turkey in 2019. | ✓ |
| Switzerland | 1899 | See Switzerland–Turkey relations: Switzerland has an embassy in Ankara and a consulate general in Istanbul.; Turkey has an embassy in Bern and Consulates General in Geneva and Zürich.; Both countries are members of OECD and WTO.; Trade volume between the two countries was 4.41 billion USD in 2019 (Turkish exports/imports: 1.04/3.38 billion USD).; 130 thousand Turkish citizens reside in Switzerland.; 314,572 Swiss tourists visited Turkey in 2019. | ✓ |
| Ukraine | 3 February 1992 | See Turkey–Ukraine relations: Ukraine has an embassy in Ankara and Consulates General in Antalya and Istanbul.; Turkey has an embassy in Kyiv and a consulate general in Odesa.; Both countries are members of WTO.; Turkey supports Ukraine's NATO membership.; Trade volume between the two countries was 4.8 billion USD in 2019 (Turkish exports/imports: 2.1/2.72 billion USD).; 1,547,996 Ukrainian tourists visited Turkey in 2019.; Yunus Emre Institute has a local branch in Kyiv. | Pending Ratification |
| United Kingdom | 2 September 1924 | See Turkey–United Kingdom relations Prime Minister Keir Starmer with Turkish President Recep Tayyip Erdoğan in Ankara, October 2025.: Turkey maintains an embassy in London, and consulates generals in Edinburgh, London and Manchester.; The United Kingdom is accredited to Turkey through its embassy in Ankara, a consulate general in Istanbul, and an honorary vice consulate in Antalya. The United Kingdom also has a consulate in İzmir, and honorary consulates in Bodrum, Fethiye, and Marmaris.; Both countries share common membership of the Coalition of the Willing, the Council of Europe, the G20, NATO, the OECD, the OSCE, the United Nations, the World Health Organization, and the World Trade Organization. Bilaterally the two countries have a Double Taxation Agreement, an Investment Agreement, and a Trade Agreement. Both countries are negotiating a new Free Trade Agreement.: 250 thousand Turkish citizens reside in the United Kingdom.; 2,562,064 British tourists visited Turkey in 2019.; Yunus Emre Institute has a local branch in London. | ✓ |

== International organizations ==
- ASEAN (Sectoral Dialogue Partner)
- ACD
- ADB
- Australia Group
- BIS
- Black Sea Naval Force
- BSEC
- CE
- Community of Portuguese Language Countries (observer)
- Developing-8
- EBRD
- G20
- IAEA
- IBRD
- International Energy Agency
- NATO
- NEA
- NSG
- OECD
- OIC
- OSCE
- Turkic Council
- TURKPA
- TÜRKSOY
- UfM

Turkey is a founding member of the UN (1945), the Organization for Economic Co-operation and Development (1961), the Organization of Islamic Cooperation (1969), the Organization for Security and Co-operation in Europe (OSCE) (1973), and the G20 industrial nations (1999). Turkey is a member state of the Council of Europe (1949) and NATO (1952) as well as being in full accession negotiations with the European Union since 2005, having been an associate member since 1963. Turkey was also an associate member of the Western European Union from 1992 to 2011, and signed the E.U. Customs Union agreement in 1995.

Turkey entered NATO in 1952 and serves as a strategic eastern anchor. Its strategic importance lies in its control of the Turkish Straits, which lead from the Black Sea to the Mediterranean and its borders with Syria, Iraq, and Iran. A NATO headquarters is located in İzmir and the United States has maintained a military presence via the Incirlik Air Base in the province of Adana.

Turkey is also a member of the World Trade Organization (WTO) since 1995. It has signed free trade agreements with the European Free Trade Association (EFTA), Israel, and many other countries. In 1992, Turkey and 10 other regional nations formed the BSEC to expand regional trade and economic cooperation. In 2017, ASEAN-Turkey Sectoral Dialogue Partnership was recognized by the 50th ASEAN Foreign Ministers' Meeting in Manila, Philippines.

== See also ==
- List of diplomatic missions in Turkey
- List of diplomatic missions of Turkey
- Turkey's membership of international organizations
- Visa requirements for Turkish citizens
