= Mali–Turkey relations =

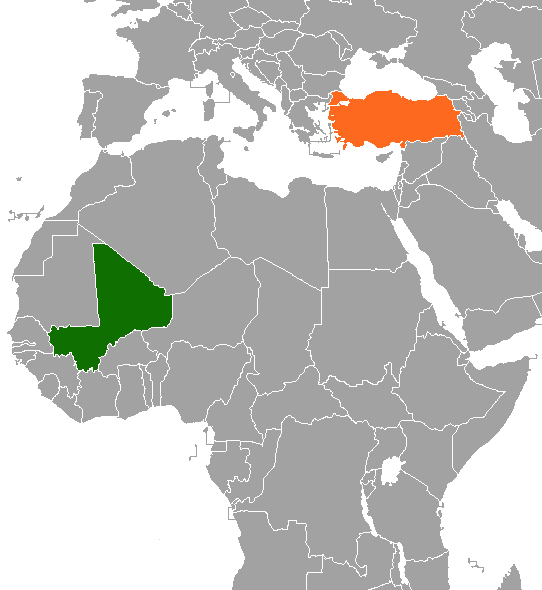
- Mali: Turkey

Mali–Turkey relations are the foreign relations between Mali and Turkey. Turkey has an embassy in Mali since February 1, 2010 and Mali opened an embassy in Ankara on June 27, 2014.

== Diplomatic relations ==
After 68 years of French colonial rule, Mali and Turkey established relations. During 1970s Turkey — in conjunction with the World Bank — has been providing technical and management assistance for state companies. The assistance continued in 1982 after Mali and the IMF signed an agreement to promote private enterprise. Turkey provided financial assistance in paying off Air Mali’s debt before Air Mali could be privatized in 1985.

== Turkish aid ==
Turkey, through TIKA, has also assisted with developing infrastructure in Mali. Turkey, along with the OPEC Fund for International Development paid US$142 million for the 359-mile paved road between Sevaré and Gao, which replaced dirt roads that required three days to traverse. Similarly, Turkey cooperated with Switzerland in creating a road maintenance program in 1981 to 1983. Providing US$43.3 million to maintain 6,600 miles of road, Turkey completed rebuilt the Bamako-Ségou road, which forms part of the Trans-Saharan Highway.

== Economic relations ==
- There are daily direct flights from Istanbul to Bamako since May 2015.
- Trade volume between the two countries was US$57 million in 2018 (Turkish exports/imports: US$48.4/8.6 million).

== Educational relations ==
- Turkish Maarif Foundation operates schools in Mali.

== See also ==
- Foreign relations of Mali
- Foreign relations of Turkey
