= Maldives–Turkey relations =

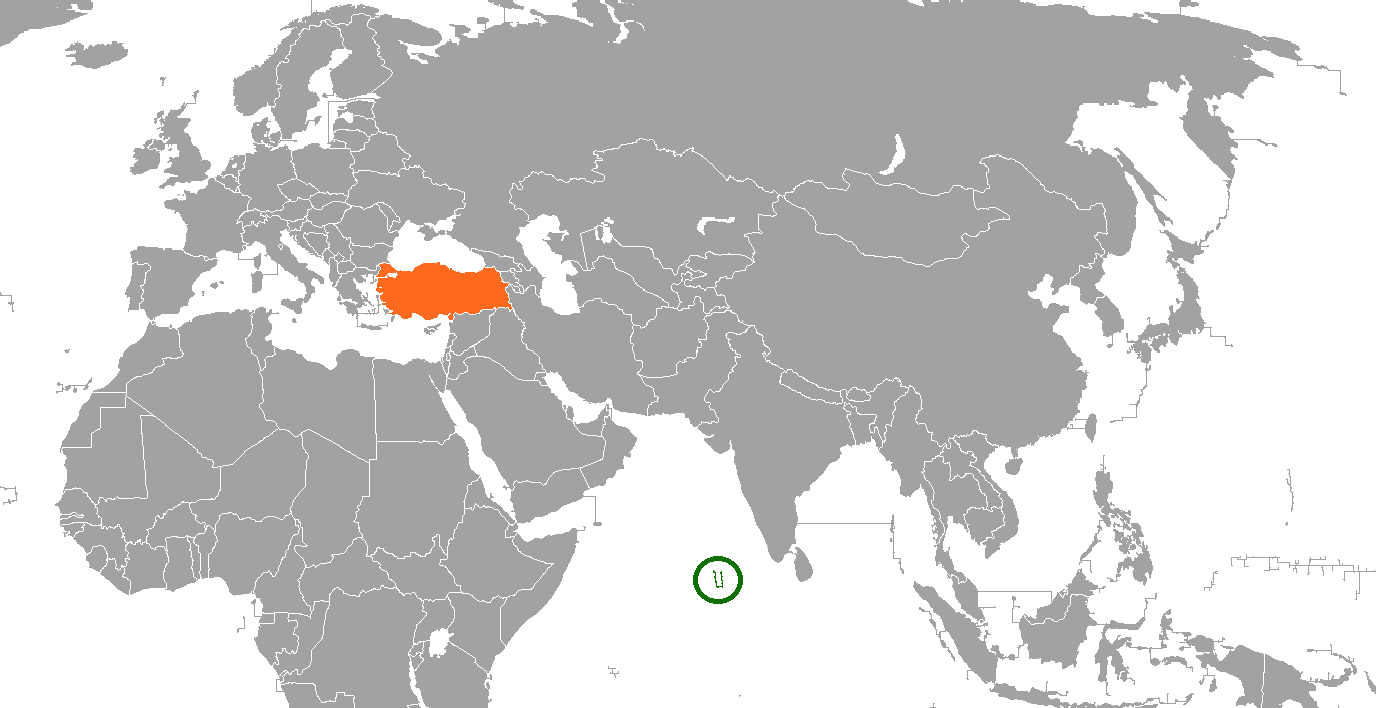
- Maldives: Turkey

Diplomatic relations between the Maldives and Turkey were established in 1979. The Turkish Embassy in New Delhi, India is accredited to the Maldives and the Permanent Mission of the Republic of Maldives to the United Nations Office in Geneva is accredited to Turkey. The two countries have good relations between them mostly in the areas of tourism and defence, while being in close cooperation with one another on international platforms including the United Nations and Organisation of Islamic Cooperation (OIC).

== History ==
Maldives has benefitted from assistance rendered by Turkey, especially in the aftermath of the 2004 Indian Ocean earthquake and tsunami. In 2019, in a visit of the Maldivian minister of home affairs Imran Abdulla to Ankara, Turkey vowed to assist with the prison reform in Maldives.

== Diplomatic visits ==
The first official visit from Turkey to the Maldives since the establishment of diplomatic relations was on 9 February 2005, when Prime Minister Erdoğan visited the Maldives in the aftermath of the earthquake and the tsunami disaster in South East Asia on 26 December 2004. The visit to Turkey by Maldivian foreign minister Abdulla Shahid on 15–21 April 2008, was the first official visit from the Maldives to Turkey.

== Economic relations ==
Trade volume between the two countries was US$46.5 million in 2019. There are no bilateral economic cooperation mechanisms between the two countries.

== See also ==
- Foreign relations of the Maldives
- Foreign relations of Turkey
