= Kenya–Turkey relations =

- Kenya: Turkey

Kenya–Turkey relations are bilateral relations between Kenya and Turkey. Turkey has an embassy in Nairobi which was opened in 1968. Kenya has an embassy in Ankara.

== History ==
Kenyan–Turkish relations can be traced back to the 16th century where they first started to trade goods. Former President Daniel Arap Moi visited Turkey in 1996 and the President of the Republic of Turkey Abdullah Gül made his first trip in Sub-Saharan Africa to Kenya in February 2009. President Uhuru Kenyatta visited Turkey in April 2014. The second meeting of the Turkey–Kenya Joint Economic Commission was also held prior to the visit. During the visit of President Kenyatta 10 bilateral agreements in different areas were signed.

Both countries have agreed that to prioritise trade, industrialisation, transport, agriculture, tourism, education, health, immigration, science and technology, and development of arid lands.

== Development cooperation ==
Turkey is seeking Kenya as an entry point to the Grand Free Trade Area planned by the East Africa Community Common Market for Eastern and Central Africa (Comesa) and the South Africa Development Community starting mid-2014.

Kenya is eyeing Turkey as a potential large scale buyer of its tea, coffee and flowers. It is also targeting Turkey as a market for diversified goods in line with the new export plan launched in May.

The Joint Trade Commission envisaged that Turkey would establish an Export Processing Zone in Nairobi as part of its outreach efforts to the regional market.

== Official visits ==
Guest	Host	Place of visit	Date of visit
(Turkey) President Recep Tayyip Erdoğan	(Kenya) President Uhuru Kenyatta	Nairobi	June 1–3, 2016
(Kenya) President Uhuru Kenyatta	(Turkey) President Recep Tayyip Erdoğan	Ankara	April __, 2014
(Turkey) President Abdullah Gül	(Kenya) President Daniel arap Moi	Nairobi	February, 2009
(Kenya) President Daniel arap Moi	(Turkey) President Süleyman Demirel	Ankara	1996

== Trade ==
Bilateral trade volume reached the level of US$145 million in 2013.

Turkey's goods exports to Kenya in 2012 were $138 million, $199 million in 2011, exports were up by 1607% from 2002.

Kenya exported goods worth $17 million in 2012, $14.7 million in 2011, imports were up by 781% from 2002.

The trade surplus of goods with Turkey was $120.1 million in 2012, a 53.5% decrease $184.4 million over 2011. Meaning that trade between both countries were more balanced.

Numerous companies from Turkey especially those involved in construction have operations in Kenya.

Turkey targeted to grow the volume of bilateral trade with Kenya to a worth of $500 million.
