= Malawi–Turkey relations =

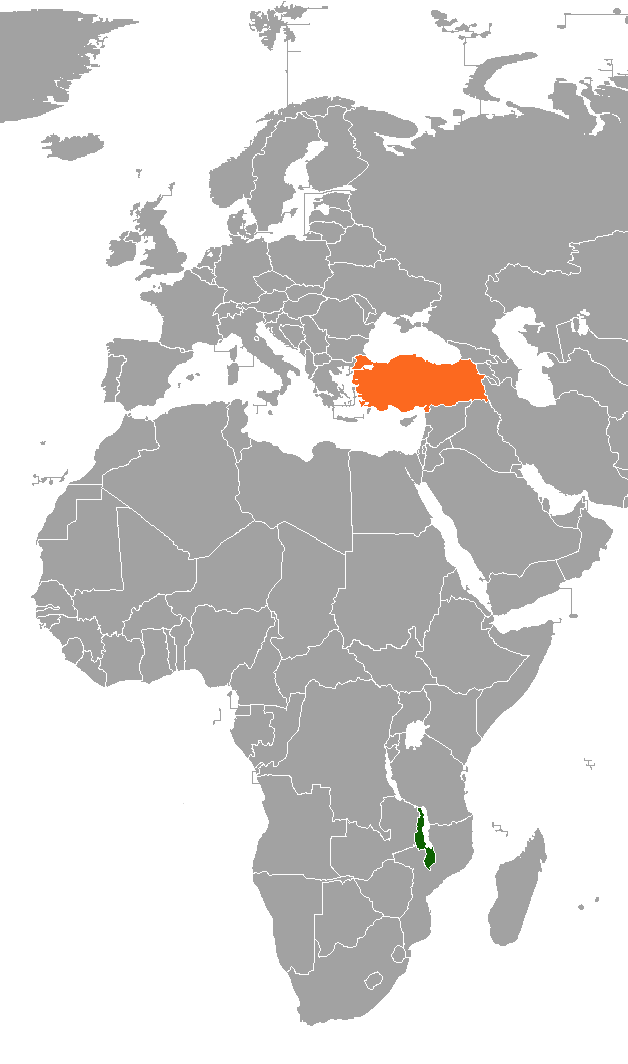
- Malawi: Turkey

Malawi–Turkey relations are foreign relations between Malawi and Turkey. The Turkish ambassador in Lusaka, Zambia is also accredited to Malawi. Malawi is accredited to Turkey from its embassy in Berlin, Germany. Turkey has plans to open an embassy in Lilongwe.

== History ==
During the talks discussing the creation of the Federation of Rhodesia and Nyasaland, the black majority in Malawi did not support the federation, arguing that the federation would benefit the European settlers and not Africans. Turkey expressed concern when Federation of Rhodesia and Nyasaland was established in 1953 and supported Nyasaland African Congress, which aimed to create a majority-rule country, diplomatically. In 1958, Dr. Hastings Banda, a member of Nyasaland African Congress, was sent to prison. Turkey supported the Devlin Commission of 1959 that exonerated Hastings Banda.

Following declaring independence, Turkey has provided limited economic assistance to Malawi, where there was a climate of political and economic stability.

== Economic relations ==
- Trade volume between the two countries was US$21 million in 2019 (Turkish exports/imports: US$4.7/16.4 million).

== See also ==
- Foreign relations of Malawi
- Foreign relations of Turkey
