= Brunei–Turkey relations =

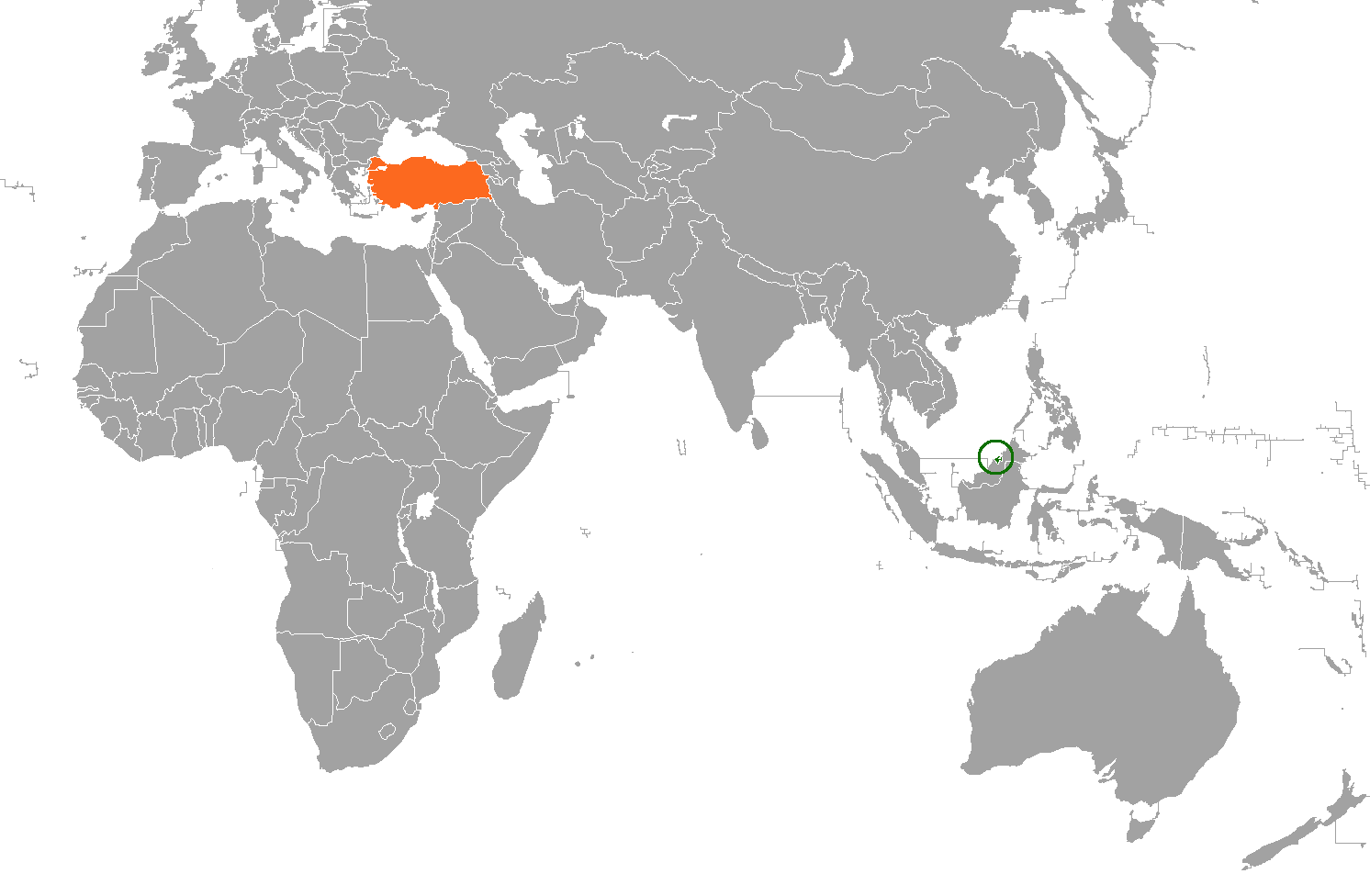

- Brunei: Turkey

Diplomatic mission
- Bruneian embassy, Ankara: Turkish embassy, Bandar Seri Begawan

Brunei–Turkey relations are the bilateral relations between Brunei and Turkey. Relations are close because they are both Muslim-majority countries, and are part of the Organisation of Islamic Cooperation. Turkey has an embassy in Bandar Seri Begawan since October 15, 2013. Brunei opened its embassy in Ankara on January 8, 2014.

== Diplomatic relations ==
Turkey's support for Brunei started even before the independence, when it offered help when the Brunei Rebellion broke out on December 8, 1962. The revolt through British support was crushed within a week.

Turkey has also been supportive in Brunei's decision to not enter into Malaysia in 1963 and Turkish diplomats conferred with the six-member Bruneian delegation to Kuala Lumpur. Turkey has similarly supported Brunei's introduction of constitutional reforms in 1963, including the restoration of the Legislative Council in the future, with the elections to be held in early 1965. The council was to consist of 21 members, ten of whom would be directly elected. The elections were held in March 1965 with 36 independent candidates running for the ten democratically elected positions.

With the Declaration of Independence in 1984, as a small state, Brunei's main concern became internal and external security. To that end, Turkey leveraged its friendly relations with Malaysia and Indonesia in supporting Brunei's admission into ASEAN as its sixth member in 1984.

Similarly, from 1987 to 1988, Turkish diplomats provided support for Brunei's bilateral relations with Malaysia and Indonesia, her two immediate neighbors, with whom Brunei historically has strained ties. Partly as a result of these efforts, relations with Malaysia and Indonesia improved dramatically, with Malaysian prime ministers Mahathir Mohamad and Yang di-Pertuan Agong making historical official visits to Brunei in 1987.

On 23 May 2024—one year after the brutal 2023 Turkey-Syria earthquake, the Bruneian government donated $500,000 to Turkish Disaster and Emergency Management Authority (AFAD) for post-earthquake recovery in Turkey.

== Diplomatic Visits ==
Guest	Host	Place of visit	Date of visit
(Brunei) Minister of Foreign Affairs Lim Jock Seng	(Turkey) Minister of Foreign Affairs Mevlüt Çavuşoğlu	Çankaya Köşkü, Ankara	April 5, 2012
(Brunei) Sultan Hassanal Bolkiah	(Turkey) President Abdullah Gül	Çankaya Köşkü, Ankara	April 8–10, 2012
(Turkey) Prime Minister Recep Tayyip Erdoğan	(Brunei) Sultan Hassanal Bolkiah	Istana Nurul Iman, Bandar Seri Begawan	November 9–10, 2012
(Brunei) Sultan Hassanal Bolkiah	(Turkey) President Recep Tayyip Erdoğan	Islamic Summit Conference, Istanbul	April 14–15, 2016
(Turkey) Minister of Foreign Affairs Mevlüt Çavuşoğlu	(Brunei) Sultan Hassanal Bolkiah	Istana Nurul Iman, Bandar Seri Begawan	November 6–7, 2018

== Economic relations ==
- Trade volume between the two countries was US$4.9 million in 2018 (Turkish exports/imports: US$4.8/0.1 million).

== See also ==
- Foreign relations of Brunei
- Foreign relations of Turkey
