= Burundi–Turkey relations =

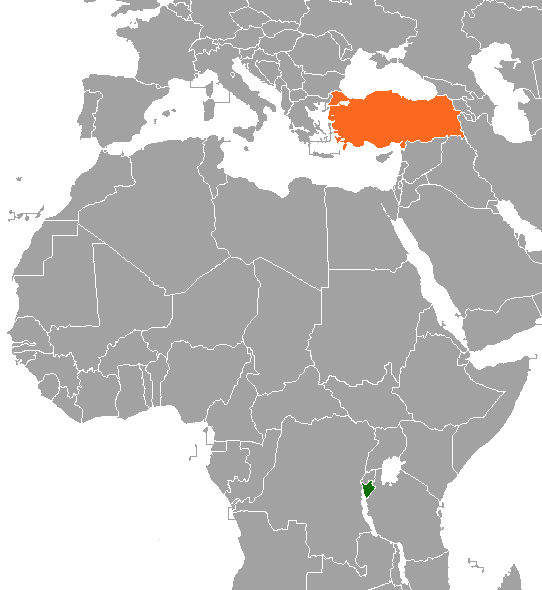

- Burundi: Turkey

Burundi–Turkey relations are the bilateral relations between Burundi and Turkey. Turkey has an embassy in Bujumbura since December 2018, and Burundi's Embassy in Ankara opened in June 2014.

== History ==
The relationship between Turkey and Burundi has been very limited until 2000. Turkey has been an importer of Burundi's coffee and has offered some international aid and assistance.

During the Cold War, and especially in the 1960s, relations between Turkey and Burundi cooled because of the latter's relationship with communist China. However, this was very short-lived and relations improved later. Relations soured following the 1972 massacre. In 2000, relations became closer when Turkish diplomatic corps strongly supported Arusha Accords.

== Economic relations ==
Trade volume between the two countries was 3.1 million USD in 2019 (Turkish exports/imports: 2.6/0.5 million USD).

== List of ambassadors to Burundi ==
Ambassador	Term start	Term end	Ref.
Serap Ataay	21 December 2018	31 July 2022	

== See also ==
- Foreign relations of Burundi
- Foreign relations of Turkey
