= Sierra Leone–Turkey relations =

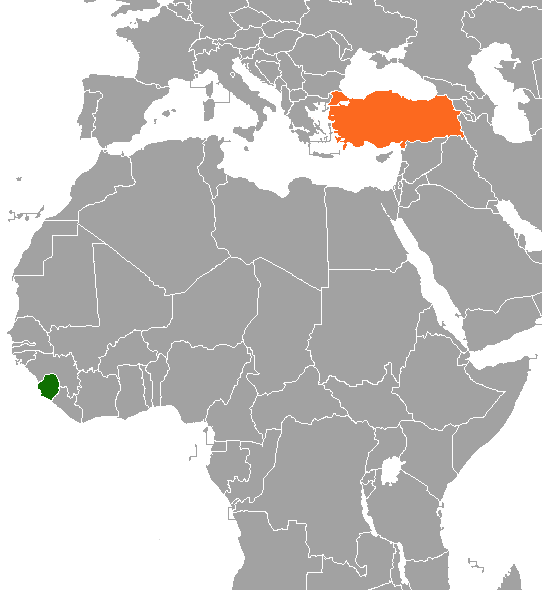
- Sierra Leone: Turkey

Sierra Leone–Turkey relations are the foreign relations between Sierra Leone and Turkey. Turkey has an embassy in Freetown since February 2018 and Sierra Leone has an embassy in Ankara since January 2020.

== Diplomatic relations ==
Sierra Leone and Turkey historically have had tense relations until recently. Turkey denounced Sierra Leone under Foday Sankoh, a Sierra Leonean who had trained as a guerrilla in Libya, because Foday Sankoh’s regime systematically turned children into murderers, force them to perform ritual cannibalism after amputating civilians’ arms and legs. To top it off, Foday Sankoh had been supplying cut-rate diamonds to al Qaeda, which Turkey classified as a terrorist organization, for resale in Europe. Turkey participated in the 6,000-man UN peacekeeping force, even though safety was not restored for a very long time.

== Economic relations ==
- Trade volume between the two countries was US$53.4 million in 2019.
- There are direct flights from Istanbul to Freetown.

== See also ==
- Foreign relations of Sierra Leone
- Foreign relations of Turkey
