= South Sudan–Turkey relations =

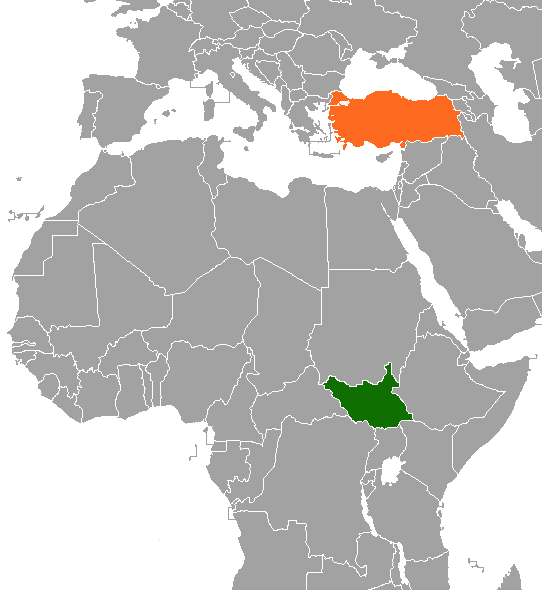

- South Sudan: Turkey

South Sudan–Turkey relations are the foreign relations between South Sudan and Turkey. Turkey has an embassy in Juba, while South Sudan has an embassy in Ankara.

== History ==
Turkey was one of the first countries to recognize the independence of South Sudan from Sudan in 2011. Soon after that, the Turkish consulate general in Juba was upgraded to embassy status.

In 2020, the Turkish news agency Anadolu Agency stated that the Turkish Cooperation and Coordination Agency (TIKA) had donated donates equipment, materials for vocational training program for inmates. The donated equipment included 100 welding rods, 240 grinding discs, 280 cutting discs, welding goggles, hammers and sheet metal. The same year, TIKA donated about 250 fishing kits to over 150 fishermen in Juba.

== Economic relations ==
- Trade volume between the two countries was US$2.7 million in 2018. The trade volume grew to US$3.2 million in 2019.

== See also ==
- Foreign relations of South Sudan
- Foreign relations of Turkey
