= Guinea–Turkey relations =

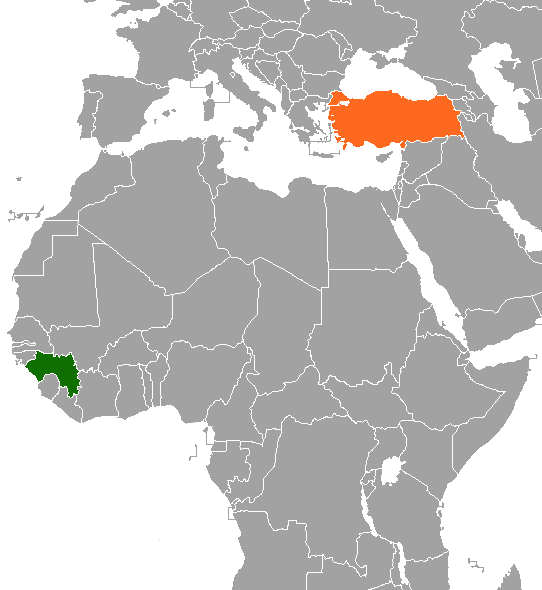
- Guinea: Turkey

Guinea–Turkey relations are the foreign relations between Guinea and Turkey. Guinea opened its embassy in Ankara and Turkey opened its embassy in Conakry in 2013.

== Diplomatic relations ==
In 1958, Guinea became the only French sub-Saharan African colony to vote for independence. Guinea’s last colonial prime minister Touré became the first President of Guinea after campaigning for a vote for independence. 95% of the population voted for independence, which earned Touré the enmity of the French president de Gaulle. The French withdrew immediately, taking with them everything they could and destroying what they could not, including lightbulbs, plans for sewage pipelines in Conakry. The French even burned medicines rather than leaving them for Guineans, leaving Guinea as one of the world's poorest, least developed, and most isolated countries.

France even forcefully threatened NATO partners Turkey and United States — that if Turkey or the United States were to provide any assistance to Guinea or establish any trade relations, de Gaulle was prepared to leave NATO. Following this ultimate, President Eisenhower refused to even acknowledge Guinea's requests for foreign aid. Turkey denounced de Gaulle's as extreme but refrained from providing assistance to Guinea.

After being snubbed by NATO countries for financial aid, Touré predictably turned to the Soviet Union for economic assistance. Until the end of the Cold War, Turkey had limited diplomatic relations with Guinea.

== Economic relations ==
- Trade volume between the two countries was US$136.7 million in 2019.
- There are direct flights from Istanbul to Conakry since January 30, 2017.

== Educational relations ==
- Turkish Maarif Foundation is currently running 5 schools in Guinea.
- Turkey has been granting scholarships to Guinean students since 1992.

== See also ==
- Foreign relations of Guinea
- Foreign relations of Turkey
