= Cameroon–Turkey relations =

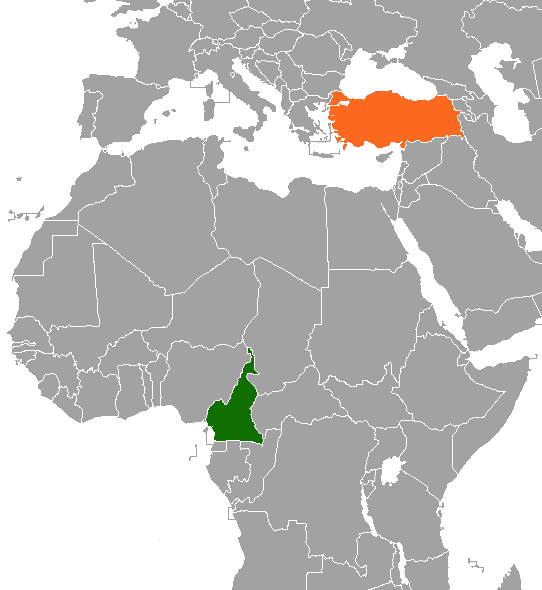
- Cameroon: Turkey

Cameroon–Turkey relations are the foreign relations between Cameroon and Turkey.

== Diplomatic relations ==
Relations were initially tense between Turkey and Cameroon under President Ahidjo, who used the police and security apparatus to eliminate people who were perceived to be his enemies. Relations with Turkey improved considerably with Cameroon under Biya, who attempted to develop a freer and more democratic Cameroon with more freedom of speech and press. During this time, Turkey assisted Cameroon in building schools, which contributed to the fact that relative to many African countries, Cameroon has a much higher proportion of children in school. However, relations worsened after the crackdown on dissent following the 1984 coup attempt.

Following the decline in prices and demand in petroleum, Cameroon's economy which is highly dependent on export of petroleum, deteriorated rapidly. By 1987, Cameroon became a Heavily indebted poor countries, which allowed access to additional funds. Turkey joined the IMF, the World Bank, and other aid-giving countries in providing economic assistance to Cameroon.

== Economic relations ==
- Trade volume between the two countries was 205 million USD in 2018 (Turkish exports/imports: 151/54 million USD).
- There are direct flights daily from Istanbul to Douala and Yaoundé.

== Educational relations ==
- Turkish Maarif Foundation runs schools in Cameroon.

== See also ==
- Foreign relations of Cameroon
- Foreign relations of Turkey
