= Myanmar–Turkey relations =

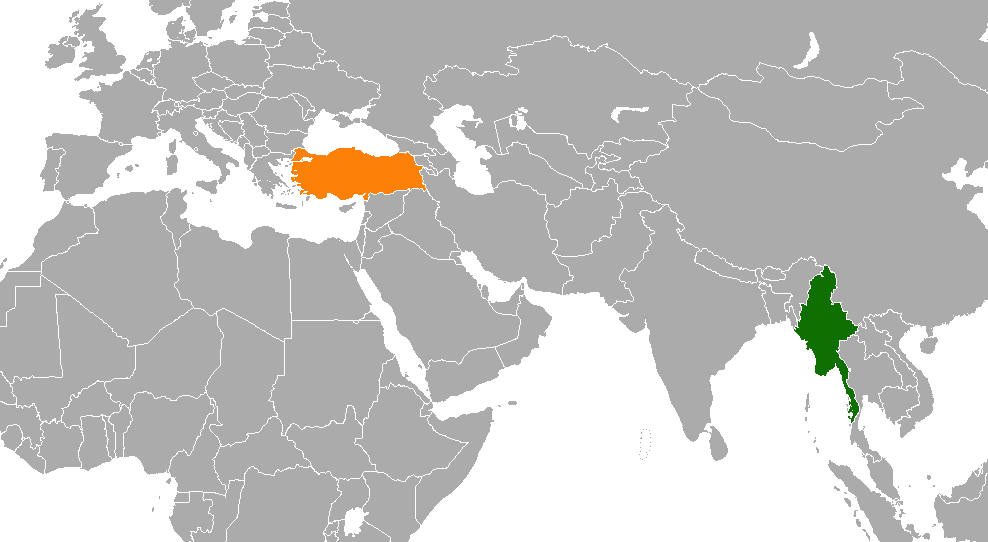
- Myanmar: Turkey

Myanmar–Turkey relations are the foreign relations between Myanmar and Turkey. Turkey has an embassy in Naypyidaw and Myanmar's ambassador in Cairo, Egypt is also accredited to Turkey.

== Diplomatic relations ==
Relations were tense between Myanmar and Turkey because of Turkey's support for the Kuomintang in Taiwan. Burma had hostile relations with Taiwan and intercepted a cargo plane from Taiwan bringing Turkish and American supplies to the Kuomintang. This caused a new diplomatic crisis between Turkey and Burma. Relations improved afterward and were amicable.

Relations became very tense in 1988 after Tatmadaw’s very violent crackdown on peaceful civilian demonstrators. Aung San Suu Kyi gained admiration and sympathy in Turkey as a result of Tatmadaw’s actions. Turkey subsequently suspended its aid programs except for humanitarian aid. Turkey was very critical of Aung San Suu Kyi's house arrest and collaborated with United States Secretary of State Madeleine Albright, who took a personal interest in her wellbeing.

== Economic relations ==
- Trade volume between the two countries was 38.7 million USD in 2018 (Turkish exports/imports: 30.7/8 million USD).

== See also ==
- Foreign relations of Myanmar
- Foreign relations of Turkey
