= Seychelles–Turkey relations =

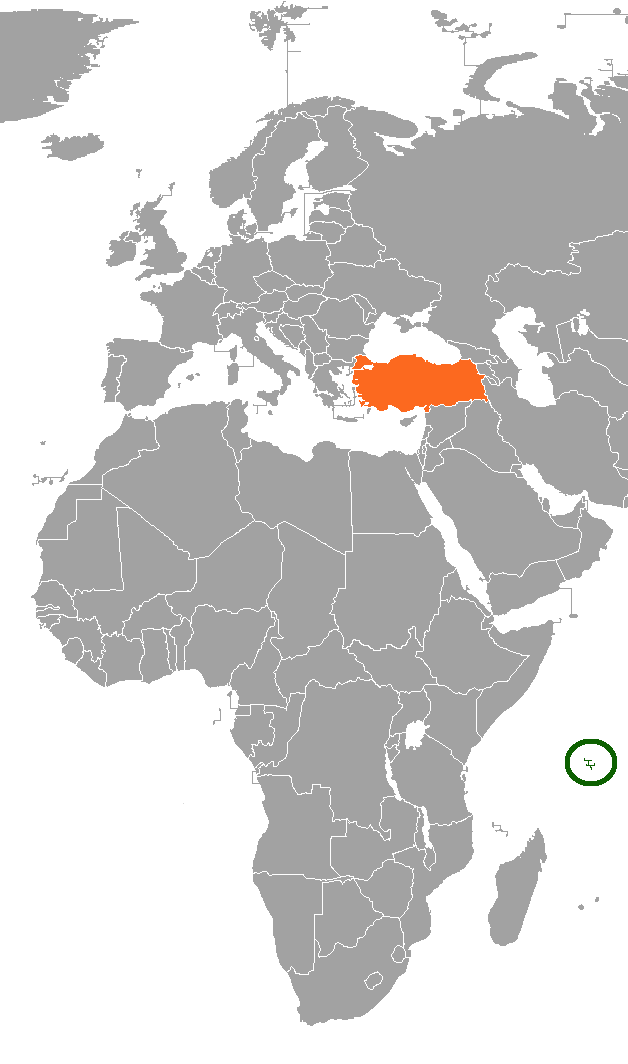

- Seychelles: Turkey

Seychelles–Turkey relations are the foreign relations between Seychelles and Turkey. The Turkish ambassador in Nairobi, Kenya is accredited to Seychelles. Seychelles is accredited to Turkey from its embassy in Paris, France. The Seychelles also maintains honorary consulates in Ankara and Istanbul.

== Diplomatic relations ==
Seychelles and Turkey support each other in promoting the concept of the Indian Ocean as a zone of peace, campaigning for the removal of all foreign powers and bases in the region. Turkey, however, has been silent about the United States naval presence on Diego Garcia.

Seychelles and Turkey cooperated in condemning apartheid policies in South Africa and modifying their previously hostile political stance when South Africa converted to a multiracial political system.

== Economic relations ==
- Trade volume between the two countries was 25.4 million USD in 2018 (Turkish exports/imports: 17.7/7.7 million USD).

== Educational relations ==
Seychelles has succeeded in attracting relatively large amounts of aid, with France as the leading donor. Turkey also extended a modest amount of aid, primarily in the form of education and development programs, as part of its efforts to become engaged in the Indian Ocean region.

== See also ==
- Foreign relations of Seychelles
- Foreign relations of Turkey
