= Grand Free Trade Area =

The Grand Free Trade Area (GFTA) is a project envisaged by several regional blocs in Africa (Southern African Development Community, East African Community and the Common Market for East and Southern Africa) in order to bring about increased intra-African trade.

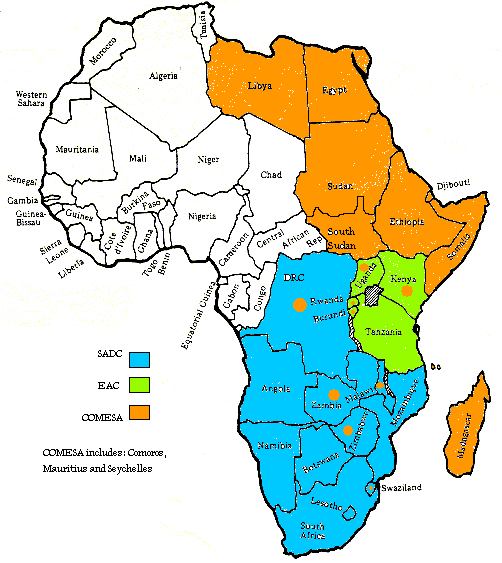
Africa with 3 regional blocs included in the GFTA

The idea behind joining these economies is to enable Africa to become far more self-reliant. It will also allow small economies to have access to larger regional markets, bringing about diversity, GDP growth, and increased employment.

The initial stages would be to increase road, rail and communications infrastructure in order to facilitate intra-continental trade and allow for an increased sharing of ideas and skills.

== Projects ==
Various road, bridges and border post projects were in progress as of 2012. The Kenya-Tanzania highway project (dual lane) was to start in mid-2013, with the funding of the African Development Bank completed by the end of 2016. The Entebbe-Kampala highway was also to be completed by the end of 2016, increasing the transport network in Uganda. The Kenyan port of Mombasa was undergoing a revamp with a new container terminal and new road and rail links to serve its increasing load.

The North-South Corridor is a project within the GFTA, planning to link Cape Town and Cairo with tarred roads and increased infrastructure. Road projects between Dar es Salaam and Cairo were underway, with the section to be fully tarred by 2015. Single stop border posts were also being planned for most border posts along the route.
