= Turkish Maarif Foundation =

Turkish education foundation

- Abbreviation: TMV
- Founded: June 17, 2016; 10 years ago Istanbul, Republic of Turkey
- Founder: Prof. Birol Akgun
- Purpose: Free Education All Around the World, Turkish Educational System, Science and Education projects
- Location: Ord. Prof. Dr. Fahrettin Kerim Gokay Caddesi Erdem Sokak No:5 Altunizade Uskudar / Istanbul / Turkey
- Region served: Worldwide
- Key people: Mahmut M. ÖZDİL / Chairman
- Employees: ~7,327 staff/contractors
- Website: turkiyemaarif.org

The Turkish Maarif Foundation (TMF; Türkiye Maarif Vakfı) was established under Law No. 6721 to provide formal and non-formal education and to award scholarships in all educational processes from preschool to university education, to open facilities such as educational organizations and dormitories, to train educators to be assigned to these organizations including domestic organizations, to conduct scientific research, and to carry out research and development studies, publish academic works and develop methods and conduct other educational activities which are in accordance with the laws and regulations of that country which these are operated.

== About ==
As a result of the official contacts established with 104 countries worldwide, representative offices have been opened in 52 countries and activities are carried out in 67 countries. The Turkey Maarif Foundation possesses nine training centers in Afghanistan, Germany, Austria, France, Kosovo, Belarus and Belgium; one university in Albania; and 42 dormitories across the globe. Its activities continue in 332 schools, universities and education centers within 43 countries with a total of approximately 40 thousand students. The foundation employs in total 7,327 staff members abroad, including 405 Turkish citizens. Apart from the current educational activities, 65 different protocols have been signed to open new schools. The Turkish Maarif Foundation serves as a gateway to international educational arena of Turkey that will contribute to enhancing cultural and civilizational interaction and paving the way for achieving the common wellbeing. Together with the Ministry of National Education, TMF which was established by the enacted law on June 17, 2016, by the Turkish parliament is the sole entity authorized to provide educational services abroad. As a non-profit public educational foundation, TMF is entitled to run institutions from pre-school to higher education.

The foundation has been described as ideologically Islamist.
