= List of ambassadors of Turkey to Afghanistan =

The list of ambassadors of Turkey to Afghanistan provides a chronological record of individuals who have served as the diplomatic representatives of the Republic of Turkey to the many countries that existed in what is today known as the Islamic Emirate of Afghanistan.

== Suicide attack on ambassador ==
On 26 February 2015, a suicide bomber targeted İsmail Aramaz by ramming a Toyota sedan filled with explosives to a diplomatic Mercedes-Benz SUV used by the Embassy of Turkey outside their compound. Witnesses say the diplomatic SUV was waiting to pick up İsmail Aramaz, a Turkish national, who was just appointed as the representative of NATO to Afghanistan. He was not in the car and survived. The attack killed one Turkish soldier and wounded another.

Importantly, İsmail Aramaz also served as the ambassador of Turkey to Afghanistan, and his term had ended a month prior to the attack, as he was now the representative of NATO to Afghanistan.

Turkish soldiers stationed at the embassy responded to the scene.

Taliban claimed responsibility for the attack, stating that they did not intend to harm any diplomatic mission, and that they targeted a US convoy.

Turkish Armed Forces said in a brief statement that the attack targeted the team tasked with protecting İsmail Aramaz.

== List of ambassadors ==
| Ambassador | Term start | Term end | Ref. |
|---|---|---|---|
| Abdur Rahman Peshawari | 1 August 1920 | 25 June 1922 | |
| Fahrettin Türkkan | 26 June 1922 | 12 May 1926 | |
| Yusuf Hikmet Bayur | 30 June 1928 | 1 August 1931 | |
| Memduh Şevket Esendal | 19 November 1933 | 31 October 1941 | |
| Kemal Köprülü | 21 May 1942 | 15 May 1945 | |
| Ahmet Cavad Üstün | 30 May 1945 | 14 December 1949 | |
| Cemal Yeşil | 28 March 1951 | 26 January 1956 | |
| Zekai Okan | 27 February 1956 | 19 February 1959 | |
| Talat Benler | 31 March 1960 | 4 August 1964 | |
| Cemil Vafi | 7 November 1964 | 19 December 1966 | |
| Hamit Batu | 29 December 1966 | 18 January 1971 | |
| Ömer Faruk Şahinbaş | 28 November 1971 | 2 April 1976 | |
| İlhan Bakay | 31 July 1978 | 29 July 1981 | |
| Altan Güven | 1 December 1981 | 16 August 1985 | |
| Salih Zeki Karaca | 1 January 1985 | 1 January 1990 | |
| Aykut Çetirge | 30 October 1993 | 1 May 1995 | |
| Bilge Cankorel | 7 December 1995 | 27 November 1997 | |
| Ahmet Müfit Özdeş | 12 March 2002 | 28 January 2004 | |
| Bülent Tulun | 28 January 2004 | 17 December 2005 | |
| İsmail Ethem Tokdemir | 25 December 2005 | 19 September 2009 | |
| Basat Öztürk | 18 May 2011 | 1 December 2013 | |
| İsmail Aramaz | 25 December 2013 | 1 January 2015 | |
| Ali Sait Akın | 21 July 2015 | 16 November 2017 | |
| Oğuzhan Ertuğrul | 30 November 2017 | 14 May 2021 | |
| Cihad Erginay | 22 May 2021 | Present | |
