= Pakistan–Turkey relations =

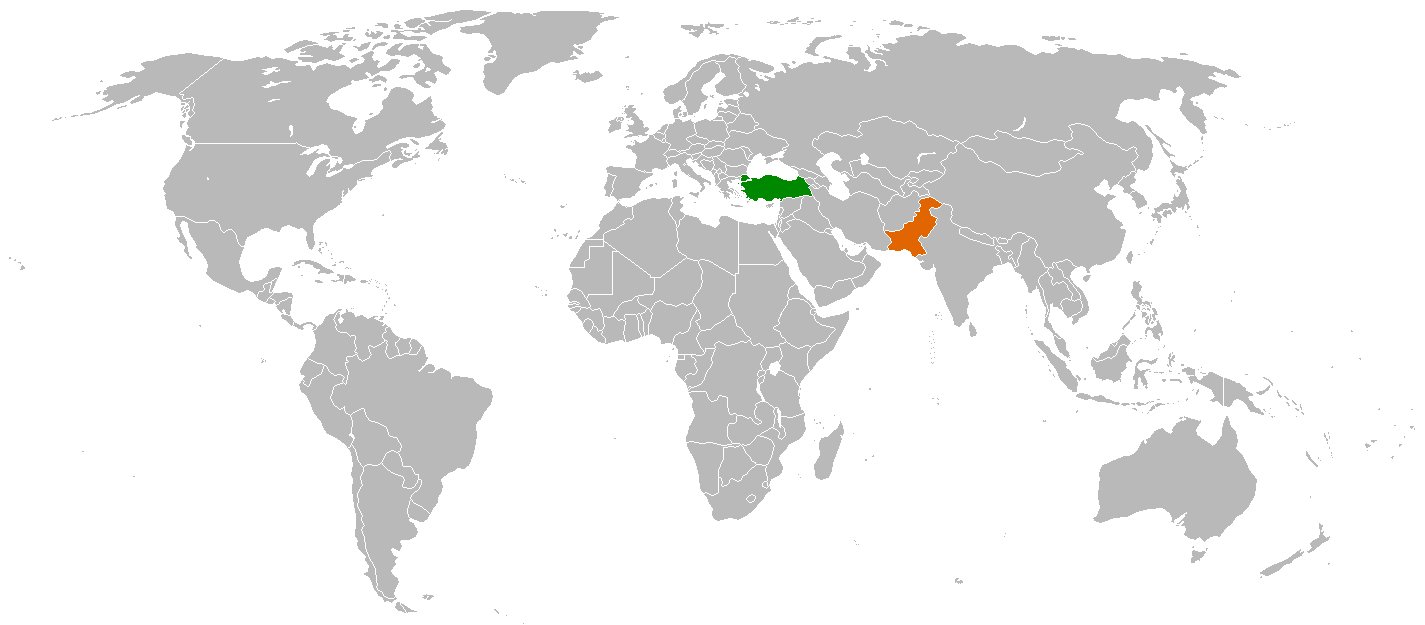
- Turkey: Pakistan

Diplomatic mission
- Embassy of Turkey, Islamabad: Embassy of Pakistan, Ankara

Pakistan–Turkey relations are the bilateral relations between Pakistan and Turkey. Pakistan has an embassy in Ankara, a Consulate-General in Istanbul and an honorary consulate in İzmir whereas, Turkey has an embassy in Islamabad, a Consulate-General in Karachi and Lahore and honorary consulates in Peshawar, Sialkot and Faisalabad. As of 2016, in a joint communique, Pakistan and Turkey plan to strengthen their close ties into a strategic partnership.

Relations date back generations before the establishment of the two states, more precisely during the Turkish War of Independence when the Muslims of the northwestern British Raj or pre-independent Pakistan sent financial aid to the declining Ottoman Empire, which was followed by the formation of the Turkish Republic and the Independence of Pakistan. Additionally, the countries share historical Islamic ties, as the Muslims living under the British Raj deemed the Ottoman Sultan as their Caliph, and the Caliph of Islam and all Muslims. As a result, Pakistan and Pakistanis had enjoyed a positive perception in Turkey and amongst Turks for many decades. Pakistan and Turkey enjoy close cultural, historical and military relations which are now expanding into deepening economic relations as both countries seek to develop their economies. Turkey supports Pakistan's position of holding a plebiscite under the UN to decide if Kashmir wants to join Pakistan, a position which Turkish President Erdogan reaffirmed in a joint address to the Pakistani parliament and which was attended by Pakistan's military high command. Turkey supports Pakistan's membership of the Nuclear Suppliers Group. Talat Masood said that Turkey and Pakistan enjoy close relations during both democratic and military regimes, reflecting the depth of the relations between the two nations.

Pakistan's close and historical ties to Ankara have made it reluctant and resistant to recognizing the controversial Armenian genocide.

== Diplomatic relations ==
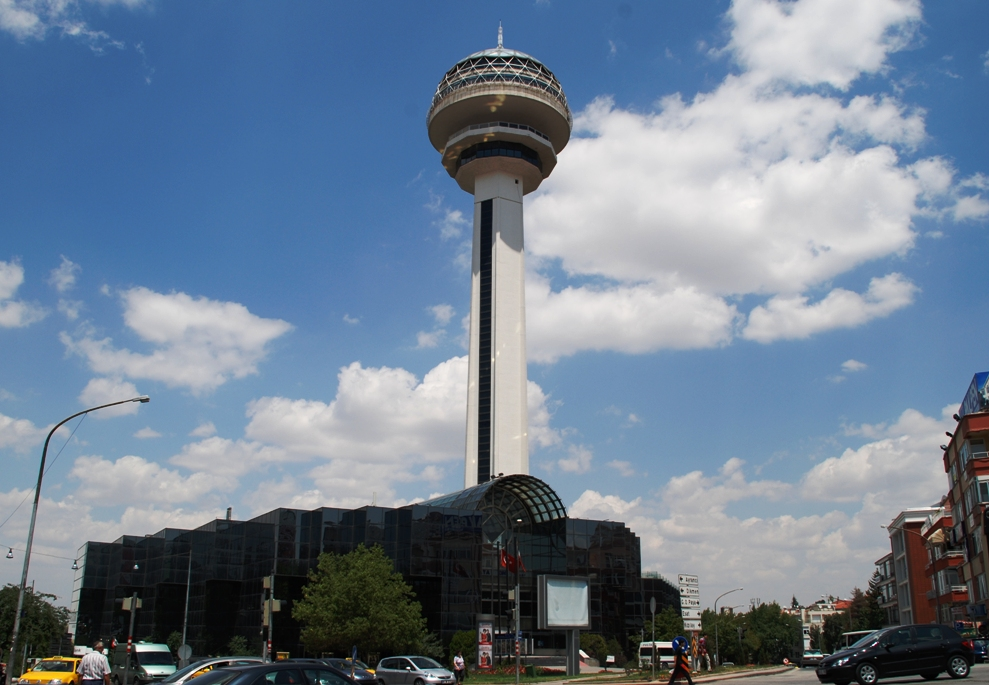
Cinnah Caddesi, the major road in the Turkish capital, Ankara, which is named after Muhammad Ali Jinnah, the founder of Pakistan.

Diplomatic relations between Turkey and Pakistan were established in 1947, soon after Pakistan gained independence as the then largest Muslim country on world map.

Turkey established diplomatic relations soon after the independence of Pakistan in 1947 and bilateral relations became increasingly close owing to cultural, religious and geopolitical links between the two countries. Turkey was among a few countries that quickly recognized Pakistan after its creation and supported its successful bid to become a member of the United Nations. In February 1954, Pakistan and Turkey signed the Pact of Mutual Cooperation, a precursor to the Baghdad Pact. To reassure its Balkan Pact ally SFR Yugoslavia, which maintained close ties with India, Ankara emphasized that the agreement was not directed against New Delhi.

Pakistan's founder Muhammad Ali Jinnah expressed admiration for Turkey's founding leader Mustafa Kemal Atatürk and also a desire to develop Pakistan on the Turkish model of modernism. Similar ideas were expressed by the former President of Pakistan Pervez Musharraf, who grew up in Turkey and had received extensive military training there. Jinnah is honoured as a great leader in Turkey, and a major road of the Turkish capital Ankara, the Cinnah Caddesi is named after him, while roads in Islamabad, Karachi, Lahore, Peshawar, and Larkana are named after Atatürk. On 26 October 2009, Recep Tayyip Erdoğan was awarded the Nishan-e-Pakistan and was the fourth world leader who spoke to the Pakistani parliament.

=== 75th anniversary of diplomatic relations (2022) ===
On Nov 16, 2022, Pakistan International Airlines commenced flight to Istanbul on the 75th anniversary of diplomatic relations between Pakistan and Turkey.

== Cultural relations ==
=== Turkish language education in Pakistan ===
Turkish language education in Pakistan has expanded in recent years through the involvement of Turkish cultural and educational institutions and partnerships with Pakistani universities. The Yunus Emre Institute, Turkey's official cultural and language organization, has supported Turkish language courses and cultural programs in Pakistan, with reports indicating that Turkish language courses have attracted hundreds of Pakistani students in structured programs, with 400 students commencing Turkish language in 2023 alone. In addition, cooperation agreements have been signed to introduce and expand Turkish language instruction in Pakistani educational institutions, including a memorandum of understanding between Allama Iqbal Open University and the Yunus Emre Institute to promote Turkish language education in Pakistan. At the tertiary level, Turkish is offered as a subject at several universities, including the National University of Modern Languages (NUML) in Islamabad, which provides certificate, diploma, and degree programs in Turkish language and culture. The growth of Turkish language learning in Pakistan has been linked to expanding educational exchange programs, scholarship opportunities in Turkish universities, and broader cultural ties between Pakistan and Turkey.

The Pak-Turk Maarif International Schools & Colleges system educates over 13,000 students across multiple cities and teaches Turkish language and culture alongside its regular curriculum, a significant indicator that thousands of Pakistani students encounter Turkish language.

=== Pakistani students in Turkey ===
In 2025, a record number of Pakistani students were selected for Türkiye Scholarships, with 166 students scheduled to begin studies in Turkey under the programme following an orientation event at the Turkish Embassy in Islamabad. The Turkish Ambassador highlighted strong educational cooperation between Pakistan and Turkey, noting that around 30,000 students apply annually and that increasing numbers of Pakistani students are pursuing fully funded undergraduate, master's, and PhD degrees through the scholarships. In addition to the Türkiye Scholarships managed by the Presidency for Turks Abroad and Related Communities (YTB), students also benefit from other Turkish institutional programmes such as those offered by TÜBİTAK, Diyanet, and IHH. At the time of the announcement, approximately 5,000 Pakistani students were already studying in Turkey.

== Economic relations ==
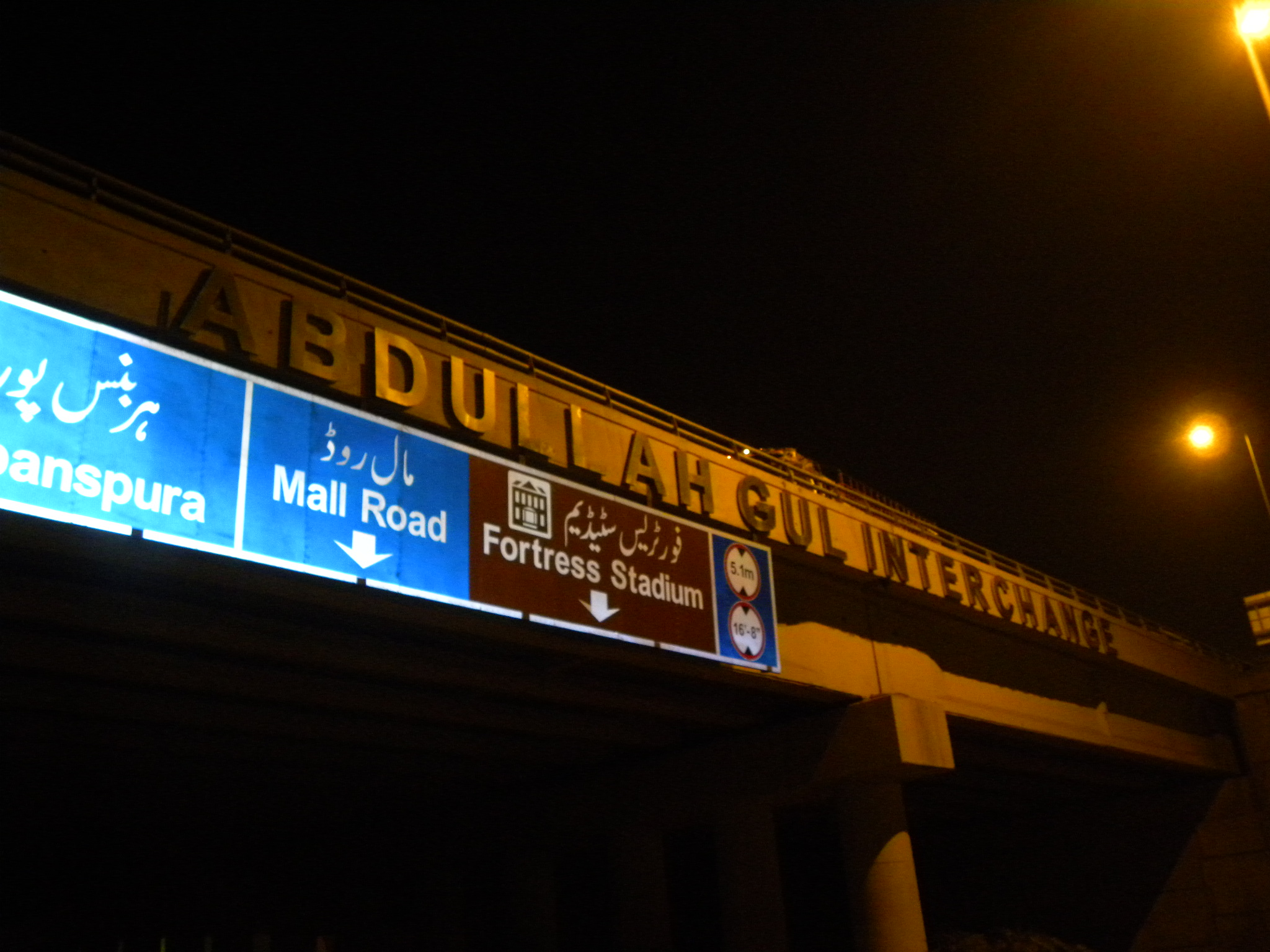
The Abdullah Gul Interchange near Allama Iqbal International Airport in Lahore, this interchange was inaugurated by the Turkish President Abdullah Gul during his visit to Lahore in 2010.

=== Pak-Turkey Strategic Economic Framework ===
The framework aims to enhance bilateral economic cooperation with particular focus on trade and investment. Turkey and Pakistan agreed on a strategic economic framework and an action plan, Turkish Trade Minister Ruhsar Pekcan said Friday. Speaking at Turkey-Pakistan Business Forum held in the Pakistani capital Islamabad, Pekcan said high level council with the attendance of two countries' leaders addressed trade and economic cooperation. Bilateral trade volume is aimed to exceed $1 billion in short-term, up from its current level of $850 million, she added. "I believe that bilateral investments will continue accelerating, thanks to the Turkish president's visit to Pakistan," Pekcan noted. She stressed the importance of Turkish contractors to participate in Pakistan's infrastructure and superstructure investments. "We will utilize the sources of Turk Eximbank and the Asian Infrastructure Investment Bank to finance those projects," Pekcan highlighted. The forum was organized by Turkey's Foreign Economic Relations Board and the Federation of Pakistan Chambers of Commerce and Industry.

=== Investment and trade ===
Turkey and Pakistan are founding members of the Economic Cooperation Organization and part of the Developing 8 Countries (D-8) organization. Both nations have worked to negotiate a preferential trading agreement, aiming to considerably increase trade and investments, especially in transport, telecommunications, manufacturing, tourism and other industries. Both governments have sought to increase the volume of bilateral trade from $690 million to more than $1 billion by 2010. Pakistani exports include rice, sesame seeds, leather, textiles, fabrics, sports goods, and medical equipment. Turkey exports to Pakistan include wheat, chickpeas, lentils, diesel, chemicals, transport vehicles, machinery and energy products. Turkish private corporations have also invested significantly in industrial and construction projects developing highways, pipelines and canals. The two countries are negotiating the Turkey-Pakistan Free Trade Agreement.

In August 2022, Pakistan and Turkey signed a Preferential Trade Agreement. Under the agreement, Turkey offered concessions to Pakistan on 261 tariff lines, which include both the agriculture and industrial sectors. On the other hand, Pakistan offered concessions to Turkey on 130 tariff lines.

Turkey has seen an increase of Pakistani tourists over the years who contribute to Turkey's tourism industry which makes a fraction of the country's economy. In 2024, up to 135,000 Pakistani tourists were reported to have visited Turkey.

Additionally, Pakistanis reside in Turkey as investors, which is another fraction of Turkey's economy. This also includes property investment by Pakistanis.

Pakistani passengers also commonly fly on Turkish Airlines both to visit Turkey and/or to transit through there when traveling abroad, thereby contributing to Turkey's transportation industry, another fraction of the Turkish economy.

== Historical and cultural relations ==
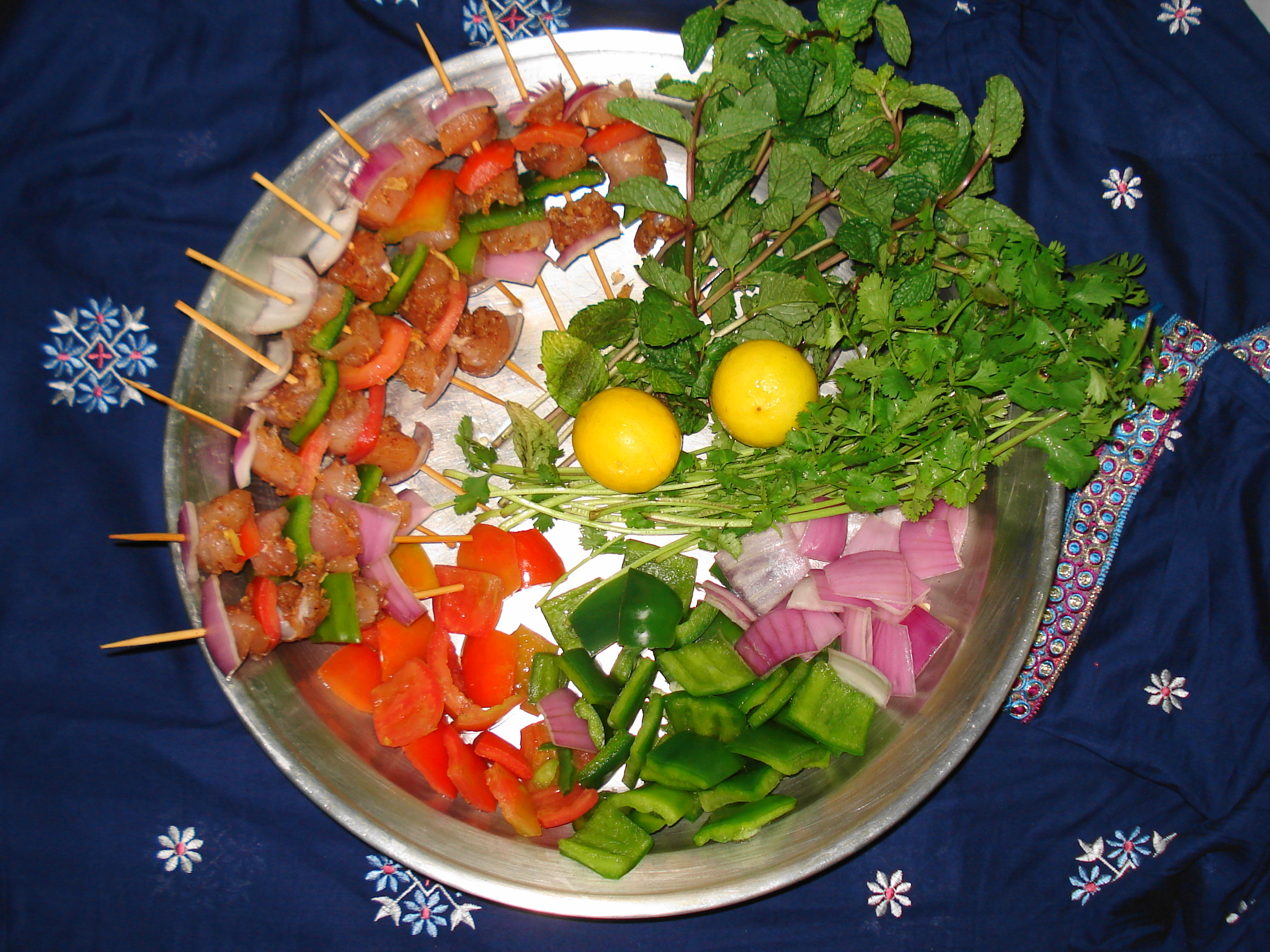
Shashlik, a common Eurasian dish.

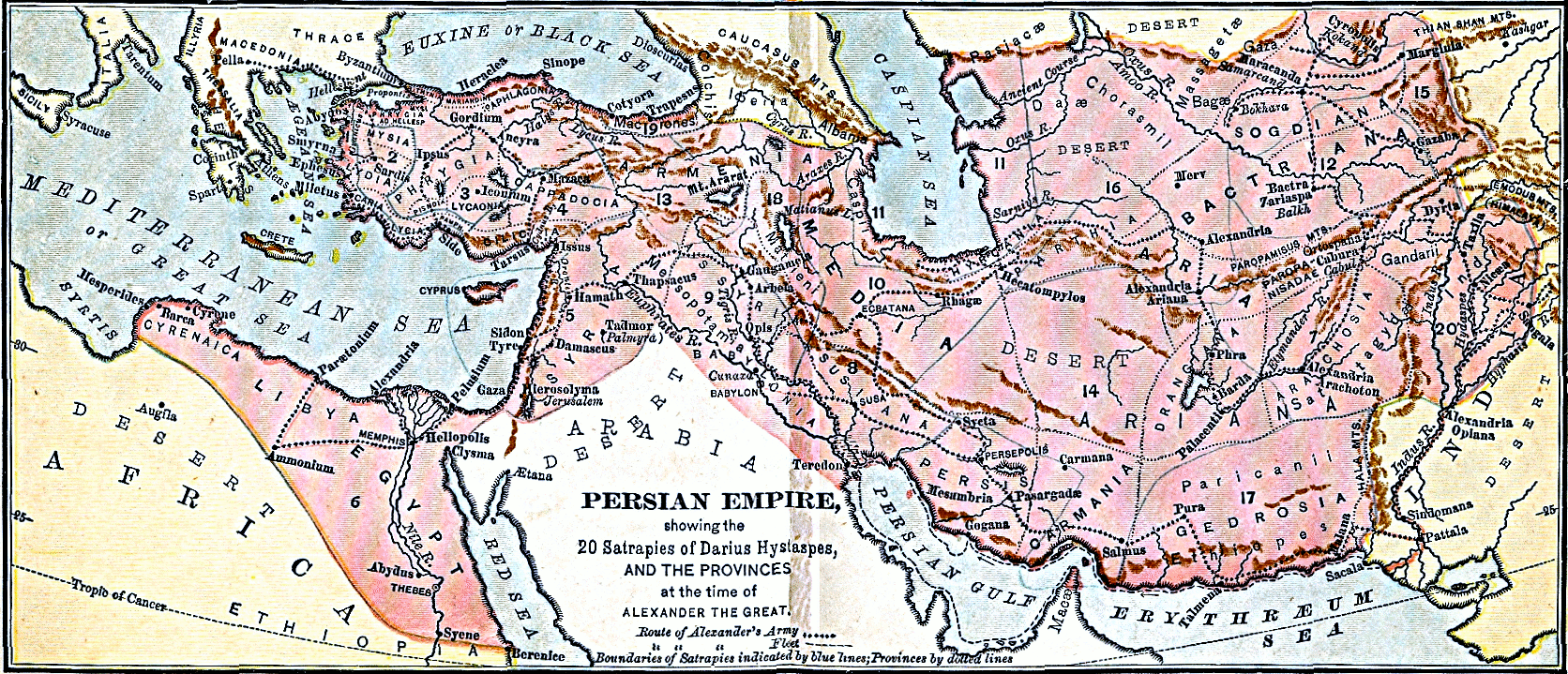
Regions of both modern-day Turkey and Pakistan in the domain of the Persian Empire.

The regions comprising both Pakistan and Turkey have been mutually influenced by contiguous Iranic, Hellenistic, Arab and Turco-Mongol cultures at various points in history. By the fifth century BCE, Persian Empires spread from Anatolia to the Indus River, introducing Persianate cultural and political traditions to these regions.

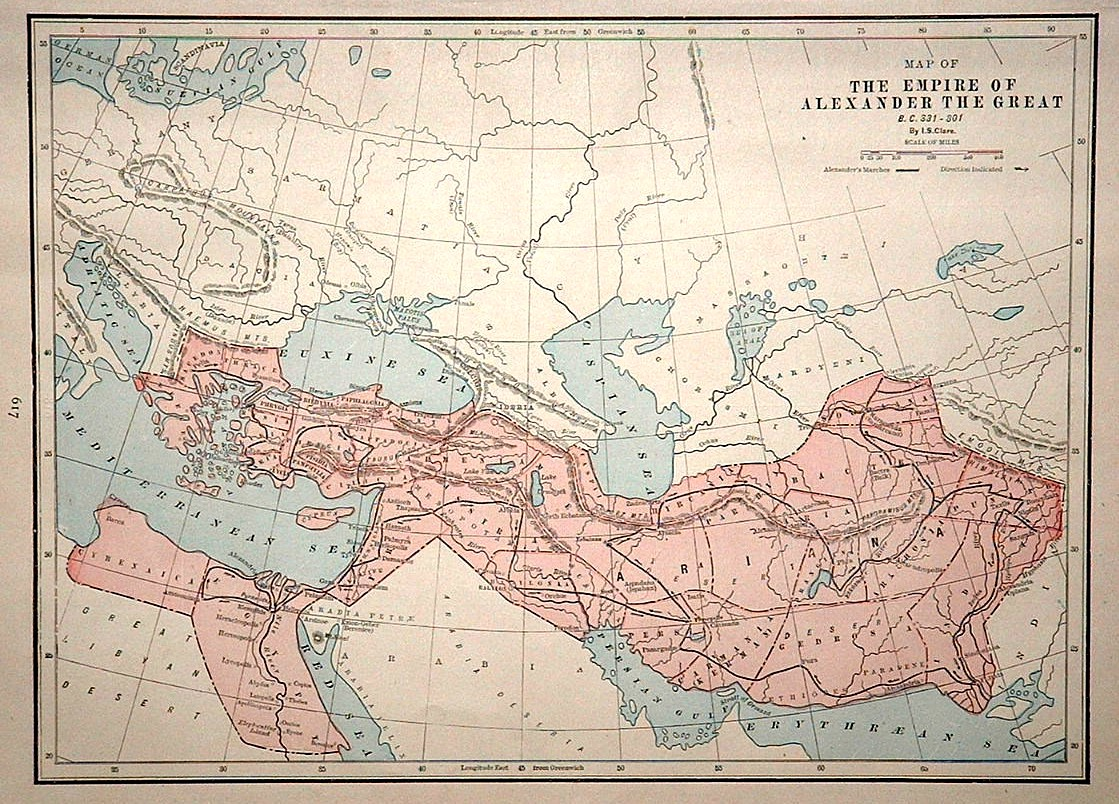
Common Hellenistic influence following the conquests of Alexander the Great.

Modern-day Turkey was home to many ancient European civilizations, including that of the Ionian Greeks. The country has many traces of cultural and historical influences from the ancient Greeks, including many Greek and Hellenistic archeological sites found in the region. Pakistan was also influenced by Greek culture and civilization in the aftermath of Alexander the Great's conquest of the Indus Valley, which later led to the development of the Indo-Greek Kingdoms and Greco-Buddhism. Gandhara, a region in western Pakistan, was a major thoroughfare of Hellenistic, Iranic and Indo-Aryan contact.

Turkey became a Turkic-speaking country as a result of Seljuq conquest and Turkification of the region. Though Pakistan is not a Turkic-speaking country, its major languages, particularly Urdu, also known as Lashkari, are strongly influenced by the Turkic language of the Mughals before it became the empire's official language. As a result, it has borrowed many loanwords from Chagatai. The etymology of the word "Urdu" traces itself back to Mughal rule, believed to be coined by the poet Mashafi.

Moreover, the common cultural influences on Pakistan and Turkey span several centuries, as many Turkic and Iranic peoples ruled vast areas of Central Asia, South Asia and the Middle East.

The designs of clothing of the two countries also have common origins in Central Asia. Food is also similar to some extent such as Kebab, Pilaf and Halva although the spice content in Pakistan is different due to South Asian influence.

Both the majority of Turkey's and Pakistan's population practice the Hanafi school of Sunni Islam, although Pakistani historian Umair Khan argues that Hannafi Islam was official government policy in Kemal Pasha's nation building process, as opposed to Jinnah's nation building policies where he wanted to minimize the role of religion in Pakistani state politics. which was the interpretation of Islam implemented by the Ottoman Empire and Mughal Empire respectively. Robust traditions of moderate Sufism exist and the religious ministers of both nations frequently contact each other.

Ottoman military expeditions to Aceh and Brunei during the 1500s often involved Sindhi forces.

== Pakistan and Turkey relations in present times ==
Relations of the two countries have been strong with Prime Minister Imran Khan visiting Turkey followed by a visit of Pakistan by President Recep Tayyip Erdogan in February 2020. Pakistanis enjoy the gracious attitude of ordinary Turks towards Pakistanis and are often termed as Kardeş (brother). Turkish television shows have huge popularity in Pakistan with recently the Turkish show Ertugrul Ghazi, Payitaht Abdülhamid being dubbed by Pakistan Television Corporation in the Urdu language, and has taken the country by storm. Erdoğan became one of the few world leaders to be given an opportunity to make give a speech in the Pakistani parliament and he is quoted saying "I pray that Allah (God) makes the solidarity between us strong and permanent" and "As in the past, we will continue to stand by Pakistan in the future". Both the countries announced dual citizenship under the citizenship initiative, in which the citizens of Pakistan and Turkey would be able to attain joint citizenship and dual passports. Pakistani and Turkish Armed Forces also hold many joint training sessions and Turkey imports arms from Pakistan.

On July 27, 2021, the first trilateral meeting of the Chairman of the National Assembly (Milli Majlis) of Azerbaijan, Sahiba Gafarova, the Chairman of the Grand National Assembly of Turkey, Mustafa Shentop, and the Chairman of the National Assembly of Pakistan (Majlis e Shura e Pakistan), Asad Qaiser, took place.

During the meeting, the text of Baku Declaration was discussed and approved. The Declaration emphasizes the importance of historical and cultural ties, strengthening parliamentary dialogue and cooperation, establishment of peace, stability and development in these regions and et cetera.

It was also decided to hold the second trilateral meeting of the chairmen in Islamabad, Pakistan in 2022.

=== Kashmir conflict ===
The Turkish ambassador spent a week in Pakistan administered Kashmir's capital city of Muzaffarabad to express solidarity with the Kashmir cause. President Recep Tayyip Erdoğan recently expressed that Turkey stands with Pakistan on Kashmir issue, bringing opposition from India.

== Trilateral Ankara cooperation process ==
Turkey launched a trilateral summit process between the two states and Afghanistan in February 2007, following a visit by then Turkish Foreign Minister Abdullah Gül to Islamabad, as the backbone of its diversified foreign policy in Southeast Asia and Pakistani deputy Humair Hayat Khan Rokhri confirmed that according to Gül "we are all brothers who need to support each other", in order to, "bring security and stability to the region".

A 1 April 2009, meeting between Pakistani and Afghan leaders, conducted as part of the trilateral Ankara cooperation process, saw the three countries pledged to increase coordination between their political, military and intelligence ties in the fight against militancy and terrorism. Chairman of the Turkish–Pakistani Friendship Association Burhan Kayatürk has stated that "It is the first time that the military and intelligence chiefs of Afghanistan and Pakistan have attended the trilateral summit, which is a reflection of the deeper commitment to work together".

At 17 April 2009, Friends of Pakistan Tokyo Donors Conference, Turkish State Minister Mehmet Aydın pledged $100 million to Pakistan for infrastructure, health and education projects. Turkish Parliamentary Deputy Kayatürk has called on neighboring countries, including India, to make similar commitments as "It is in their interests to see a stable Pakistan; otherwise violence will spill over into their territory".

Pakistani and Afghan parliamentary deputies came together in Ankara on 5 May 2009, as part of the trilateral Ankara cooperation process, where they met with the now Turkish President Gül and new Foreign Minister Ahmet Davutoğlu to discuss a variety of issues. Head of the Turkish Parliament's Foreign Relations Commission Murat Mercan stated;

"Today we need cooperation between our countries more than ever. I believe Turkey, having historical brotherhood relations with both, is in a special position to improve and deepen this cooperation. Turkey is confident that the cooperation to be established between Afghanistan and Pakistan will help a lot to solve the problems".

Chairman of the Pakistani Parliament's Foreign Relations Commission Asfandyar Wali Khan conveyed his thanks and stated,

"We need Turkey's support to build stability in the region".

Mercan concluded,

"We are finally on the verge of institutionalizing the trilateral Ankara cooperation process within the framework of parliamentary joint initiatives", with follow-up meetings due to be held in Islamabad and Kabul at four-month intervals".

== Military relations ==
=== Air force ===
Pakistan and Turkey have maintained long-standing military ties with Turkey also providing training to Pakistani air force officers in upgrading its F-16 fleet. On 2 April 1954, Pakistan and Turkey signed a treaty of friendship and cooperation. Both countries, valued as important states in their regions, joined the Central Treaty Organization (CENTO) aimed to bolster military and strategic cooperation and counter the spread of communism and Soviet influence in the region. During 1970s, Turkey had openly supported Pakistan's stance on the Kashmir conflict and recognized Jammu and Kashmir, as part of Pakistan, with which it endeavours to 'spice up' bilateral relations, and the Turkish ambassador to Pakistan spent nearly a week in Muzaffarabad, the capital of Pakistan administered kashmir, in order to show Turkish solidarity with the Pakistanis in regards to Kashmir and maintained political and military support during its wars with India. Pakistan has reciprocated by expressing support for Turkey's policy on Northern Cyprus. Both nations have sought to expand cooperation to fight terrorism. Both countries are also members of the Organisation of Islamic Cooperation.

Turkey is also currently a major arms seller to Pakistan. Turkey previously purchased arms from Pakistan and continuous to purchase minor aerial weapons and components from Pakistan. The Pakistan and Turkish Air Force signed a deal to purchase 52 Super Mushak trainer turbo-props from Pakistan for Turkey to help train new pilots and support recovery of the Turkish Armed Forces in the aftermath of pilot shortages after the attempted coup.

Turkey's new generation TAI TF Kaan fighter jet also reportedly has Pakistani involvement in the development project.

=== Navy ===
In July 2018, Pakistan's navy signed a contract for the acquisition of four MILGEM-class (MILGEM project) ships from Turkey which is the largest single military export deal of Turkey worth $1.5 billion. Pakistan Navy Commander Admiral Zafar Mahmood Abbasi and Erdogan cut the first metal plate of the first of the four MILGEM Ada class corvette during a ceremony held on 29 September 2019. Over the last decade, nearly 1,500 Pakistani military officers have received training in Turkey. The two are already collaborating on drone production, while Turkish and Pakistani troops held joint counter-terror exercises with Uzbek forces in Uzbekistan in April 2019. Both could soon join forces to develop and co-produce their own fighter jet after which they could go in together on a stealth fighter. Turkish military attaches from each branch of its armed forces have been posted in the Pakistani embassy in Ankara, and Turkey helped upgrade a batch of F-16 fighter jets for the Pakistan Air Force, manufacturing engines as well as spare parts. Both countries have come even closer militarily owing to security situation around their neighbors as well as due to instability in ties with the US recently. In November 2019, Navies of both countries participated in drills in the Mediterranean and Arabian Sea.

=== Syrian conflict ===
In 2020, both the Iranian and Turkish government were claimed to be recruiting Pakistani mercenaries to fight for their individual causes in Syria. The Iranian regime was claimed to be recruiting somewhere from 900-1200 Pakistani fighters trained by the Iranian armed forces while Turkey's government was set to recruit some 1400 militants, also from Pakistan, to assist the Turkish government fighting against opposing sides. These two opposing groups of Pakistani mercenaries were set to fight one another in Syria.

An unnamed Turkish military official claimed that more than 50 Pakistani militants were killed by Turkish armed forces that were fighting for the Iranian side.

=== Mecca Defence Alliance ===
On 7 August 2026, Pakistan, Saudi Arabia and Turkey signed the Mecca Defence Alliance in Mecca, Saudi Arabia. The agreement was signed by Pakistani Prime Minister Shehbaz Sharif, Saudi Crown Prince and Prime Minister Mohammed bin Salman, and Turkish President Recep Tayyip Erdoğan. It established a framework for trilateral defence cooperation and mutual security. Under the agreement, an armed attack against any one of the three countries is to be regarded as an attack against all three. The agreement is intended to strengthen collective deterrence and defence cooperation among the three states. It does not, however, specify an automatic military response or establish an integrated military command comparable to that of NATO.

The agreement was concluded amid heightened security tensions in the Middle East and followed an expansion of Strategic Mutual Defence Agreement between Pakistan and Saudi Arabia. Pakistan had previously deployed fighter and support aircraft to Saudi Arabia in April 2026 under a bilateral strategic joint defence agreement. Pakistani officials described the trilateral agreement as defensive in nature and said it could remain open to participation by other countries. The agreement has been compared by some commentators with NATO's collective-defence principle, although analysts have noted differences in the three countries' strategic priorities and military structures. The agreement also marked an expansion of Pakistan–Turkey defence relations beyond their established bilateral cooperation.

== Aid exchange ==
In the aftermath of the 2005 Kashmir earthquake, Turkey stepped up its efforts to help the Pakistani people of the affected areas. Turkey announced a package of $150 million for the quake-hit people. The Turkish aid organization Kizilay also constructed a mosque in Pakistan's azad Kashmir region bordering Indian Jammu & Kashmir. The mosque is being built in the Ottoman Style in Pakistan's Bagh District.

Pakistan supplied Turkey with aid during the 1999 earthquake and during the 2011 Van earthquake.

=== 2022 Pakistan floods ===
During the 2022 floods in Pakistan which left a fraction of the country submerged in water, Turkey's government sent planes of humanitarian relief packages to Pakistan for civilians directly affected by the floods.

=== 2023 Earthquake in Turkey ===
Prime Minister Shehbaz Sharif offered support to Turkey after a devastating earthquake. He sent 100 tons of relief goods, including food, medicine, and winterized tents and established an air bridge for transporting additional aid. He also called for a nationwide support campaign and made an appeal to the business community, religious scholars, and philanthropic organizations to contribute to the relief efforts.

== Migrant crisis and crime ==
The issue of Pakistani migrants entering Turkey illegally with the ambition of reaching Europe for better living conditions. However not all of them make it, and eventually end up being stranded in Turkey. This has been a cause of great concern to Turkish authorities, whom have tightened their borders with neighboring European countries. Some of these illegals are alleged to have been involved in crime which has caused a great deal of negative sentiments towards Pakistanis by Turkish residents. More recently, the Pakistani Federal Intelligence Agency (FIA) has been taking action against human traffickers.

It is estimated that some 5000 to 6000 Pakistanis reside in Turkey illegally, although the number keeps changing and the exact number is not yet known.

More recently Pakistani illegal migrants have rerouted to Europe via other routes besides Turkey.

Social media claims have been made that plenty of Afghans live illegally in Turkey on fake Pakistani passports and commit crimes there, including harassing women and girls.

Separate incidents of Pakistani tourists taking inappropriate videos of local Turkish women and girls have also caused social media outrage. Two of these tourists, Muhammed Junaid and Ameer Khan were under the suspicion of the FIA of being involved in crime before they visited Turkey. After their arrest and deportation from Turkey, they were arrested by FIA officials at Islamabad airport and were scheduled to face criminal charges.

The situation of illegal Pakistani migrants in Greece and Turkey, including criminals evading prosecution in Pakistan had become severe that the Pakistani federal intelligence opened offices in both countries amongst others to help track down and remove these people. The FIA also intends to open offices in other countries where illegal migrants and criminals have become a problem.

== Twin towns – sister cities ==
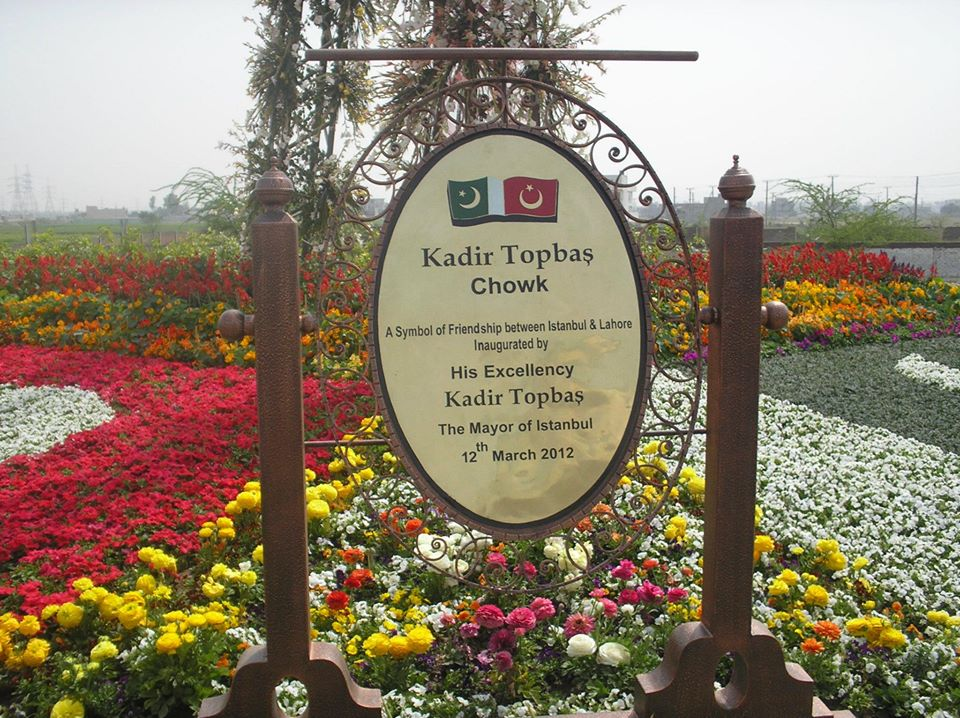
Kadir Topbaş Chowk in Lahore, Pakistan inaugurated by Kadir Topbaş, The Mayor of Istanbul (Turkey) on 12 March 2012

Several Pakistan and Turkey cities and municipalities are twinned, including:

- Islamabad with Ankara
- Karachi with Istanbul & İzmir
- Hyderabad with Antalya
- Bağcılar with Muzaffargarh

== See also ==
- Embassy of Pakistan, Ankara
- Foreign relations of Pakistan
- Foreign relations of Turkey
- Abdur Rehman Peshawari, Turkish soldier, journalist and diplomat born in Peshawar, British India
- Turks in Pakistan
