= Abdur Rahman Peshawari =

Turkish soldier, journalist and diplomat born in Peshawar

- Turkish: Abdurrahman Peşaveri; Urdu: عبد الرحمن پشاوری
- Born: Abdur Rahman Samdani Peshawari; 1886; Peshawar, Punjab, British Indian Empire now Peshawar, Khyber Pakhtunkhwa, Pakistan)
- Died: 1925 (aged 38–39); Istanbul, Istanbul Province, Turkey
- Cause of death: Assassination (Gunshot wound)
- Other name: Peşaverli Abdurrahman Bey
- Education: Muhammadan Anglo-Oriental College
- Occupations: Soldier; medic; journalist; diplomat
- Years active: 1912–1925
- Father: Haji Ghulam Samdani
- Relatives: Mian Abdul Aziz (brother); Mohammed Yahya (brother); Mohammad Yunus (brother)
- Military service
- Allegiance: Ottoman Empire
- Branch: Ottoman Army
- Service years: 1913–1918
- Conflicts: World War I Turkish War of Independence

1st Turkish Ambassador to Afghanistan
- In office 1920–1922
- Prime Minister: Mustafa Kemal Atatürk
- Preceded by: Post created
- Succeeded by: Fakhri Pasha

Abdur Rahman Peshawari (Turkish: Abdurrahman Peşaveri; Urdu: عبدالرحمن پشاوری; (Note: Kashmiri: عبدالرحمن پشاوری; Hindko: عبدالرحمن پشوری; Pashto: عبدالرحمن پېښوری) 1886–1925), also known as Abdurrahman Bey (Turkish: Peşaverli Abdurrahman Bey), was a Turkish soldier, journalist and diplomat who was born in Peshawar in British India (now Pakistan).

Born into a wealthy family of Kashmiri–Pashtun heritage, he completed his schooling in Peshawar and attended the prestigious Muhammadan Anglo-Oriental College in Aligarh. A Muslim nationalist, Peshawari left his education and journeyed to Ottoman Turkey in 1912 among a group of volunteer medics from British India to aid Ottoman forces in the Balkan War. At the end of the war, he chose to stay behind in Turkey and joined the Ottoman Army, earning a distinguished military career participating in the First World War. He also briefly worked as a journalist for Anadolu Agency. In 1920, he was appointed by Mustafa Kemal Atatürk as Turkey's first envoy to Afghanistan.

In 1925, he was the target of an assassination attempt in Istanbul in what is believed to be a case of mistaken identity, and died of gunshot wounds a month later in a hospital.

== Early life ==
=== Family background ===
Abdur Rahman Peshawari was born in 1886 in Peshawar, in what was then the Punjab Province – but in 1901 became part of the North-West Frontier Province (NWFP) – of British India (now Khyber Pakhtunkhwa, Pakistan) to the city's prominent Samdani family. Paternally, his family was of Kashmiri Muslim origin; Peshawari's father, Haji Ghulam Samdani (c. 1827–1926), moved to Peshawar in the late 19th century where he became a prosperous businessman and philanthropist. The family were noted to be speakers of Peshawar's Hindko dialect. According to Faiz Ahmed, Peshawari also had (maternal) Waziri origins and was an ethnic Pashtun. He is described by sources as a "Kashmiri-origin Pashtun."

Peshawari's father worked as a contractor for the government and military of British India, and was one of Peshawar's wealthiest individuals. He reportedly owned large tracts of forest and agricultural land in the NWFP, Punjab and Kashmir, as well as much of the Qissa Khwani Bazaar in Peshawar. The Qasim Ali Khan Mosque located within this bazaar was renovated and expanded by his father in the 1920s. According to one source, Samdani donated several neighbouring shops and a house in the area for the mosque's extension, and these renovations took place in 1884 as per a Persian inscription inside the mosque. The graves of his father and three of Peshawari's brothers are interred in the precincts of the mosque. The family's haveli was located in the Kohati Gate area of Peshawar's old city.

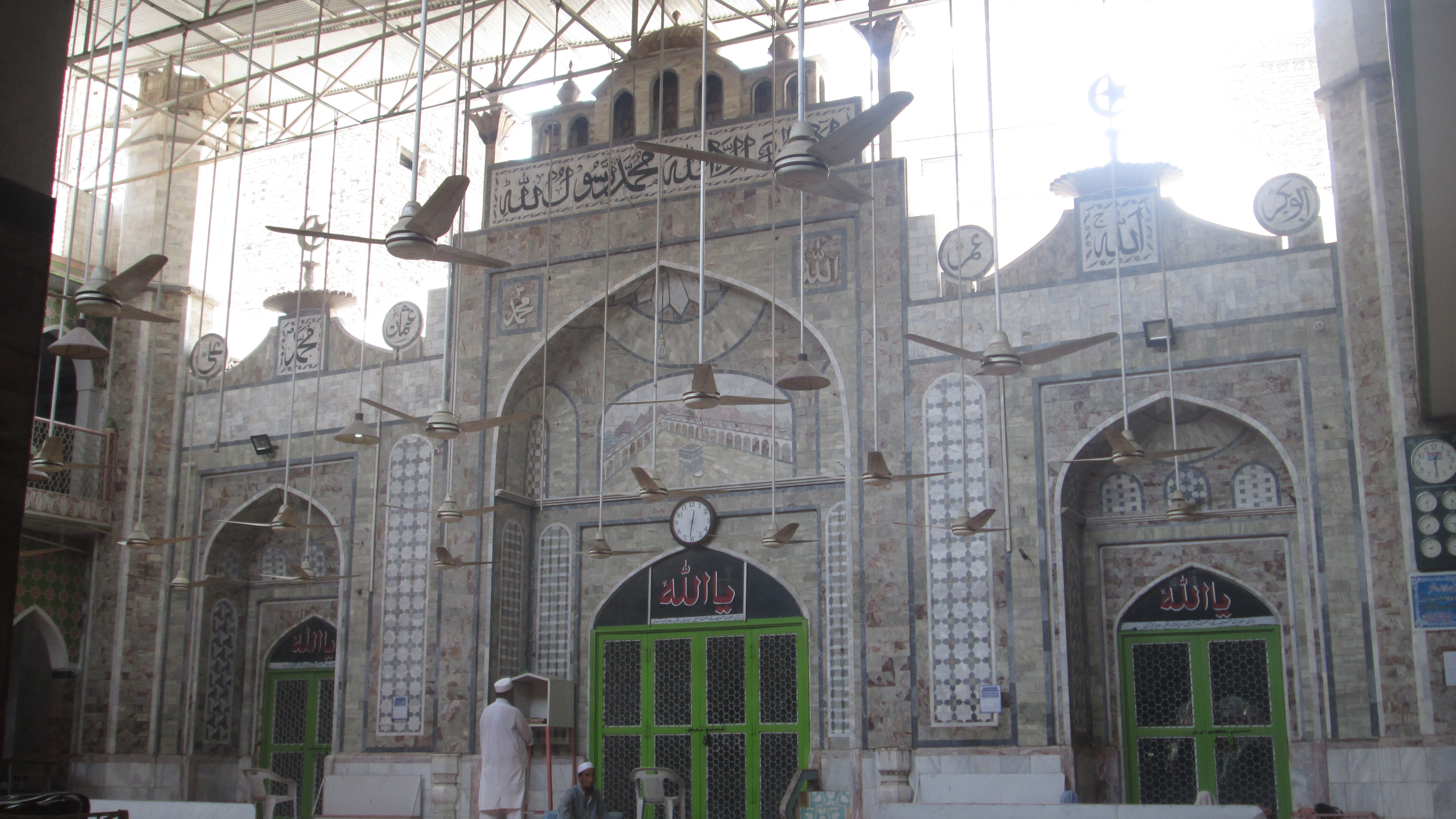
Interior of Peshawar's Qasim Ali Khan Mosque. The tombs of Peshawari's father and three brothers are interred in the mosque's precinct.

Peshawari had many siblings and half-siblings paternally; prominent amongst them was Mian Abdul Aziz (d. 1946), who was the first Muslim from the NWFP to complete a bar-at-law from England. Aziz was also one of the confidantes of Muhammad Ali Jinnah, and a key member of the All-India Muslim League (AIML) which campaigned for an independent Pakistan during British rule. He first joined the London Muslim League during his student days, and then led the Frontier Muslim League as its first president until it was dissolved. In 1917, he went to Delhi, and would eventually become the president of the AIML itself in 1933. In 1934, he abdicated his position in deference to Jinnah, ultimately unifying the various AIML factions under the latter's leadership. Aziz spent the later part of his life preaching Islam, including spending a year in Japan in 1935 where he delivered a series of lectures and inaugurated Japan's first mosque at Kobe.

Peshawari's other siblings included Mohammed Yahya (1901–1990), a Pakistani politician who was elected to the NWFP Legislative Assembly in 1946, and served as the provincial minister for education under Khan Abdul Jabbar Khan's cabinet; and Mohammad Yunus (1916–2001), an Indian independence movement activist who remained in India after the partition of British India, and served as the country's ambassador to Indonesia, Iraq, Turkey and Algeria – as well as becoming a nominated member of the Rajya Sabha in 1989. Peshawari was also closely related to the family of Abdul Ghaffar Khan. Due to his association with Turkey in later life, he became known amongst his family members as Chacha Turkey ("Uncle Turkey") or Lala Turkey ("Brother Turkey").

=== Education ===
Peshawari studied at the Edwards High School in Peshawar, and excelled at sports. He then proceeded to Aligarh to pursue his higher education at the Muhammadan Anglo-Oriental College (MAO College), which would later become the famed Aligarh Muslim University. During its initial years when it was facing financial difficulties, his father funded the institution on the request of Sir Syed Ahmad Khan.

== Medical mission ==
While Peshawari was studying at Aligarh, the Balkan Wars broke out in Europe in 1912, in which the Turkish Ottoman Empire faced a revolt from a group of allied Balkan states. In the Indian subcontinent, which at that time was under British rule, there had been an ongoing resurgence of pan-Islamic nationalism, as also evidenced many years later through the pro-Ottoman Khilafat Movement. As expressed by viceroy Lord Hardinge in a communiqué sent to Lord Crewe, the Secretary for India, he did not think the "Foreign Office in London sufficiently appreciated the difficulties" which the government in British India was facing with its Muslim subjects over Turkey. The news of the European aggression against the Turks was met with strong public support for the Ottoman Empire; in the North-West Frontier Province, a relief fund was established to which ordinary civilians contributed generously, providing financial assistance to the ailing Turks. At MAO College, an educational institution whose roots lay in the Islamic renaissance-inspired Aligarh Movement, there was great sympathy for the Turkish cause. A meeting was held at the college during which it was decided that a team of medics from Aligarh would be assembled and dispatched to Turkey to provide medical aid, as well as assist wounded Turkish soldiers on the war front.

The delegation, known as the "People's Mission to the Ottoman Empire," was put together by Dr. Mukhtar Ahmed Ansari and consisted of 24 members, comprising five doctors and 19 supporting medics. Abdur Rahman Siddiqui and Chaudhry Khaliquzzaman were amongst the members. One of the original objectives of the mission was also to provide medical attention to the ailing Ottoman Sultan. Peshawari, who himself was a passionate Muslim nationalist, immediately volunteered for the cause as a paramedic and decided to quit his studies. Aged around 26 at the time, he sold off his personal belongings in order to raise funds for the traveling and did not initially contact his family – visiting them only before he was to depart, as he was certain that his father, who wanted him to strictly pursue his education, would not have approved his decision. Since he did not have experience as a medic, he completed a training course in paramedicine and first aid to qualify for the mission. In 1912, he and his team sailed aboard an Italian ship Sardegna from Bombay on 15 December 1912 for the Ottoman capital Istanbul, amidst a mammoth public sendoff arranged earlier at Delhi's Jama Masjid, where the atmosphere was charged with the speech of Hakim Ajmal Khan. This trend continued across stations in India wherever the team stopped and traveled throughout the first two weeks of December. The mission was hailed by notable Muslim figures like Shibli Nomani, Mohammad Ali Jauhar and Abul Kalam Azad. The sentiments of the people were appropriately encapsulated by Ansari thus: "It was the first time that the Muslims of India had collectively sent a mission for helping Muslims abroad during the British rule." It docked at Aden and Suez, where the team were greeted with cheering crowds, before changing ships at Alexandria, and arriving at Istanbul two weeks later.

During the course of their assignment in Turkey which lasted six months, the activities of the medical mission received press coverage and the Ottoman Sultan reportedly invited the team to his palace to thank them for their contributions. Peshawari also joined the Ottoman Red Crescent Society, which brought financial aid from Muslims in British India and provided medical equipment and relief to Ottoman soldiers engaged in the Balkans. The mission was covered positively back home by Indian newspapers, especially Al-Hilal. When the delegation returned to British India, a meeting was held in Bombay to welcome its members. It was attended by eminent Muslim leaders, including Altaf Hussain Hali.

== Military career ==
Following the end of the Balkans conflict, the members of the medical delegation had returned to the subcontinent by 4 July 1913. Peshawari, however, decided to stay back in Turkey, becoming a naturalised citizen and serving the country for his remaining lifetime. He joined the Ottoman Army as a lieutenant. Another colleague of Peshawari's from the medical mission, Mirza Abdul Qayyum, also joined the Turkish forces; Abdul Qayyum would later be killed during World War I.

Peshawari was trained closely by Rauf Orbay, whom he is said to have regarded as a "younger brother". He received military training first in Istanbul and then in Beirut, until World War I started.

=== World War I ===
At the start of World War I, Peshawari was deployed to the Dardanelles as part of the Ottoman Army's Gallipoli campaign in the Middle Eastern theatre, and commanded a military contingent. He proved his gallantry, partaking in several battles against the Allied Powers. He was wounded thrice during the war while fighting against the Royal British Navy. Eventually, the Ottomans won the Gallipoli campaign and repelled the invading forces.

=== Turkish War of Independence ===
When the Ottoman Empire suffered losses in World War I and Istanbul came under the occupation of the Allies, Peshawari became part of the Turkish War of Independence led by Mustafa Kemal Atatürk who, as head of the Turkish National Movement, established a provisional government in Ankara aiming for the restoration of Turkish sovereignty. These events accompanied the gradual dissolution of the Ottoman Empire. Peshawari was one of numerous Pashtun and British Indian Muslims who served in the Turkish Army during that war. Eventually, he witnessed the establishment of an independent Turkish Republic.

== Journalism ==
Peshawari had a brief career in journalism. He became one of the earliest reporters of Turkey's Anadolu Agency, shortly after it was founded in 1920 during the war of independence. He was the news agency's first foreign affairs officer. Working alongside its renowned founders Halide Edib Adıvar and Yunus Nadi Abalıoğlu, Peshawari was based in a small office where he covered news stories on wartime events in Anatolia as a correspondent. As described impressionably in Abalıoğlu's memoirs, he would work with only one finger "flying" over a typewriter.

== Diplomatic career ==
In 1920, Peshawari was appointed by the Turkish government as its first ever envoy to Afghanistan. The reason for the appointment was twofold: to strengthen Turkey's ties with Afghanistan, as both countries were fighting for independence from European imperialism, and for Turkey to receive information about conditions in Afghanistan. Peshawari was personally chosen by Kemal Atatürk due to his knowledge of the region (especially the Indo-Afghan frontier) and because he was well known in the Turkish Army. Additionally, due to his heritage in Peshawar, he was fluent in both Pashto and Persian, the two national languages of Afghanistan; he was also fluent in English.

Peshawari arrived in Kabul in 1921, passing via Erzerum and Moscow, and delivered a letter from Atatürk to the monarch Amanullah Khan. His post was titled as a "special envoy". He served in the position until June 1922, following which the post was converted into a full-fledged ambassadorial role due to the Turkish Republic's independence. During his tenure in Kabul, he promoted bilateral relations by financing various development projects, particularly in the field of education. He was succeeded by Fakhri Pasha.

== Political views ==
Described as a "revolutionary" in early Turkish sources, Peshawari neither married nor ever returned home to Peshawar, refusing to abandon Turkey until the time that it was fully liberated from foreign occupation. Later when he became the Turkish envoy in Afghanistan, he maintained close contacts with members of the Provisional Government of India based in exile in Kabul, who sought to achieve the Indian subcontinent's independence from the British Empire, a cause that he fully supported. He was such a staunch supporter of the independence movement that he reportedly declined an offer from the British authorities to visit his hometown of Peshawar, vowing not to set foot on the subcontinent so long as it remained part of the British Raj – despite the fact that Peshawar, located just across the border, was the closest city of British India to Kabul. He extended his support to independence activists like Ubaidullah Sindhi.

== Assassination ==
In 1925, Peshawari was shot in the back during an assassination attempt in Istanbul. He remained hospitalised for a month but died from his injuries. His death was mourned in Turkey, British India and Afghanistan. Peshawari's assassination is supposed to have been a case of mistaken identity; Rauf Orbay, the politician and naval commander who served as Turkey's first prime minister after the independence war, had been the intended target of the Armenian shooter. Peshawari reportedly bore a close physical resemblance to Orbay, whom he was also acquainted with personally, and was mistaken for him by the killer. He is buried in Istanbul. His material possessions, which included his medals, uniform, and personal diary were handed over to his brother Abdul Aziz, but were confiscated by the British authorities in India.

== Legacy ==
In 1979, Peshawari's younger brother, Muhammad Yusuf, published a book called Ghazi Abdur Rehman Peshawari Shaheed, chronicling the elder brother's life. The younger brother had collected materials documenting the elder brother's life over a number of years. He had originally requested Sir Abdul Qadir to author the book, who gave the project to his student Hafeez Hoshiarpuri. Hoshiarpuri completed a partial manuscript, before passing the task to Abu Salman Shahjahanpuri who finally completed the book.

During a state visit to Pakistan in 2016, Turkish president Recep Tayyip Erdoğan publicly acknowledged Peshawari's legacy and services to his adopted nation during a speech to a joint session of the Pakistani parliament. He highlighted him as one of many notable figures featuring in the historically close relationship between modern Pakistan and Turkey.

In January 2021, it was reported that Pakistan and Turkey would jointly produce a historical television series titled Lala Turki based on Peshawari's life. The series would also depict the contribution that Muslims from the subcontinent had in Turkey's independence struggles. Pakistan's prime minister Imran Khan discussed the project with leading Turkish director Kemal Tekden. The series will be a joint venture between Tekden Films and Pakistan's Ansari Films.

== See also ==
- Foreign relations of the Ottoman Empire
- History of Peshawar
- Khilafat Movement
- Muslim nationalism in South Asia

== Notes ==
Diplomatic posts
Preceded by Post created	Turkish Ambassador to Afghanistan; 1920–1922	Succeeded by Fakhri Pasha
