= Afghanistan–Turkey relations =

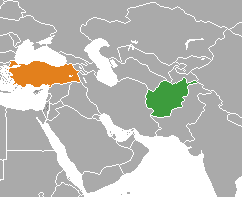

- Afghanistan: Turkey

Diplomatic mission
- Afghan Embassy, Ankara: Embassy of Turkey, Kabul

Ahmet Davutoğlu has described bilateral relations between Afghanistan and Turkey as "exemplary" even if the two countries do not border each other, but are close. Afghanistan was the second nation to recognize the Republic of Turkey, after the Soviet Union, on 1 March 1923.

Both countries established education and cultural exchange programs. Turkish schools were established in Afghanistan. Furthermore, Turkish army officers assisted or even commanded the training of Afghan military members. The foreign relations of Afghanistan have changed so much politically, socially, and economically. Today the relations between the two countries go beyond giving military education. Afghanistan has an embassy in Ankara and a consulate-general in Istanbul, while Turkey has an embassy in Kabul. Turkey is a large aid provider to Afghanistan.

== History ==
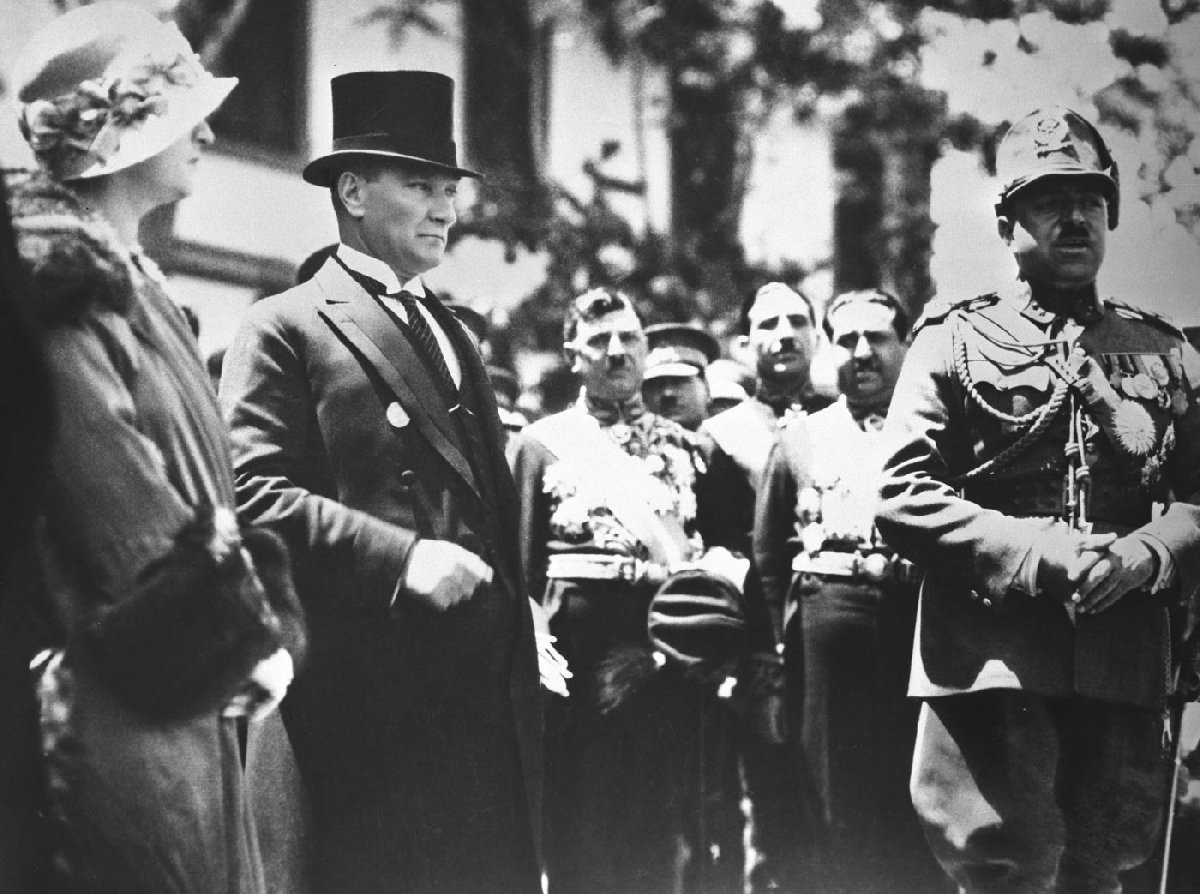
First Turkish President, Mustafa Kemal Atatürk with King Amānullāh Khān of Afghanistan (on the right) in Ankara in 1928

Afghanistan and Turkey relations span several centuries, as many Turkic and Afghan peoples ruled vast areas of Central Asia and the Middle East particularly the Ghaznavids, Seljuks, Khalji, Timurid, Mughal, Afsharid and Durrani empires. Throughout its long history, many Ottoman officials were in close contact with Afghan leaders even up until the early 20th century when the Ottoman administrator Ahmad Jamal Pasha went to Afghanistan to help modernize the Afghan armed forces. Ertuğrul Osman, the former head of the Imperial Ottoman Dynasty, was married to Zeynep Tarzi Hanım Efendi, the daughter of Abdulfettah Tarzi, niece of the former King of Afghanistan, Amanullah Khan.

Afghanistan's heavy influence on the Atatürk regime further developed the brotherly relations between the two nations. Atatürk had supported Mahmud Tarzi and he had hopes of introducing Kemalism into neighbouring Afghanistan. Following the death of Mustafa Kemal Atatürk, Afghanistan was deeply saddened, and Amanullah Khan, who was in exile in Rome made a special attendance. Afghanistan's support for Atatürk is further shown by being the only nation, apart from Turkey, to have kept their flag at half-mast, to initiate a week of mourning. Despite the strong visibility of the Taliban in the east of the country, Atatürk's legacy still remains intact within Afghanistan, and March 1 is celebrated to commemorate Afghanistan's recognition of the Republic of Turkey.

Talks held in Moscow on 1 March 1921 resulted in the Turkey-Afghanistan Alliance Agreement and a period of intense cooperation. In 1937, shortly before the outbreak of World War II, Afghanistan, Iran, Iraq and Turkey signed the Treaty of Saadabad.

== Modern relations ==
=== The War on Terror ===
Turkey has participated in the International Security Assistance Force (ISAF) since its inception with the deployment of 290- non-combatant support personnel in 2001 and has assumed command of ISAF II (June 2002 – February 2003) and ISAF VII (February–August 2005). According to Turkish Parliamentary Deputy Burhan Kayatürk; Turkey, which has the goodwill of the Afghani people, “can help win the hearts and minds of the Afghan people,” who, “like the Turkish soldiers,” and, “steer them away from militancy by strengthening the infrastructure in education, health and industry.”

Turkish troops have not participated as combat forces but rather as logistical support and training Afghan personnel. Over 12,000 Afghan soldiers and police have been trained.

Turkish construction firms have subsequently also become active in the country. Turkey is responsible for maintaining security around Kabul, providing training for the Afghan Armed Forces and Afghan National Police and have undertaken a number of reconstruction projects in the fields of education, health, and agriculture in the province of Vardak. Turkey's support of the Bonn Agreement and the Afghan Constitution Commission resulted in an official visit to Turkey by Afghan President Hamid Karzai on April 4, 2002, and made a reciprocal visit to Afghanistan by Turkish Prime Minister Recep Tayyip Erdoğan a short time later.

=== Trilateral Ankara cooperation process ===
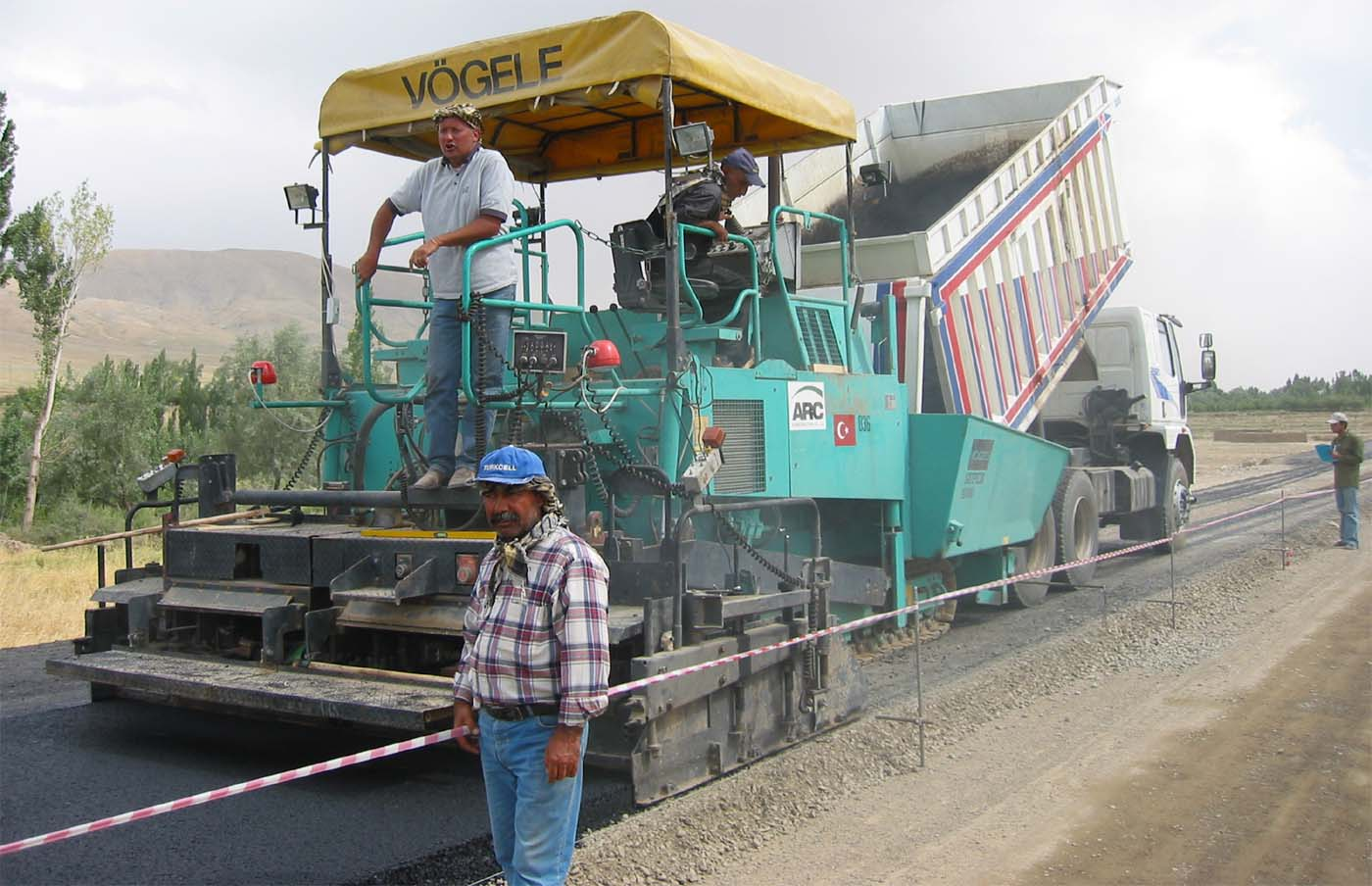
Turkish aid to Afghanistan includes the construction of new roads.

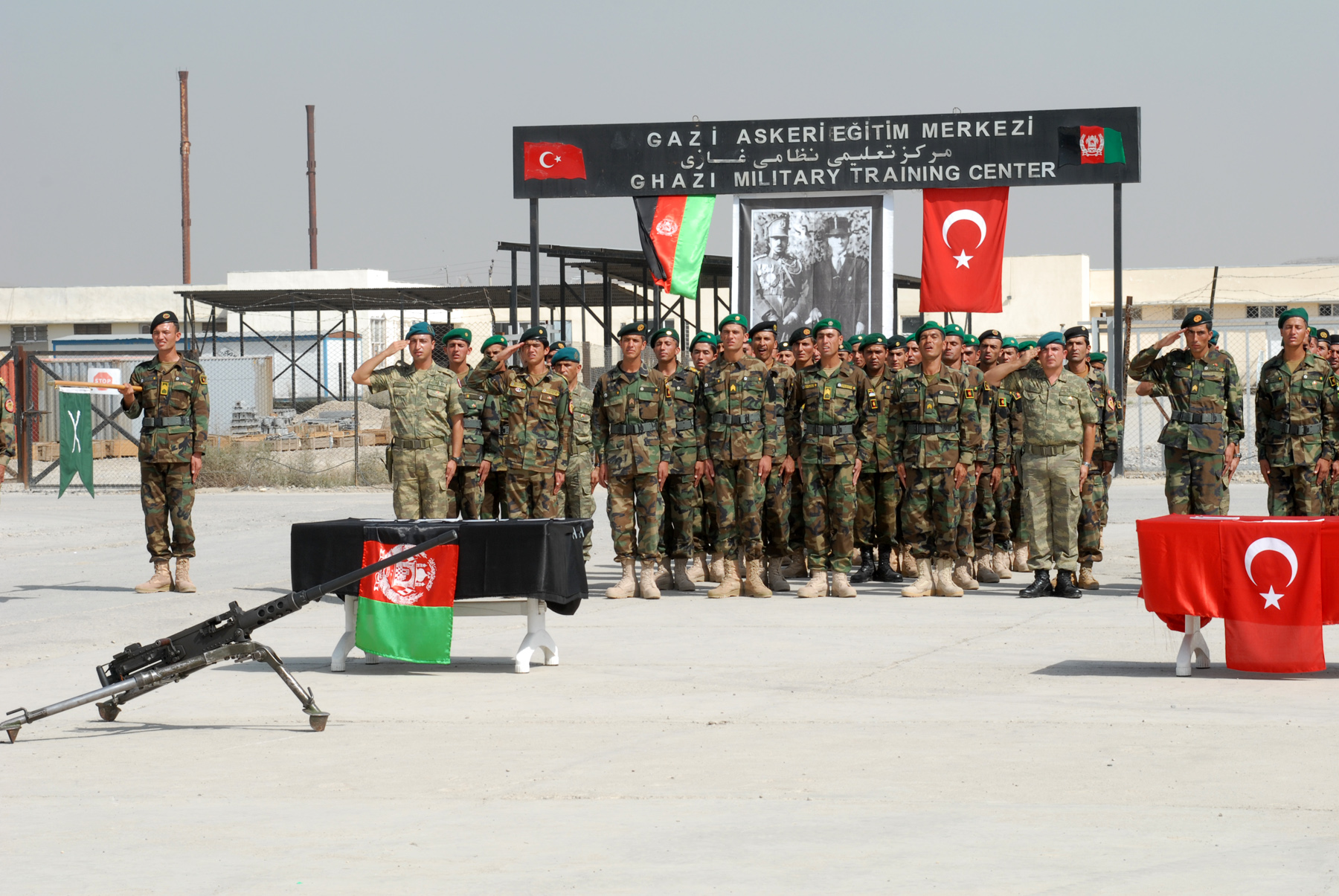
A group of Afghan non-commissioned officers who graduated from a training course led by Turkish Army officers

Turkey launched a trilateral summit process between the two states and Pakistan in February 2007, following a visit by then Turkish Foreign Minister Abdullah Gül to Islamabad, as the backbone of its diversified foreign policy in South Asia and Pakistani deputy Humair Hayat Khan Rokhri confirmed that according to Gül “we are all brothers who need to support each other,” in order to, “bring security and stability to the region.”

An April 1, 2009 meeting between Afghan and Pakistani leaders, conducted as part of the trilateral Ankara cooperation process, saw the three countries pledged to increase coordination between their political, military, and intelligence tiers in the fight against militancy and terrorism. Turkish Parliamentary Deputy Kayatürk has stated that, “It is the first time that the military and intelligence chiefs of Afghanistan and Pakistan have attended the trilateral summit, which is a reflection of the deeper commitment to work together.”

Afghan and Pakistani parliamentary deputies came together in Ankara on May 5, as part of the trilateral Ankara cooperation process, where they met with the previous Turkish President Gül and new Foreign Minister Ahmet Davutoğlu to discuss a variety of issues. Head of the Turkish Parliament's Foreign Relations Commission Murat Mercan stated;

“Today we need cooperation between our countries more than ever. I believe Turkey, having historical brotherhood relations with both, is in a special position to improve and deepen this cooperation. Turkey is confident that the cooperation to be established between Afghanistan and Pakistan will help a lot to solve the problems.”

Vice-chairman of the Afghan Parliament's Foreign Relations Commission Mohammed Shakir Kargar responded by reaffirming this historical friendship built upon by Atatürk and thanked Turkey for its help with the post-Taliban restructuring. Mercan concluded, “We are finally on the verge of institutionalizing the trilateral Ankara cooperation process within the framework of parliamentary joint initiatives,” with follow-up meetings due to be held in Islamabad and Kabul at four-month intervals.

After the very controversial 2009 election, President Karzai visited the President of Turkey in November 2009 to consolidate relations with other stakeholders in the region. The president of Turkey affirmed that Turkey had to take an active part in stabilizing the region, taking up the torch of western activity in the region and specifically in Afghanistan.

=== Afghan Embassy ===
The Embassy of Afghanistan in Ankara (Persian: سفارت كبرای امارت اسلامی افغانستان در انقره) is the diplomatic mission of the Islamic Emirate of Afghanistan to Turkey. It is located at Cinnah Street 88, Kavaklıdere, Çankaya. The Embassy was handed over to the Taliban in February 2025.

The current Afghan ambassador to Turkey is Saniullah Farahmand since June 2025.

In March 2021, Turkey said that very high-level discussions will take place in April 2021 in Istanbul about the issue of peace with Afghanistan, noting that Turkey will appoint a special envoy for Afghanistan. In February 2023, Turkey, now officially known as Türkiye, agreed to reduce diplomatic mission in Afghanistan amid reports of ISIL managing to infiltrate Kabul's Green Zone, where the Turkish embassy in Afghanistan is located, with explosive-laden vehicles.

== See also ==
- Afghan Turkestan
- Anti-Afghan sentiment in Turkey
