= Turks in Pakistan =

Pakistan'daki Türkler (Turkish)
- (Turkey) (Pakistan)

Total population
- 2500

Regions with significant populations
- Karachi, Lahore, Islamabad, Peshawar, Gilgit, Hazara, Bhakkar, Jhang, Skardu, Abbottabad, Toba Tek Singh

Religion
- Islam

Turks in Pakistan (Turkish: Pakistan'daki Türkler) are ethnic Turkish people living in Pakistan. These terms are also used to refer to Pakistani-born individuals who are of full or partial Turkish ancestry.

Turkish educators in Pakistan are involved with the PakTurk International Schools and Colleges, which has 25 branches in the country. As of 2016, there were over 100 Turkish educators teaching at these schools, and including their families has a population of 400 Turks.

== History ==
Turkish people started coming to post-colonial Pakistan in any given numbers when the two countries established diplomatic relations following Pakistan's independence, although a number had come even before that. By the late 70s, a number of Turks began to reside in Pakistan to escape the Political violence in Turkey (1976–1980).

== Afghan War (2001-2021) ==
Numerous Turks in Pakistan were suspected of being affiliated with Afghan insurgent groups such as the Haqqani network during the Afghan war and fought against NATO and Pakistani troops from the Khyber Pakhtunkhwa region.

The Turkish jihadist militant group identifying by the name of Taifatul Mansura ("Victorious Sect") were actively fighting in Waziristan, likely entering from Afghanistan, with a score of them killed by American predator drone strikes. Their commander, Abu Zarr, was killed by the Taliban who described him as "dangerous" and "uncontrollable." Zarr had been previously involved in conflicts in the Caucasus before being killed in Afghanistan. He was described as the leader of Al-Queda's unit in Turkey.

A few of these were also Turks of German citizenship such as Mounir Chouka. Some of these also brought native Germans converted to Islam and radicalized such as Eric Breininger, who was brought to the Afghan-Pakistani border and was killed in a firefight with Pakistani forces. Another three German citizens, possibly of Turkish ethnicity, were killed in an airstrike launched by the Pakistan Air Force (PAF) in Northern Waziristan in early 2014, which also killed up to thirty-three Uzbek militants.

== Pak-Turk schools ==
In April 1995, Pak-Turk Maarif schools and colleges were launched and Turkish teachers were hired.

== Notable people ==
- Hassan Ali Effendi, was an educationist in South Asia
- Asif Ali Zardari, Pakistani politician
- Adil Murad, is a Pakistani film producer and actor
- Atif Bashir, German-born footballer with a Pakistani father and Turkish mother, playing for the Pakistan national football team
- Tipu Sharif, actor and singer-songwriter
- Waheed Murad, was a Pakistani film actor, producer and script writer

== See also ==
- Pakistan–Turkey relations
- Turkish diaspora
- Immigration to Pakistan
- Kurds in Pakistan
- Turk Jamat
- Tanoli
