= Mohammed Yahya =

Pakistani politician

Mohammed Yahya (also known as Mohammed Yahya Jan; 20 March 1901 – 4 March 1990) was primarily an Educationist, serving as the founder and first headmaster of the Islamia High School Peshawar, the Education Minister of the N.W.F.P. and director Special Education and Princeley States.

== Early life and education ==
Mohammed Yahya was born in Peshawar, North-West Frontier Province in 1901 and was the third son of the sixth wife of Haji Ghulam Samdani, who belonged to Barra Mulla in Kashmir.

After matriculation and a bachelor's degree from Edwardes College Peshawar, Mohammed Yahya went on to Aligarh University, where he completed his MPhil in Philosophy specializing in the works of Nietzsche.

He was the only son-in-law of Khan Abdul Ghaffar Khan, the Freedom fighter and non-violent leader of the Pathans in the North-West Frontier Province

== Professional life and politics ==
After returning to Peshawar in 1934, he was approached by a group of leading Muslims from Peshawar City to set up a high school for Muslim students. Till that time the Khalsa school (Located near Dakki Nal Bandi) was the only school within the city. After consultations with the Head master of the Khalsa School and with other notables of Peshawar, he launched the Islamia High School in Peshawar city and became its first head master. In the 1946 Elections Yahya contested as a Congress Candidate against Sardar Abdul Rab Nishtar and defeated him with a heavy margin of approx 8,000 votes. He subsequently became The Minister of Education of the North West Frontier Province in Dr. Khan Sahibs 2nd Ministry. During his short stint as Education Minister (Partition of the Sub Continent in 1947 led to the dissolution of the Assembly) he put forward the proposal for Peshawar University to be established.

In the 1960s he was the Director for Special Education, Tribal Areas and Princely States.

== Notable siblings ==
- Abdur Rehman (Abdur Rehman Peshawri) (An associate of Mustafa Kemal Atatürk and Turkey's Ambassador to Afghanistan in the 1930s)
- Haji Mohammed Amin. Lala Amin's son was Hassan Amin. Two of his notable sons are Taimur Hassan, a golf champion of Pakistan and Tariq Amin the successful Stylist. There are two additional children, a daughter Tahira Amin and a son Turhan Amin.
- Muhammad Akbar Jan (1890-1948). His mother, fourth wife of Haji Ghulam Samdani (Zulekha Jan), was the first cousin of King Zahir Shah of Afghanistan. He graduated from Aligarh University, India. He was fond of football and was a football player at the provincial level. He was a friend of Khan Tamaas Khan (F/O; Fida M. Khan, ex- Governor of KPK). He went to Iran on an official trip and spent his last days of life over there. He died in 1948 and was buried in Tehran (Iran). Yaqoot Jan was the first cousin and wife of M. Akbar Jan. They had two sons, named M. Akram Jan and then M. Azam Jan. The younger son, M. Azam Jan (1918-1998) married Hashmat Jan (1934-2001), the youngest daughter of Muhammad Sardar Azam, belonged to a noble family of Peshawar city. They had three sons and a daughter, named; M. Hashim Jan (aka Muhammad Hashim Khan), Ishrat Naheed, M. Afzal Jan and Saeed Ahmed Jan. M. Hashim is the eldest son of M. Azam Jan and Hashmat Jan. He is settled in Peshawar with his wife and daughter. His siblings live in the same city with their families.
- Mohammad Yunus (A member of the Indian Foreign Service, the founder of "Pragati Maidan" in New Delhi. He was a close friend and advisor to the Gandhi family)
- Abdul Aziz Head of the all India Muslim League till Jinnah's return
- Mohammed Omer (He was issueless)
- Mohammed Naeem Jan had two sons, Mohammed Naseem Jan F/O Tariq Naseem Jan and Mohammed Usman F/O Riaz Usman
- Agha Ghulam Ahmed Samdani II landlord in Peshawar and Head of his tribe at the era and Proprietor of House of A.G.A. founded by his father in 1800s. Had 8 sons and 2 daughters. But of 8 sons who did not earn a name for themselves his only son well known to the business World taking after his Late Father Agha Ghulam Ahmed II and Grandfather Haji Agha Ghulam Samdani was Agha Khalid Ahmed who had graduated from Berkeley University California became the sole proprietor at a tender age after his father of House of A.G.A. and was also an Army contractor for supplying medical and was the sole agent in Pakistan for Fuller Co. USA, besides which he supplied cement machinery and set up most of Pakistan's main cement factories. He had travelled the World for pleasure and business trips in a time when many Pakistanis did not travel abroad so frequently.

== Offspring ==
Mohammad Saleem Jan ( Saleem Jan) (Saleem Yahya) was born in Peshawar, North-West Frontier Province in 1947. After matriculation from mission high school Peshawar and a bachelor's degree from Edwardes College Peshawar, Mohammad Saleem Jan went to Peshawar University to study for his MA in Economics. While studying at University, he was offered a job at Grindlays Bank, which he accepted.

Saleem Jan's tenure as a banker lasted more than 37 years. Having started his career with Grindlays Bank in 1968, he served in Bahrain, New York, the UAE and the UK. In 1987 he joined the Middle East Bank in Dubai as their Chief Manager Credit and Marketing. In 1991 he returned to Pakistan and helped set up Union Bank Ltd and served as its CEO and President till 1999. He was appointed the CEO and Managing Director of The Bank of Punjab in March 2000, which he served until May 2003. His final assignment was as the CEO of the ‘Rehman Medical Institute’ in Peshawar. On 25 November 2011, at a press conference at his residence, Mohammad Saleem Jan announced his joining the Pakistan Tehreek-e-Insaf of Imran Khan.

Other children include three daughters, namely Naheed Raheem, Roeeda Kabir and Dr. Shahida.
