= Zeki Levent Gümrükçü =

Turkish diplomat (born 1968)

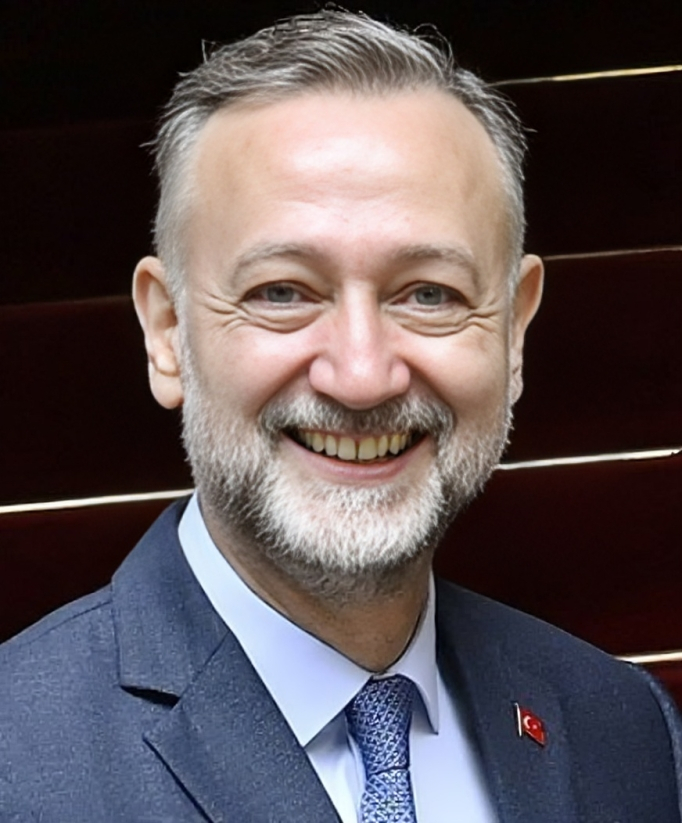

Permanent Representative of Turkey to NATO
- Incumbent
- Assumed office 15 January 2023
- Preceded by: Basat Öztürk

Ambassador to Belgium
- In office 30 November 2017 – 6 January 2020
- Preceded by: Mehmet Hakan Olcay
- Succeeded by: Hasan Ulusoy

Ambassador to Georgia
- In office 30 January 2014 – 30 November 2017
- Preceded by: Levent Murat Burhan
- Succeeded by: Ceren Yazgan

Personal details
- Born: 1968 (age 57–58) Ankara, Turkey

Zeki Levent Gümrükçü (born 1968) is a Turkish diplomat who has been the permanent representative of Turkey to NATO since 16 January 2023.

== Biography ==
Gümrükçü was born in Ankara in 1968.

He is a graduate of Ankara Atatürk Anatolian High School and Middle East Technical University, Faculty of Economics and Administrative Sciences, Department of International Relations.

He joined the Ministry of Foreign Affairs in 1990, and between 1991 and 1992 and 1992 and 1993, he served as the deputy chief of staff of the Minister of Foreign Affairs, Hikmet Çetin. He also did his military service in 1992.

He was appointed as the undersecretary at the Permanent Representation of Turkey to the United Nations in 2006, and later promoted to the first undersecretary, and served as the Political Coordinator during Turkey's membership of the UN Security Council from 2009 to 2010.

He served as Deputy Director General of Policy Planning at the Ministry of Foreign Affairs from 2011 to 2013, and as Deputy Director General of Information and Ministry of Foreign Affairs from 2013 and 2014.

On 30 January 2014, Gümrükçü became the Ambassador to Georgia.

On 30 November 2017, he became the Ambassador to Belgium, and served until 6 January 2020, where he became the Director General of the US Department of State.

On 15 January 2023, he took office as the Permanent Representative to NATO.
