= List of ambassadors of Turkey to Germany =

Ambassadors of Turkey to Germany

The list of ambassadors of Turkey to Germany provides a chronological record of individuals who have served as the diplomatic representatives of the Republic of Turkey to the many countries that existed in what is today known as the Federal Republic of Germany.

== List of ambassadors ==
=== Ambassadors resident at Berlin (1929–1944) ===
The ambassador was the diplomatic representative to Nazi Germany.

Ambassador	Term start	Term end	Ref.
Kemalettin Sami Gökçen	29 September 1929	15 April 1934	
Hamdi Arpağ	12 May 1934	31 July 1939	
Hüsrev Gerede	5 September 1939	27 July 1942	
Mustafa Saffet Arıkan	1 August 1942	17 March 1944	

=== Ambassadors resident at Bonn (1950–1999) ===
The ambassador was the diplomatic representative to West Germany.

Ambassador	Term start	Term end	Ref.
Nizamettin Ayaşlı	6 March 1950	21 September 1952	
Suad Hayri Ürgüplü	29 October 1952	26 September 1955	
Seyfullah Esin	27 December 1955	14 June 1957	
Settar İksel	19 June 1957	1 October 1961	
Mehmet Baydur	1 November 1961	9 April 1964	
Ziya Müezzinoğlu	25 August 1964	2 December 1966	
Oğuz Gökmen	3 December 1966	22 February 1972	
Vahit Halefoğlu	25 February 1972	12 September 1982	
Oktay İşcen	22 November 1982	22 August 1988	
Reşat Arım	31 August 1988	26 November 1990	
Onur Öymen	6 December 1990	16 June 1995	
Volkan Vural	30 June 1995	30 April 1998	
Tugay Uluçevik	30 April 1998	15 September 2000	

=== Ambassadors resident at Berlin (1999–present) ===
Ambassador	Term start	Term end	Ref.
Tugay Uluçevik	30 April 1998	15 September 2000	
Osman Korutürk	18 September 2000	6 September 2003	
Mehmet Ali İrtemçelik	16 October 2003	18 March 2008	
Ali Ahmet Acet	1 April 2008	31 December 2011	
Hüseyin Avni Karslıoğlu	15 January 2012	31 October 2016	
Ali Kemal Aydın	15 November 2016	16 July 2021	
Ahmet Başar Şen	1 August 2021	Present	
