= List of permanent representatives of Turkey to NATO =

List of Turkey's representatives at NATO

The list of permanent representatives of Turkey to NATO comprises diplomats responsible for representing Turkey's interests within the military alliance. The current permanent representative is Ambassador Zeki Levent Gümrükçü.

== List of permanent representatives ==
Name	Term start	Term end	Ref.
Fatin Rüştü Zorlu	18 February 1952	1 January 1954	
Mehmet Ali Tiney	1 January 1954	1 January 1957	
Selim Rauf Sarper	1 January 1957	1 January 1960	
Ali Haydar Görk	1 January 1960	1 November 1960	
Muharrem Nuri Birgi	1 November 1960	1 January 1972	
Orhan Eralp	1 January 1972	1 January 1976	
Ali Coşkun Kırca	1 January 1976	1 January 1978	
Osman Esim Olcay	1 January 1978	1 January 1988	
Tugay Özçeri	1 January 1988	1 January 1989	
Ünal Ünsal	1 January 1989	1 January 1991	
Tugay Özçeri	1 January 1991	1 January 1997	
Onur Öymen	1 January 1997	1 January 2002	
Ahmet Üzümcü	1 January 2002	1 January 2004	
Mehmet Ümit Pamir	1 January 2004	1 January 2007	
Tacan İldem	1 January 2007	9 October 2009	
Haydar Berk	9 October 2009	18 September 2013	
Mehmet Fatih Ceylan	18 September 2013	15 November 2018	
Basat Öztürk	15 November 2018	8 January 2023	
Zeki Levent Gümrükçü	12 January 2023	Present	

== See also ==
- NATO
- Ministry of Foreign Affairs
- List of diplomatic missions of Turkey
