= Tereza Maxová =

Czech model (born 1971)

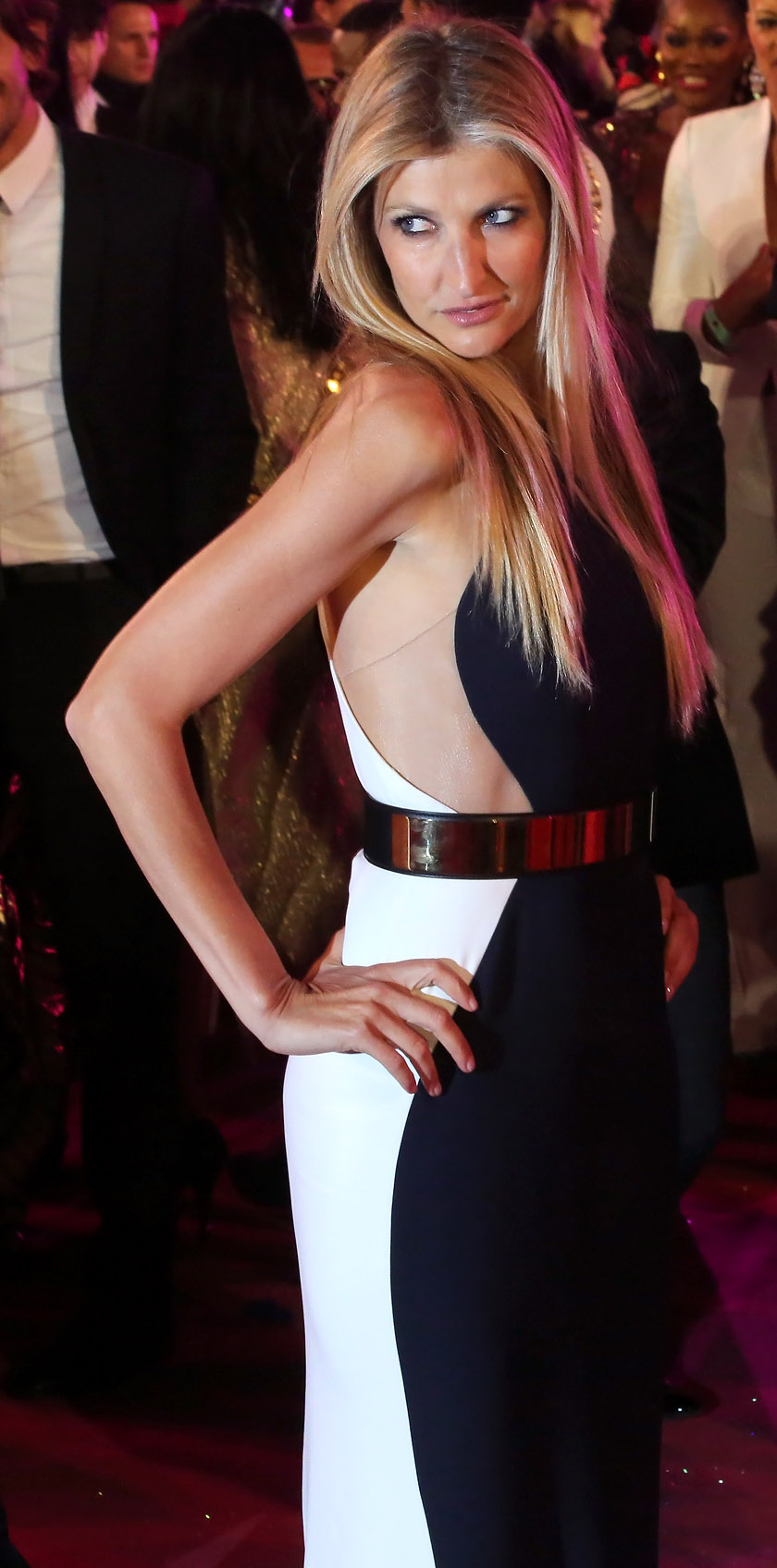
Tereza Maxová (red carpet at Life Ball 2013)

Tereza Maxová (born 31 August 1971, in Pardubice), is a Czech model.

== Biography ==
In 1975 her family moved to Ústí nad Labem, where she finished her basic school focused on sport and athletics in 1985. After passing her entrance exams she started her studies at the Gymnasium Grammar School Budějovická in Prague. After her school leaving exam in 1989 she was enrolled by the Faculty of Law of Charles University. After two years, shortly after the Velvet Revolution, she left for Paris. Tereza's father was Catholic and her mother was Jewish, and she is celebrating Christmas.

=== Career ===
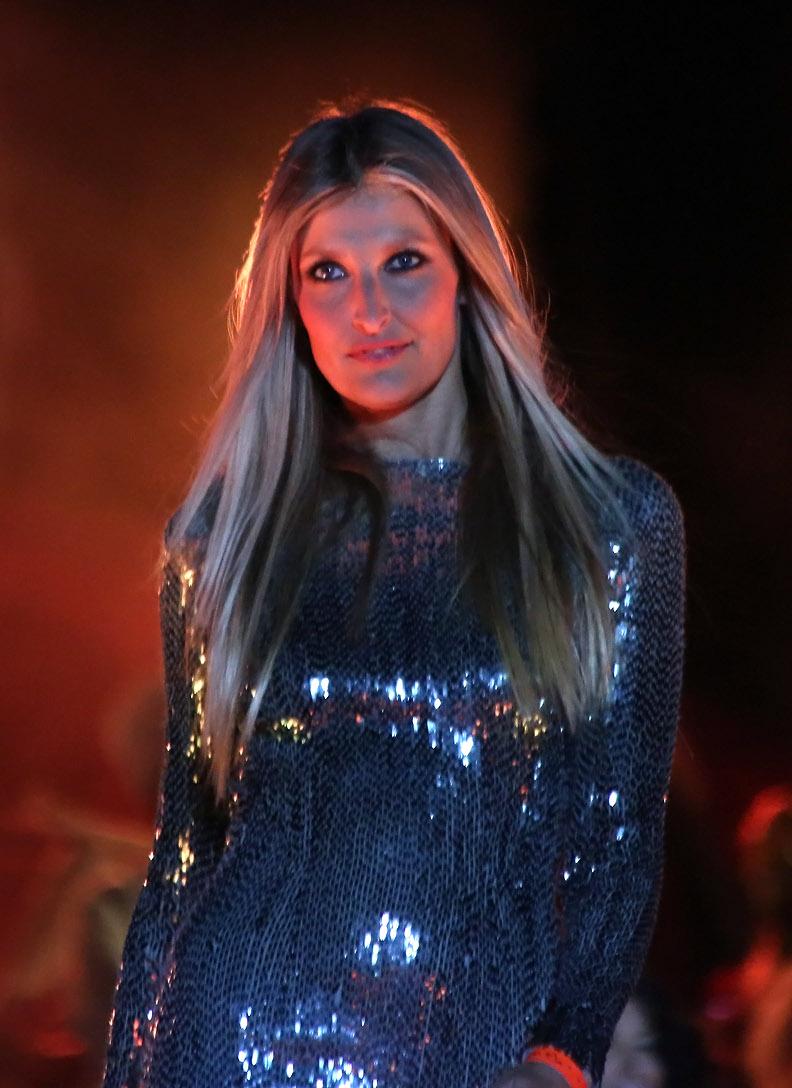
Tereza Maxová, 2013

During her career, she worked with photographers including Patrick Demarchelier, Mario Testino and Peter Lindbergh. She has appeared on the front of magazines including British Vogue, Elle, Marie Claire and Cosmopolitan.

She also modelled for Dior, Chanel, Prada, Gucci, Yves Saint Laurent and Ralph Lauren. She appeared in advertising campaigns for brands including Marks & Spencer, the Czech football team, Škoda, Karl Lagerfeld, Donna Karan, Hermes, La Perla, Vichy, Oriflame and L'Oréal.

In February 2009, she appeared on the British television show Piers Morgan on..., in the programme on Monaco.

=== Charity work ===
In 1997, Maxová established the Tereza Maxová Foundation in aid of underprivileged children in the Czech Republic. By 2009 it had sent more than 130 million crowns to support such children in foster families and children's homes.

=== Personal life ===
On 18 March 2000, Maxová married Danish tennis player Frederik Fetterlein. In September 2000, Maxová gave birth to a son named Tobias Joshua Fetterlein. After the marriage fell apart, she moved to Monaco with partner, Turkish businessman Burak Öymen who is a son of Turkish diplomat and politician Onur Öymen.

Maxová gave birth to a daughter Mína Öymen Maxová in May 2009 in Prague. and to another son named Aiden Öymen Max in September 2011. She married Burak in October 2016 in Didim, Turkey.
