= Basat Öztürk =

Turkish diplomat (born 1963)

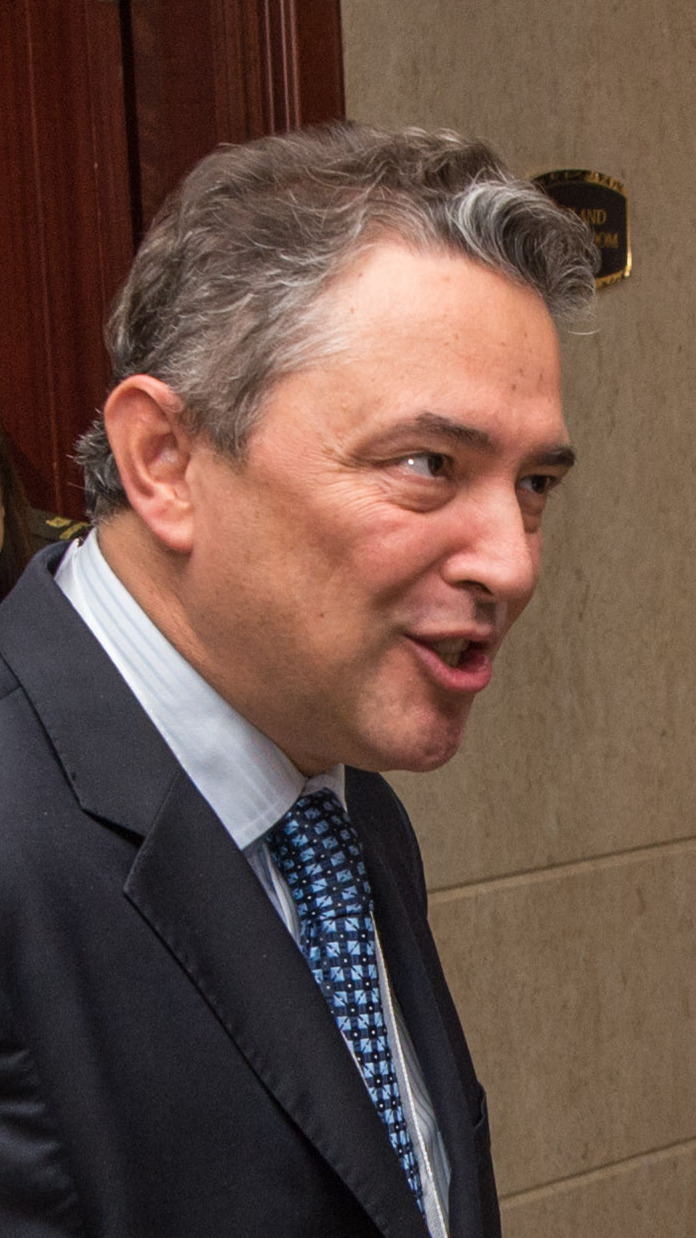
- Öztürk in June 2017

Permanent Representative of Turkey to NATO
- In office 15 November 2018 – 16 January 2023
- Preceded by: Mehmet Fatih Ceylan
- Succeeded by: Zeki Levent Gümrükçü

Personal details
- Born: Basat Öztürk; 7 December 1963 (age 62) Elazığ, Turkey

Basat Öztürk (born 7 December 1963) is a Turkish diplomat who served as the permanent representative of Turkey to NATO and as the Turkish ambassador to Afghanistan.

== Early life ==
Basat Öztürk was born in Elazığ on 7 December 1963. He graduated from Ankara University, Faculty of Political Sciences in 1985. In 1996 he enrolled into the NATO Defense College.

== Career ==
After graduating from university in 1985, he entered the Ministry of Foreign Affairs serving as the third secretary and attache in the NATO department. From 1989 and 1994 he served in the Turkish embassy in Tehran and the consulate in Chicago. He then served in the Ministry of Foreign Affairs in several NATO related positions until 2000.

Öztürk served as Consul General in Alexandria between 2002 and 2004. From 2004 he was involved with the Ministry of Foreign Affairs assuming the position as its Deputy Director-General of Maritime and Aviation from 2007 to 2009. He became an ambassador to Kabul on 19 October 2009.

On 17 November 2013, Öztürk replaced NATO Deputy Secretary General Hüseyin Diriöz, whose term of office expired in 2013. He was nominated but a German candidate was selected.

He served as General Manager of Multilateral Political Affairs from 1 December 2013 and 15 March 2015 and has been General Manager of International Security Affairs from 15 March 2015 and 16 October 2016.

On 17 October 2016, he served as the first civilian deputy undersecretary of the Ministry of National Defense until 9 July 2018. Öztürk became the Permanent Representative of Turkey to NATO on 15 November 2018.

He was replaced by his successor, Zeki Levent Gümrükçü, on 16 January 2023.

== Personal life ==
Öztürk speaks English. He is married and has two daughters.
