= Onur Öymen =

Turkish diplomat and politician (born 1940)

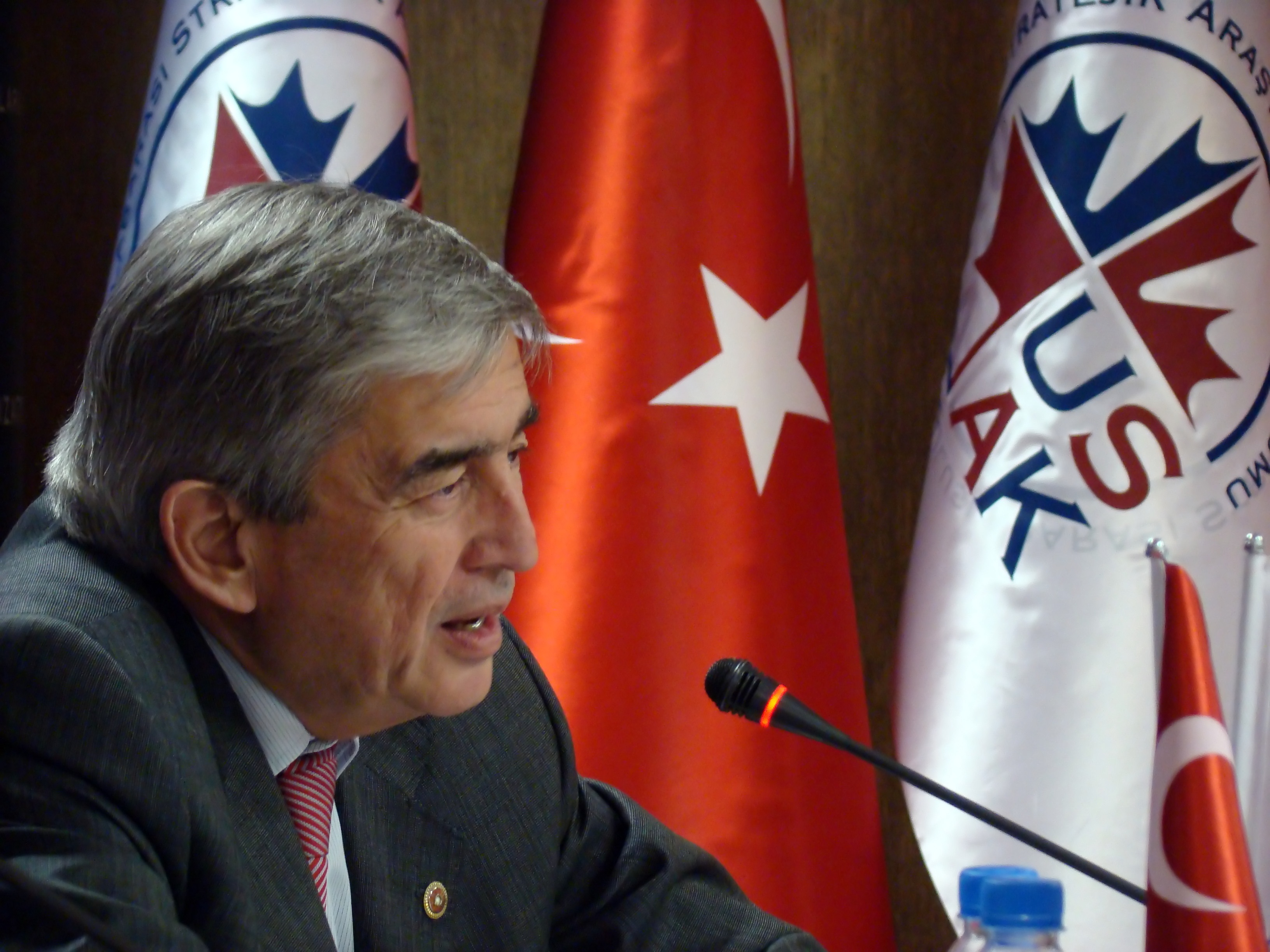
- Öymen giving a speech in 2010

Permanent Representative of Turkey to NATO
- In office 1997–2002

Ambassador of Turkey to Germany
- In office 1990–1995

Ambassador of Turkey to Denmark
- In office 1988–1990

Personal details
- Born: Başaran Onur Öymen; 18 October 1940 (age 85) Kadıköy, Istanbul, Turkey
- Children: 2
- Education: Ankara University

Onur Öymen (born 1940) is a Turkish diplomat, politician and writer. He was the ambassador of Turkey to Denmark and then to Germany. He also served as the permanent representative of Turkey to NATO. After he retired from diplomatic post in 2002 he became a member of the Republican People's Party and was its deputy chairman between 2003 and 2010. Öymen was also a member of the Turkish Parliament for two terms.

== Early life and education ==
Öymen was born in Kadıköy, Istanbul, on 18 October 1940. His parents were Münir Raşit Nuri Öymen and Nebahat Öymen. His father was the uncle of politician and journalist Altan Öymen and journalist Örsan Öymen.

Öymen graduated from Galatasaray High School and received a degree from the Faculty of Political Sciences at Ankara University in 1963. He obtained his Ph.D. from the same university, and his thesis is about technological developments and defense policies.

== Career and activities ==
After he finished his doctorate Öymen joined the Ministry of Foreign Affairs in 1964. He was the undersecretary at the Turkish Embassy in Lefkoşa, Cyprus, between 1974 and 1978. He was appointed to the same post in Prague in 1980 and in Madrid in 1982. He returned to Ankara in 1984 and held various positions at the Ministry. He was the ambassador of Turkey to Denmark between 1988 and 1990. His next diplomatic post was the ambassador of Turkey to Germany which he held between 1990 and 1995. One of the significant events occurred during this period was the murder of five Turkish people in an arson attack by the neo-Nazis in Solingen, Germany, on 28–29 May 1993. Following the incident Öymen and the German Foreign Minister Klaus Kinkel participated in a televised meeting asking Turks living in the country not to overreact, but to use democratic ways to express their anger to avoid violent demonstrations.

Öymen was named as the undersecretary at the Ministry in 1995 which he held until 1997. He visited Israel in January 1996 in regard to the role of Turkey in the Arab-Israeli peace process. He and the deputy chief of staff Çevik Bir were instrumental in improving the relations with Israel in 1996. Öymen was appointed permanent representative of Turkey to NATO in 1997 and remained in office until his retirement in 2002.

Öymen joined the Republican People's Party after his retirement from diplomatic post and was elected as a deputy from the party representing İstanbul in the general election in November 2000. He was made deputy chairman of the party on 5 November 2003 and remained in office until 23 May 2010. He was fired from the post when Kemal Kılıçdaroğlu became the president of the party succeeding Deniz Baykal in the post. Öymen was the major figure in articulating the party's European Union policy. He was elected to the Parliament in the general election held in 2007 from Bursa, and his tenure ended in 2011.

== Personal life and work ==
Öymen is married and has two children, a daughter and a son. Burak Öymen, his son, is a businessman and married Czech model Tereza Maxová in Didim in October 2016.

Öymen has published various books most of which are about foreign relations of Turkey and politics.
