= Qasim Ali Khan Mosque =

Mosque in Peshawar, Khyber Pakhtunkhwa, Pakistan

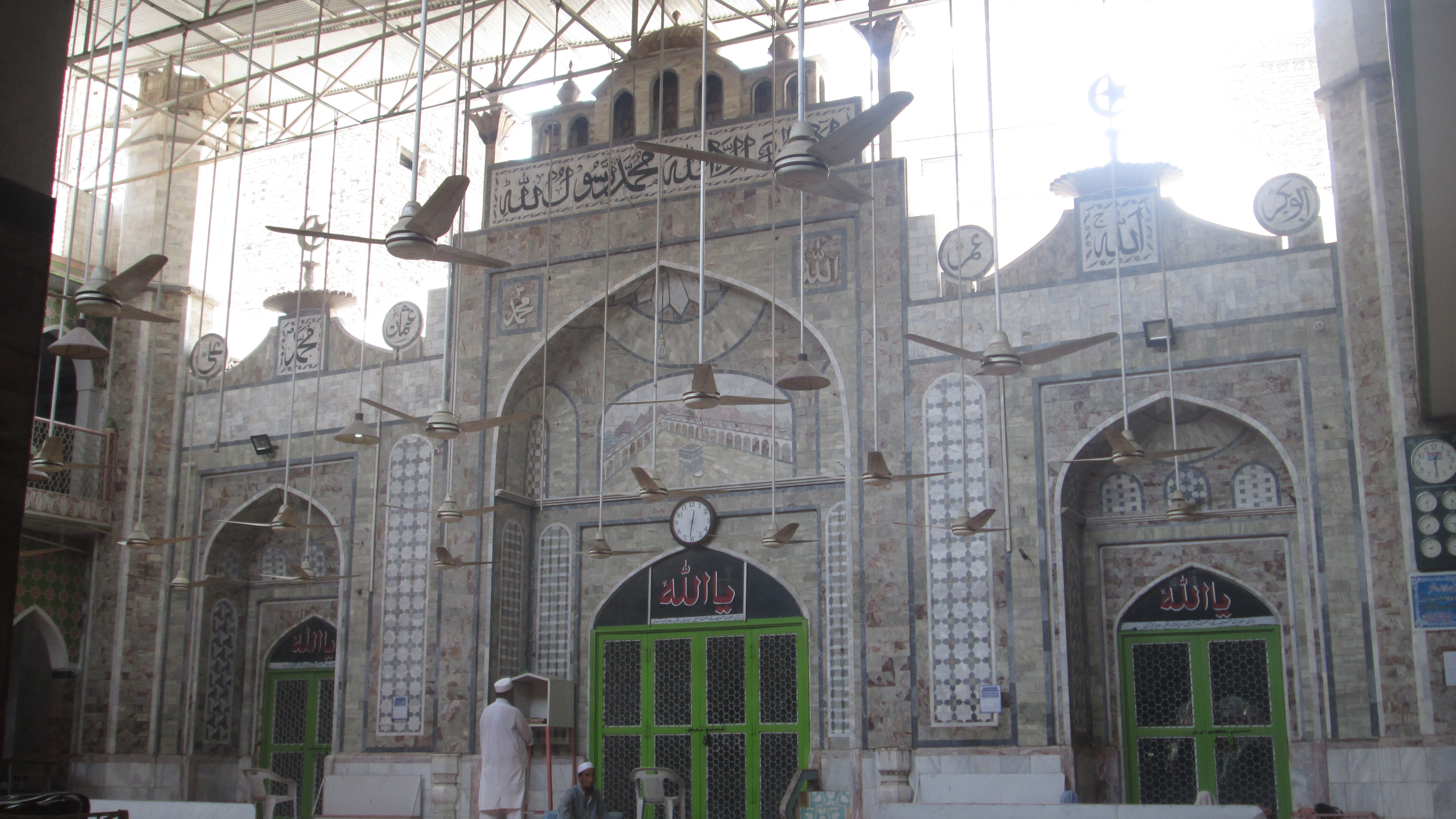

Religion
- Affiliation: Islam
- Branch/tradition: Sunni
- Leadership: Mufti Shahabuddin Popalzai (Khatib)

Location
- Municipality: Peshawar
- Country: Pakistan
- Interactive map of Qasim Ali Khan Mosque
- Coordinates: 34°0′33.77″N 71°34′16.25″E

Architecture
- Completed: 1842
- Minaret: 4

Qasim Ali Khan Mosque (Urdu, Pashto: مسجد قاسم علی خان; Hindko: قاسم علی خاں مسیت) is a historic mosque located in the Qissa Khwani Bazaar in Peshawar, Khyber Pakhtunkhwa, Pakistan.

== Origin ==
The original date of the construction of the mosque is uncertain. The legends have been passed down through generations of residents, creating a conflict amongst scholars and historians concerning the identity of the real builder. According to one version, the mosque was built during the reign of Emperor Aurangzeb (1658 to 1707) by Qasim Ali Khan, a news writer and administrator in the government of Kabul. According to another theory it was built in 1842 during the Sikh rule, and continued to be expanded until the 20th century.

== Khateeb ==
Khyber-Pakhtunkhwa's residents invariably begin and end fasting according to an announcement made by the mosque's khateeb – lately Muhammad Shahabuddin Popalzai (6th Khateeb of the Popalzai family).

Shahabuddin’s uncle Abdur Rahim Popalzai II was one of the more documented Popalzais. Born in the 1890s, he took part in the Khilafat Movement in his teens. Mufti Abdur Rahim Popalzai II published a journal by the name of Sarfaroosh and was part of the freedom movement against the British. Upon his death in 1944, his younger brother also known as Mufti, Sarhad Mufti Muhammad Abdul Qayyum Popalzai (1911–1983) took the mantle. He was also a part of various national and international movements including the freedom movement -Tahreek-e-Tahaffuz Khatm-e-Nubuwwat. He was also the companion of Ameer Shariat Syed Attaullah Shah Bukhari, Moulana Ghulam Ghous Hazarvi and Moulana Syed Gul Badshah before passing it on.
