= Embassy of Turkey, Kabul =

Embassy in Kabul, Afghanistan

Ambassador of Turkey to Afghanistan
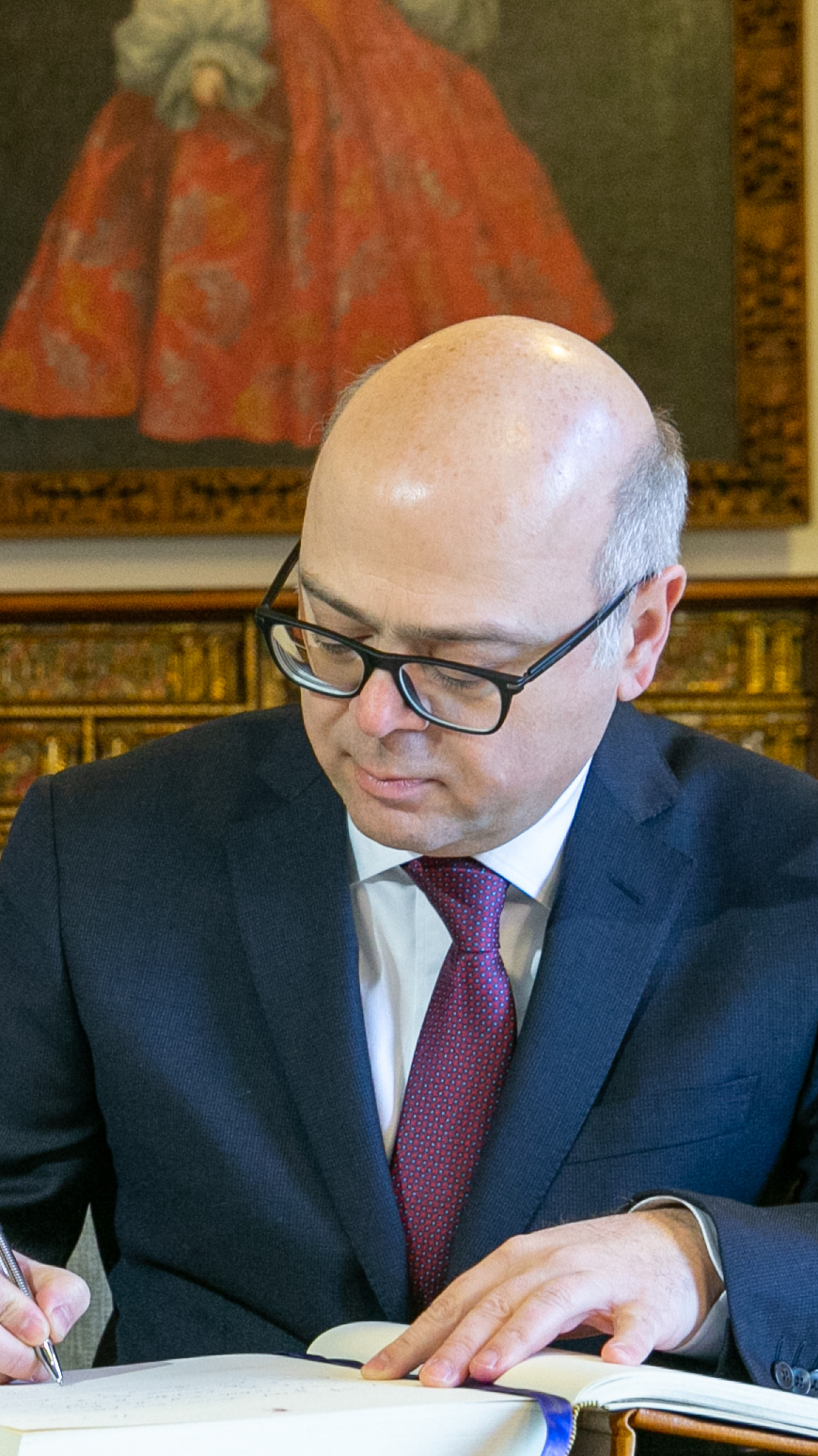
- Incumbent; Cihad Erginay since 22 May 2021
- Ministry of Foreign Affairs
- Style: Mister or Madam Ambassador (informal); His or Her Excellency (diplomatic)
- Appointer: President of Turkey
- Term length: No fixed term
- Formation: 1 August 1920
- First holder: Abdurrahman Bey (as Representative)
- Website: kabil.be.mfa.gov.tr

The Embassy of Turkey in Kabul is the diplomatic mission of the Republic of Turkey to Afghanistan, resident in Kabul. Formally, the embassy and its staff are accredited to the Islamic Republic of Afghanistan. The ambassador meets with the unrecognized Islamic Emirate of Afghanistan officials and Taliban members as they de facto the current government of Afghanistan. In March 2022, Foreign Minister Mevlüt Çavuşoğlu expressed an intention to recognise the Islamic Emirate.

The current ambassador is Cihad Erginay who presented his credentials to then President Ashraf Ghani on 22 May 2021.

== Legation ==
In August 1920, Turkey sent its first representative to Afghanistan. It was followed by the appointment of an ambassador on 26 June 1922. The land where the embassy is located was gifted to Turkey during the reign of King Amanullah Khan. The embassy, which is built on an area of 45,065 m^{2}, is the first diplomatic mission to be opened in Kabul. The deed of the embassy was issued to Turkey on 25 November 1945. The current buildings of the embassy were built in 1977.

== Organisation ==
Alongside with its usual responsibilities, the embassy operates four additional offices: military, education, trade, and a representative office of Turkey's Ministry of the Interior.
