= Pak-Turk Maarif International Schools & Colleges =

Chain of private schools in Pakistan

PakTürkMaarif
- پاک ترک معارف
- Islamabad, Lahore, Peshawar, Multan, Karachi, Khairpur, Jamshoro, Hyderabad, Quetta, Rawalpindi, Islamabad, Punjab, Sindh, Khyber Pakhtunkhwa, Balochistan; Pakistan

Information
- Type: Private Chain
- Motto: "What is Taught with Love Lasts Forever"
- Established: April 1995
- Chairman: Harun Küçükaladağlı
- Staff: PVPS
- Grades: Pre-school to A-Level/Fsc(HSSC)
- Enrollment: Approximately 13,000
- Language: English, Turkish
- Colours: Turquoise & white
- Website: pk.maarifschool.org

Pak-Türk Maarif International Schools & Colleges (BaşakşehirMaarif Uluslararası Okulları ve Kolejleri) is a chain of private international educational institutes under the umbrella of Turkish Maarif Foundation. Established in 2018, for the promotion of literacy in Pakistan, Pak-Turk Maarif has 27 branches in Islamabad, Rawalpindi, Lahore, Karachi, Khairpur, Multan, Jamshoro, Peshawar, Hyderabad and Quetta, with a total student population of more than 13000. Before 2018, the school was called Pak-Turk International Schools and was not under the umbrella of the Turkish Maarif Foundation.

== History ==
PakTurk's first educational institution, the Islamabad Boys Branch, was established in April 1995 through educational agreements issued by the Government of Pakistan's Ministries of Education and Foreign Affairs. The first Preschool and Junior Branch opened in Islamabad in April 1997, followed by the opening of a Karachi branch in August 1997. In August 1999, an Islamabad Girls Branch was opened.

A memorandum of understanding with the Economic Affairs Division (EAD) of the Government of Pakistan on 30 October 1999 placed the Pak Turk International Schools and Colleges under the auspices of the Pak Turk International Cag Educational Foundation (Pak Turk ICEF), an international Turkish non-governmental organization funded by donations from Turkish philanthropists.

In September 2000, Pak Turk ICEF opened a Quetta branch of PakTurk International Schools and Colleges, followed by a Lahore branch in September 2001. Within the framework of the Adopt-a-School Scheme initiated by the Government of Pakistan's Ministry of Education, Pak Turk ICEF adopted schools in Sindh, Balochistan, Khyber Pakhtunkhwa and Punjab. A Khairpur branch opened at Former Colonel Shah Hostel Building on 16 April 2002. April 2003 saw the opening of a Multan branch at Khanewal Road. In April 2004 a Lahore Islampura branch was opened.

In the wake of the 2005 earthquake that devastated areas of Pakistan, Pak Turk ICEF participated in humanitarian aid efforts targeting those affected by the earthquake. Collaborating with the Kimse Yok Mu Aid and Solidarity Association of Turkey, Pak Turk ICEF became the first international foundation to reach the earthquake zone a day after the disaster, hauling 40 tons of relief goods, including tents, bedding, winter clothing, and food supplies. In response to the collapse of the educational infrastructure in regions affected by the 2005 earthquake, Pak Turk ICEF—again in collaboration with the Kimse Yok Mu Aid and Solidarity Association—completed the construction of ten prefabricated school buildings that were erected on the sites of collapsed schools in Muzaffarabad, Balakot and Mansehra. The furniture, set up and equipment of these schools were flown from Turkey and were assembled in time to be inaugurated in May 2006. These schools were submitted to the jurisdiction of the educational authorities in Azad Kashmir and North-West Frontier Province.

During the second half of 2006, Pak Turk ICEF ventured into constructing school and college campuses in Islamabad, Lahore, Peshawar, and Quetta. The Islamabad, Lahore, and Peshawar campuses were scheduled to open in time for the 2007–2008 academic year, while the Quetta campus construction was scheduled to begin in the second half of 2007.

Quetta Campus started functioning in August 2009.

In August 2016, Turkish principals of 28 schools were removed from their posts and the board of directors was dissolved. The New Board of directors consisted of all Pakistani nationals. All schools were being operated under a locally registered NGO PakTurk Education Foundation.

In December 2018, the Supreme Court of Pakistan instructed the interior ministry to declare Pak-Turk International Cag Education Foundation a proscribed organization and ordered the change in management of the schools. In January 2019, Turkey's Maarif Foundation formally took the management of all 28 Pak-Turk schools in Pakistan.

== Islamabad Capital Territory Branch ==
- Islamabad Chak Shehzad Campus is a boys campus that is offering pre-school to A-levels to both resident-scholars and day-scholars.
- Islamabad H-8 Campus is a girls-only campus that is offering pre-school to A-levels to both resident-scholars and day-scholars.
- Islamabad Junior G-10 Campus is a Junior school.
- Islamabad Pre-School G-10 Campus is a pre-school.
- Pak-Turk Maarif International Schools and Colleges F-11 Branch Islamabad, Pakistan

== National Events and programs ==
=== MISMO ===
MISMO (Maarif Inter-Schools Maths Olympiad) for Class IV to VIII is a mathematics test based on multiple-choice questions. Pak-Turk International Schools and Colleges have been organizing the Maarif Inter-Schools Maths Olympiad (MISMO) for the students of private as well as state schools across Pakistan since 2005. MISMO has become a national event and is being conducted all over Pakistan. This competition is conducted in different cities simultaneously. Cash prizes along with shields and certificates are given away to the qualifying candidates. The first position holder (studying in class VIII) is awarded the title "Al-Khwarizmi of Pakistan, of the year" after the name of Al-Khwarizmi (Arabic: عَبْدَالله مُحَمَّد بِن مُوسَى اَلْخْوَارِزْمِي) (c. 780 – c. 850), a Persian Muslim mathematician, astronomer, and geographer during the Abbasid Empire, a scholar in the House of Wisdom in Baghdad.
