= Mohammad Yunus (diplomat) =

Indian diplomat (1916–2001)

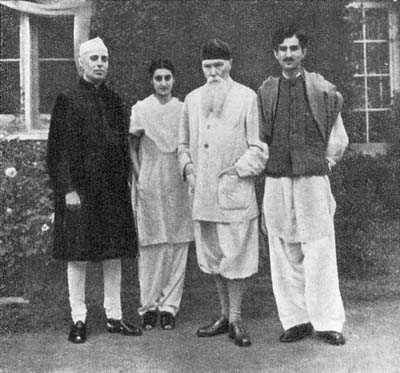
- Jawaharlal Nehru, Indira Gandhi, Nicholas Roerich, and Mohammad Yunus Khan
- Born: 26 June 1916; Peshawar, North-West Frontier Province, British India
- Died: 17 June 2001 (aged 84); New Delhi, Delhi, India
- Father: Haji Ghulam Samdani
- Awards: Padma Bhushan

Mohammad Yunus Khan (26 June 1916 – 17 June 2001) was a member of Indian Foreign Service. He served as ambassador to Turkey, Indonesia, Iraq, and Spain. He promoted trade between India and the rest of the world through regular trade fairs and the establishment of exhibition complex at Pragati Maidan in Delhi. He also headed erstwhile Trade Fair Authority of India (TFAI) which is now rebranded as India Trade Promotion Organization. The Government of India awarded him the civilian honour of the Padma Bhushan.

== Personal details ==
Yunus was born on 26 June 1916 in the city of Abbottabad, North-West Frontier Province, to Haji Ghulam Samdani and Murvari Jan. His maternal uncle was Khan Abdul Gaffar Khan and he studied at Muslim University School, Aligarh and Islamia College, Peshawar.

He died at the age of 84 on 17 June 2001 at the AIIMS, New Delhi after a protracted illness, surrounded by family and friends.

== Independence movement ==
Yunus was a follower of Khan Abdul Ghaffar Khan, with whom he worked from 1936 to August 1947 as a Khudai Khidmatgar. He was imprisoned during the Quit India Movement by Iskandar Mirza in 1941. In Abbottabad Prison he contracted tuberculosis and was subsequently released in 1944, as the government did not think he would survive. After recuperating, he was again jailed in Kashmir in 1946.

== Career ==
He joined the Indian Foreign Service in 1947 after he was appointed by the then Prime Minister, Jawaharlal Nehru, de hors the processes of public examination commenced in 1948. During his time with the IFS, he represented India at the Non-Aligned Summits at Lusaka, Algiers, Colombo, New Delhi, and Harare.

Yunus retired as Secretary to the Ministry of Commerce in 1974.

In 1975 he was appointed as special envoy of the then Prime Minister Indira Gandhi. In this capacity he established the Pragati Maidan in Delhi and went on regular trade exhibitions around the globe to promote Indian products and companies.

He was nominated to the Rajya Sabha in June 1989.

== Adil Shahryar ==
Yunus's son, Adil Shahryar, was a childhood friend of Rajiv Gandhi and his brother, Sanjay Gandhi. It is alleged that Rajiv Gandhi secured his release through a presidential pardon from Ronald Reagan from a U.S. prison in the aftermath of the Bhopal disaster as a quid pro quo for releasing Warren Anderson from Indian custody at that time. Adil Shahryar was serving a 35-year federal prison sentence for drug trafficking, wire fraud, and firearms violations.

Except for the time his name was allegedly involved in the Fairfax Affair during the VP Singh regime, which concerned an alleged bribe to an American investigative agency to keep Rajiv Gandhi's name out of its findings from IRS investigations of graft, Adil Shahryar lived a quiet life thereafter and died in 1990.

== Literary works ==
The first book written by Yunus was titled Frontier Speakers, with a foreword by Jawaharlal Nehru and a preface by Khan Abdul Ghaffar Khan. It was banned by the British government in 1942. He then wrote "Kaidi ke Khat", in Urdu, later translated into English and Hindi, and finally his memoirs, Persons, Passions and Politics published in November 1979.

== See also ==
- Aligarh Muslim University
- Syed Akbaruddin
