= Cihad Erginay =

Turkish diplomat

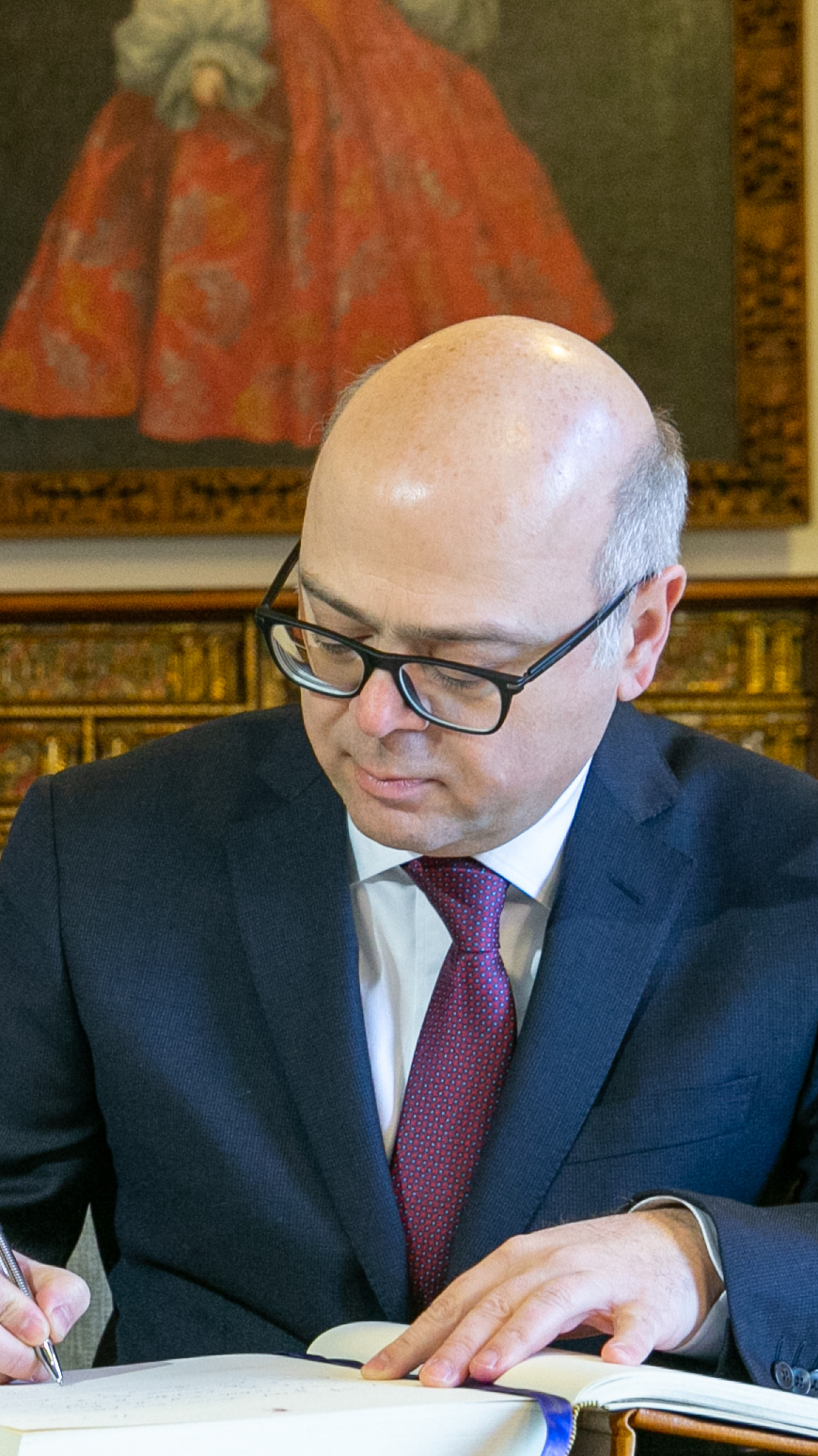
- Erginay in 2020

Ambassador of Turkey to Afghanistan
- Incumbent
- Assumed office 22 May 2021

Personal details
- Born: September 24, 1966 (age 59) Ankara, Turkey
- Education: Middle East Technical University

Cihad Erginay (born 24 September 1966) is a Turkish diplomat and current ambassador of Turkey to Afghanistan since 22 May 2021.

== Education and career ==
Erginay graduated from Middle East Technical University with a bachelor's degree in International Relations. He joined the Turkish Ministry of Foreign Affairs in 1988 and served as the Turkish ambassador to Czech Republic, Bosnia and Herzegovina, Spain and Afghanistan at different times of his career. He is currently director general for South Asia in MFA.
