= Cinnah Caddesi =

Road in Ankara, Turkey

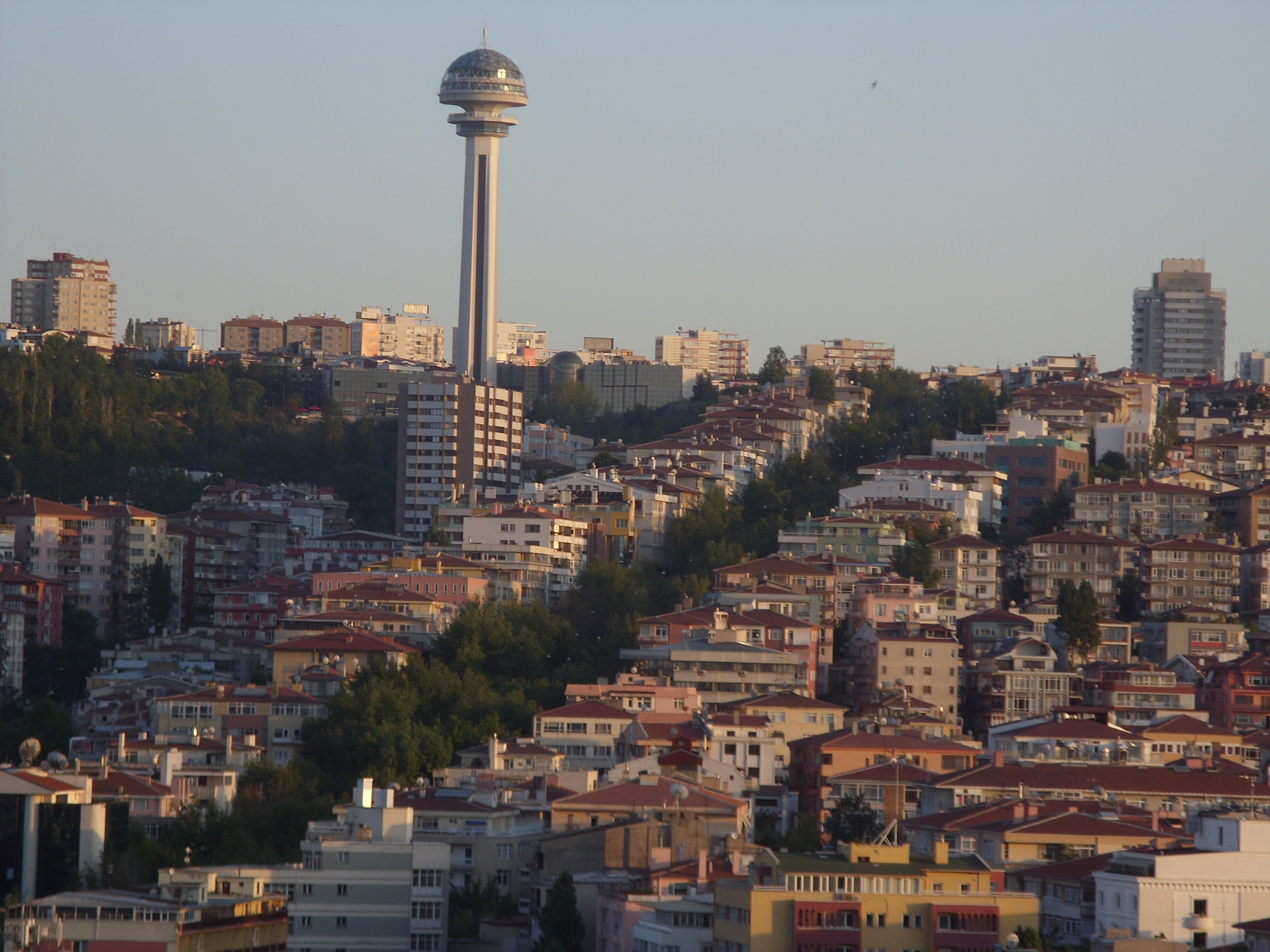
View of the Cinnah Caddesi and Atakule

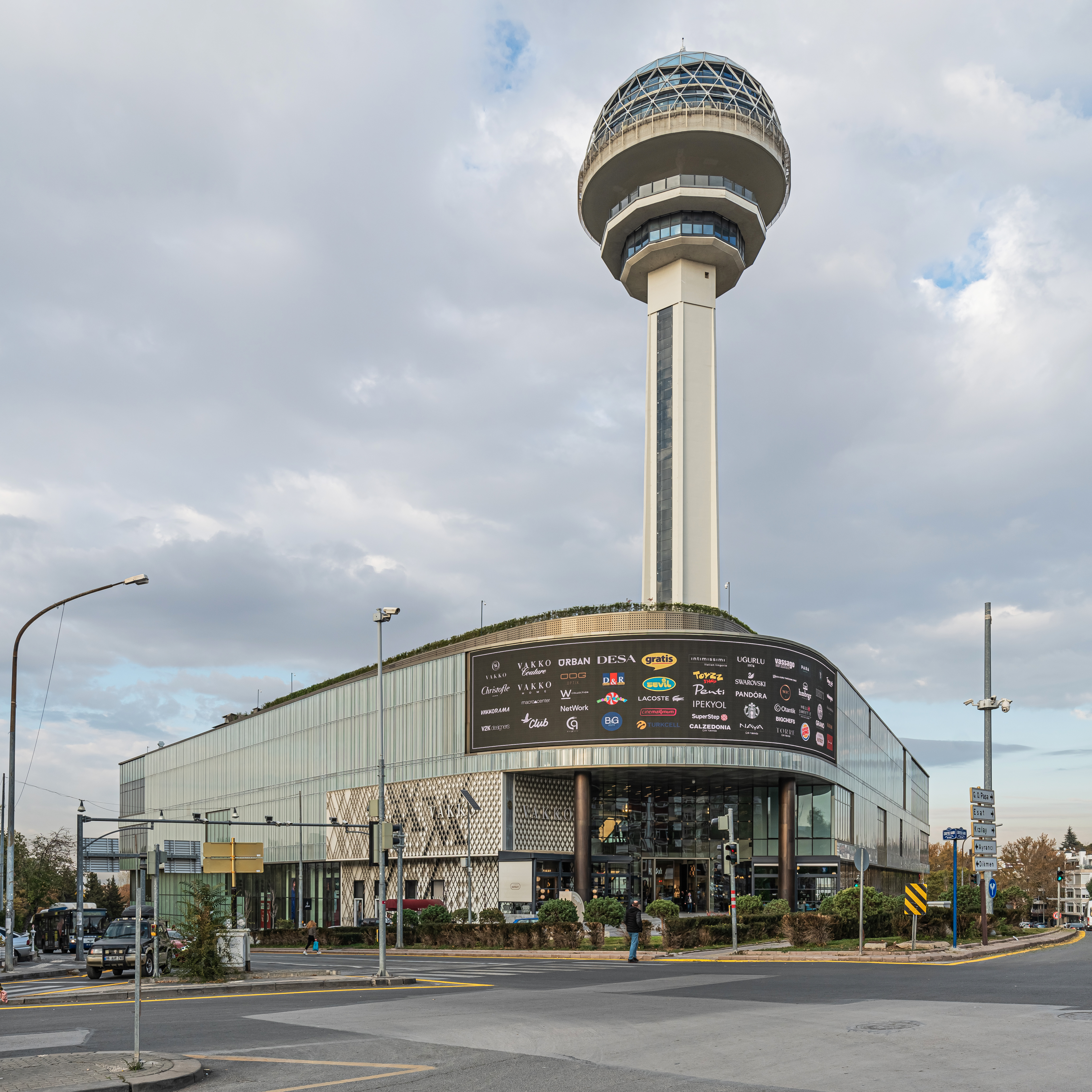
The upper entrance of the Cinnah Caddesi and Atakule

The Cinnah Caddesi (transl. 'Jinnah Road') is a major road located in the city of Ankara, the capital of Turkey. It is one of the most important arteries of traffic and commerce in the city. It is named after the founder of Pakistan, Muhammad Ali Jinnah.

== Importance ==
The Cinnah Caddesi is a large road that is located in an important commercial and political district of the Turkish capital, Ankara. Planned and constructed as an all-weather, concrete road with multiple lanes, its course is surrounded by high-rise buildings, residential complexes and public places such as parks and other large roads. Many smaller roads and lanes connect traffic with it. Offices of many important banks, corporations, commercial shops and other private institutions are located in buildings on either side of the road. Also based along the road are government offices and embassies of foreign nations, including India, Afghanistan and Canada. There are several residential buildings along its route, which are high-priced owing to their location in the heart of the city.

== Status ==
The road has suffered from chronic traffic congestion and inclement weather, as well as its topographical steepness. The steepness of the road was fixed on early 1990s, mayorship era of Mehmet Altınsoy, therefore created few underpasses such as Farabi and Kuloğlu. As of July 28, 2006 Cinnah Caddesi was transformed into a one-way road with an aim of reducing congestion. This change has caused major alterations in traffic patterns and transportation across Ankara.

== See also ==
- CENTO

== Sources ==
- Jinnah, Fatima (1987). My Brother. http://www.fatimajinnah.gov.pk/Books/_intro.htm%5B%5D Quaid-i-Azam Academy. ISBN 969-413-036-0
- Some details in Turkish
