= Turkey's membership of international organizations =

A darker shade indicates a higher level of integration of European countries in international organisations

An Euler diagram showing the relationships between various multinational European organisations and agreements

A clickable Euler diagram showing the relationships between various Asian regional organizations

Turkey is a founding member of the United Nations, the Organisation of the Islamic Conference (now the Organisation of Islamic Cooperation), the Organisation for Economic Co-operation and Development and the Organization for Security and Co-operation in Europe, has been in the Council of Europe since 1949, and in NATO since 1952. Since 2005, Turkey is in accession negotiations with the European Union, having been an associate member since 1963 and is also in European Customs Union. Turkey is also a member of the G20 industrial nations which brings together the 20 largest economies of the world.

Turkey entered NATO in 1952 and serves as the organization's vital eastern anchor, controlling the straits leading from the Black Sea to the Mediterranean and sharing a border with Syria, Iraq, and Iran. A NATO headquarters is located in İzmir, and the United States has maintained air forces at a Turkish base called Incirlik that is located near the Mediterranean city of Adana.

Turkey is also member of the World Trade Organization (WTO). It has signed free trade agreements with the European Free Trade Association (EFTA), Israel, the United Kingdom and many other countries. In 1992, Turkey and 10 other regional nations formed the Black Sea Economic Cooperation Business Council to expand regional trade and economic cooperation.

In December 2000 Turkey became an observer state of the Association of Caribbean States (ACS). In 2017 ASEAN-Turkey Sectoral Dialogue Partnership was recognized by the 50th ASEAN Foreign Ministers' Meeting in Manila, Philippines.

== List of international organizations ==
- ASEAN (Sectoral Dialogue Partner)
- ACD
- ADB
- AfDB
- Amnesty International
- Australia Group
- BIPM
- BIS
- Black Sea Naval Force
- BSEC
- CE
- CEN
- CERN (associate member)
- CICA
- Community of Portuguese Language Countries (observer)
- Developing-8
- EAPC
- EBRD
- ECE
- EFTU
- EUMETSAT
- EUROCONTROL
- European Forest Institute
- European Political Community
- European Union (candidate) (Note: see also Ankara Agreement)
- FATF
- G20
- G33
- IAEA
- IBRD
- ICAO
- ICC
- ICRM
- ICSID
- IDA
- International Energy Agency
- IEA
- IEC
- IFAD
- IFC
- IFRCS
- IHO
- ILO
- IMF
- IMO
- IMSO
- IOC
- IOC
- IOM
- IRENA
- ISO
- ITSO
- ITU
- ITUC
- International Federation of Red Cross and Red Crescent Societies
- Inmarsat
- Interpol
- Intergovernmental Organisation for International Carriage by Rail
- MIKTA
- NATO
- NEA
- NSG
- OECD
- OIC
- OPCW
- OSCE
- Paris Club — associate member
- PCA
- TAKM
- TRACECA
- Turkic Council
- TURKPA
- TÜRKSOY
- UfM
- UIC
- UN
- UNCTAD
- UNEP
- UNESCO
- UNHCR
- UNIDO
- UNIFIL
- UNIKOM
- UNITAR
- UNMIBH
- UNMIK
- UPU
- WCO
- WFP
- WHO
- WIPO
- WMO
- WTrO
- World Turks Qurultai
- Zangger Committee

== See also ==
- Foreign relations of Turkey
- Free-trade agreements of Turkey
- Turkey–United States relations
- Turkey–United Kingdom relations
- Turkey–European Union relations
- Turkey in NATO
- Russia–Turkey relations
- European integration
- Ministry of Foreign Affairs of Turkey
- List of Turkish diplomats
- Turkish diplomatic missions
- Politics of Turkey
- Republic of Turkey
- Ottoman Empire
- List of European countries by membership in international organisations
- Membership of Northern Cyprus in international organizations
