= Free trade agreements of Turkey =

Turkey Free trade agreements Turkey Agreement in force Agreement signed, but not applied Agreement being negotiated Former agreements

This page lists the free trade agreements signed by Turkey. In 1995, Turkey signed a customs union with the European Union for goods, excluding agricultural products and services. As of 2018, EU has been Turkey's main trade partner with 50% of its exports and 36% of its imports.

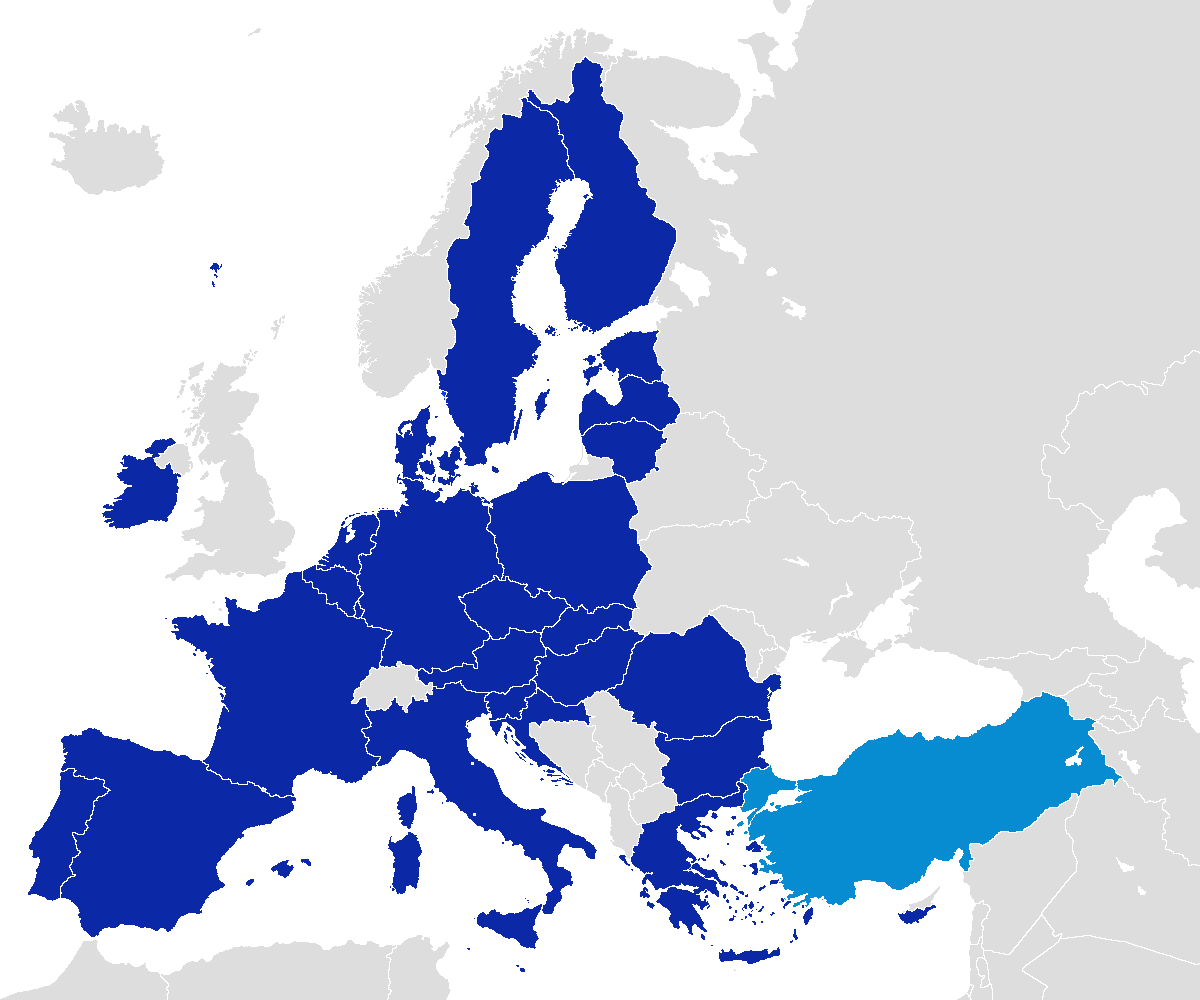
Turkey – European Union Customs Union (EUCU)

== List of agreements ==
=== Signed ===
State	Signed	In Force	Notes
European Free Trade Association (EFTA)	10 December 1991	1 September 1992	Free Trade Agreement
European Free Trade Association (EFTA)	25 June 2018	1 October 2021	Updated FTA including services
European Union	6 March 1995	31 December 1995	Customs Union, included the United Kingdom until its withdrawal in 2020.
Albania	22 December 2006	1 May 2008	Free Trade Agreement
Azerbaijan	25 February 2020	Under ratification	Free Trade Agreement
Bosnia-Herzegovina	3 July 2002	1 July 2003	Free Trade Agreement
Bosnia-Herzegovina	2 May 2019	1 August 2021	Revised FTA
Chile	14 July 2009	1 March 2011	Free Trade Agreement
Egypt	27 December 2005	1 March 2007	Free Trade Agreement
Faroe Islands	16 December 2014	1 October 2017	Free Trade Agreement
Georgia	21 November 2007	1 November 2008	Free Trade Agreement
Israel	14 March 1996	1 May 1997	Free Trade Agreement, effectively halted since 3 May 2024.
Kosovo	27 September 2013	1 September 2019	Free Trade Agreement
Lebanon	24 November 2010	Under ratification	Free Trade Agreement
Malaysia	17 April 2014	1 August 2015	Free Trade Agreement
Mauritius	9 September 2011	1 June 2013	Free Trade Agreement
Moldova	11 September 2014	1 November 2016	Free Trade Agreement
Montenegro	26 November 2008	1 March 2010	Free Trade Agreement
Morocco	7 April 2004	1 January 2006	Free Trade Agreement
North Macedonia	7 September 1999	1 September 2000	Free Trade Agreement
Palestine	20 July 2004	1 June 2005	Free Trade Agreement
Serbia	1 June 2009	1 September 2010	Free Trade Agreement
Serbia	30 January 2018	1 June 2019	Updated FTA including services
Singapore	14 November 2015	1 October 2017	Free Trade Agreement
South Korea	1 August 2012	1 May 2013	Free Trade Agreement
South Korea	26 February 2015	1 August 2018	Updated FTA including services
Sudan	24 December 2017	Under ratification	Free Trade Agreement
Tunisia	25 November 2004	1 July 2005	Free Trade Agreement
Ukraine	3 February 2022	Ratified (2026)	Free Trade Agreement
United Arab Emirates	3 March 2023	1 September 2023	Comprehensive Economic Partnership Agreement
United Kingdom	29 December 2020	1 May 2021	Free Trade Agreement, prior to this agreement, Turkey-UK had customs union as part of EU-Turkey customs union between 1995-2020.
Venezuela	17 May 2018	21 August 2020	Trade Development Agreement

=== Unilateral agreements ===
According to EU-Turkey Customs Union signed in 1995, third countries that sign a free trade agreement with the EU can have unilateral free trade with Turkey.

=== Future ===
The following list contains the countries with active trade agreement negotiations.

State	Notes
Canada	Free Trade Agreement
Colombia	Free Trade Agreement
Democratic Republic of Congo	Free Trade Agreement
Djibouti	Free Trade Agreement
Ecuador	Free Trade Agreement
Ghana	Free Trade Agreement
Gulf Cooperation Council	Free Trade Agreement
Indonesia	Indonesia–Turkey relations
Japan	Japan–Turkey relations
Mexico	Mexico–Turkey relations
Pakistan	Pakistan–Turkey Free Trade Agreement
Peru	Free Trade Agreement
Qatar	Qatar–Turkey relations
Thailand	Free Trade Agreement
United Kingdom	Turkey–United Kingdom Free Trade Agreement
United States	Turkey–United States relations, Halted in October 2019
Euro-Mediterranean free trade area	Free Trade Agreement
Economic Cooperation Organization Trade Agreement	Free Trade Agreement

=== Replaced agreements with EUCU ===
The following agreements have been replaced with European Union–Turkey Customs Union:

State	Signed	In Force	Ended	Notes
Bulgaria	07 November 1998	1 January 1999	31 December 2006	Free Trade Agreement
Croatia	13 March 2002	1 July 2003	30 June 2013	Free Trade Agreement
Czech Republic	10 March 1997	1 September 1998	30 April 2004	Free Trade Agreement
Estonia	06 March 1997	1 July 1998	30 April 2004	Free Trade Agreement
Hungary	01 August 1997	1 April 1998	30 April 2004	Free Trade Agreement
Latvia	16 June 1998	1 July 2000	30 April 2004	Free Trade Agreement
Lithuania	06 February 1997	1 March 1998	30 April 2004	Free Trade Agreement
Poland	4 October 1999	1 May 2000	30 April 2004	Free Trade Agreement
Romania	29 April 1997	1 February 1998	31 December 2006	Free Trade Agreement
Slovakia	20 October 1997	1 September 1998	30 April 2004	Free Trade Agreement
Slovenia	05 May 1998	1 June 2000	30 April 2004	Free Trade Agreement

=== Former ===
State	Signed	In Force	Ended	Notes
Syria	22 December 2004	1 January 2007	6 December 2011	Free Trade Agreement, suspended after Syrian Civil War
Jordan	1 December 2009	1 March 2011	22 November 2018	Free Trade Agreement, repealed by Jordan
