= Turkey–United Kingdom Free Trade Agreement =

Proposed free trade agreement between Turkey and the United Kingdom

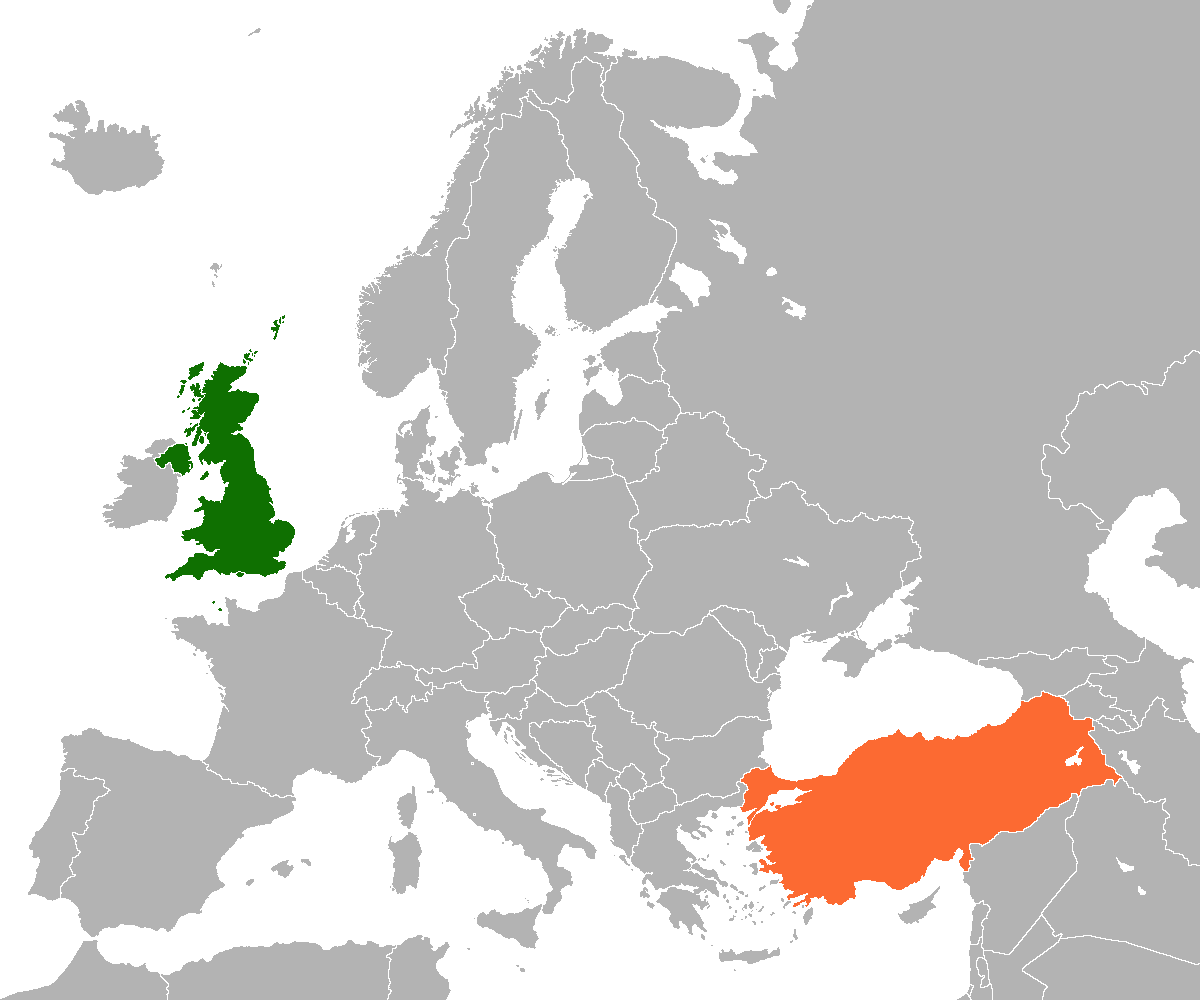
- Turkey United Kingdom
- Type: Free trade agreement and economic integration agreement
- Context: Trade agreement between Turkey and the United Kingdom
- Negotiators: (Turkey) Turkish Trade Ministers: Ömer Bolat; (United Kingdom) British Trade Ministers: Kemi Badenoch (until 5 July 2024); Jonathan Reynolds (until 5 September 2025); Peter Kyle (until 20 July 2026); Jonathan Reynolds (from 20 July 2026)
- Parties: Turkey; United Kingdom
- Language: English; Turkish

The Turkey–United Kingdom free trade agreement (TUKFTA) is a proposed free trade agreement which began negotiations on 14 March 2024. The trade agreement will be the third FTA to cover Turkey–UK trade, and will supersede the currently active Turkey–UK Trade Agreement, extending the deal to cover services and digital trade.

== History ==
From 31 December 1995 until 30 December 2020, trade between Turkey and the United Kingdom was governed by the European Union–Turkey Customs Union, while the UK was a member of the European Union. Following the withdrawal of the United Kingdom from the European Union, the UK and Turkey signed a continuity trade agreement on 29 December 2020, based on the EU free trade agreement; the agreement entered into force on 1 January 2021.

Trade Agreement History between Turkey and the United Kingdom

Parties	Agreement	Signed	Effective	Obsolete	Coverage	WTO	Note
European Economic Community; Turkey	European Economic Community–Turkey Additional Protocol	23 November 1970	1 January 1973	1 January 1974	Goods	Free Trade Agreement	The agreement extended the Ankara Agreement to the United Kingdom.
European Economic Community; Turkey	European Economic Community–Turkey Association Agreement	30 June 1973	1 January 1974	1 January 1996	Goods	Free Trade Agreement	The agreement extended the trade agreement coverage between the European Economic Community and Turkey.
European Union; Turkey	European Economic Community–Turkey Customs Union	6 March 1995	1 January 1996	1 January 2021	Goods	Customs Union	The agreement created a bilateral customs union between the European Union and Turkey.
Turkey; United Kingdom	Turkey–UK Trade Agreement	29 December 2020	1 January 2021	Active	Goods	Free Trade Agreement	Following Brexit, Turkey and the United Kingdom signed a trade continuity agreement to replicate the terms of the EU–Turkey Customs Union until an enhanced bilateral FTA could be negotiated.

== Negotiations ==
Turkey–UK FTA Round of Negotiations
Round	Dates	Location	Ref.
1	23 June–2 July 2025	Ankara	
2	15–19 September 2025	London	
3	17–21 November 2025	Ankara	
4	23–27 February 2026	London	
5	15–23 June 2026	Ankara	
6	28 September–2 October 2026	London	

On 18 July 2023, Turkey and the United Kingdom announced their intentions start talks on a modernised free trade agreement; the agreement will supersede the goods-only Turkey–United Kingdom Trade Continuity agreement. The UK opened up a trade consultation from 2 November 2023 and close on the 5 January 2024. Trade negotiations formally opened on 14 March 2024. The practical negotiations are scheduled for after the UK general election on 4 July.

The first round of negotiations included discussions covered sustainability and collaboration, including women’s economic empowerment and labour rights, as well as the regulatory environments of both countries; talks were also held on trade in services, focusing on digital, financial, and professional business services.

The second round of negotiations included discussions on digital trade, financial and professional services, and investment, while both sides also advanced talks on goods market access, environmental and labour standards, anti-corruption provisions, dispute settlement, and intellectual property, with productive initial discussions on trade remedies and regulatory practices helping to define future areas of cooperation and strengthen the basis for an updated trade agreement.

== See also ==
- Economy of Turkey
- Economy of the United Kingdom
- European Union–Turkey Customs Union
- Free trade agreements of Turkey
- Free trade agreements of the United Kingdom
- Foreign relations of Turkey
- Foreign relations of the United Kingdom
- Turkey–United Kingdom relations
