= Staatsexamen Nederlands als tweede taal =

Dutch language proficiency test

Staatsexamen Nederlands als tweede taal (State Exams Dutch as a Second Language or State Examination of Dutch as a Second Language), often abbreviated as Staatsexamen NT2, is a standardised examination of Dutch language for those who are not native speakers of Dutch. By passing the State Examinations NT2 candidates can show that they have sufficient command of the Dutch language to be able to work or study in the Netherlands.

== Organiser ==
The Staatsexamen NT2 is organised by Dienst Uitvoering Onderwijs (DUO) (Office of Education) on behalf of the College voor Examens (CvE) (Board of Examinations). CvE is nonetheless still responsible for the organisation, development of the State Examinations NT2, and provision of sample papers.

The actual execution of the examination is done by Cito, a testing and measurement company with international reputation, and Bureau ICE. While Cito is responsible for the listening and speaking exam, Bureau ICE is responsible for the reading and writing exam. Therefore, Cito also provides further training for markers for the speaking exam and facilitates the entire process of grading for this part of the exam.

== Level of examinations ==
As different levels of language competence are needed for working and for studying, there are two levels of examination, which could be chosen by the candidates. Programme 1 should be taken by candidates who need to work or be under vocational training in a Dutch environment. Programme 2 certifies that the candidates who pass the test have mastered enough Dutch for employment or education in college or university. These exams are set according to the Common European Framework of Reference (CEFR), where Programme 1 corresponds to the B1 level and Programme 2 corresponds to the B2 level.

== Structure ==
The examination consists of four sections: reading, listening, writing and speaking. A candidate gets the Diploma NT2, only if they pass all four parts.

Candidates complete the listening and speaking tests on a computer, and finish the writing tests partly on the computer and partly on an answer sheet. For the reading test, the reading texts would be printed on a booklet and the candidates should mark their answers on the computer.

== Registration ==
The exam is registered through the website of DUO. The exam could be taken at Amsterdam, Eindhoven, Delft, Rotterdam, Utrecht and Zwolle almost every week.

== Preparation ==
Sample papers for the exam are available. Candidates may also decide to enroll in preparation courses offered by various language schools.

== Results ==
The result for the exam is marked either as "Satisfactory" or "Not satisfactory". The result is announced about five weeks after the exam.

== Recognition ==
A pass in Programme 2 can fulfil the language requirement for enrollment in college or university in the Netherlands. According to the Dutch nationality law and Integration law for immigrants to the Netherlands, a pass in Programme 1 can exempt candidates from taking the language test in the process of immigration and naturalisation.

== See also ==
- CNaVT
