= Interuniversitaire Taaltest Nederlands voor Anderstaligen =

The Interuniversitaire Taaltest Nederlands voor Anderstaligen (English: Interuniversity Test of Dutch as a Foreign Language) is a standardised Dutch-language examination for non-native speakers of Dutch. It is the Flemish counterpart of NT2 Staatsexamen, and is consequently only offered in Belgium, in Brussels, Ghent, Antwerp and Leuven.

== Format ==
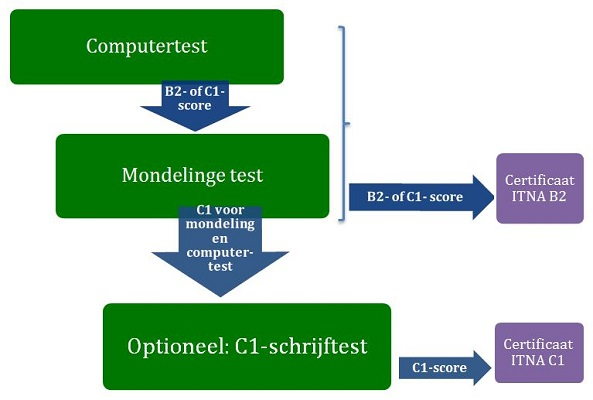
Flowchart showing the tests in the ITNA for B2 and C1 levels

Students first take a computer-administered test, covering aspects such as reading, grammar, vocabulary and listening, at CEFR B2 level. If they pass this, they then take the oral component of the test. If this is also passed, they are certified as having passed at CEFR B2 level.

If a candidate scores at least "good" (around 66%) on each of the four components of the B2 test (use in language, reading, listening and speaking), and "very good" overall (at least 77.81%), they can optionally take a CEFR C1 writing task (within a year of taking the initial exams). If they pass that test (with a minimum score of 50%), they are certified as having passed at CEFR C1 level.

Spell-checkers (in Microsoft Word) are allowed only in the C1 test, and the test can be taken either in the AZERTY keyboard layout used in Belgium, or the QWERTY layout used in the Netherlands.

== Resits ==
The B2-level exams can be taken at most four times per year. The C1-level exam can also be taken at most four times every year (with the clock starting after passing the B2 test). The C1-level exam can only be taken at the same test centre where the B2-level exams were passed.

There must be a 14-day gap between resits.

== Usage ==
The test is mostly used by Dutch-speaking universities in Belgium, with a pass at B2 level required to enroll in most courses taught in Dutch.
