= CKI =

CKI may refer to

- Cheung Kong Infrastructure Holdings
- Circle K International
- Cook Islands, UNDP code
- Croker Island Airport, IATA airport code
- Cikini railway station, a railway station in Jakarta, Indonesia
- Cyclin-dependent kinase inhibitor protein
- Crusader Kings, the first installment in Paradox Interactive's Crusader Kings video game series
- Centraal Krediet Informatiesysteem (Central Credit Information System), Dutch credit record of BKR (credit bureau)
