= CNaVT =

Dutch language test

CNaVT, or Certificaat Nederlands als Vreemde Taal (Certificate of Dutch as Foreign Language), is an internationally recognised certificate proving the language ability in Dutch language of the holders. To obtain the certificate, Dutch learners must pass the CNaVT examination, organised by the Catholic University of Leuven and Radboud University Nijmegen. The Dutch Language Union has commissioned this collaboration. CNaVT is also a member of the Association of Language Testers in Europe (ALTE). The examinations is set according to different levels in the Common European Framework of Reference for Languages and is offered in accordance to various needs of the examinees. The certificate is widely recognised as proof of ability in Dutch in the Netherlands and Belgium and is useful for immigration, work and admission to educational institutions.

From 2026, the exam will be a computer-based test, but will continue to be taken in test centres.

== Organisation ==
The CNaVT examination is organised by CNaVT, a government-subsidised non-profit organisation affiliated with the Catholic University of Leuven in Belgium and Radboud University in Nijmegen, the Netherlands. CNaVT operates under the auspices of the Dutch Language Union, which aims at strengthening the international status of the Dutch language by creating an infrastructure for a joint language policy, and by integrating the Dutch speaking people in the Netherlands with the Dutch speaking (Flemish) community in Belgium. Within this framework, CNaVT designs and develops this proficiency tests, develops and maintains a database of tests and test tasks for use by teachers teaching Dutch as a foreign language, and conducts research to provide these tests with a scientific basis.

The Centre for Language and Education of the Catholic University of Leuven is responsible for managing and implementing the CNaVT project. From 2010 until 2015, there was a cooperation agreement with Fontys University of Applied Sciences to implement the project. Since 2020, the Catholic University of Leuven collaborates with Radboud University Nijmegen.

== Examination ==
The examination takes place once every year in May and registration normally ends by mid-March. Candidates can take the exam in their home country, usually with help from Dutch teachers there. The current recommended registration fee is 75 euros.

== Various profile exams and levels ==
As people learn Dutch for various reasons, the CNaVT developed different profile exams and has adopted the current format since 2003. Different profile exams prove that the holder has mastered enough Dutch to be able to use it in different contexts. The various profile exams correspond to different levels in the Common European Framework of Reference for Languages (CEFR).

Profile Exams	CEFR Level	Target group
Maatschappelijk Informeel (INFO)	A2	This exam is for those who have Dutch-speaking relatives or friends, or those who would like to speak Dutch as a tourist in Dutch speaking areas, or those who would like to communicate with Dutch-speaking tourists in their homeland.
Maatschappelijk Formeel (FORM)	B1	This exam is for those who are interested in Dutch language and culture, or those who would like to reside in the Netherlands or Belgium for an extended period of time.
Zakelijk Professioneel (PROF)	B2	This exam is for those who work in the administrative or service-oriented sectors with the need of speaking Dutch (e.g. as a secretary or bank employee).
Educatief Startbekwaam (STRT)	B2	This exam is for those who want to enroll in a Dutch-speaking college, higher education institute or university.
Educatief Professioneel (EDUP)	C1	This exam is for those who have neared completion of their education in Dutch as a foreign language, or for those who aspire to teach Dutch as a foreign language. It is also for those who work in a Dutch-speaking academic environment, e.g. as a researcher.

The former names of these exams are provided below (there is no direct equivalent to PTPB, which has been discontinued).

Profile Exams	CEFR Level
Profile tourist and informal language proficiency (PTIT)	A2
Profiel Taalvaardigheid Praktische Beroepen (PTPB)	A2
Profile societal language proficiency (PMT)	B1
Profile professional language proficiency (PPT)	B2
Profile language proficiency higher education (Educatief Startbekwaam — formerly PTHO)	B2
Profile academic and professional language proficiency (Educatief Professioneel — formerly PAT)	C1

== Format ==
The exam consists of three parts. In part A listening ability is tested and examinees need to complete tasks based on different audio fragments. In part B reading and writing proficiency is tested. Part C tests examinees' ability in oral communication. Parts A and B are tested in a classroom setting while in Part C the examiner and the candidate have a one-on-one conversation.

Candidates may use a dictionary in Part A (listening) and Part B (writing), but not in Part C (oral).

Profile Exams	Listening	Writing	Oral	Approximate duration
PTIT	17 minutes	1 hour 15 minutes	16 minutes	2 hours
PMT	56 minutes	1 hour 40 minutes	12 minutes	2 hours 50 minutes
PPT	1 hour	1 hour 40 minutes	16 minutes	3 hours
Educatief Startbekwaam (former PTHO)	1 hour 15 minutes	1 hour 55 minutes	20 minutes	3 hours 30 minutes
Educatief Professioneel (former PAT)	1 hour 25 minutes	1 hour 45 minutes	20 minutes	3 hours 30 minutes

== CNaVT and ALTE ==
The CNaVT has been a member institute of the Association of Language Testers in Europe (ALTE) since 1996 and exchanges expertise with other members in the area of language examination.

== Enrollment ==
Although enrolment varies, on average more than 2000 candidates take the examination every year.

Number of enrolment worldwide
	2006	2007	2008	2009	2010	2011	2012	2013
Candidates	2,470	2,062	2,416	2,303	2,602	2,737	2,519	2,400
Institutions						208	197	206
Countries						38	44	47

== Results ==
The exam papers are sent to the Catholic University of Leuven and Radboud University Nijmegen for marking, and results are announced in July. Candidates who have passed receive a certificate.

The passing rate varies in different profile exams.

Profile Exams	CEFR Level	Passing rate in 2012
PTIT	A2	93.5%
PMT	B1	76%
PPT	B2	85%
PTHO (now "Educatief Startbekwaam")	B2	62%
PAT (now "Educatief Professioneel")	C1	39%

== Recognition ==
Those who have passed PMT, PPT, Educatief Startbekwaam or Educatief Professioneel are exempted from the language tests of the integration exams, i.e. "Inburgeringsexamen or Naturalisatietoets" for immigration to the Netherlands. But the parts concerning the immigrants' knowledge of the Netherlands ("Kennis van de Nederlandse Samenleving or KNS") cannot be exempted.

In Flanders (Belgium) and the Netherlands, in many universities and colleges, foreign students who have obtained the Educatief Startbekwaam or Educatief Professioneel certificates (and former PTHO and PAT certificates) are regarded as already fulfilled the language requirement for registration. In Flanders, in the area of education, a diploma from a recognised institution by the CNaVT can be presented as a proof of a sufficient level of language to work in the sector.

== See also ==
- Staatsexamen Nederlands als tweede taal
