= Turks in Mexico =

Ethnic group in Mexico

Total population
- 461 Turkey-born residents (2019); Unknown number of Mexicans of Turkish descent

Regions with significant populations
- Mexico City

Languages
- Spanish (Mexican Spanish), Turkish

Religion
- Predominantly Islam and Judaism

Related ethnic groups
- Turkish diaspora

Turks in Mexico (Turkish: Meksika Türkleri, Spanish: turcos mexicanos) comprise Turkish people living in Mexico and their Mexico-born descendants. The Turkish community is largely made up of immigrants or the descendants of immigrants, born in the Ottoman Empire before 1923, in the Republic of Turkey since then or in neighbouring countries once part of the Ottoman Empire that still have some Turkish population.

== History ==
According to census records, "Turks" have been present in Mexico since at least 1895 with 453 individuals recorded. However, most of the emigres from the Ottoman Empire were not ethnic Turks. Since they traveled with passports issued by Turkish authorities, it led to a misunderstanding in Latin America of identifying Arab immigrants as "turcos" (Turks). Most of the Ottoman immigrants were Lebanese Christians, with smaller populations of Syrians and Jews.

== Institutions ==
- Casa Turca Ciudad de México (2003) and Casa Turca Guadalajara (2015)

== See also ==
- Mexico–Turkey relations
