= BKR (credit bureau) =

Dutch credit bureau (1965-)

BKR, based in Tiel, is a private Dutch credit bureau. It was founded in 1965 as Bureau Krediet Registratie (Credit Registration Bureau) and maintains an electronic file for every person with a loan in the Netherlands in the Centraal Krediet Informatiesysteem (CKI, Central Credit Information System). This includes concluded credit agreements, such as loans and credit cards.

== Background and history ==
While borrowing was still taboo in the 1950s , it became more commonplace in the 1960s. Dutch banks and financial service providers saw the number of unpaid debts rise and established BKR in 1965. Its purpose was and still is to provide information to assess the creditworthiness of people applying for a loan. Before BKR began operating, institutions gathered information from the family and friends of those applying for a loan.

The BKR does not itself assess whether a person is eligible for a loan. A payment arrears on an existing loan can be a reason for the lender to deny a new loan to that person, to prevent over-indebtedness. The BKR protects financial institutions from borrowers who cannot repay their loans and believes it contributes to preventing a social problem by protecting consumers from over-indebtedness. According to the BKR, one in six Dutch families experienced financial difficulties in 2017.

In 2017, approximately 11 million consumers had registered loans of €250 or more, including arrears. In 2006, that number was just under 10 million. The BKR (Credit Registration Office) retains loan records for five years after expiration. Mortgage loans are not registered unless the borrower has defaulted on their payments for more than three months. In 2006, this period was longer: 120 days, approximately four months.

The Tiel office employs approximately 100 people. Approximately 863 affiliated institutions are represented. Every institution with a banking license is legally required to be affiliated with the BKR. However, not only banks are affiliated, but also mail-order companies and leasing companies . As of May 1, 2017, new mobile phones priced over €250 that are provided in monthly installments with a phone plan will be registered.

Lenders are legally required to perform a BKR assessment before granting a loan. This happens more than 10 million times a year. BKR charges affiliated institutions a fee for each assessment. BKR is a nonprofit organization.

Consumers can also request their data from BKR themselves. Initially, they had to pay for this. When the GDPR's right of access came into effect, BKR allowed consumers to request their data once a year for free, with a delay of up to 28 days. While paying customers receive immediate access. In 2020, BKR received a record fine from the Dutch Data Protection Authority for this practice.

=== Data collected ===
Loans with a minimum term of three months, granted to a natural person (including, for example, sole proprietorships) , and falling between a certain lower and upper limit are registered. The registered credit data are:

- The amount of the credit
- The moment the credit arose
- The expected last repayment month
- The actual last repayment month
- The type of credit
- Any special details regarding the repayment of the loan

In addition to the credit data, the register contains the following personal data:

- Surname
- Initials
- Date of birth
- Address
- Place of residence

== Arrears ==
Organizations affiliated with the BKR (Credit Registration Office) are required to report payment arrears on agreements to the BKR. They are obligated to warn consumers that the arrears will be reported to the BKR if they delay payment. The timing of this report depends on the type of agreement. The period between the time the payment arrears arise and the time it is reported to the BKR varies from two to four months. For mortgages, this period is three months. Officially, reporting arrears is called an "Arrears Notification." This is indicated in the consumer's data with an "A" next to the relevant loan. Arrears are always recorded, regardless of the amount.

If the consumer has cleared the arrears, this will also be visible at the BKR (Credit Registration Office). An "H" for Recovery is indicated on the relevant agreement. The "H" is only displayed if the agreement is ongoing. If the consumer has cleared the arrears and thus terminated the agreement, an end date is added to the agreement. The "A" for Arrears, along with the end date, remains visible on the relevant agreement. Five years after the end date, the information about the terminated agreement automatically disappears from the file, including the "A."

Negative BKR register codes
BKR code	Description
A	Arrears notification: a arrears notification has been given on a loan by the lender.
H	Recovery: a loan with arrears notification (code A) will be assigned code H as soon as the payment arrears have been settled.
1	there is a registered payment arrears for which an arrangement has now been made for the outstanding loan.
2	The outstanding portion of the loan has been declared due and payable. This means the loan has been handed over to a debt collection agency.
3	two hundred and fifty euros or more has been written off the debt.
4	the person who took out the loan is unreachable for the lender.
5	A preventative payment arrangement has been made for a mortgage. This code is temporary.

Creditors affiliated with the BKR are required to notify consumers in advance that they will file a late payment report with the BKR if payment is not made by a certain deadline. For BKR codes 1, 2, 3, and 4, the creditor is not required to provide advance notice of their BKR report.

Every loan remains listed in the CKI for five years after it has been repaid. Several banks have a rule that a consumer may not have more than six entries in the BKR (Credit Registration Office) to be eligible for financing. An overdraft, a credit card, or an installment purchase also result in a listing.

It's possible that a consumer switches banks, and the BKR registration of an already repaid revolving credit facility remains. Therefore, it's wise to request the BKR registration when switching banks.

Items like income, rent arrears, tax debt, or unpaid energy bills are not registered. Student grants from Dienst Uitvoering Onderwijs are also not registered by BKR.

Citizens can challenge their negative BKR registration. This requires that the debts have been paid off and the finances have been in order for a long period of time. This challenge can be made through the lender that recorded the BKR registration, a company specializing in BKR registration removal, or through the complaints committee Kifid. Lenders have four weeks to respond to a petition. If urgency is required, citizens can request a court to order changes more quickly.

== Inspection ==
Citizens can request access to their file and, if necessary, submit a request to their lender to have it corrected. They can also inquire which institutions have requested their file in the past twelve months. If it turns out that the file was wrongly requested, a fine will be imposed on the institution in question. A rejected loan is often the reason for a consumer to request access. More than 100,000 consumers request their own data each year. Access is free and can be requested – on paper or online. This is due to the introduction of the GDPR. Access is available via the BKR website.

The CKI doesn't contain data that clearly indicate a person's monthly loan repayment capacity; at most, it provides a possible indication. Furthermore, things like mortgages, rent arrears, energy company debts, and other payment arrears are not included in the BKR's Central Credit Information System. There were plans to record such data to better fulfill the BKR's original purpose—preventing over-indebtedness—but this proved to be in violation of privacy legislation.
