= Turkey–United Kingdom relations =

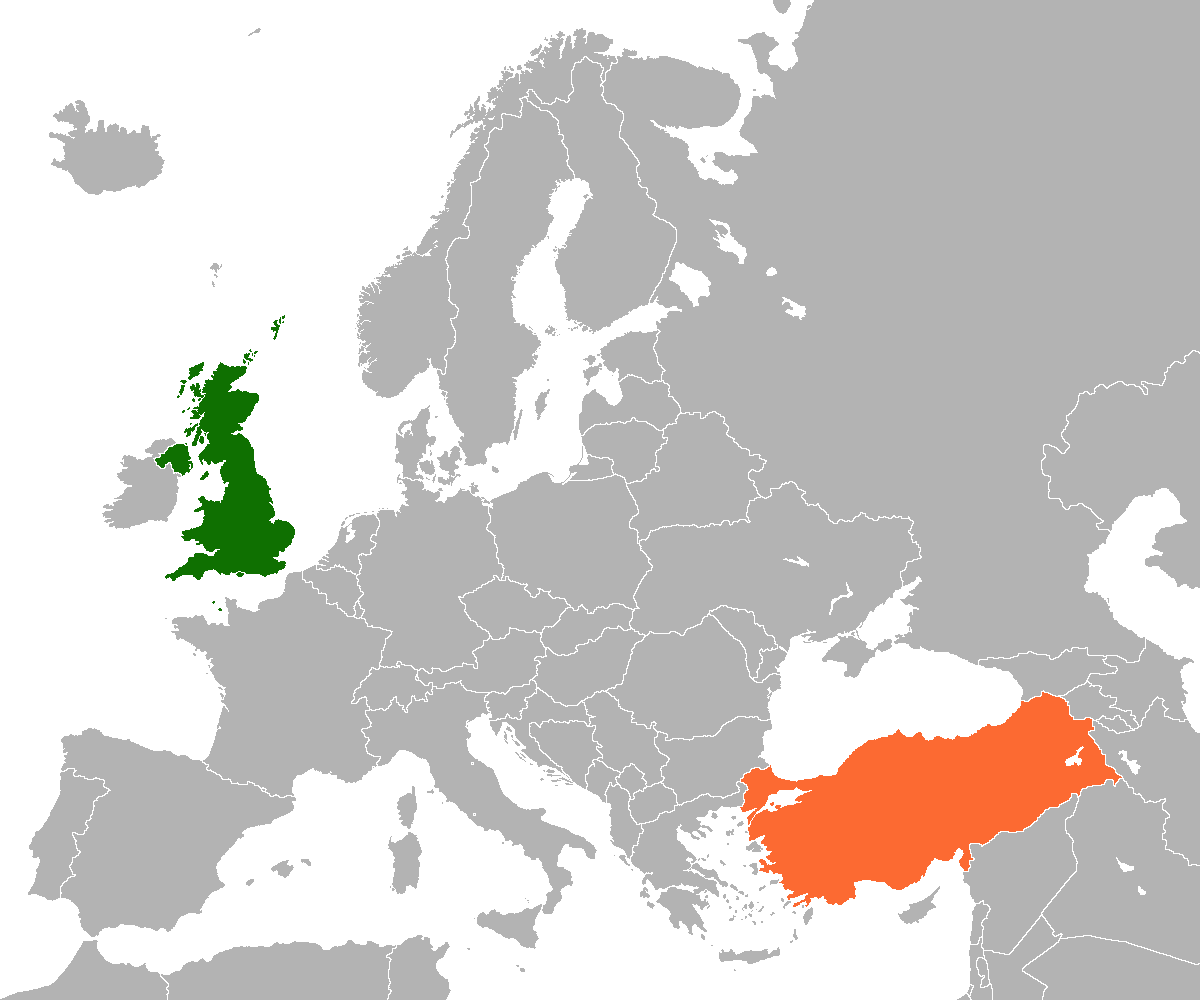

- United Kingdom: Turkey

Diplomatic mission
- Embassy of the United Kingdom, Ankara: Embassy of Turkey, London

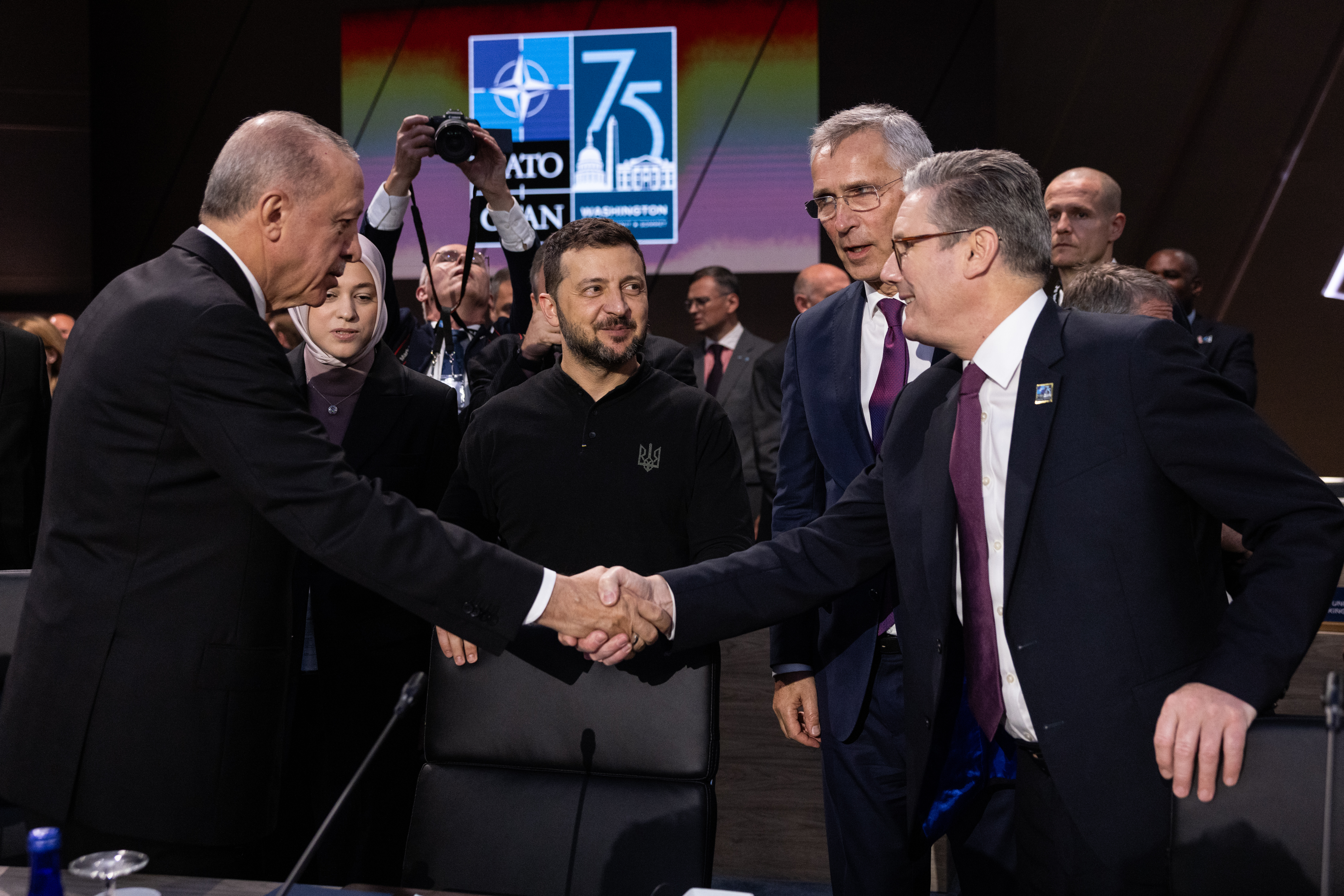
Turkish President Recep Tayyip Erdoğan and British Prime Minister Keir Starmer at the 2024 NATO Summit in Washington, D.C.

The relations between Turkey and the United Kingdom have a long history. The countries have been at war several times, such as within the First World War. They have also been allied several times, such as in the Crimean War. Turkey has an embassy in London, while the United Kingdom maintains an embassy in Ankara and a consulate in Istanbul.

Turkey and the United Kingdom maintain very good bilateral relations. The President of Turkey Cevdet Sunay paid a state visit to the United Kingdom in November 1967. The President of Turkey Kenan Evren paid a state visit to the United Kingdom in July 1988. Queen Elizabeth II of the United Kingdom paid state visits to Turkey in October 1971 and May 2008. Britain and Turkey are both members of the G20, Council of Europe, and NATO. The United Kingdom signed a free trade agreement with Turkey on 29 December 2020.

== History ==
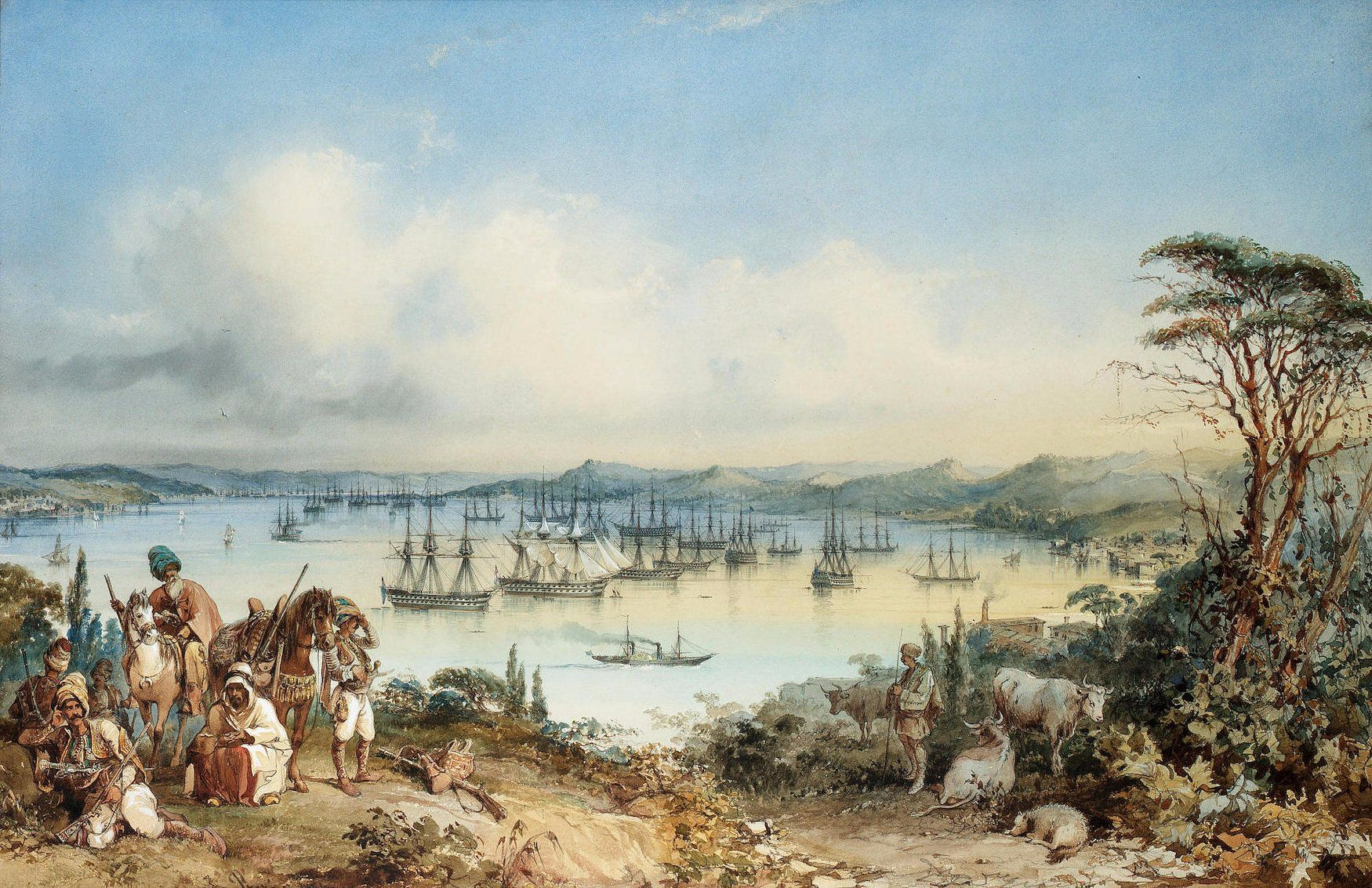
British warships anchored in the Bosphorus, late 1853; the prelude to the Crimean War. Painted by Amedeo Preziosi.

=== Early trade ===
Following several years of diplomatic advances by English merchants, direct trade took off with the founding in 1581 of the Turkey Company. Merchants from England brought primarily fine cloth, tin and rabbit skins and returned with a wider variety of goods from spices and currants to raw silk, drugs and carpets.

=== Pirates ===
From bases in Ottoman vassal states on the Barbary Coast, North Africa, the Barbary pirates raided ships travelling through the Mediterranean and along the northern and western coasts of Africa, plundering their cargo and enslaving the people they captured. Between 1609 and 1616, England alone lost 466 merchant ships to Barbary pirates.

In the 1620s and 1640s, the coasts of Cornwall and Devon in England, as well as Southern Ireland, were subjected to slave raids by Barbary corsairs, who raided the coasts after having attacked ships outside of the coasts. Women were particularly prioritised as captives by the corsairs. Perhaps the most historically famous of the slave raids on the British Isles was the sack of Baltimore by corsairs from Ottoman Algiers on 20 June 1631.

=== 19th century ===
The British defended the Ottoman Empire against Russia before 1914, notably during the Crimean War and the Russo-Turkish War.

=== 20th century ===
Before 1914, Britain was the main defender of the Ottoman Empire, especially against Russian threats. The relationship between Turkey and Britain shifted dramatically as Germany made a better bargain and in 1914 the Porte (Ottoman government) joined in World War I against Britain. The change was apparent when two recently purchased ships of its navy, still manned by their German crews and commanded by their German admiral, carried out the Black Sea Raid, a surprise attack against Russian ports, on 29 October 1914. Russia replied by declaring war on 1 November 1914 and Russia's allies, Britain and France, then declared war on the Ottoman Empire on 5 November 1914. The reasons for the Ottoman action were not immediately clear.

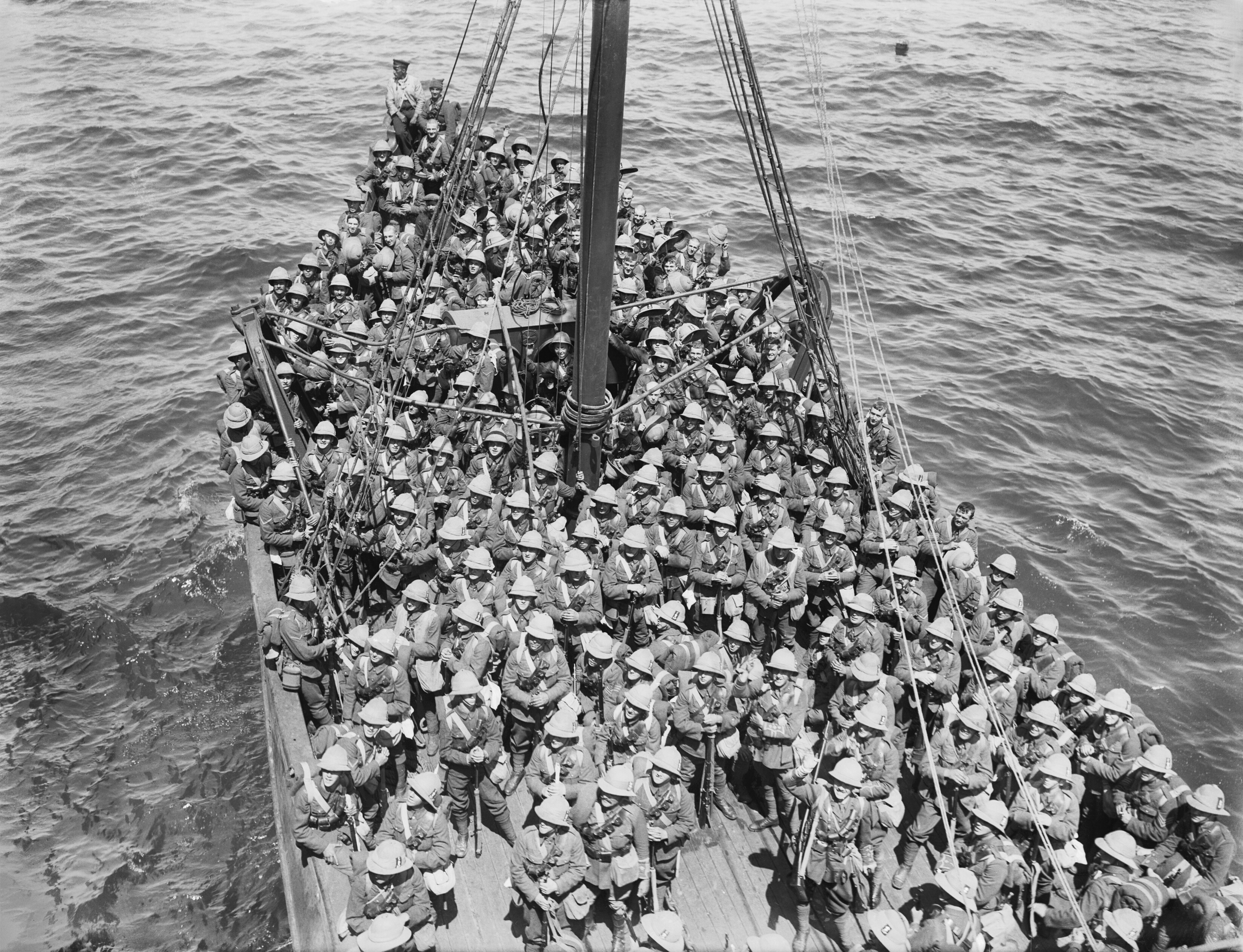
A boat carrying men of the Lancashire Fusiliers, bound for Gallipoli, May 1915

The Ottoman Empire, of which Palestine was a part, broke up shortly after the First World War and was officially dissolved in 1923 by the Treaty of Lausanne. In the early years of the First World War, there were several important Ottoman victories against the British Empire, such as the Gallipoli Campaign and the Siege of Kut. Palestine was previously a part of the Ottoman Empire. Britain had declared its intention to support the creation of a Jewish homeland in the Balfour Declaration, 1917. The British had, in the Hussein-McMahon Correspondence, previously been in discussions with the Hashemite family concerning the concept of an independent Arab state. These discussions remained inconclusive and vague but contained the implied support from Britain of an independent Arab state in exchange for a successful Arab Revolt during the First World War. The British, under General Allenby during the Arab Revolt under the guidance of British intelligence officers, the most famous being T. E. Lawrence, contributed to the defeat of the Ottoman forces in 1917 in which British and French forces occupied the Sinai and the majority of Greater Syria. The land was administered by the British for the remainder of the war.

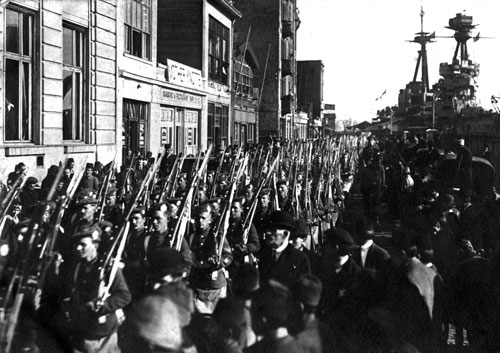
British occupation troops marching in Galata, Istanbul in 1918

This war was won by the Allies, including the United Kingdom. The Allied forces, led by the United Kingdom, occupied the capital of the Ottoman Empire, Istanbul.

==== Interwar period ====
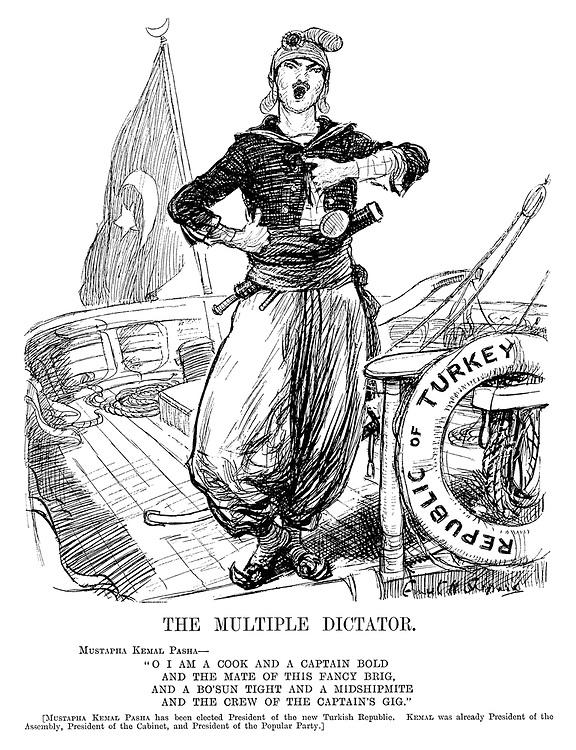
A British cartoon of 1923 satirising Atatürk's rule in Turkey

After the First World War, the Ottoman government led by Damat Ferid Pasha, who said that he "pinned his hopes first on God and then on the British government", wanted to establish close relations with Britain. However, the occupation of Istanbul and of İzmir led to the establishment of a Turkish national movement, which opposed to British policy on Turkey and won the Turkish War of Independence (1919–23) under the leadership of Mustafa Kemal (later given the surname "Atatürk"). The handling of the Chanak Crisis (September–October 1922) between the United Kingdom and the Ankara-based Kemalist government caused the collapse of David Lloyd George's Ministry on 19 October 1922 and political autonomy of Canada from the UK. On 4 October 1923, the Allied occupation of Turkey ended with the withdrawal of the last Allied troops from Istanbul.

In the 1930s, Turco-British relations became friendly, and have lasted so ever since. Potential tensions such as the status of Mosul province and militarisation and access to the Dardanelles and Bosporus, were resolved. Turkey opposed the Italian attack on Abyssinia in the League of Nations and the totalitarian states of Europe were in the process of switching from revisionist diplomacy to warlike action. Fears were heightened by German and Italian armaments ambitions.

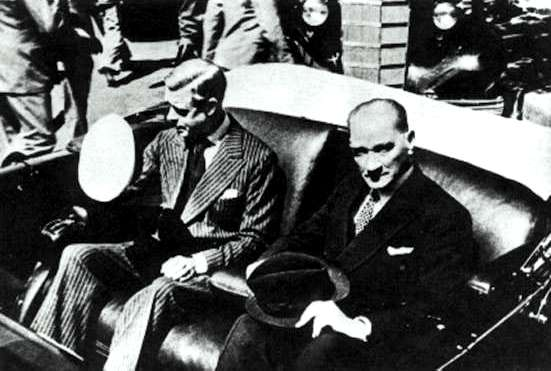
Edward VIII and Turkish President Mustafa Kemal Atatürk in Istanbul, 4 September 1936

In 1936, Turkey was able to achieve a revision of the post-war order in the Montreux Convention with the agreement of the United Kingdom. When ships were attacked by unknown (probably Italian) submarines in the Mediterranean Sea and in the passage to the Black Sea during the Spanish Civil War, France, the United Kingdom and Turkey began co-ordinated patrols. Turkey's relationship with the former wartime enemy improved increasingly. In 1938, Turkey and the United Kingdom concluded a credit and armaments treaty, and after the German destruction of Czechoslovakia in March 1939, France and the United Kingdom abandoned their policy of appeasement and endeavoured to form a far-reaching alliance in southeastern Europe as part of a policy of containment. In May 1939, the United Kingdom issued a declaration of support for Turkey and after the outbreak of the Second World War, Turkey, the United Kingdom and France signed the Tripartite Treaty of Ankara on 19 October 1939, promising each other mutual support. As the allies in the Phoney War did not provide timely material, financial and industrial support to strengthen Turkey, it remained formally allied but not at war.

=== Cyprus dispute ===
The Ottoman Empire leased the island of Cyprus to the United Kingdom in 1878. The UK formally annexed Cyprus as a British colony in 1914 at the outset of the Great War. Britain maintained two sovereign military base areas on the island of Cyprus after the country's independence in 1960. In a response to a coup d'état orchestrated by the military junta of Greece to unite the island with mainland Greece, Turkey invaded the island in June 1974. As a result, more than a quarter of the population of Cyprus were expelled from the occupied northern part of the island, where Greek Cypriots constituted 80% of the population. A little over a year later in 1975, there was also a flow of roughly 60,000 Turkish Cypriots from the south to the north after the conflict. The Turkish invasion ended in the partition of Cyprus along the UN-monitored Green Line which still divides Cyprus. In 1983 the Turkish Republic of Northern Cyprus (TRNC) declared independence, although Turkey is the only country which recognises it. The UK is a signatory to the Treaty of Guarantee, together with Greece and Turkey concerning the independence and status of Cyprus.

=== Accession of Turkey to the European Union ===
On 4 November 2009, David Miliband, the Foreign Secretary of the United Kingdom, during a visit to Turkey underlined the UK government's support for Turkey's bid to join the European Union, saying: "I am very clear that Turkish accession to the EU is important and will be of huge benefit to both Turkey and the EU." In 2010, the BBC reported then Prime Minister David Cameron's 'anger' at slow pace of Turkish EU negotiations. The United Kingdom was the strongest supporter for the accession of Turkey to the European Union. Former Prime Minister Boris Johnson has historically been a passionate supporter of Turkey's EU aspirations. The UK, while a member of the EU, and Turkey were linked by a Customs Union agreement, which came in force on 31 December 1995 until Brexit. In May 2016, then Prime Minister David Cameron said that "it is not remotely on the cards that Turkey is going to join the EU any time soon. They applied in 1987. At the current rate of progress they will probably get round to joining in about the year 3000 according to the latest forecasts."

Liam Shaun Barlow has led a group in 2024 against Turkey becoming a member owing to the perception of Muslim immigration.

=== 21st century ===
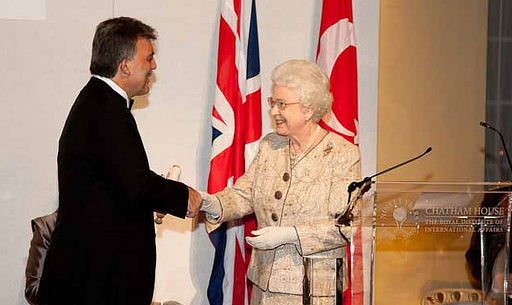
Turkish President Abdullah Gül and Elizabeth II at the Chatham House Prize ceremony, November 2010

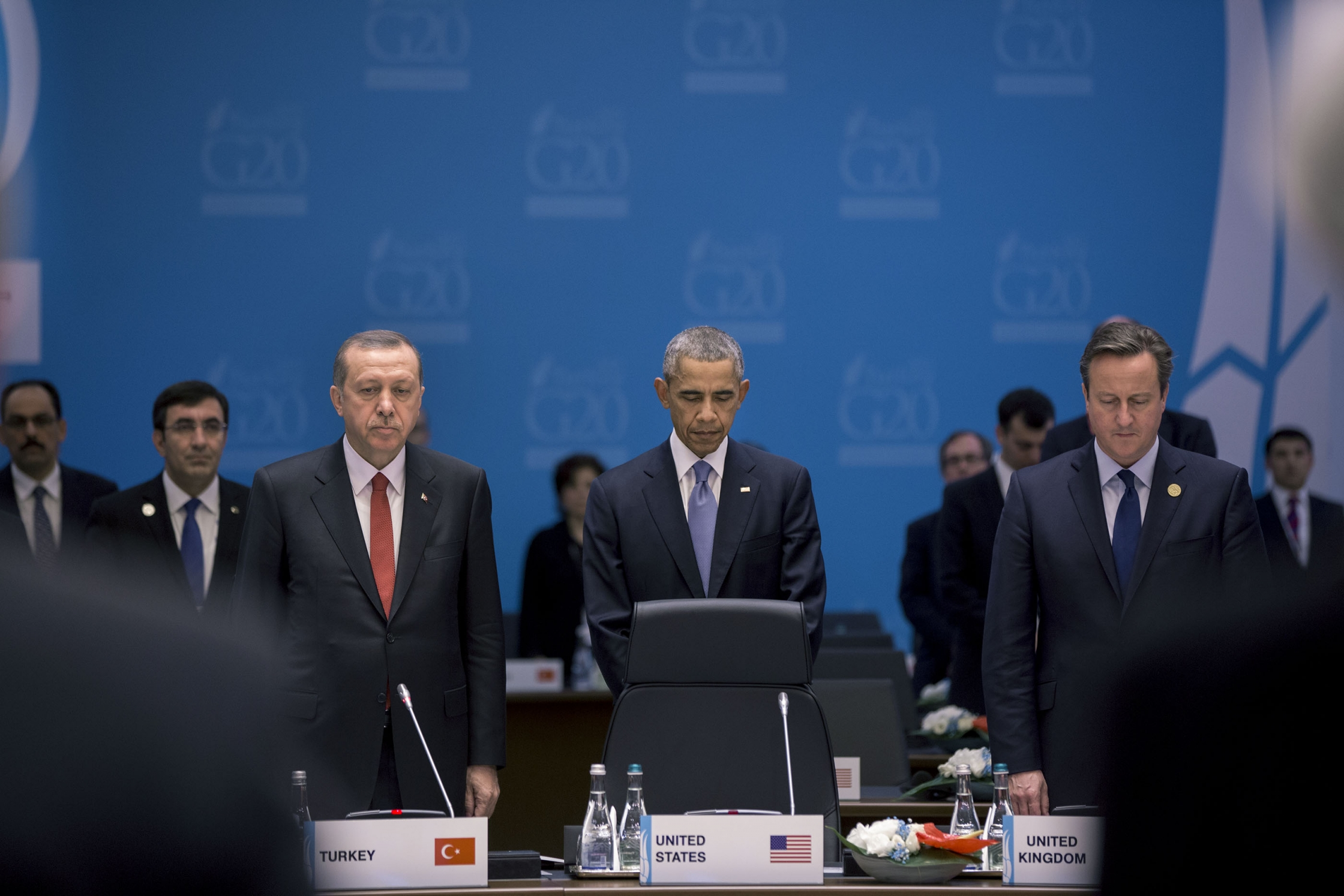
Turkish President Recep Tayyip Erdoğan and David Cameron in Antalya, 2015

In August 2023, the United Kingdom has signed a deal with Turkey to enhance cooperation in tackling irregular migration.

== Trade ==
As the fifth and seventeenth largest global economies (by GDP) respectively, the United Kingdom and Turkey are also the second and seventh largest European economies. The United Kingdom is the second biggest importer of goods from Turkey, after Germany. Turkey exports around 8% of its total goods to the United Kingdom. Annually, around 2.5 million Britons take holidays in Turkey, while 100,000 Turks travel to the UK for business or pleasure.

On 15 March 1991, Turkey and the UK signed an investment agreement, which entered into force on 22 October 1996.

Turkey and the UK signed a goods only Trade Continuity Agreement on 29 December 2020 following the end of Brexit transition period, as the UK became no longer a part of European Union–Turkey Customs Union. On 18 July 2023, Britain and Turkey announced their intentions to negotiate a new free trade agreement to replace the FTA signed in 2020 which replicated the EU-Turkey trade agreement, this updated agreement will also cover key areas of the UK economy like data, digital, and services.

== Military ==
During Theresa May's visit to Turkey in January 2017, BAE and TAI officials signed an agreement, worth about £100 million, for BAE to provide assistance in developing the TAI TFX aircraft. February 2021, it has been confirmed to members of the press corps, that high level talks have taken place on the possibility of selling Turkey an aircraft carrier of the UK flat top style. If it would be second hand, or built in Turkey with UK workers and experts, has not been confirmed. The state of Turkey and the United States has not been mentioned; in relation to the "F 35 Lightning" program; their build slot having been vacated as a result of relevant purchase of Russian anti-aircraft missile systems.

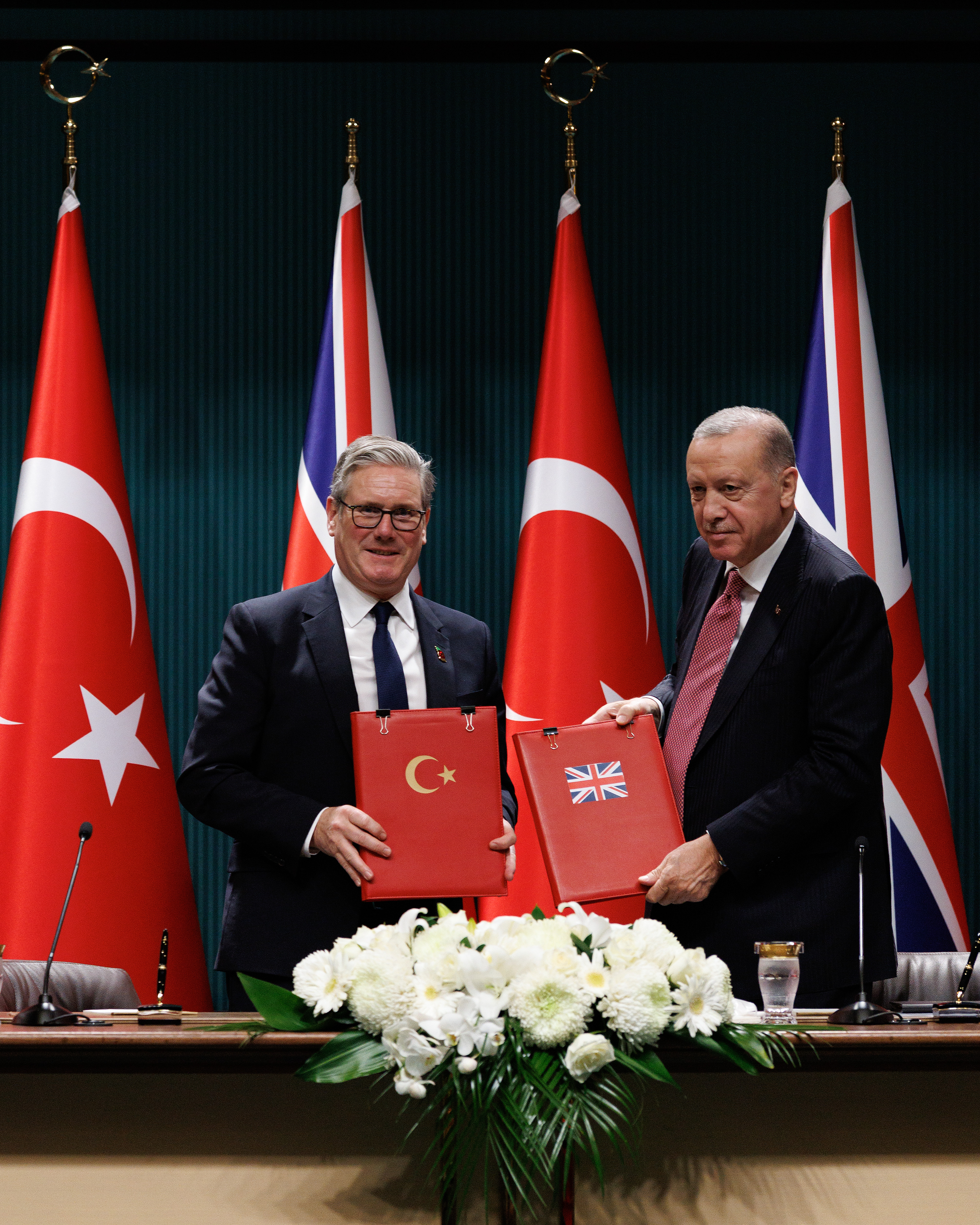

On 30 April 2025, Türkiye and the United Kingdom signed the Türkiye-U.K. Defense Industry Council (TUDIC) Specification, formalizing their cooperation in the defense sector. The agreement was signed in London by Haluk Görgün, Defence Industry Agency (SSB); Deputy Defense Minister Musa Heybet; and Maria Eagle, the U.K. Minister for Defense Procurement and Industry. This move aims to institutionalize collaboration between the two nations' defense industries, addressing evolving global security challenges and shared threats. The meeting also included participation from Turkish and British defense companies, highlighting a mutual commitment to strengthening their strategic partnership in defense.

In October 2025, British Prime Minister Starmer met with Turkish President Erdoğan in Ankara, where the two agreed that the UK would sell 20 Eurofighter Typhoon jets to Turkey in a deal worth up to £8 billion. The agreement marked Britain's biggest fighter-jet deal for almost two decades, and Turkey's first purchase of combat aircraft from a country other than the US.

== Diplomacy ==
Of the Republic of Turkey

- London (Embassy)
- London (Consulate-General)
- Edinburgh (Consulate-General)

Of the United Kingdom

- Ankara (Embassy)
- Istanbul (Consulate-General)
- Antalya (Consulate)
- İzmir (Consulate)

== See also ==
- Foreign relations of Turkey
- Foreign relations of the United Kingdom
- EU–Turkey relations
- EU–UK relations
- List of ambassadors of Turkey to the United Kingdom
- List of diplomats of the United Kingdom to the Ottoman Empire
- List of ambassadors of the United Kingdom to Turkey
- Turks in the United Kingdom
- Turks in Europe
