= Pakistan–Turkey Free Trade Agreement =

Pakistan-Turkey relations
- Pakistan: Turkey

The Turkey-Pakistan Free Trade Agreement (also known as Pakistan-Turkey FTA) is a free trade agreement between Pakistan and Turkey. It came into effect on 1 May 2023.

The decision to initiate negotiations for a comprehensive bilateral FTA covering trade in goods, services and investment was taken at the 4th Session of the High Level Strategic Cooperation Council (HLSCC) in Islamabad in February 2015. The FTA negotiations began in Ankara in October 2015. During negotiations held between August 29–31 in Islamabad, both countries agreed to eliminate 85% of tariffs.

The FTA is projected to increase bilateral trade to $5 billion between the years 2016 and 2019 and then to $10 billion by 2022. The free trade agreement between the two countries was expected to be signed before the end of 2016. The Turkish Industrialists' and Businessmen's Association and Karachi Chamber of Commerce & Industry have supported the FTA.
