= Integration law for immigrants to the Netherlands =

Dutch immigration law

Civil Integration Act 2021 (Dutch: Wet inburgering 2021)

States General of the Netherlands
- Citation: Stb. 2021, 586.
- Territorial extent: Netherlands
- Enacted by: States General of the Netherlands
- Royal assent: 30 November 2021
- Commenced: 1 January 2022
- Status: Amended

The integration law for immigrants to the Netherlands, known as the Civil Integration Act 2021 (Dutch: Wet inburgering 2021), is a law designed to ensure that long-term immigrants to the Netherlands, who are not citizens of the European Union, European Economic Area (Iceland, Liechtenstein and Norway) or Switzerland, integrate into Dutch society. This law requires immigrants to follow a structured process of integration including social integration, which includes learning the Dutch language, understanding Dutch society, and participating in civic life. Immigrants must complete this process, including passing an exam, within three years of their arrival in the Netherlands.

Since its introduction in 2006, the law has undergone several revisions. The most significant reforms, implemented in 2022, have been met with controversy for several reasons, ranging from concerns about the process's complexity and fairness to issues about how it affects different immigrant groups.

According to a separate law, known as the Wet inburgering in het buitenland, certain classes of prospective immigrants must also pass a test involving basic knowledge of Dutch and Dutch society even before they first enter the Netherlands.

== Introduction ==
Specific programs devoted to integration did exist before 2007. Between 1998 and 2007, new immigrants were obligated to follow an integration course that contained implemented standards on a national level. The courses were financed by the government and organized by local municipalities. There was, however, no compulsory test. Immigrants were fined only if they did not take the course without a valid reason.

The Law on Integration, drafted by Rita Verdonk, was passed by the House of Representatives (Tweede Kamer) on July 7, 2006, only one member of the House of Representatives, Fatma Koşer Kaya (D66), voted against it. It then passed the Senate (Eerste Kamer) on November 28, 2006 where four smaller political parties opposed it, totaling 13 out of 75 Senators. The law took effect on January 1, 2007. It provided legal framework for current programme, which is known as inburgering.

Inburgering is a requirement for residents who have relocated to the Netherlands from countries outside of the European Union, in addition to others in certain circumstances. After a period of three-and-a-half years (five years for some), they must pass an exam that evaluates various aspects of their integration. The current exam consists of six parts. Four measure Dutch language skills and include components that test an immigrants' speaking, listening, writing and reading abilities. The fifth tests their knowledge of Dutch society. The sixth portion, introduced in 2015, assesses their understanding of the Dutch labor market.

The obligation to take the test currently applies not only to new immigrants, but also to some who have lived in the Netherlands for five years or longer.

== Prior to traveling to the Netherlands ==
A similar obligation exists for some foreigners wishing to relocate to the Netherlands, especially people wanting to marry a resident or a citizen. These rules can be found in another law titled the Wet inburgering in het buitenland (“Integration law for Immigrants to the Netherlands Abroad”). The exam is requirement to receive a temporary long stay residence permit (Dutch: MVV) and is usually taken at a Dutch embassy.

== Failure to meet the obligations ==
Since the obligation was introduced for people entering after January 1, 2007, the law had no consequences for people failing to fulfill their obligations until July 1, 2010.

Local city councils are responsible for making sure that those obliged to take the exam do so. Failure to pass the test within the allotted time can result in financial penalties. The specifics depend on the resident's place of residence and can total anywhere from several hundred to more than 1,000 euros. However, residents can request additional time to prepare for the exam if their reasons for not adhering to their obligation is deemed sufficient. Contrary to popular belief, a resident cannot be denied residency because they have not passed the exam.

== Exceptions ==
The law does not apply to:

- Dutch nationals who reside abroad (see below for earlier drafts of the law)
- citizens of fellow EU countries, EEA countries, Switzerland and their legal spouses who are non EU nationals.
- minors (under the age of 18)
- retirees as per to retirement age in Netherlands (over the age of 66)
- residents who have certified diplomas, certificates etc. from certified Dutch-language institutions, for example Surinamese people;
- temporary foreign workers of Dutch employers or companies which are based in or operate within Netherlands
- temporary foreign and exchanges students and other academic researchers

In 2010, a Dutch judge ruled that the law ought not to be extended to Turkish citizens, because of an association treaty between the European Union and Turkey.

== Implementation and cost ==
The civic integration exam costs €250. The cost to learn the Dutch language can vary by the school, and how much Dutch the pupil already knows. The total amount DUO is willing to loan an asylum seeker to complete their studies is in excess of €10,000.

== Controversy ==
A major aspect of the controversy relates to the language proficiency requirement. The 2022 reforms introduced a higher language threshold for immigrants seeking permanent residency or citizenship. The required proficiency level was increased from CEFR A2 to B1, which is considered more challenging. While the A2 level is still accepted for certain pathways, the B1 level, is necessary for permanent residency. This change has been criticized as an obstacle to integration, as achieving B1-level proficiency within the three-year integration period may be difficult for certain groups.

Additionally, the financial burden placed on immigrants has raised concerns. Under the law, asylum seekers receive municipal support for integration courses and exams, but other groups, such as family migrants, are required to finance their own integration. This situation disproportionately affects lower-income individuals and has been viewed as a barrier to successful integration. The potential for penalties if the integration process is not completed within the required timeframe adds further stress, with fines and, in some cases, the denial of residency status posing risks to immigrants who struggle to meet the requirements.

The reforms also altered the support system for immigrants. While municipalities are responsible for overseeing the integration process, the extent of support varies depending on the category of the immigrant. Asylum seekers receive comprehensive assistance, but others, such as family members of skilled workers, are often left to navigate the integration system independently. This has led to criticisms of inequity in the distribution of resources and support.

== See also ==
- Integration of immigrants
