= Mexico–Turkey relations =

- Mexico: Turkey

The nations of Mexico and Turkey established diplomatic relations in 1928. Both nations are members of the G20, OECD and the United Nations.

== History ==
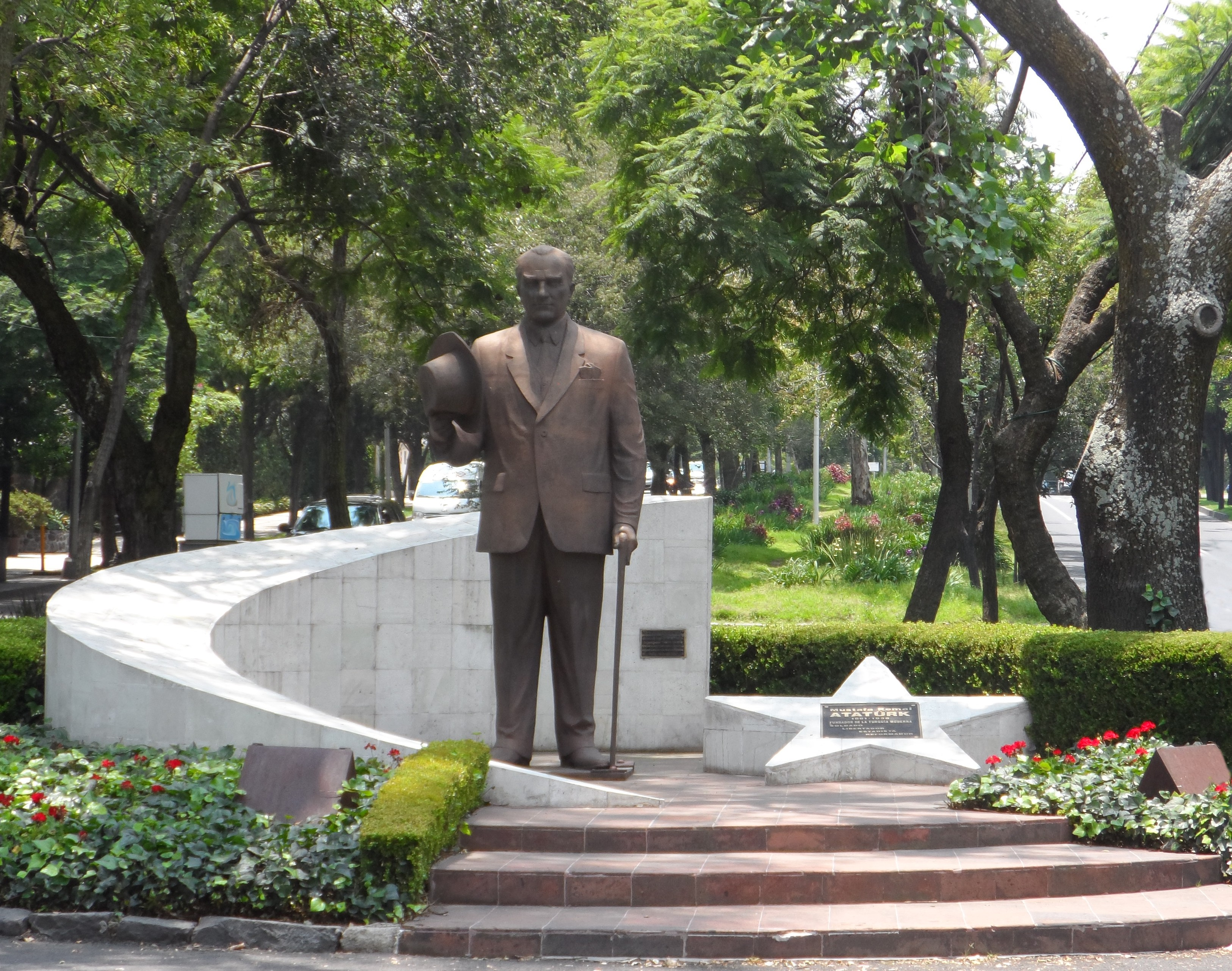
Statue of Turkish President (The founder of Turkey) Mustafa Kemal Atatürk in Mexico City

The first official contact between Mexico and the Ottoman Empire (present day Turkey) was 1864 when Emperor Maximilian I of Mexico sent out emissaries to several nations to seek official recognition of his rule in the country. Diplomatic relations between the two nations were established in 1928 after the transformation of Turkey from the Ottoman Empire by Mustafa Kemal Atatürk, founder of the modern Turkish republic in 1923; and after the end of the Mexican Revolution in 1920. That same year, both nations signed a 'Friendship Agreement'. Almost immediately, both nations opened diplomatic legations in each other's capitals, respectively.

Turkish ambassador to Mexico, Hasan Tahsin Mayatepek, laid the foundation for Mexican–Turkish relations during the 1930s, and had a great influence in the way Mexico, and its indigenous peoples like the Aztecs and Maya peoples are seen in Turkey. The Turkish Embassy in Mexico City opened in 1947. In 1962, their respective diplomatic missions were upgraded to embassies.

In June 1992, Mexican Foreign Secretary Fernando Solana paid an official visit to Turkey, becoming at the time the highest level government official to visit the country. While in Turkey, Secretary Solana and his counterpart, Foreign Minister Süleyman Demirel signed a few bilateral agreements. In 1998, Prime Minister Mesut Yılmaz became the first Turkish head-of-state to pay an official visit to Mexico. In 2009, then Prime Minister Recep Tayyip Erdoğan paid a visit to Mexico and met with President Felipe Calderón. In 2013, President Enrique Peña Nieto became the first Mexican head-of-state to pay a visit to Turkey.

Both nations are considered as regional powers and are playing bigger roles in the international community. Both nations have supported each other diplomatically, particularly in the United Nations and Mexico has supported Turkey over the issue of the Syrian Civil War occurring on its border. In 2013, Mexico donated US$1 million to Turkey for the support of over one million Syrian refugees that are currently being housed in the country.

In 2015, President Erdoğan returned to Mexico on a State visit. In July 2018, both nations celebrated 90 years of diplomatic relations.

In November 2022, Mexican Foreign Minister Marcelo Ebrard paid a visit to Turkey and met with his counterpart Mevlüt Çavuşoğlu. During the visit, both nations initiated discussions of a free trade agreement between them.

== High-level visits ==
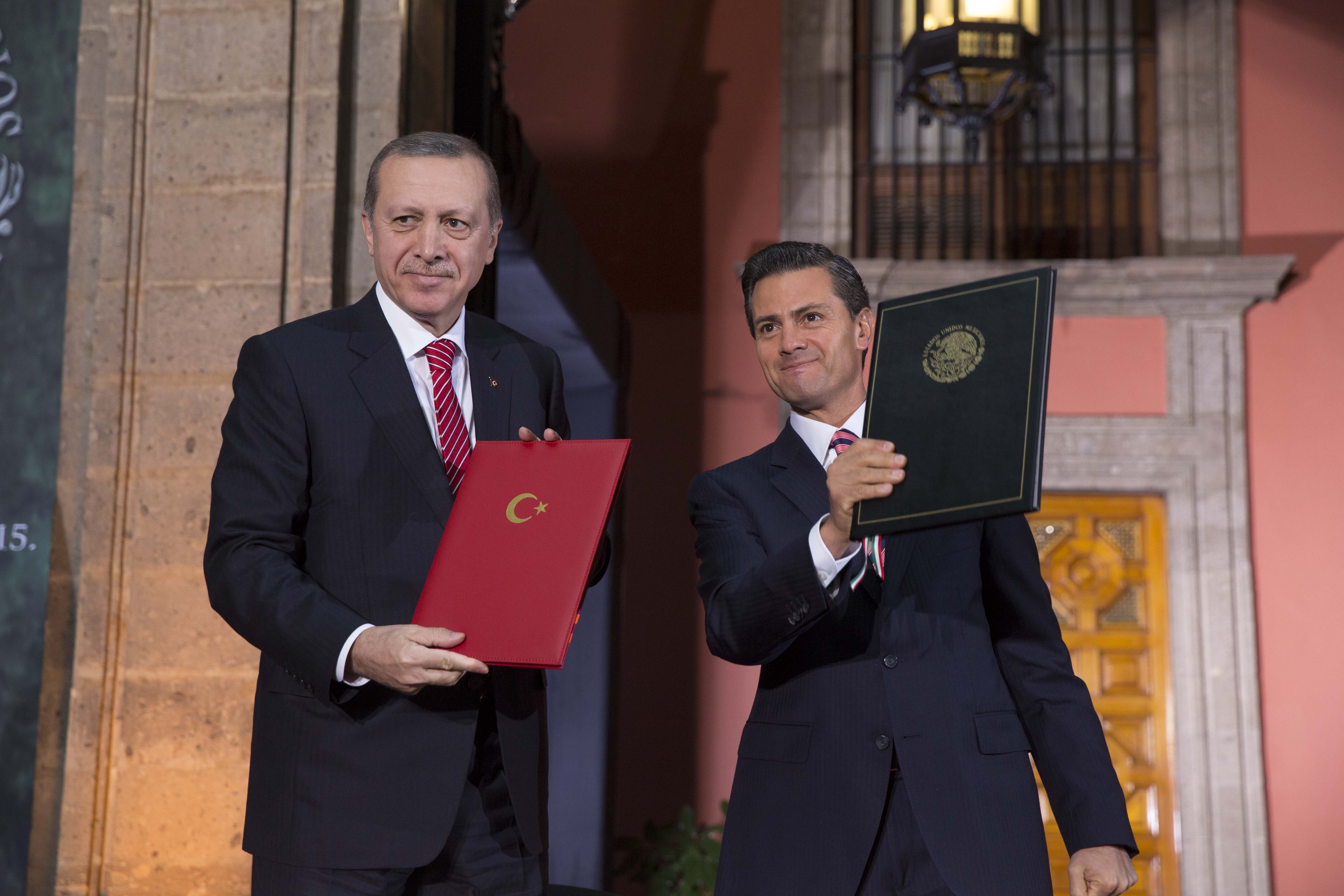
Turkish President Recep Tayyip Erdoğan on a State visit to Mexico along with Mexican President Enrique Peña Nieto, February 2015.

High-level visits from Mexico to Turkey

- Foreign Minister Fernando Solana (1992)
- President Enrique Peña Nieto (2013, 2015)
- Foreign Minister Marcelo Ebrard (2022)

High-level visits from Turkey to Mexico

- Prime Minister Mesut Yılmaz (1998)
- Prime Minister and President Recep Tayyip Erdoğan (2009, 2012, 2015)
- Foreign Minister Mevlüt Çavuşoğlu (2017, 2019)

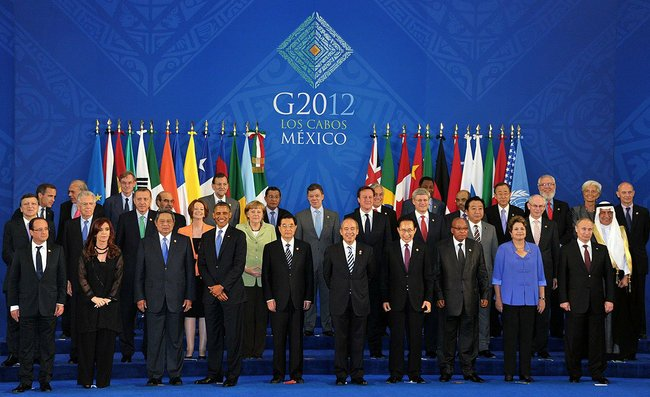
President Felipe Calderón and Prime Minister Recep Tayyip Erdoğan in Los Cabos; 2012.

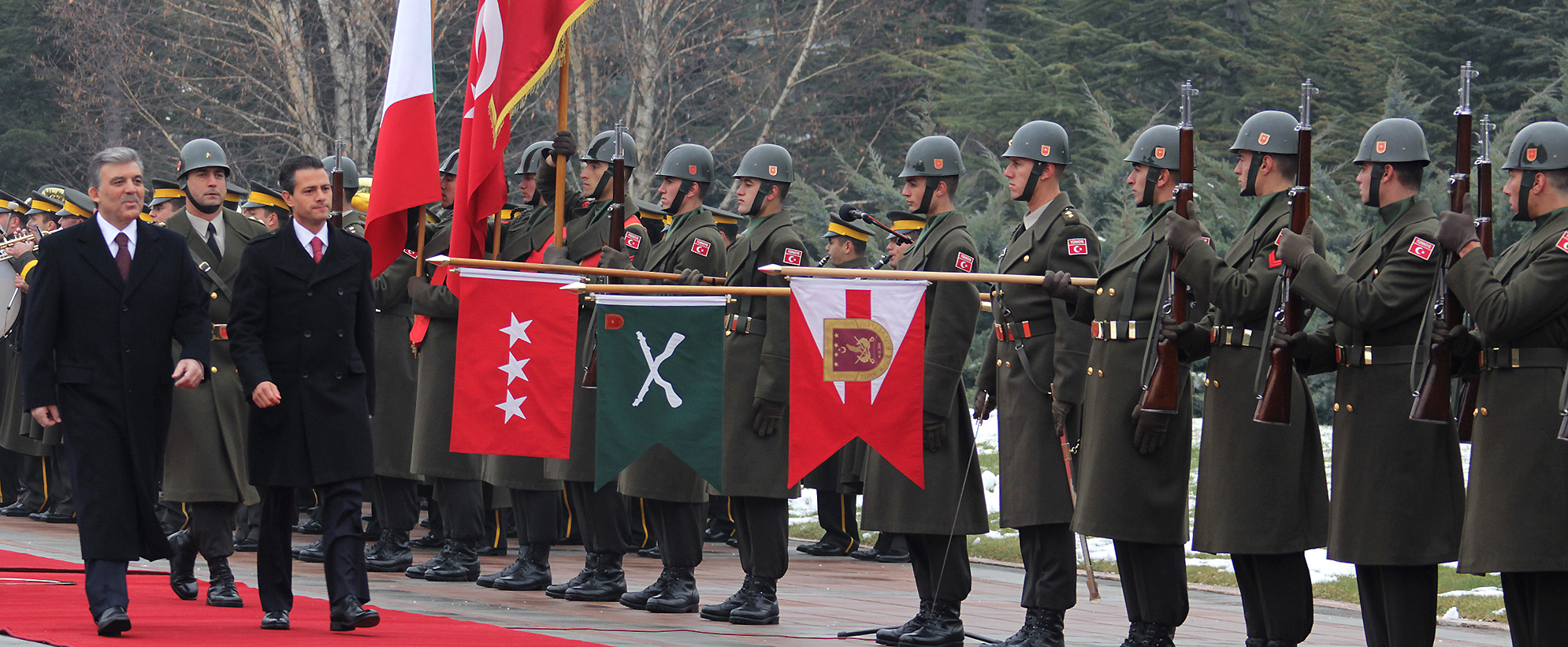
President Abdullah Gül and President Enrique Peña Nieto in Ankara, 2013.

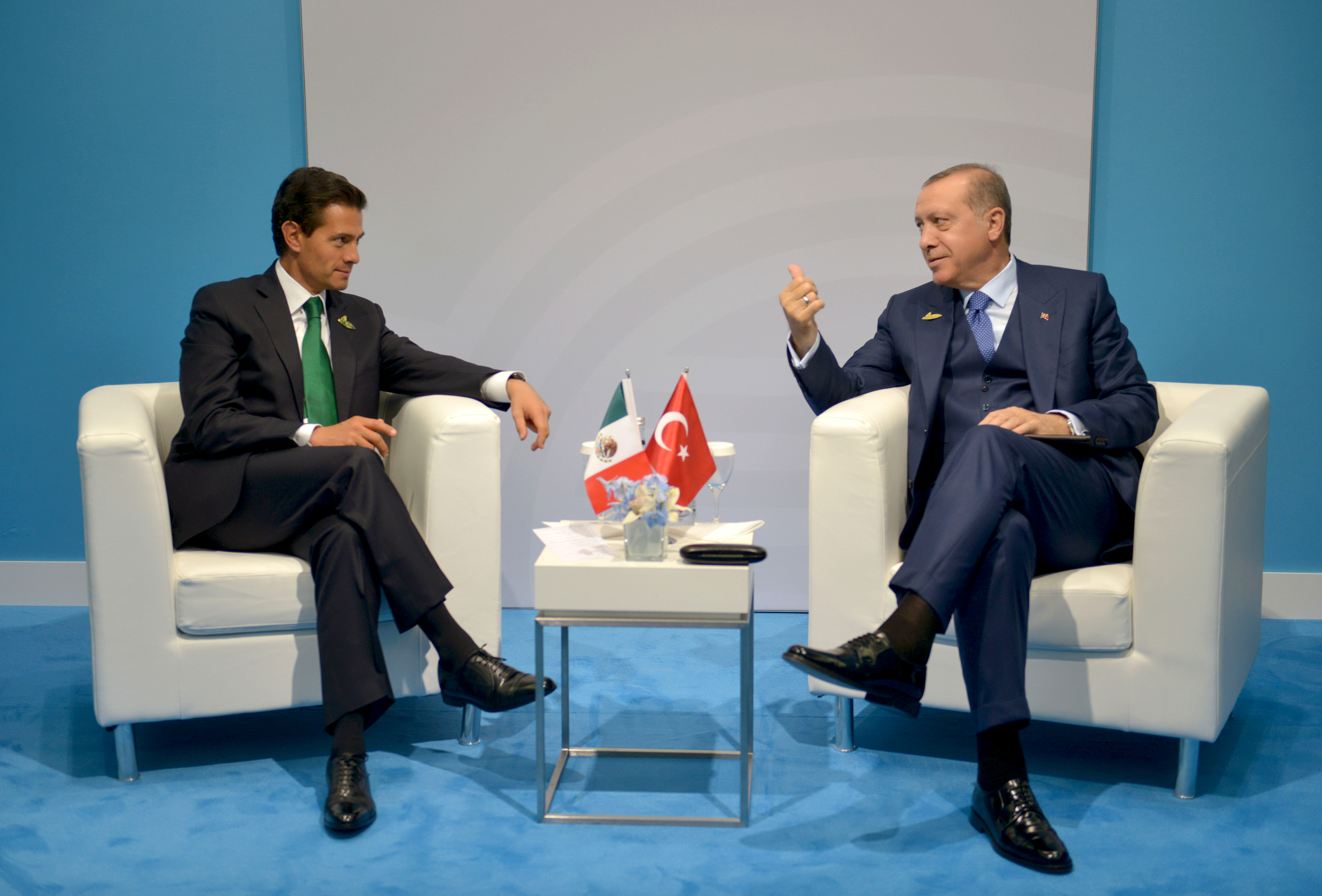
President Enrique Peña Nieto and President Recep Tayyip Erdoğan in Hamburg, Germany; 2017.

== Bilateral agreements ==
Both nations have signed several bilateral agreements, such as a Friendship Agreement (1928); Agreements on Educational and Cultural Cooperation (1992); Agreement on Eliminating Visa requirements for Diplomatic Passport holders (1992); Agreement on Economic and Trade Cooperation (1998); Agreement of Cooperation in Combating against Illicit Trafficking in Narcotic Drugs and Psychotropic Substances (2013); Agreement of Cooperation in Combating Organized Crime and Terrorism (2013) and an Agreement in Science and Technical Cooperation (2013); Agreement to Avoid Double Taxation and Prevent Tax Evasion in the Matter of Income Taxes (2013); Agreement on Air Transportation (2013); Agreement on Mutual Administrative Assistance and Exchange of Information on Customs Matters (2013); Memorandum of Understanding for the Establishment of a Mechanism of Consultation in Matters of Mutual Interest (2013); Agreement for the Reciprocal Protection of Investments (2013); Memorandum of Understanding on Cooperation in Science and Technology (2013) and a Memorandum of Understanding Cooperation in Export Credits between the National Exterior Commerce Bank (Bancomext) of Mexico and the Export Credit Bank of Turkey (Türk Eximbank) (2013).

== Transportation ==
There are direct flight between both nations with Turkish Airlines.

== Trade ==
In 2023, trade between both nations amounted to US$1.9 billion. Mexico's main exports to Turkey include: data processing machines, telephones and mobile phones, cotton, chemical based products, motor vehicles, scrap metal, gold, medical equipment, vegetables, and vegetable oil. Turkey's exports to Mexico include: parts and accessories for motor vehicles, motor vehicles, engines, iron and non-alloy steel, jewelry, clothing, chemical based products, seeds, fruits and nuts.

Mexican multinational companies such as Cemex, Gruma and Zinc Nacional (among others) operate in Turkey. Turkish multinational companies such as Mata Automotive, Orphan Holding, Tekno Kauch and Toto Max (among others) operate in Mexico.

== Resident diplomatic missions ==
- Mexico has an embassy in Ankara and a consulate in Istanbul.
- Turkey has an embassy in Mexico City.

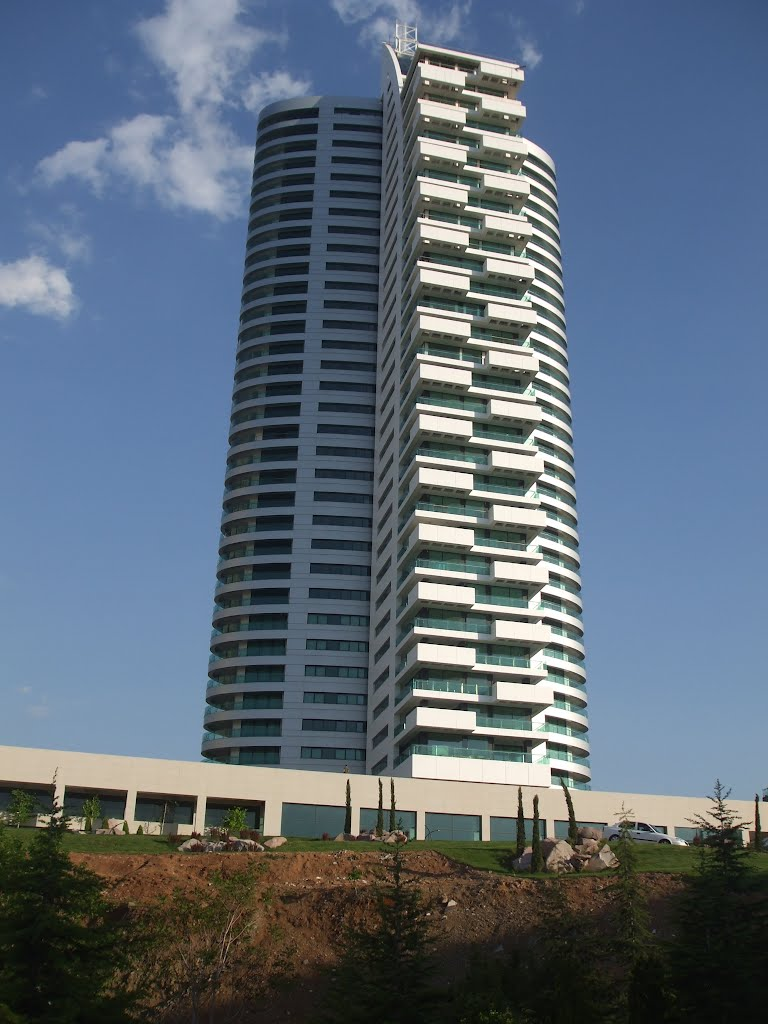
Çiçeği Residence hosting the Embassy of Mexico in Ankara

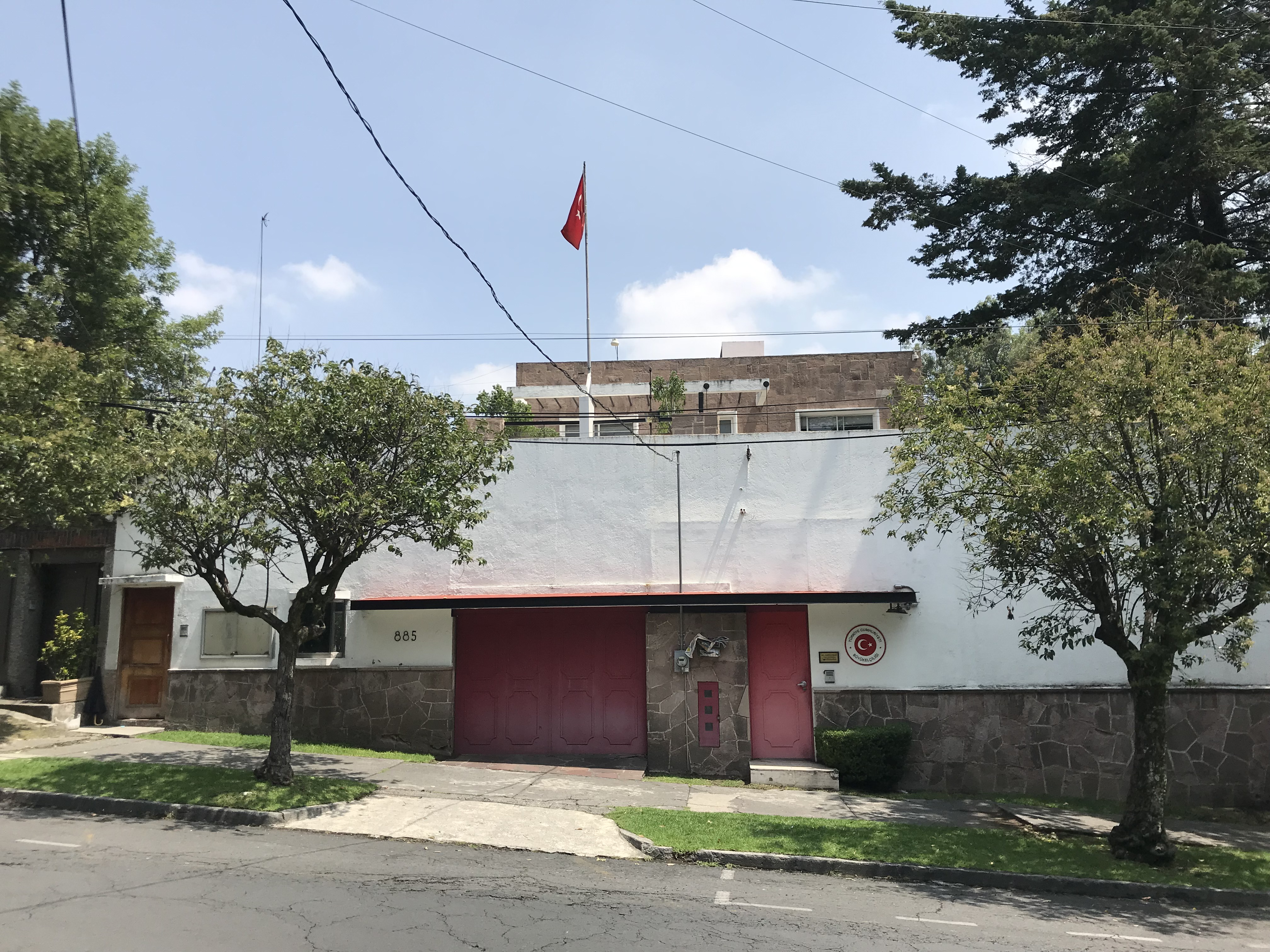
Embassy of Turkey in Mexico City

== Gallery ==
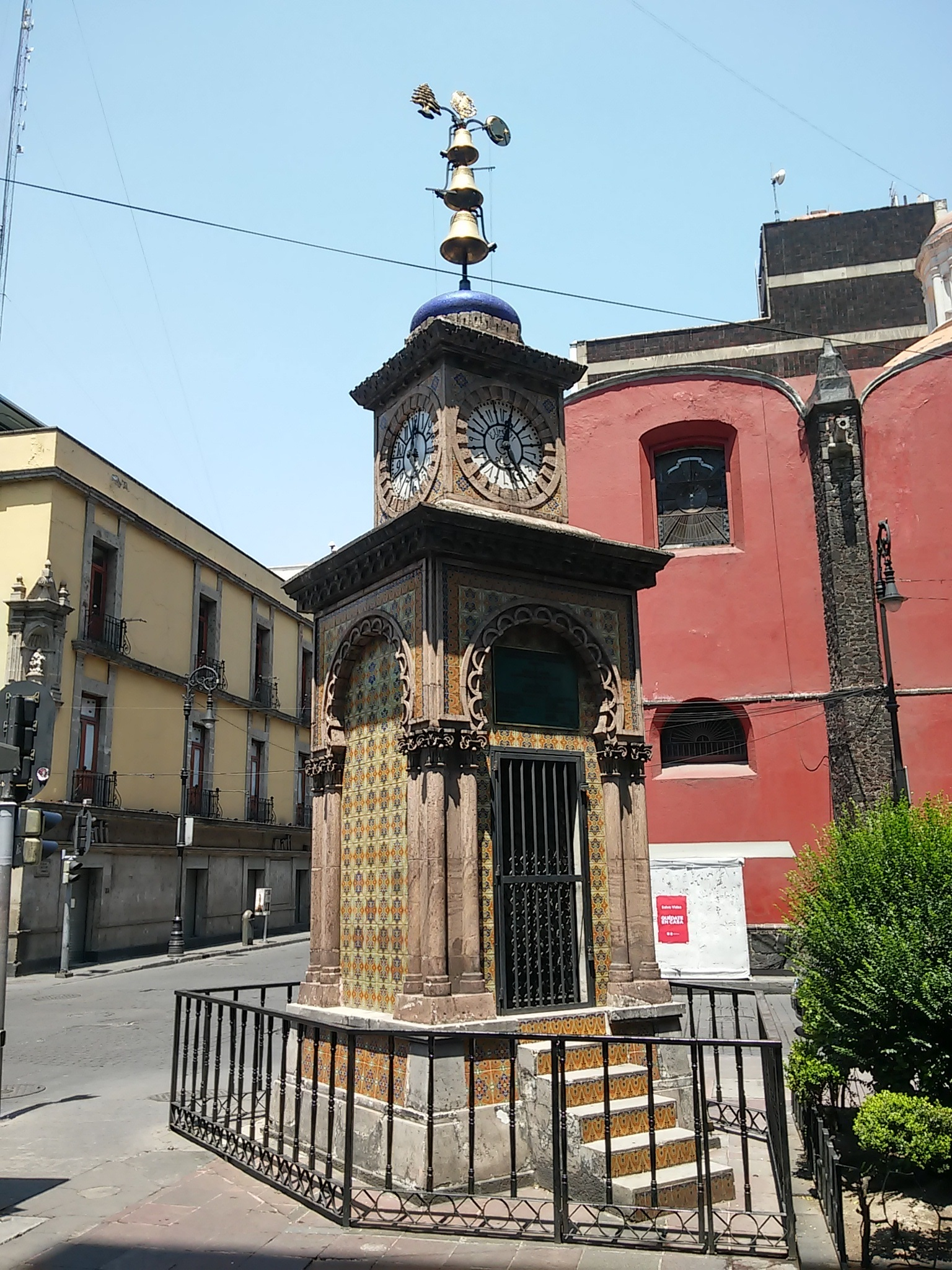
Ottoman clock in Mexico City

Flags of Mexico and Turkey at the National Palace in Mexico City

Turkish Cultural Center in Mexico City

Mexican President Enrique Peña Nieto at the Library of Celsus in Ephesus, Turkey in 2013

== See also ==
- Turks in Mexico
