= Economic Cooperation Organization Trade Agreement =

The Economic Cooperation Organization Trade Agreement or ECOTA is a preferential trade agreement reached on 17 July 2003 at the ECO summit in Islamabad whereby a preferential trade region was formed between the countries of Afghanistan, Azerbaijan, Iran, Kazakhstan, Kyrgyzstan, Pakistan, Tajikistan, Turkey, Turkmenistan and Uzbekistan. As of 2008, the ECOTA is in effect. As part of ECO Vision 2025, Afghanistan, Iran, Pakistan, Tajikistan and Turkey agreed to implement free trade area by 2025.

== See also ==
- Gül Train
- Shanghai Cooperation Organisation
- Middle East economic integration
- White card system
- Economic Cooperation Organization
