= Dienst Uitvoering Onderwijs =

Dutch government agency

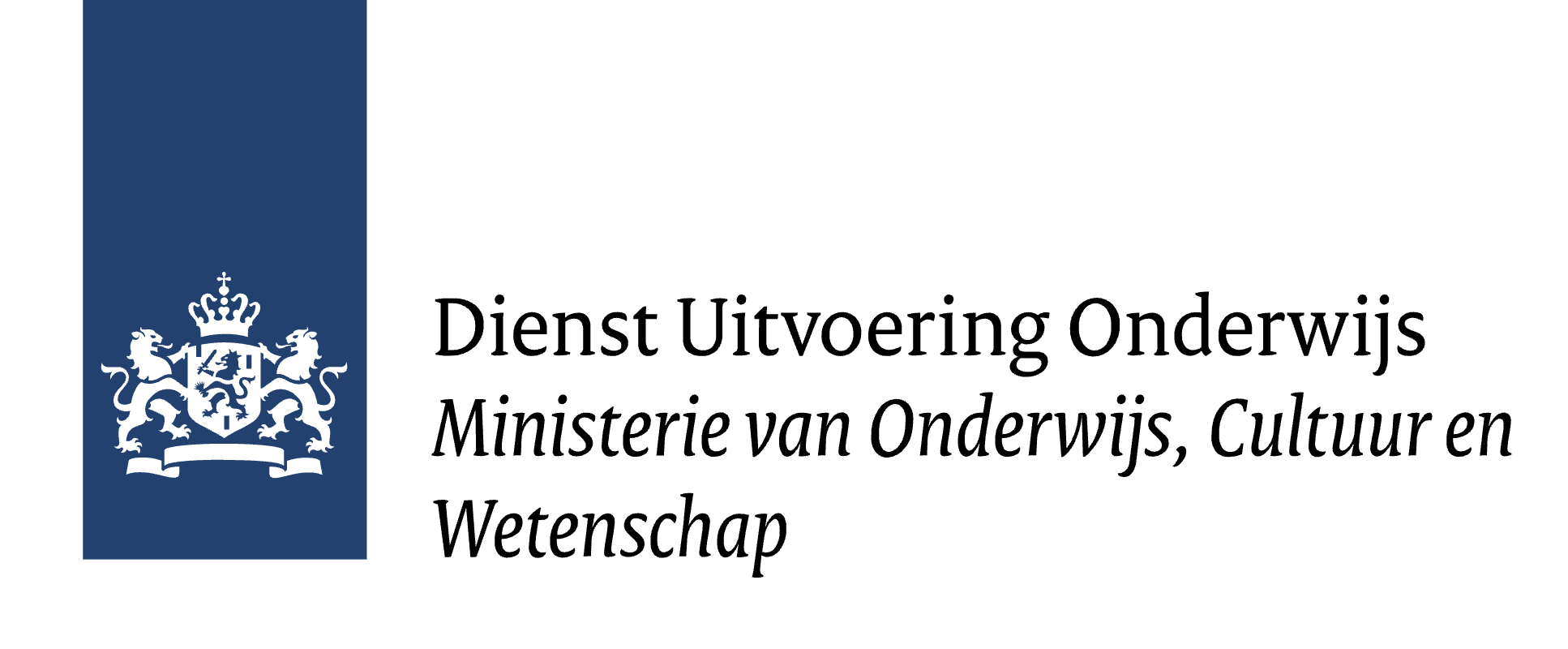

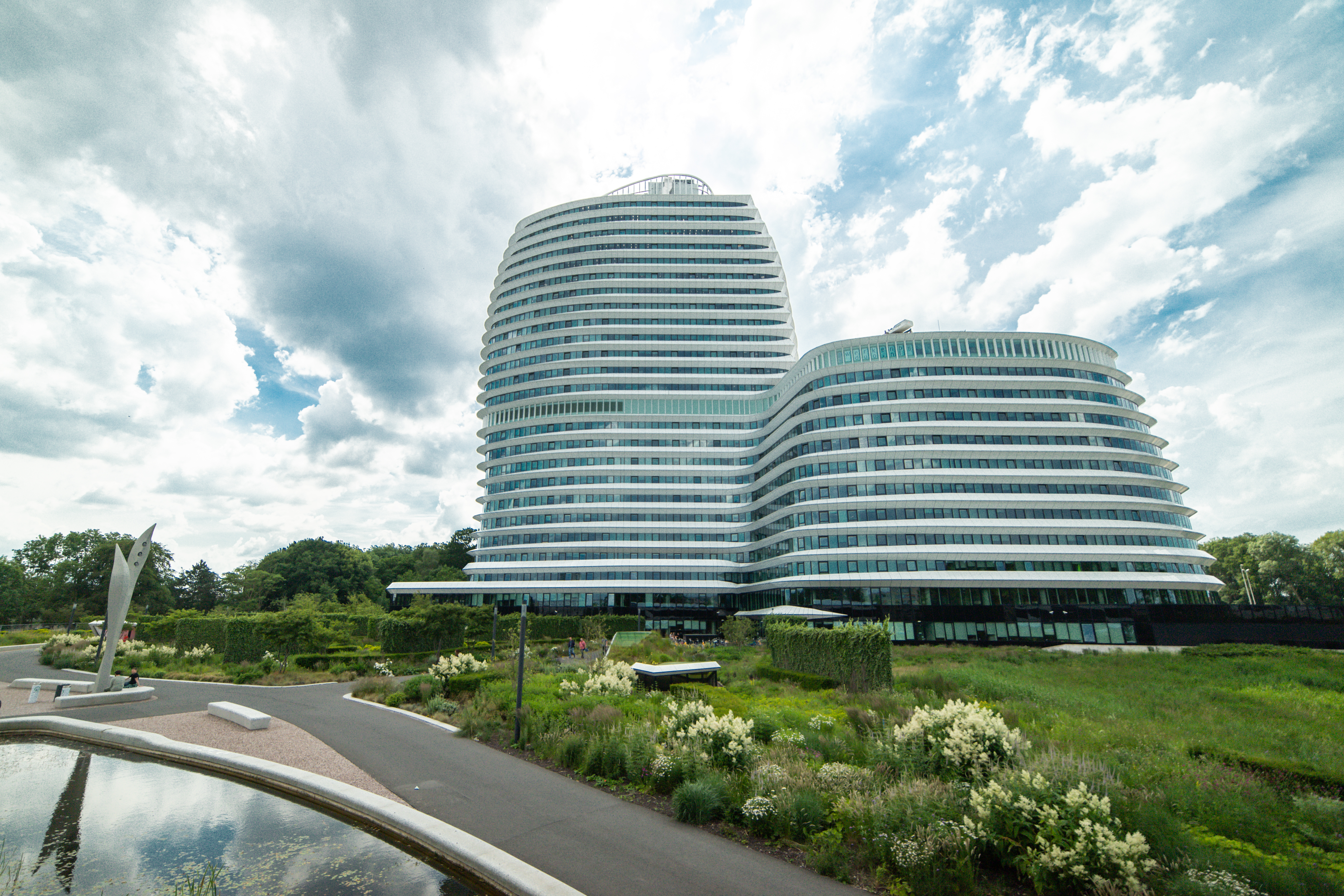
The DUO headquarters on Kempkensberg in Groningen (2019)

Dienst Uitvoering Onderwijs (DUO, the Education Executive Agency) is a government agency under the Dutch Ministry of Education, Culture and Science. DUO was formed on January 1, 2010, through a merger of Informatie Beheer Groep (IB-Groep) and Centrale Financiën Instellingen (CFI).

DUO implements various education laws and regulations. DUO also supports municipalities, on behalf of the Ministry of Social Affairs and Employment, in implementing the integration law for immigrants to the Netherlands.

== Activities ==
DUO performs the following tasks:

- Providing student grants, allowances, teacher grants, and loans and reimbursements to those subject to the civic integration requirement
- Funding educational institutions
- Maintaining the Basisregistratie Instellingen (BRIN) register of educational institutions
- Collecting tuition fees and student loans
- Managing the truancy reporting system
- Recognizing and legalizing diplomas
- Managing the diploma register
- Organizing state and civic integration examinations
- Enriching educational data into information products
- Performing logistical work for the Eindexamen in secondary education
- Managing the application, selection, and placement process for lottery-based higher education programs
- Collecting and managing educational data in various registers
- Managing the register of institutions that have signed the Code of Conduct for International Students in Dutch Higher Education.
- Serving as the National Europass Center in the Netherlands Managing information systems within the framework of the integration law for immigrants to the Netherlands.

== Beneficiaries ==
The following groups, among others, use DUO's services:

- Students and their parents, including international students
- Former students repaying their educational loans
- Teachers
- Recent immigrants to the Netherlands
- Educational institutions in primary, secondary, vocational, and higher education
- Government organizations, such as municipalities and youth transition centers.

== Locations ==
DUO's headquarters is located in Groningen. There is also a branch in The Hague. Furthermore, there are six service offices throughout the country and two service desks, in Enschede and Maastricht. DUO also has seven test locations for civic integration exams.

=== Kempkensberg ===
In 2011, DUO headquarters moved into a new building known as Kempkensberg, located near the Groningen Europapark station at Europapark in the Zuid district of Groningen-Zuidoost. The building is shared with the Tax and Customs Administration. Construction of Kempkensberg began in late 2008 and was completed in 2011. It has 24 floors and houses 2,600 employees.

== History ==
=== Department of the Ministry of Education and Science ===
In the first (1960) and second (1966) Spatial Planning Statements, the government outlined a policy of relocating government organizations outside of the Randstad to the northern and southern provinces. This measure was intended to relieve development pressure on the Randstad while simultaneously creating jobs in regions where unemployment was high at the time.

As part of the policy, the first civil servants of the then Ministry of Education and Science moved to Groningen in 1969. This branch of the ministry was called "Study Cost Allowance." The civil servants of this branch managed the study grants for secondary school students.

A year later, 25 civil servants followed to manage grants for university and higher education at the National Study Grants department. In 1973, the National Study Grants and Study Cost Allowance departments were merged under the name Centrale Directie Studiefinanciering (CDS, Central Directorate for Student Finance). In 1974, the Central Registration and Placement Office also moved from The Hague to Groningen.

=== Informatiseringsbank ===
The policy and implementation of the Student Finance Act were previously not organizationally separated. Problems arose during the implementation of the act in 1988 because the act had to be implemented too quickly. As a result, it was decided to separate policy and implementation. Therefore, the more independent Informatiseringsbank was established in 1988. This merged three directorates of the Ministry of Education and Science, including the Central Directorate for Student Finance.

=== BKO and CFI ===
In 1992, the Secretary-General of the Ministry of Education, Culture and Science implemented Minister Jo Ritzen's mandate to separate policy and implementation by establishing BKO. The organization was located in Zoetermeer and was renamed CFI that same year. This name was based on the three directorates: Corporate Affairs, Finance, and Infrastructure, but later became the abbreviation for Central Financial Institutions.

=== Informatie Beheer Groep ===
In 1994, the Ministry of Education and Science's Informatiseringsbank directorate was replaced by a new independent administrative body, Informatie Beheer Groep (Information Management Group).

=== CFI agency status ===
In 1996, CFI was changed within the Ministry of Education, Culture and Science from an independent directorate to an agency.
