= Ankara Agreement =

1963 treaty between Turkey and the EEC

Agreement Creating An Association Between The Republic of Turkey and the European Economic Community Türkiye ile Avrupa Ekonomik Topluluğu Arasında Bir Ortaklık Yaratan Anlaşma
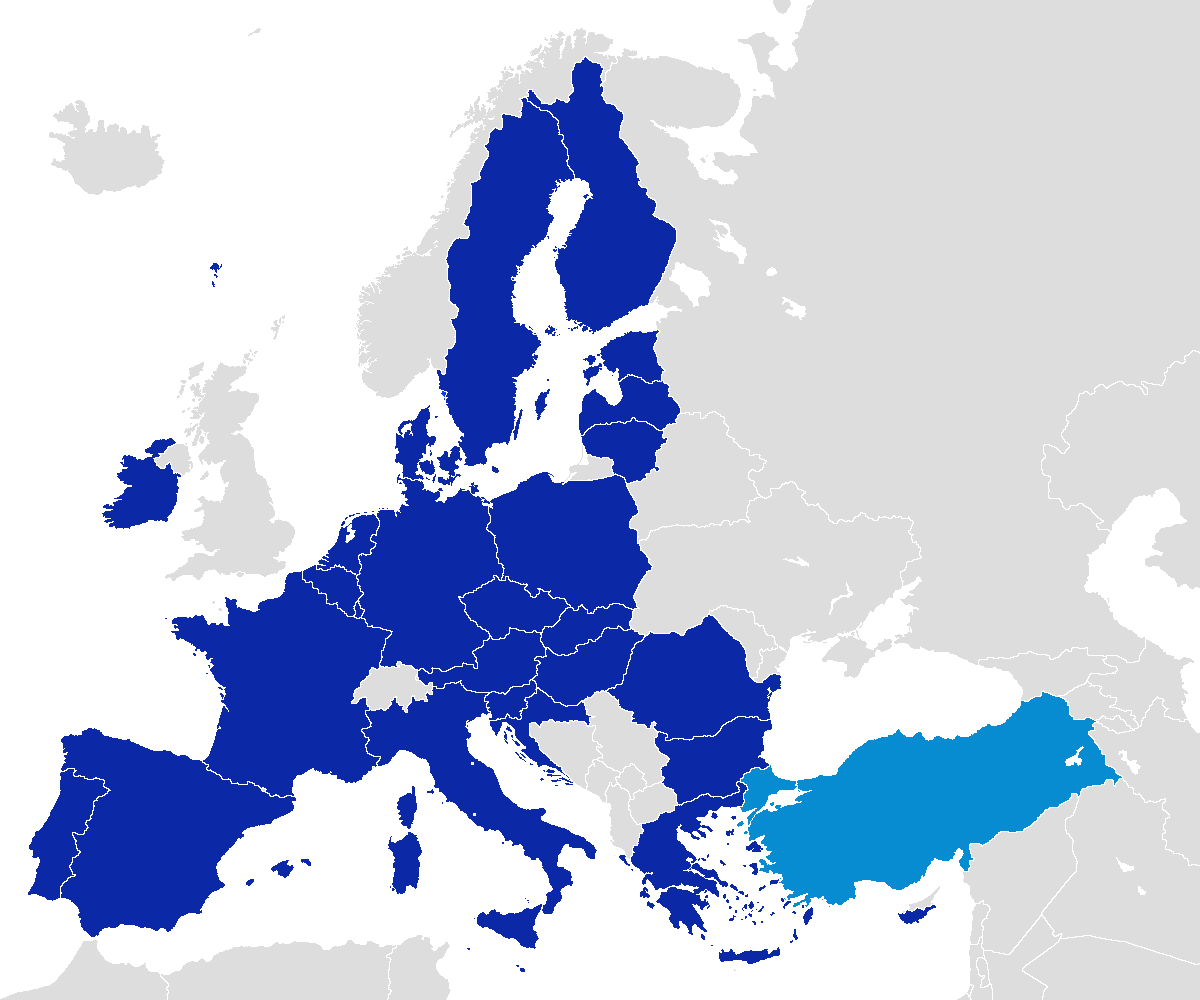
- Turkey and the European Union, succeeding organisation of the European Economic Community.
- Signed: 1 September 1963
- Location: Ankara, Turkey
- Effective: 12 September 1963
- Parties: Belgium; West Germany; France; Italy; Luxembourg; Netherlands; Turkey; European Economic Community
- Language: English

Full text
- Ankara Agreement at Wikisource

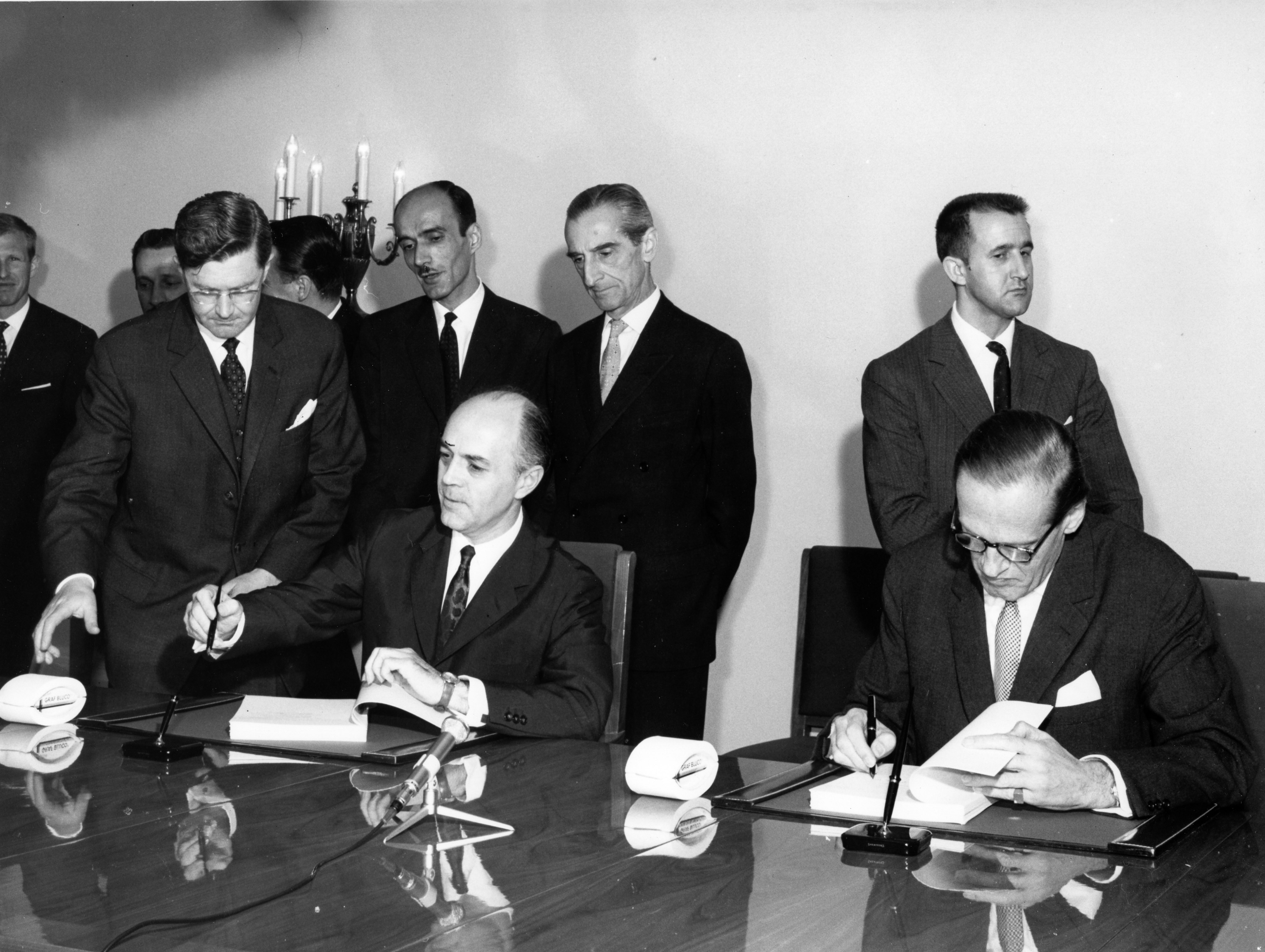
Signing of the association agreement between Turkey and the EEC

The Agreement Creating An Association Between The Republic of Turkey and the European Economic Community, commonly known as the Ankara Agreement (Turkish: Ankara Anlaşması), is a treaty signed in 1963 that provides for the framework for the co-operation between Turkey and the European Union (EU).

== Background ==
Turkey first applied for associate membership of the European Economic Community (EEC) in July 1959, the EEC having been established in 1958. The EEC responded by suggesting the establishment of an association as an interim measure leading to full accession. This led to negotiations which resulted in the Ankara Agreement on September 12, 1963.

== Agreement ==
The Ankara Agreement was signed on 12 September 1963 in Ankara. The Agreement initiated a three-step process toward creating a customs union to help secure Turkey's full membership in the EEC. Upon creation, the customs union would begin the integration of economic and trade policy, which the EEC considered necessary.

An Association Council, set up by the Agreement, controls its development and gives the Agreement detailed effect by making decisions.

In 1970, Turkey and the EEC agreed an Additional Protocol to the Agreement.

One part of the Agreement was to be financial assistance from the EEC to Turkey, including loans worth 175 million ECU during the period from 1963 to 1970. The results were mixed; EEC trade concessions to Turkey in the form of tariff quotas proved less effective than hoped, but the EEC's share in Turkish imports rose substantially during the period.

The Agreement sought the free circulation of workers, establishment and services, including virtually total harmonisation with EEC policies relating to the internal market. However, it excluded Turkey from political positions and precluded its recourse to the European Court of Justice for dispute resolution to some extent.

With the European Union replacing the EEC with the entry into force of the Lisbon Treaty, the Ankara Agreement now governs relations between Turkey and the EU.

=== Individual rights ===
The Agreement, its Additional Protocol and Decisions of the Association Council are part of EEC law. The European Court of Justice has decided that these give specific rights to Turkish nationals and businesses that the EEC Member States are required by EEC law to respect.

Under Article 6(1) of Association Council Decision 1/80, Turkish nationals legally employed in an EEC member state for a certain period gain rights to remain or switch employment in that state:

- a Turkish national legally employed by the same employer for one year has the right to permission from the member state to remain in that employment;
- a Turkish national legally employed for three years in a particular area of work has the right to permission from the member state to take employment with any employer in that area;
- a Turkish national legally employed for four years has the right to permission from the member state to take employment with any employer.

A Turkish national who works legally as an au pair or while a student can count as a worker.

== See also ==
- Accession of Turkey to the European Union
- Turkey–European Union relations
- European Union–Turkey Customs Union
