= European Union–Turkey Customs Union =

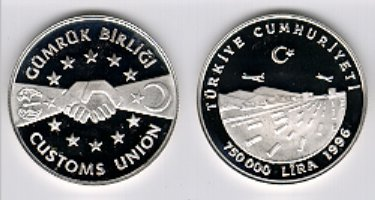
Commemorative Turkish coin for EU-Turkey customs union

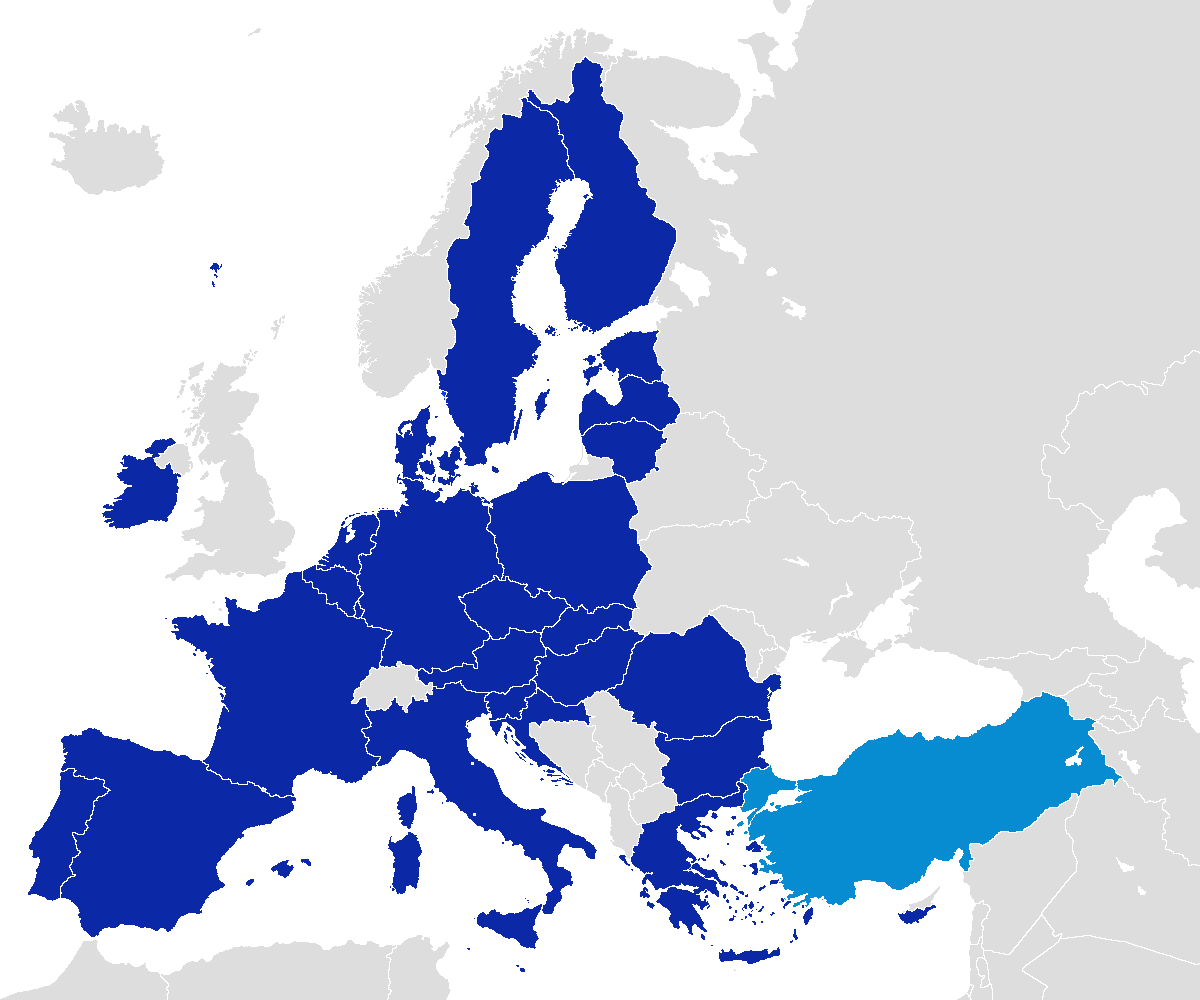
Candidate country Turkey and the European Union

The European Union–Turkey Customs Union is a trade agreement between the European Union (EU) and Turkey. The agreement came into effect on 31 December 1995, following a 6 March 1995 decision of the European Community–Turkey Association Council to implement a customs union (Turkish: Gümrük Birliği) between the two parties. Goods may travel between the two entities without any customs restrictions. The Customs Union does not cover essential economic areas such as agriculture (to which bilateral trade concessions apply), services or public procurement.

In 1996, a free trade area was established between Turkey and the European Union for products covered by the European Coal and Steel Community. Decision 1/98 of the Association Council covers trade in agricultural products.

In addition to providing for a common external tariff for the products covered, the Customs Union foresees that Turkey is to align to the acquis communautaire in several essential internal market areas, notably with regard to industrial standards.

According to a 2020 study, the agreement boosted trade between the EU and Turkey. In manufacturing, there was a 55–65 per cent increase in EU‐Turkey trade compared with the Ankara Agreement.

== Results for Turkey ==
The customs union increased both imports and exports in Turkey. In the period following the union, Turkey's GDP per capita increased. Turkey's membership of the customs union also correlates with its economy's transition from agrarian to industrial.

As Turkey is in a customs union with the EU, it has to adjust its tariffs and duties to match those of the EU. However, the free trade agreements (FTAs) signed by the EU do not extend to Turkey, so the EU's FTA partners can export to Turkey tariff-free, while maintaining tariffs on Turkish goods, unless they also conclude a separate FTA agreement with Turkey. During the negotiation of the Transatlantic Trade and Investment Partnership (TTIP), Turkey raised the prospect of leaving the customs union over the economic contraction it would suffer as American goods would enter Turkey tariff-free and Turkish goods would continue to face American tariffs. The EU and Turkey have been in negotiations for amending the customs union agreement to add Turkey to the EU's present and future FTAs.

== EU member state candidacy ==
Turkey has been an associate member of the European Community (EC) since 1964, following the signing in 1963 of the Ankara Agreement (EEC-Turkey Association Agreement (1963)) with the EEC. Turkey applied for full membership on 14 April 1987.

The decision to consider Turkey's application was deferred until 1993, because the European Community was in the process of becoming the even (politically and economically) tighter European Union. The fall of the Soviet Union and German reunification delayed the decision on Turkish membership even more. During those years the European Community had also become reluctant to consider Turkey's application.

At the Helsinki summit in December 1999 Turkey was given the status of a candidate country. At the end of 2004, the European Commission has issued a report with positive recommendations to the European Council, indicating the degree of compliance by Turkey of the Copenhagen political criteria. On this basis, the European Council decided to start accession negotiations with Turkey on 3 October 2005. Since then, no significant progress has been made towards membership nor is there evidence of political will to do so.

== Update proposals ==
In December 2016, the European Commission released an assessment proposing to update and modernize the agreement which includes services and public procurement. The report concluded with two options; Enhanced Commercial Framework (ECF) or Deep and Comprehensive Free Trade Area (DCFTA). As of 2020 March, the Council hadn't adapted either of the proposals. Since 2015, the Turkish government has had several meetings to assess updating the agreement.

== Euro-Mediterranean free trade area ==
Turkey is also a member of the Euro-Mediterranean partnership and as such is interested in concluding free trade agreements with all other Mediterranean partners, with a view to the creation of a Euro-Mediterranean free trade area, originally aimed for by 2010.

== Criticism ==
The agreement is criticized by some, as the agreement itself does not provide any political or economic powers to Turkey in the European Union while granting some to the Union towards Turkey; thus it is compared to the capitulations of the Ottoman Empire.

== See also ==
- European Union–Turkey relations
- European Union Customs Union
- Ankara Agreement
