= Consulate General of the Philippines, Seattle =

Diplomatic mission of the Philippines in Seattle, United States

Consulate General of the Philippines, Seattle Konsulado Panlahat ng Pilipinas sa Seattle

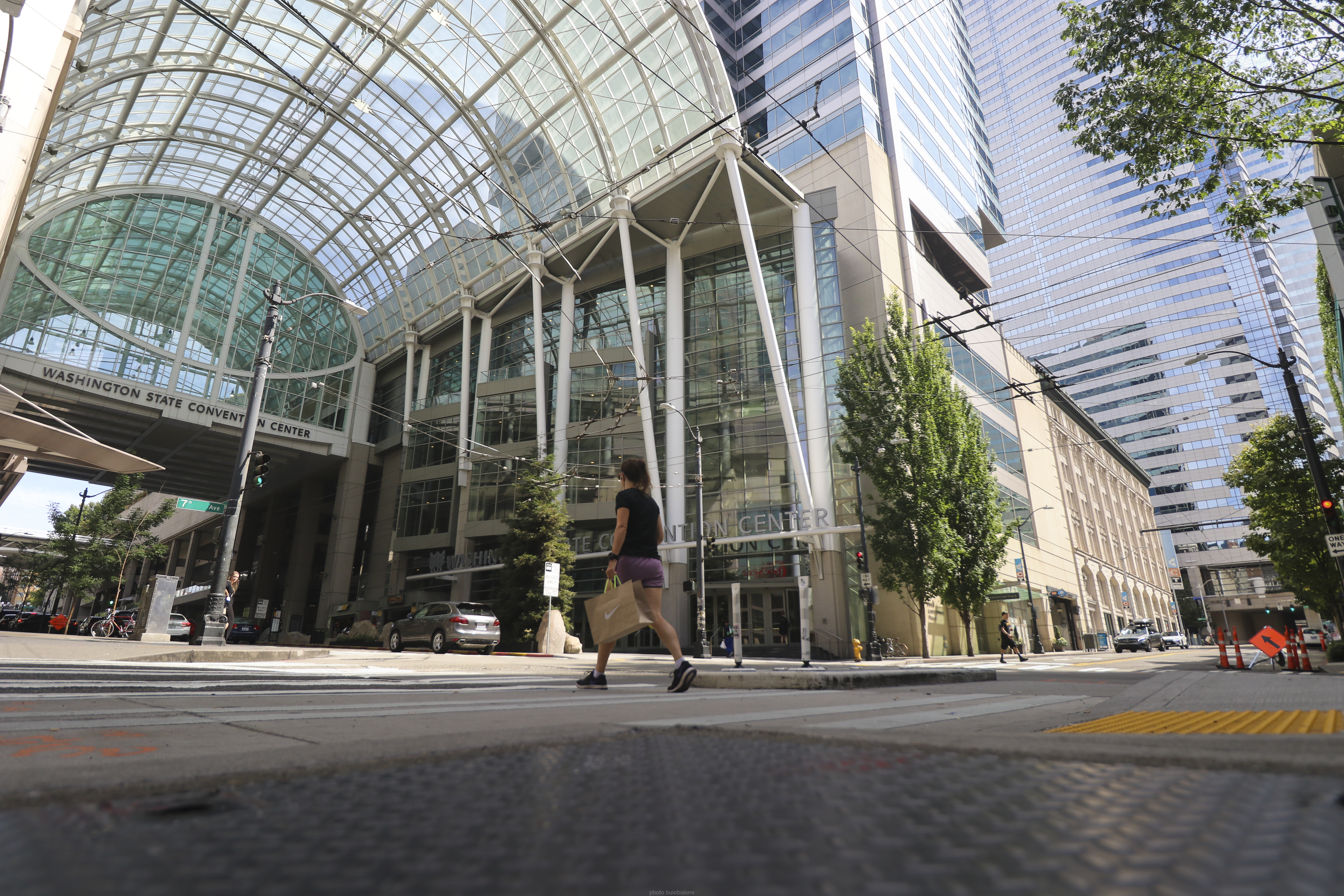
- Seattle Convention Center where the Consulate General of the Philippines is located
- Location: Seattle, Washington, U.S.
- Address: 701 Pike Street, Suite 1510
- Coordinates: 47°36′41.0″N 122°19′58.6″W
- Consul General: Henry S. Bensurto Jr.
- Website: pcgseattle.org

The Consulate General of the Philippines in Seattle is a diplomatic mission of the Republic of the Philippines in the United States, representing the country's interests in northwestern United States, encompassing the states of Washington, Oregon, Idaho, Montana, and Alaska. It is located on the fifteenth floor of One Convention Place, part of the Seattle Convention Center in the downtown area of Seattle.

Although the current consulate dates from 2026, the Philippines also previously maintained a consulate in Seattle between 1948 and 1993.

== History ==
The Philippine Consulate General in Seattle was first opened on February 26, 1948, with Pedro G. Ramirez, who was previously consul at the Philippine Consulate General in Honolulu, serving as the mission's first consul. Ramirez, who arrived in Seattle from Honolulu a few days before, opened the consulate with a clerk and a secretary as his only other staff members, and much of the mission's early work was focused on promoting trade relations between the Philippines and the Pacific Northwest.

The mission's size and footprint grew rapidly in its early years. Following the closure of the Philippine Consulate in nearby Portland, Oregon, in 1949, its six staff members were absorbed by the Seattle mission, and its territorial jurisdiction expanded beyond Washington to include the states of Oregon, Idaho, Montana, and Wyoming, and the Territory of Alaska. In 1954, a member of the Filipino community in Seattle, Juan Z. Bagasan, reportedly stole pieces of the consulate's official stationery, which he then used to write a letter to a judge of a Washington State superior court expressing his opinion at one of its rulings.

In 1985, during the regime of Ferdinand Marcos, the consulate was named as one of a number of "overstaffed" posts, with excess personnel being recalled as part of a wider rationalization program that also led to the shrinking of the Philippines' diplomatic presence abroad. The following year, more than 100 people staged a protest at the consulate in the run-up to the People Power Revolution both to celebrate the impending downfall of Marcos and demand the immediate installation of Corazon Aquino as president.

Although the Washington House of Representatives passed a resolution requesting that the mission be kept open, the Philippine government announced the mission's closure in February 1993, alongside 11 other missions that were all set to close by June 30, 1993, due to financial constraints. Over the years, Filipinos in Seattle have demanded the mission's reopening, with a local community group leading a petition to demand its reopening in 2022, and protests happening as recently as December 2025.

On February 9, 2026, after having allocated funds to do so in 2024, the Philippine Department of Foreign Affairs released a press release announcing the consulate's reopening, also naming a new consul to head the mission. While set to formally open later in the year, it officially opened for limited consular services on July 14, 2026.

== Staff and activities ==
The Philippine Consulate General in Seattle is headed by Consul General Henry S. Bensurto Jr., who assumed his position on January 22, 2026. Prior to his appointment as consul general, Bensurto, a career diplomat, had been previously deployed to the Philippine Embassy in Ankara as ambassador to Turkey.

The consulate's jurisdiction covers much of its previous territory, which had been placed under the jurisdiction of the Philippine Consulate General in San Francisco, except Wyoming which remains under the San Francisco mission's jurisdiction.

On May 19, 2026, activists staged a protest outside the consulate demanding justice for the 19 victims of the Toboso encounter in Negros Occidental.

== See also ==
- List of diplomatic missions of the Philippines
- List of diplomatic missions in Seattle
