= List of ambassadors of the Philippines to Turkey =

Ambassador of the Republic of the Philippines to the Republic of Türkiye
- Sugo ng Republika ng Pilipinas sa Republika ng Turkiya; Filipinler Cumhuriyeti'nin Türkiye Cumhuriyeti Büyükelçisi
- Seal of the Department of Foreign Affairs of the Philippines
- Incumbent; Jaime Ramon T. Ascalon since May 7, 2026
- Department of Foreign Affairs; Embassy of the Philippines, Ankara
- Style: His Excellency
- Reports to: Department of Foreign Affairs
- Seat: Ankara, Turkey
- Nominator: Secretary of Foreign Affairs
- Appointer: President of the Philippines; with the advice and consent of the Commission on Appointments
- Term length: No fixed term
- Inaugural holder: Bonifacio P. Arribas
- Formation: October 30, 1991
- Website: Philippine Embassy, Ankara

The ambassador of the Republic of the Philippines to the Republic of Türkiye (Filipino: Sugo ng Republika ng Pilipinas sa Republika ng Turkiya; Turkish: Filipinler Cumhuriyeti'nin Türkiye Cumhuriyeti Büyükelçisi) is an officer of the Philippine Department of Foreign Affairs and the head of the Embassy of the Philippines to the Republic of Turkey. The position has the rank and status of an ambassador extraordinary and plenipotentiary.

Before the post's formation in October 1991, the Philippines and Turkey had exchanged their ambassadors through non-resident embassies. In 1990, the Turkish government established a resident embassy in Manila, and the Philippine government also established its resident embassy in Ankara the following year.

== List of representatives ==
Head of mission	Tenure	Note(s)
Bonifacio P. Arribas	1991–1994	Credentials were presented on 30 October 1991.
Minerva Jean A. Falcon	1994–1996	
Jose Lino B. Guerrero	1997–1999	
Ofelia B. Castaño	1999–2005	
Bahnarim A. Guinomia	2006–2009	
Pedro O. Chan	2009–2011	
Marilyn J. Alarilla	2011–2013	
Maria Rowena M. Sanchez	2013–2018	Credentials were presented on 23 December 2013.
Raul S. Hernandez	2019–2020	Credentials were presented on 22 August 2019.
Maria Elena P. Algabre	2021–2023	Credentials were presented on 1 September 2021.
Henry S. Bensurto Jr.	2023–2026	Appointed by Bongbong Marcos on 24 March 2023. Credentials were presented on 12 March 2024.
Jaime Ramon T. Ascalon	2026–present	Appointed by Bongbong Marcos on 13 August 2025 and was later confirmed by the Commission on Appointments. Credentials were presented on 7 May 2026.
Source: Embassy of the Republic of the Philippines, Ankara

== See also ==
- Foreign relations of the Philippines
- Foreign relations of Turkey
- List of ambassadors of Turkey to the Philippines
