= Filipinos in Turkey =

Total population
- 5,500

Languages
- Tagalog · other languages of the Philippines · English · Turkish

Religion
- Sunni Islam, minority Roman Catholicism

Related ethnic groups
- Overseas Filipinos

There were 5,500 Filipinos in Turkey as of 2008, according to estimates by the Commission on Filipinos Overseas and the Philippine embassy in Ankara. Out of those, most are recorded as maids and "overseas workers" employed in households of diplomatic communities and elite Turkish families. Moreover, ten percent or approximately 500 Filipinos in Turkey are skilled workers and professionals working as engineers, architects, doctors and teachers. Most of the Filipinos reside in Istanbul, Ankara, Izmir, Antalya and nearby surrounding areas.

== See also ==
- Philippines–Turkey relations
- Filipino diaspora
- Immigration to Turkey
