= Consulate General of the Philippines, Istanbul =

Diplomatic mission of the Philippines in Istanbul, Turkey

Consulate General of the Philippines, Istanbul Konsulado Panlahat ng Pilipinas sa Istanbul Filipinler'in İstanbul Başkonsolosluğu

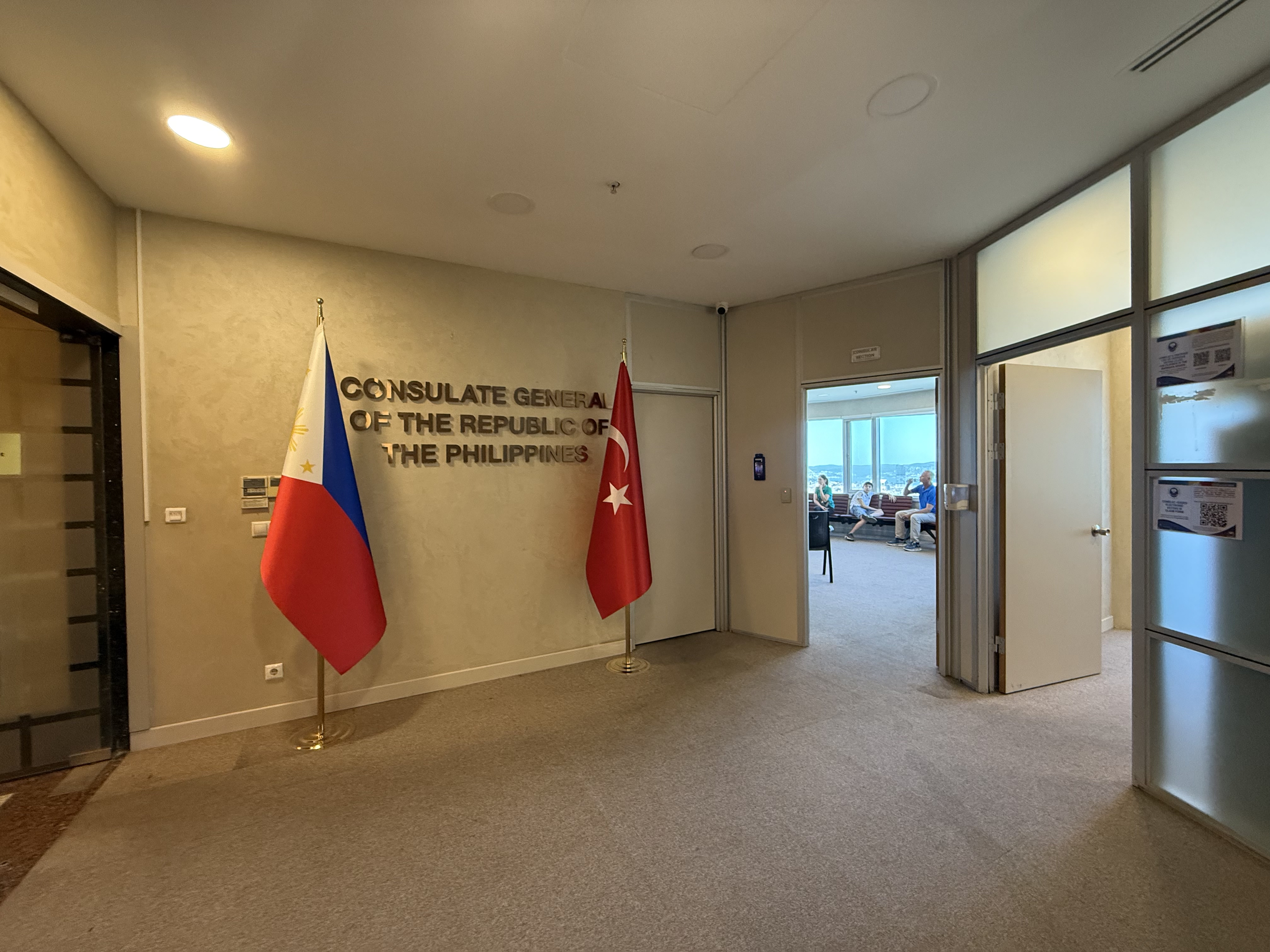
- Location: Istanbul
- Address: Büyükdere Caddesi, No:171, 1. Levent, Şişli
- Coordinates: 41°4′33.3″N 29°0′43.2″E
- Consul General: Christina Gracia V. Rola-McKernan
- Website: istanbulpcg.dfa.gov.ph

The Consulate General of the Philippines in Istanbul is a diplomatic mission of the Republic of the Philippines in Turkey, representing the country's interests in the Marmara region. Opened in 2020, it is located on the thirteenth floor of the MetroCity AVM complex on Büyükdere Avenue in the neighborhood of 1. Levent, part of Şişli in the central business district of Istanbul.

== History ==
Plans for a resident Philippine consulate in Istanbul were first announced during the presidency of Rodrigo Duterte, when Teodoro Locsin Jr., Secretary of the Department of Foreign Affairs (DFA), announced during the inauguration of the new chancery of the Philippine Embassy in Berlin on February 19, 2019 that Istanbul was one of a number of cities the Philippine government was looking to open new missions in. The Philippine Embassy in Ankara, acting on instructions from the DFA, then issued a note verbale requesting permission from the Turkish government to open a resident Philippine consulate in Istanbul on October 2, 2019, which it granted nearly three weeks later.

The first resident Philippine diplomats assigned to Istanbul arrived in the city on December 23, 2019, with the consulate general opening on January 2, 2020. Arvin R. de Leon, at the time serving as deputy chief of mission at the Philippine Embassy in New Delhi, was subsequently appointed as the Philippines' first resident consul general in Istanbul, assuming his post on December 4, 2020.

== Chancery ==
The chancery of the Philippine Consulate General in Istanbul was initially located in Esentepe, part of Şişli, on the sixth floor of the Kanyon Shopping Mall's office tower on Büyükdere Avenue. On August 29, 2020, it announced that the chancery had relocated to MetroCity, two buildings down the street.

On August 24, 2022, the consulate released bidding documents indicating that it was looking to relocate the chancery to a new office, preferably in Levent, with at least 720 square meters (7,800 sq ft) of space and with an approved budget of $144,000 a year for rent.

== Staff and activities ==
The Philippine Consulate General in Istanbul is headed by Consul General Christina Gracia V. Rola-McKernan, who assumed the position on September 19, 2025. Prior to her appointment as consul general, Rola-McKernan, a career diplomat, most recently served as the DFA's acting deputy undersecretary for the Office of Civilian Security and Consular Affairs, and prior to that served as consul at the Philippine Embassy in Paris.

The consulate's jurisdiction covers the eleven provinces of the Marmara region, with some 5,000 Filipinos living within its service area. Since its opening many of its activities involve promoting the deepening cultural and economic ties between the Philippines and Turkey within the region, including organizing a culinary diplomacy event promoting Filipino cuisine, visiting important economic institutions, and arranged for the lighting up of the Fatih Sultan Mehmet and Yavuz Sultan Selim Bridges in the colors of the Philippine flag.

== See also ==
- List of diplomatic missions of the Philippines
- List of diplomatic missions in Turkey
