= Philippines–Turkey relations =

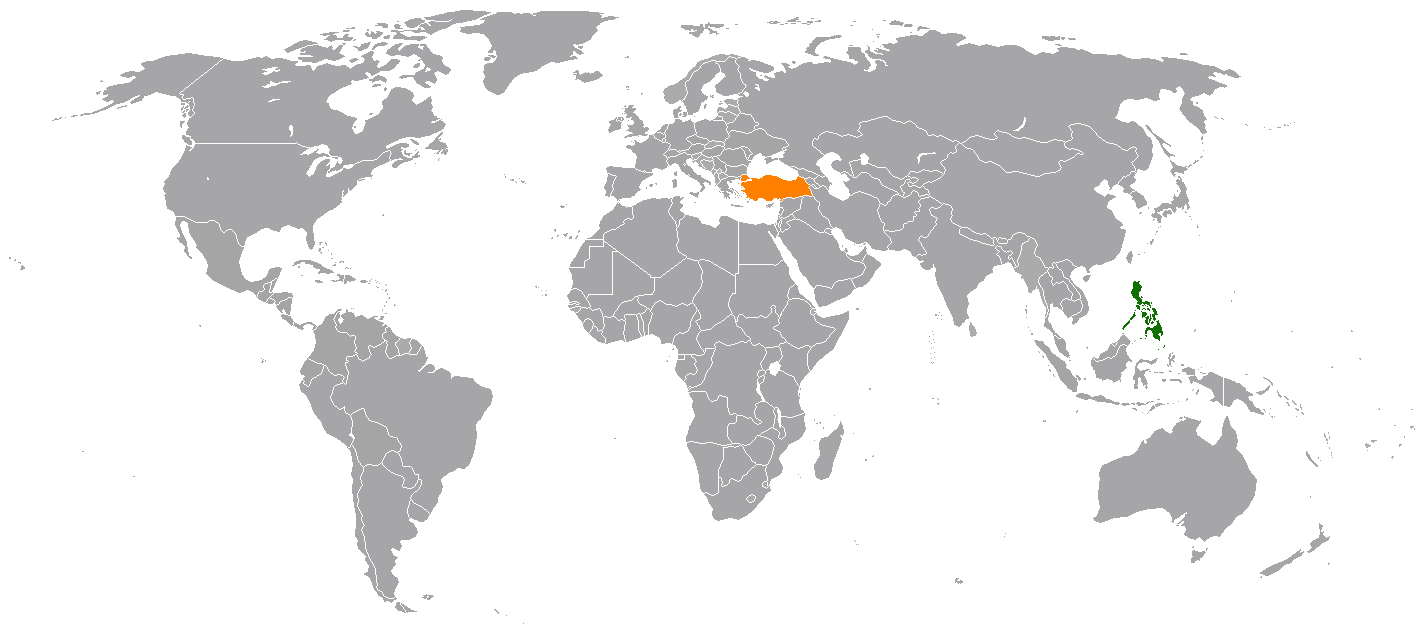

- Philippines: Turkey

The Philippines–Turkey relations are the bilateral relations between the Republic of the Philippines and the Republic of Türkiye. The Philippines has an embassy in Ankara and a consulate general in Istanbul, while Turkey has an embassy in Manila.

== History ==
The Turkish people and Filipinos had relations even before the establishment of the modern nations of Turkey and the Philippines. During Ottoman times people from Luzon, Philippines (Lucoes) were employed by the Turkish. The nephew of the Ottoman Viceroy to Egypt, admiral Heredim Mafamede employed Lucoes in the war against the Portuguese in the Indian Ocean since they appointed one Lucoes named Sapetu Diraja as commander of the Muslim forces over in Aceh, Sumatra, their vassal-state in Southeast Asia. The Lucoes were a partially Islamized people with dual allegiance to Portugal as one was also appointed as administrator in Portuguese-Malacca (Regimo Diraja), as well as Turkey, since some were employed in the Ottoman Caliphate's armies in the Orient, consequently, both fighting with and against Muslims. Pigafetta notes that one of them was in command of the Brunei fleet in 1521. However, the Lucoes shifted their allegiance to Spain (An enemy of the Ottomans) after their homeland, Luzon island, was invaded by Spaniards who had sailed from Latin America. The Spanish together with their Visayan and Latin American soldiers supported the non-Muslim faction in Luzon, Pagan-Hindu Tondo against Muslim Manila, to cement their hold in the archipelago against Muslim interests. Until their eventual war of independence against Spain, the colony of the Philippines was generally hostile to Turkish interests.

Formal diplomatic relations between the two countries were established on June 13, 1949, on a nonresidence basis with the signing of a Treaty of Friendship. Turkey established its resident embassy in Manila in 1990 with Erhan Yigitbasioglu as the first resident ambassador. The Philippines established its resident embassy in Ankara in October 1991 with Bonifacio Pobre Arribas as the first resident ambassador. Turkey also established an honorary consulate in Cebu in 1992.

== Diplomatic visits ==
Then-Philippine President Fidel V. Ramos made a state visit to Turkey in February 1995. Then-Turkish President Süleyman Demirel also made a state visit to the Philippines in February 1999. Then-Philippine President Gloria Macapagal Arroyo also made a state visit to Turkey in September 2009. Turkish Prime Minister Ahmet Davutoğlu travelled to Manila for an official visit in November 2014 to discuss with the peace process with Bangsamoro and threats posed by the Islamic State with President Benigno Aquino III.

== Economic relations ==
=== Turkish flour trade to the Philippines ===
Allegations were raised in 2013 that Turkish flour exporters has been dumping Turkish flour to the Philippines against World Trade Organization policy. Turkish flour was reported to be exported to the Philippines from Turkey at a lower price compared to Philippine local flour.

Philippine Association of Flour Millers (PAFMIL) has petitioned the Philippine Department of Agriculture to raise tariff on Turkish flour from 7 percent to 20 percent. The proposal was opposed by the Filipino-Chinese Bakery Association, who claimed that small bakeries won't cope up with increase operational cost. PAFMIL claims that during the November 2012 period, Turkish flour was sold in the Philippines for $348 per metric ton against a domestic price of $470 per MT.

Turkish flour exporters, Turkish Flour, Yeast and Ingredients rejected the dumping claims and said that it will fight for it rights.

== Security relations ==
The Philippines has no extradition treaty with Turkey.

Turkey is supportive to the resolution of the Moro conflict and was involved in the peace talks of the Philippine government with the Moro Islamic Liberation Front (MILF) as part of the International Contact Group which is composed of representations from three other countries and four international non-governmental organizations. Turkey is part of the Independent Decommissioning Body (IDB) which oversees the decommissioning of MILF's armed forces. A Turkish organization is also a member of the Third Party Monitoring Team which is tasked to oversee the implementation of all agreements between the Philippine government and the MILF.

Turkish companies were involved in the upgrading six armored personnel carriers of the Philippine Army.

== Filipinos in Turkey ==
As of 2013, There are about 5,000 Filipinos in Turkey mostly working as fishermen and domestic helpers. According to a US study. Filipinos among Russians and Africans are one of the fastest growing minorities in Turkey due to the country's improving economic performance.

== See also ==
- Foreign relations of the Philippines
- Foreign relations of Turkey
- List of ambassadors of the Philippines to Turkey
- List of ambassadors of Turkey to the Philippines
