= List of diplomatic missions in Seattle =

This is a list of diplomatic missions in Seattle. Many foreign governments have established diplomatic and trade representation in the city of Seattle. Seattle has some consulate-general offices that are directly linked to Asia.

== Consulates general and honorary consulates in Seattle ==
Country	Mission	Address	Neighborhood or town	Image
Austria	Honorary Consulate	16045 36th Ave NE	Lake Forest Park, WA	
Belgium	Honorary Consulate	2200 Alaskan Way, Suite 470	Downtown Seattle	
Brazil	Honorary Consulate			
Bulgaria	Honorary Consulate			
Canada	Consulate-General	1501 4th Avenue #600	Downtown Seattle	
Chile	Honorary Consulate	1705 NE Pacific St. HSB H-405	University of Washington, Seattle	
Croatia	Honorary Consulate	7547 S. Laurel Street	Lakeridge, Seattle	
Cyprus	Honorary Consulate	5555 Lakeview, Suite 200	Kirkland, WA	
Denmark	Honorary Consulate	4702 SW Findlay Street	West Seattle, Seattle	
El Salvador	Consulate-General	615 2nd Avenue #50	Downtown Seattle	
Ethiopia	Honorary Consulate	241 S. Lander St, Suite 109	SoDo, Seattle	
Finland	Honorary Consulate	2122 170th Ave. NE	Bellevue, WA	
France	Honorary Consulate	Overlake Square, 15127 NE 24th St., #555	Redmond, WA	
Germany	Honorary Consulate	4701 SW Admiral Way #130	North Admiral, Seattle	
Guatemala	Consulate-General	18000 International Blvd.	SeaTac	
Honduras	Consulate-General	1107 Southwest Grady Way	Renton	
Hungary	Honorary Consulate	8240 SE 67th Street	Mercer Island, WA	
Iceland	Honorary Consulate			
India	Consulate-General	3101, Western Avenue, Suite 700	Downtown Seattle	
Italy	Honorary Consulate	5107 – 46th Ave. NE	Laurelhurst, Seattle	
Jamaica	Honorary Consulate	17414 - 156th Place S.E.	Renton, WA	
Japan	Consulate-General	701 Pike Street #1000	Downtown Seattle	
Latvia	Honorary Consulate	13517 69th Avenue S.E.	Snohomish, WA	
Lithuania	Honorary Consulate			
Malta	Honorary Consulate	P.O. Box 1104	Duvall, WA	
Mexico	Consulate-General	807 E. Roy Street	Capitol Hill	
Monaco	Honorary Consulate		Woodinville, WA	
Nepal	Honorary Consulate	16300 Redmond Way, Suite 201	Redmond, WA	
Netherlands	Honorary Consulate			
New Zealand	Honorary Consulate	10502 NE 44th St	Kirkland, WA	
Norway	Honorary Consulate	1812 Hewitt Ave, Suite 211	Everett, WA	
Peru	Consulate General	221 1st W Suite 312 WA-98119	Lower Queen Anne	
Philippines	Consulate General	701 Pike Street, Suite 1510	Downtown Seattle	
Poland	Honorary Consulate	3717 NE 157th St., Suite 100	Laurelhurst, Seattle	
Romania	Honorary Consulate	21426 SE 1st Pl.	Sammamish, WA	
Slovenia	Honorary Consulate	5405 NE 74th Street	View Ridge, Seattle	
South Korea	Consulate-General	115 W. Mercer Street	Lower Queen Anne	
Spain	Honorary Consulate	4709 139th Ave. S.E.	Bellevue, WA	
Sweden	Honorary Consulate	14790 NE 95th Street	Redmond, WA	
Switzerland	Honorary Consulate	6920 94th Ave. SE	Mercer Island, WA	
Taiwan	Economic and Cultural Office	One Union Square, 600 University Street, Suite 2020	Downtown Seattle	
Ukraine	Honorary Consulate	600 1st Ave	Downtown Seattle	
United Kingdom	Consulate-General	Westin Building, 2001 6th Avenue, Suite 2600	Westlake	
