= List of ambassadors of Turkey to the Philippines =

Ambassador of Turkey to the Philippines
- Sugo ng Turkiya sa Pilipinas; Türkiye Filipinler Büyükelçileri
- Incumbent; Niyazi Akyol; Ambassador since September 1, 2022
- Turkish Ministry of Foreign Affairs; Embassy of Turkey, Manila
- Style: His or Her Excellency (formal); Mr. or Madam Ambassador (informal)
- Seat: Makati City, Metro Manila, Philippines
- Appointer: President of Turkey
- Inaugural holder: Erhan Yiğitbaşıoğlu
- Formation: November 1, 1990
- Website: Turkish Embassy, Manila

The ambassador of the Republic of Türkiye to the Republic of the Philippines (Filipino: Sugo ng Republika ng Turkiya sa Republika ng Pilipinas, Turkish: Türkiye Cumhuriyeti Filipinler Cumhuriyeti Büyükelçileri) is Republic of Türkiye's foremost diplomatic representative in the Philippines. As head of Turkey's diplomatic mission there, the ambassador is the official representative of the president and the government of Turkey to the president and government of the Philippines.

Although the diplomatic relations between the two countries were established in 1949, the Turkish embassy in the Philippines was established on October 17, 1990.

== Heads of mission ==
Head of mission	Tenure	Note(s)
Erhan Yiğitbaşıoğlu	November 11, 1990 – June 1, 1994	
Erdinç Erdün	June 15, 1994 – June 1, 1998	
Veka İnal	June 15, 1998 – June 1, 2002	
Tanju Sümer	June 15, 2002 – June 1, 2006	
Adnan Başağa	June 15, 2006 – June 1, 2010	
Hatice Pınar	May 5, 2010 – October 15, 2014	
Esra Cankorur	January 31, 2014 – February 1, 2019	
Artemiz Sümer	February 1, 2019 – September 1, 2022	Credentials were presented to Rodrigo Duterte on March 19, 2019.
Niyazi Akyol	September 1, 2022 – present	Credentials were presented to Bongbong Marcos on October 13, 2022.
Source: Embassy of the Republic of Turkey, Manila

== See also ==
- Foreign relations of the Philippines
- Foreign relations of Turkey
- List of ambassadors of the Philippines to Turkey
