= Embassy of the Philippines, Ankara =

Diplomatic mission of the Philippines in Turkey

Embassy of the Philippines, Ankara Pasuguan ng Pilipinas sa Ankara Filipinler'in Ankara Büyükelçiliği

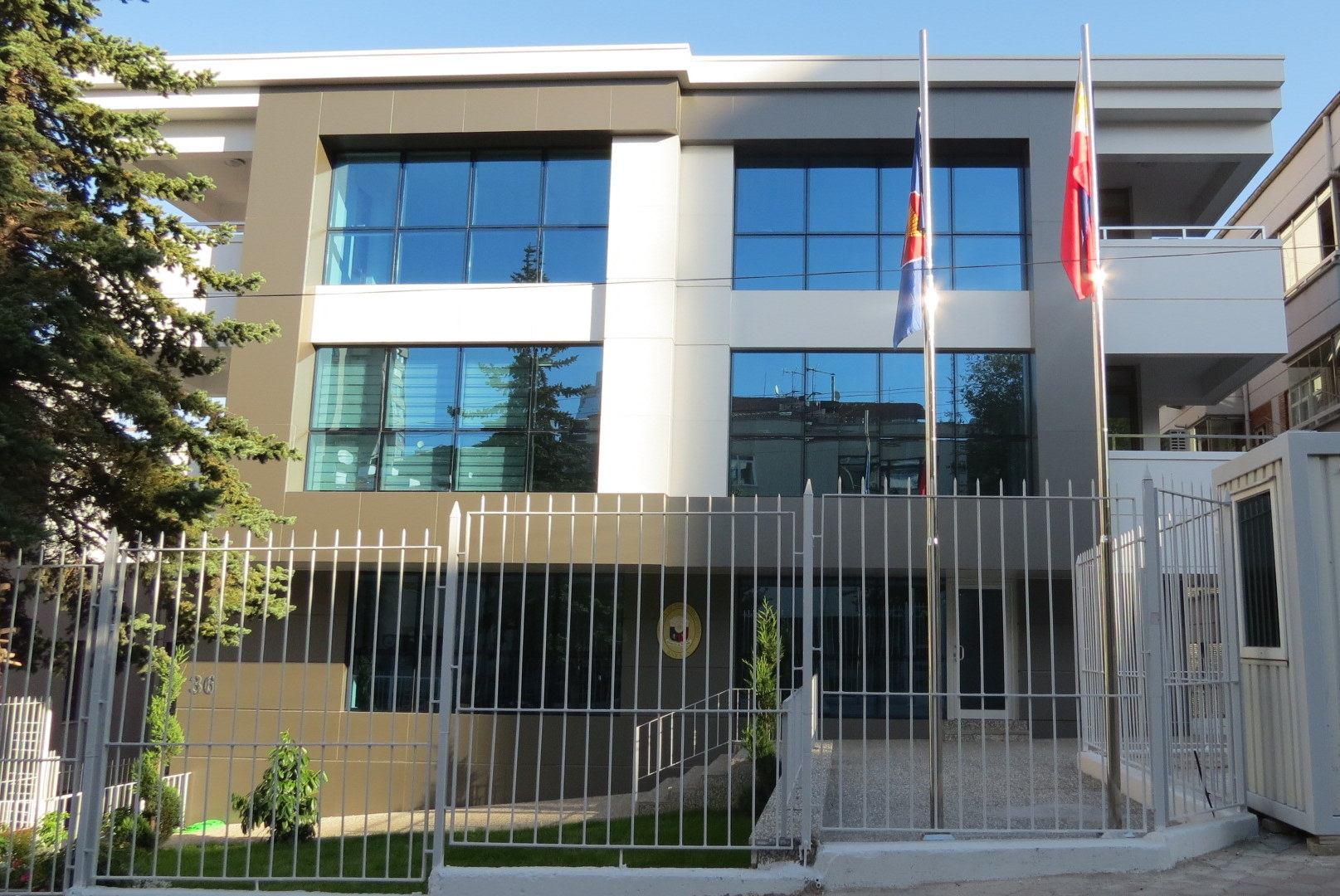
- Location: Ankara
- Address: Kazım Özalp Mahallesi, Kumkapı Sokak, No:36, Çankaya District
- Coordinates: 39°53′14.9″N 32°52′25.1″E
- Ambassador: Jaime Ramon T. Ascalon
- Website: ankarape.dfa.gov.ph

The Embassy of the Philippines in Ankara is the diplomatic mission of the Republic of the Philippines to the Republic of Türkiye (Turkey). Opened in 1991, it is located in the Kazım Özalp neighborhood of the Çankaya District in central Ankara, near the Atatürk Museum Mansion and the Çankaya Mansion.

== History ==
Although the Philippines and Turkey established diplomatic relations on June 13, 1949, relations between the two countries were historically conducted through other missions, most recently the Philippine Embassy in Tehran which assumed jurisdiction over Turkey in 1975. An honorary consulate headed by Ömer Yalnızoğlu was later opened to represent Philippine interests in Turkey.

The Philippine Embassy in Ankara opened in 1991, following the opening of the Turkish Embassy in Manila the year before. Bonifacio P. Arribas was then appointed as the country's first resident ambassador to Turkey, presenting his credentials to Turkish President Turgut Özal on October 30, 1991.

The embassy was the only Philippine diplomatic mission in Turkey until it, acting on instructions from the Department of Foreign Affairs (DFA), issued a note verbale requesting permission from the Turkish government to open a resident Philippine consulate in Istanbul, the country's largest city, on October 2, 2019. The Turkish government subsequently granted permission nearly three weeks later, and the Philippine Consulate General in Istanbul opened on January 2, 2020.

== Chancery ==
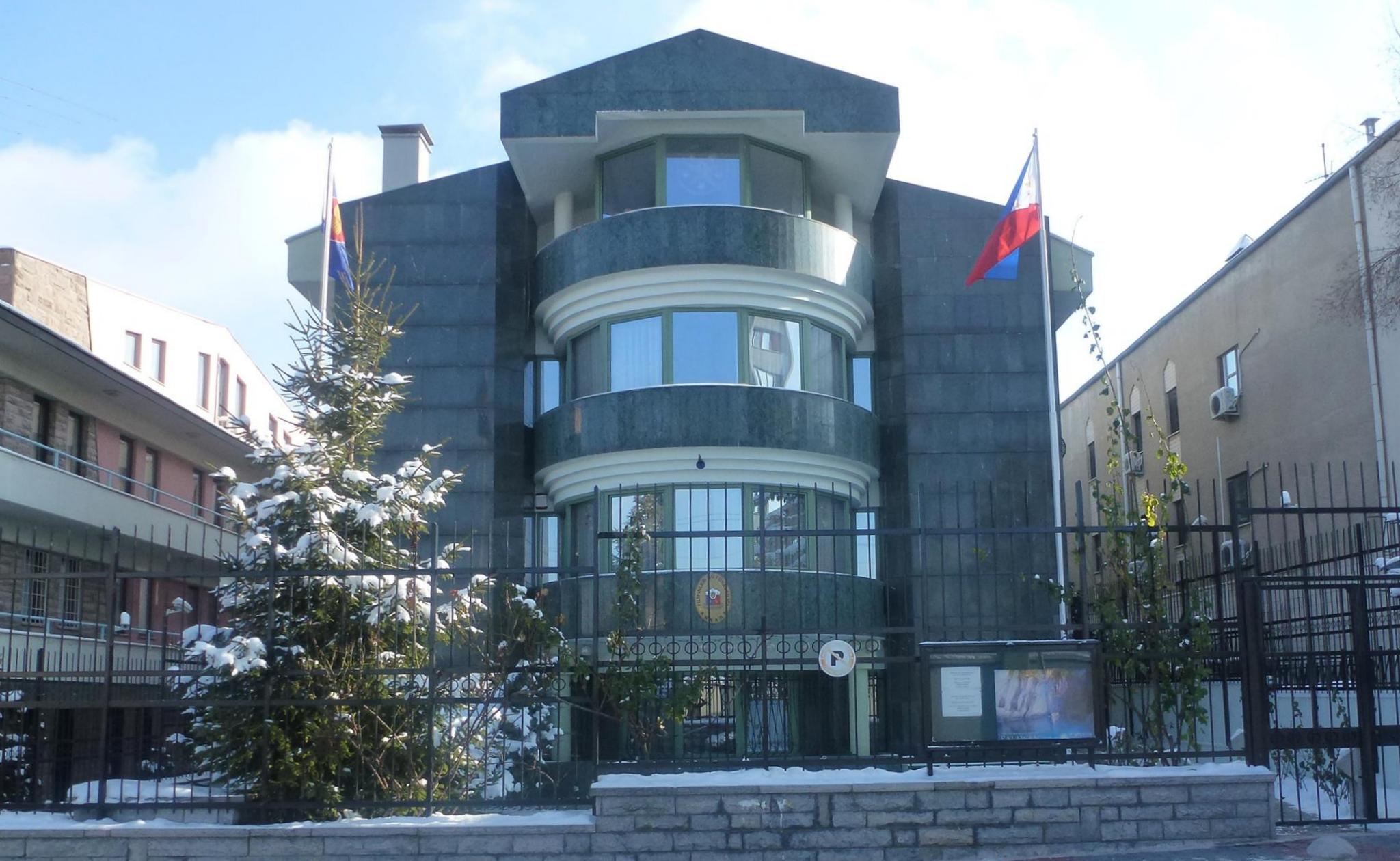
The previous chancery on 56 Mahatma Gandhi Avenue in Büyükesat

Until 2015, the chancery of the Philippine Embassy in Ankara was located on 56 Mahatma Gandhi Avenue in the neighboring Büyükesat neighborhood, across from the Betül Can Anatolian High School.

On August 27, 2015, the embassy announced that it was relocating to a new chancery 950 meters (0.59 mi) to the southwest on Kumkapı Sokak. Opening on September 1, 2015, the new chancery is a five-storey standalone structure initially leased to the Philippine government until December 31, 2020, with the building also containing a basement and parking facilities.

In the 2017–2022 Philippine Development Plan, the Philippine government identified as a priority project the acquisition of a property in Ankara to serve as a permanent chancery, budgeting over ₱300 million for this purpose and assigning the DFA to serve as the implementing agency.

== Staff and activities ==
The Philippine Embassy in Ankara is headed by Ambassador Jaime Ramon T. Ascalon, who was appointed to the position by President Bongbong Marcos on August 13, 2025. Prior to his appointment as ambassador, Ascalon, a career diplomat and former researcher, served as deputy chief of mission at the Philippine Embassy in Washington, D.C. His appointment was confirmed by the Commission on Appointments on September 3, 2025, and he presented his credentials to Turkish President Recep Tayyip Erdoğan on May 7, 2026.

The embassy's activities center around ensuring the welfare of Filipinos in Turkey, especially during natural disasters. After the 2023 Turkey–Syria earthquakes it organized relief efforts for Filipinos in the earthquake zone, conducted evacuations from the zone to Ankara, and facilitated the entry of the country's search and rescue contingent to help in earthquake relief efforts, something which the Turkish government later honored the country for. It is also involved in promoting and deepening cultural, economic and political ties between the Philippines and Turkey, including facilitating educational visits to Turkish higher education institutions, promoting Philippine culture at events such as the Istanbul Biennial, and allowing Filipinos in Turkey to reconnect with Filipino culture through activities such as an annual parol workshop.

Beyond Turkey, the embassy's jurisdiction also includes Azerbaijan and, since 2005, Georgia, with honorary consuls subordinate to the embassy being present in both countries.

== See also ==
- Philippines–Turkey relations
- Filipinos in Turkey
- List of diplomatic missions of the Philippines
