= List of Turkish French people =

The following is a list of notable French Turks, including both original immigrants of full or partial Turkish descent who obtained French citizenship and their French descendants.

Most notable French Turks have come from, or originate from, Turkey but there are also notable French people of Turkish origin who have immigrated from, or descend from, the other former Ottoman territories, especially Turks from the North Africa and the Levant.

== Academia ==
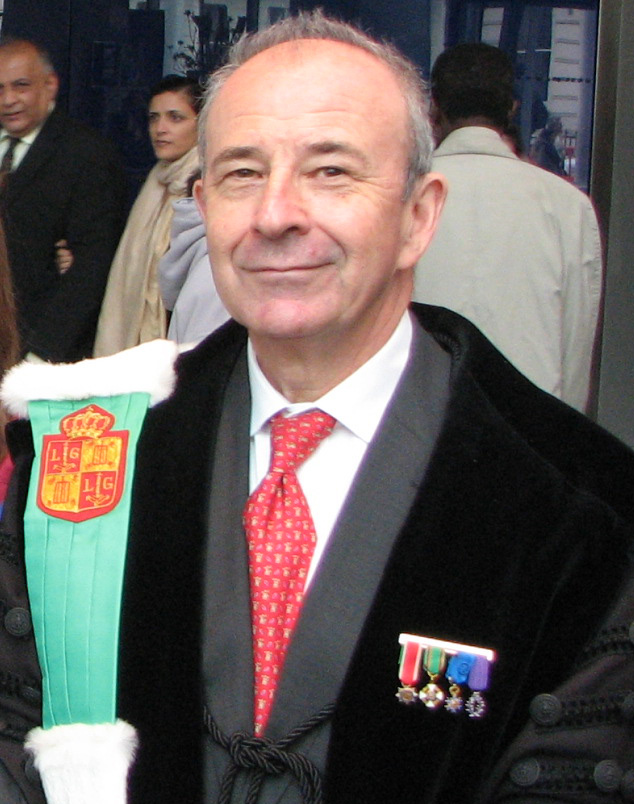
Professor Erol Gelenbe

- Dr Ipek Yalcin Christmann, neurobiologist in charge of research at the French National Centre for Scientific Research
- Deniz Dalkara, molecular biologist and Dalkara is listed as an inventor on multiple patents
- Dr Serdar Dalkılıç, founder of the National Union of Hospital Practitioners (SNPAC) and President of the Franco-Turkish Health Foundation
- Erol Gelenbe, Professor of Electrical and Electronic Engineering at Imperial College
- Nilüfer Göle, Professor of Sociology at the École des Hautes Études en Sciences Sociales;
- Doğan Kuban, Professor of Ottoman Architecture and History at Istanbul Technical University
- Farouk Mardam-Bey, director of the Arab world collections at the French publishing house Actes Sud (Turkish Syrian origin, from the Mardam Bey family)
- Pınar Selek, sociologist and feminist
- Nora Şeni, Professor of History at the Institut français de géopolitique;
- Semih Vaner, founder and president of the "French Association for the Study of the Eastern Mediterranean and the Turkish-Iranian World" (AFEMOTI), Director of the "Study Group on Contemporary Turkey and Iran (ERTCI)", and Director of "Study notebooks on the Eastern Mediterranean and the Turkish-Iranian world" (CEMOTI).

== Arts and literature ==
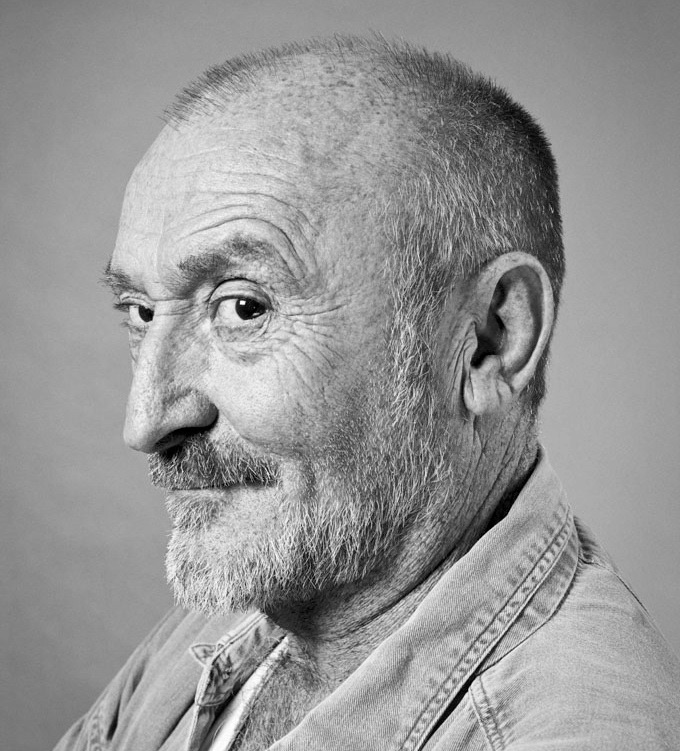
Salih Coskun, sculptor and painter

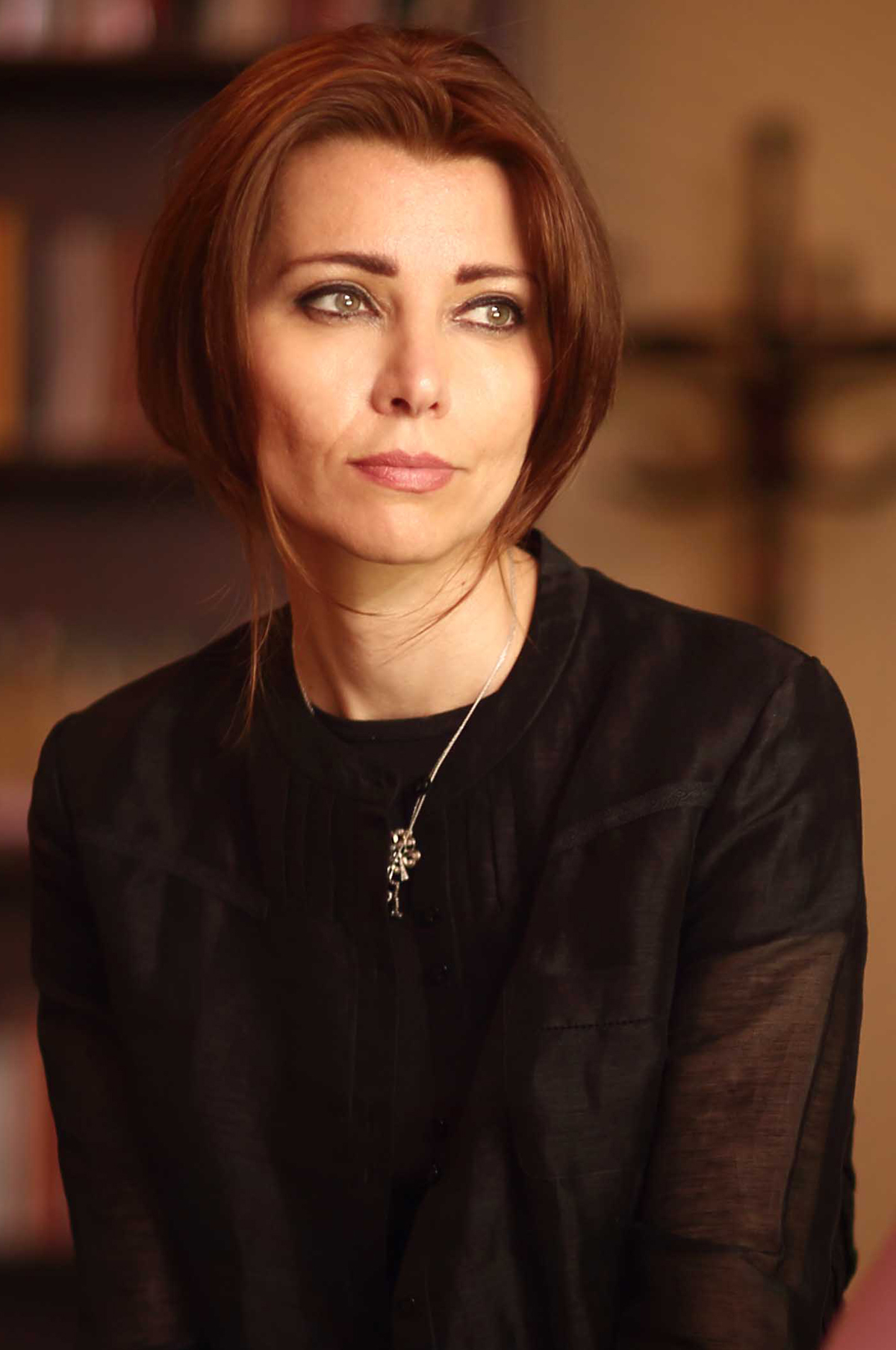
Elif Shafak, writer

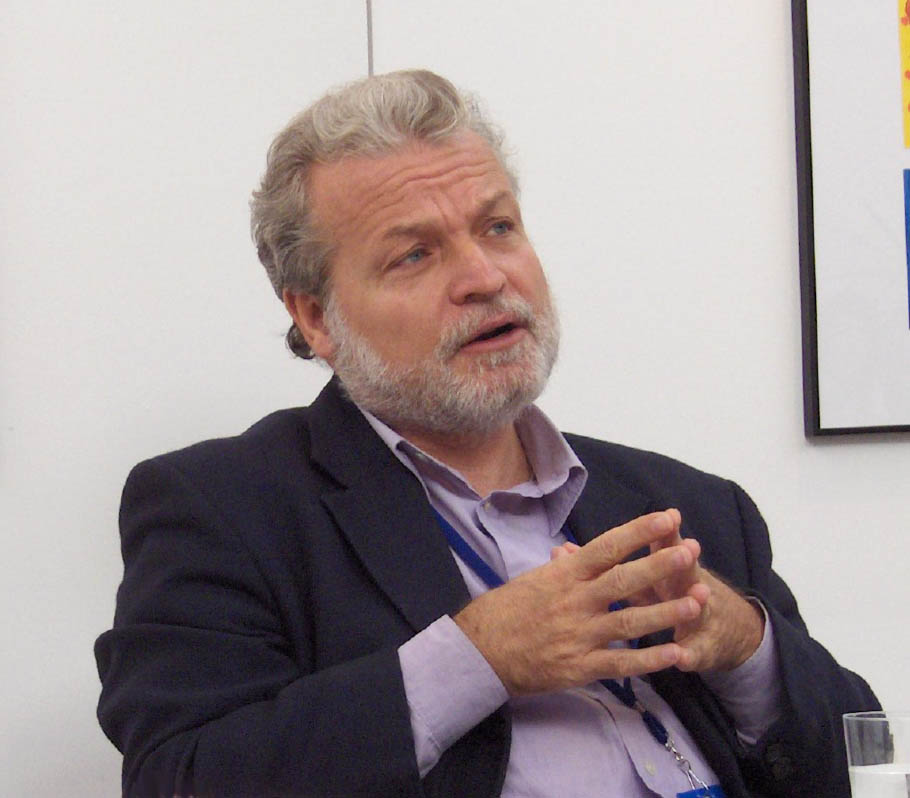
Nedim Gürsel, writer

- Ivan Bunin, writer
- Suela Cennet founder and executive director of The Pill
- Leïla Chellabi, writer (Morocco-born to a Turkish-Algerian father)
- Salih Coskun, sculptor and painter
- Gürkan Coşkun, painter
- Abidin Dino, painter
- Ramize Erer, cartoonist and painter
- Vénus Khoury-Ghata, poet and writer (Turkish-Lebanese origin)
- Yasmine Ghata writer (Turkish-Lebanese origin)
- Nedim Gürsel, novelist who teaches contemporary Turkish literature at the Sorbonne
- Mahir Guven, novelist (Turkish mother)
- Mustapha Haciane, writer (Turkish-Algerian origin)
- Uğur Hüküm, journalist
- Reha Hutin, American-born journalist and President of the 30 millions d'amis foundation
- Seyhan Kurt, poet, writer, anthropologist and sociologist
- Amin Maalouf, author (Lebanese-born to a Turkish-Egyptian mother)
- Nihal Martli, painter
- Kenizé Mourad, novelist who descends from the exiled Ottoman royal family
- Yaman Okur, dancer
- Mourad Salem, artist (Turkish-Tunisian origin)
- Fikret Mualla Saygı, painter
- Leïla Sebbar, writer (Turkish-Algerian through her grandmother)
- Elif Shafak, novelist who was awarded the Ordre des Arts et des Lettres in 2010
- Ayşegül Savaş, writer
- Nil Yalter, contemporary feminist artist (Turkish-Egyptian origin)
- Munis Tekinalp, writer, philosopher, and journalist

== Business ==
- Ali Bourequat, businessman (Moroccan-born to a Turkish-Tunisian father)
- Emad Khashoggi, businessman who initiated the Château Louis XIV development project (Lebanese-born into the Saudi-Turkish Khashoggi family)
- Gökşin Sipahioğlu, photographer who founded the Paris-based photo agency Sipa Press
- Selçuk Yilmaz, businessman and co-owner of the French clothing brand Naf Naf
- Seyfi Yılmaz, businessman and co-owner of the French clothing brand Naf Naf
- Nesime Dogan Gunter, businesswoman and entrepreneur

== Fashion and design ==
- Ayşe Ege, co-founded the Paris-based high fashion brand Dice Kayek
- Ece Ege, co-founded the Paris-based high fashion brand Dice Kayek
- Ali Suna, model and creator of the brand Divercityz
- Yasemin Tordjman, fashion stylist and former wife of Éric Besson (Turkish-Tunisian through her paternal grandfather)

== Film and television ==
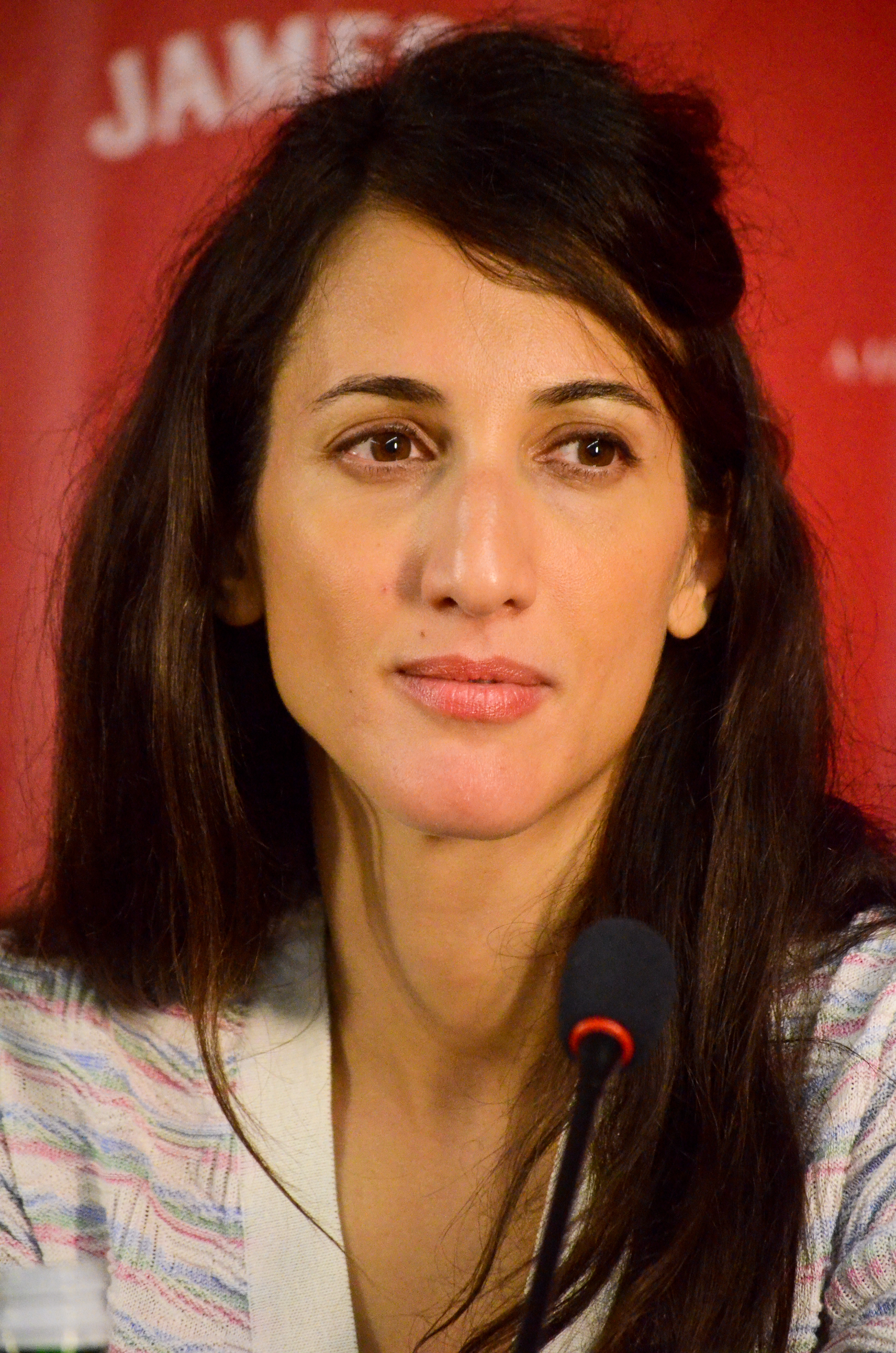
Deniz Gamze Ergüven, film director

- Isabelle Adjani, actress (Turkish-Algerian father)
- Muratt Atik, actor
- Anaïs Baydemir weather presenter on France 2 and France 3
- Ergün Demir, actor
- Cansel Elçin, actor
- Deniz Gamze Ergüven, film director
- Ramin Matin, film director

== Music ==
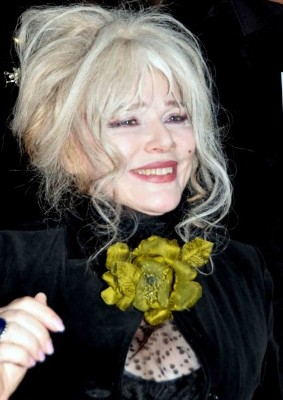
Armande Altaï, singer

- Armande Altaï, singer (Turkish mother from Syria)
- Deniz Arman Gelenbe, pianist and Professor at the Trinity Laban Conservatoire of Music and Dance
- Gülseren, singer who represented Turkey at the Eurovision Song Contest 2005
- Anil Eraslan, cellist
- Mennel Ibtissem, singer and former contestant on The Voice France (Turkish-Syrian father)
- Yilmaz Karaman (Lil maaz), rapper
- MRC, rapper
- Faik Sardag, musician
- Anne Sila, singer
- Serâ Tokay, first conductor of Turkish origin to give a concert at the Carnegie Hall
- Master Turc, singer

== Politics ==
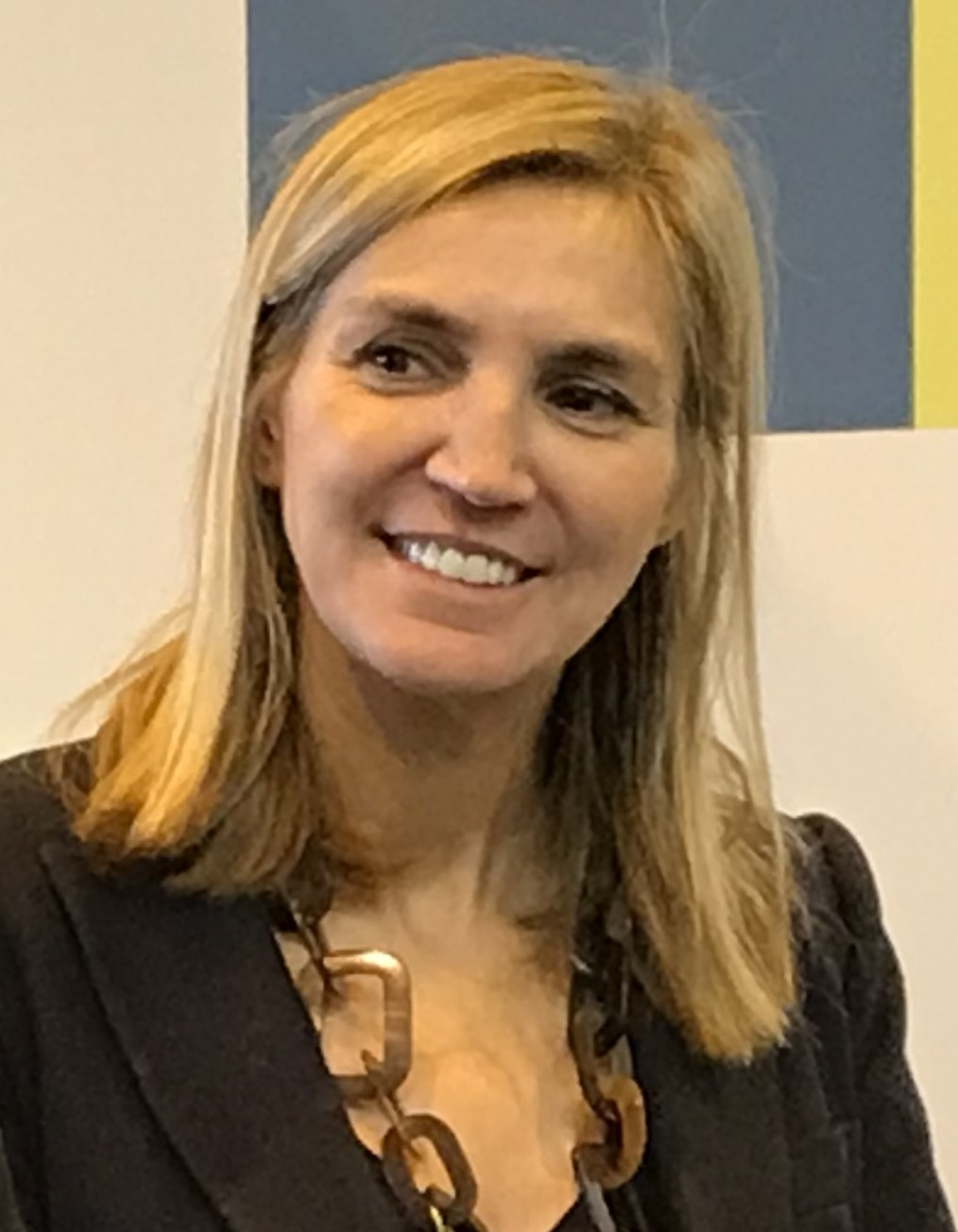
Agnès Evren

- Chérif Sid Cara, politician and doctor (Turkish-Algerian origin)
- Nafissa Sid Cara, the first female minister to serve in the French Fifth Republic as well as the first ever Muslim woman to serve as a minister in a French government (Turkish-Algerian origin)
- Agnès Evren, elected as a Member of the European Parliament in the 2019 election in France,
- Mourad Kaouah, served as the deputy of Algiers from 1958 to 1962 (Turkish-Algerian origin)
- Kaddour Sator, Deputy of Constantine in 1946 (Turkish-Algerian origin)
- Metin Yavuz, elected mayor of Valenton in 2020

== Religion ==
- Domenico Ottomano was an Ottoman-born friar of the Dominican Order
- Ahmet Ogras, the first French-Turk to become President of the French Council of the Muslim Faith in 2017

== Sports ==
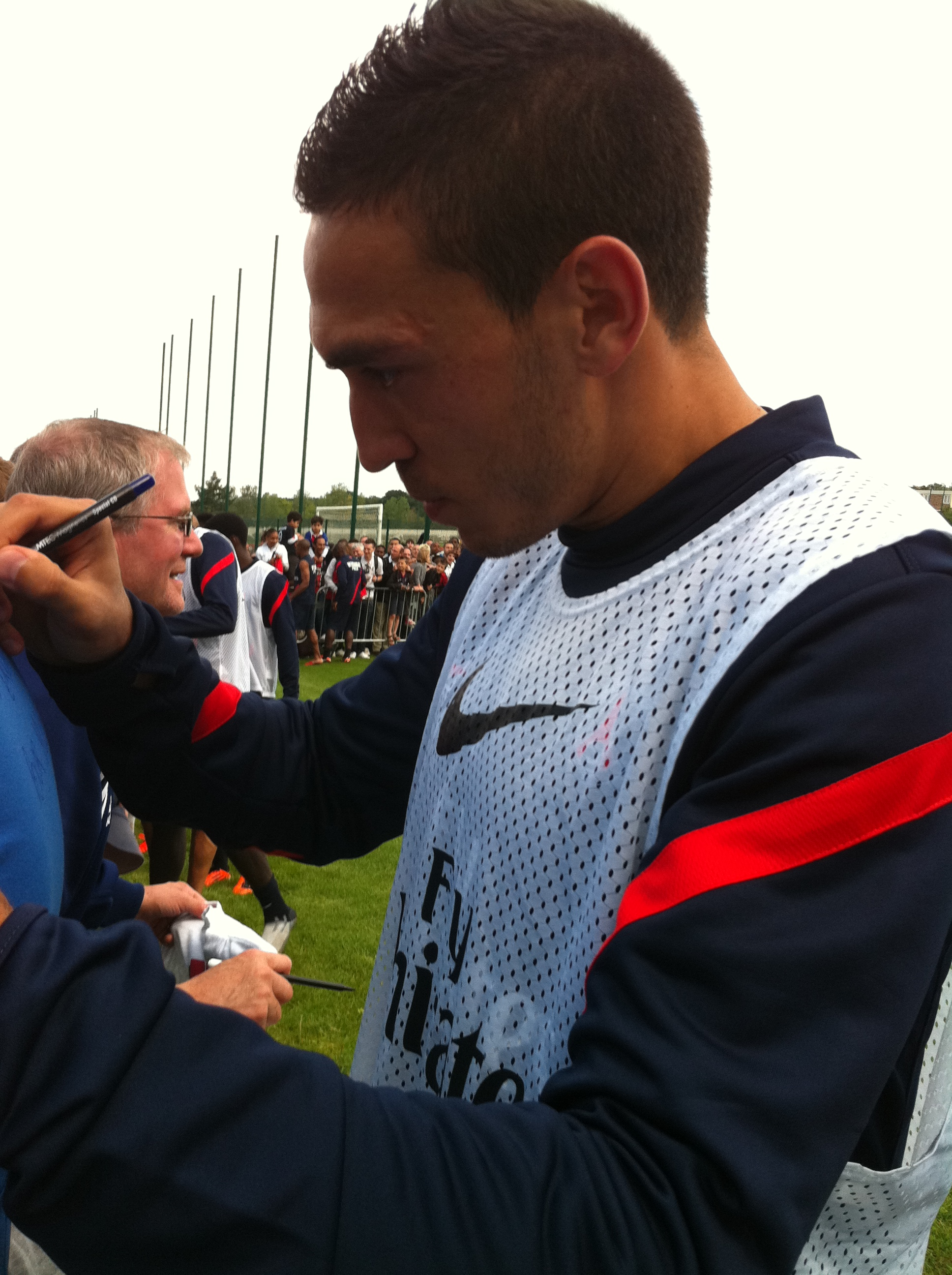
Mevlüt Erdinç

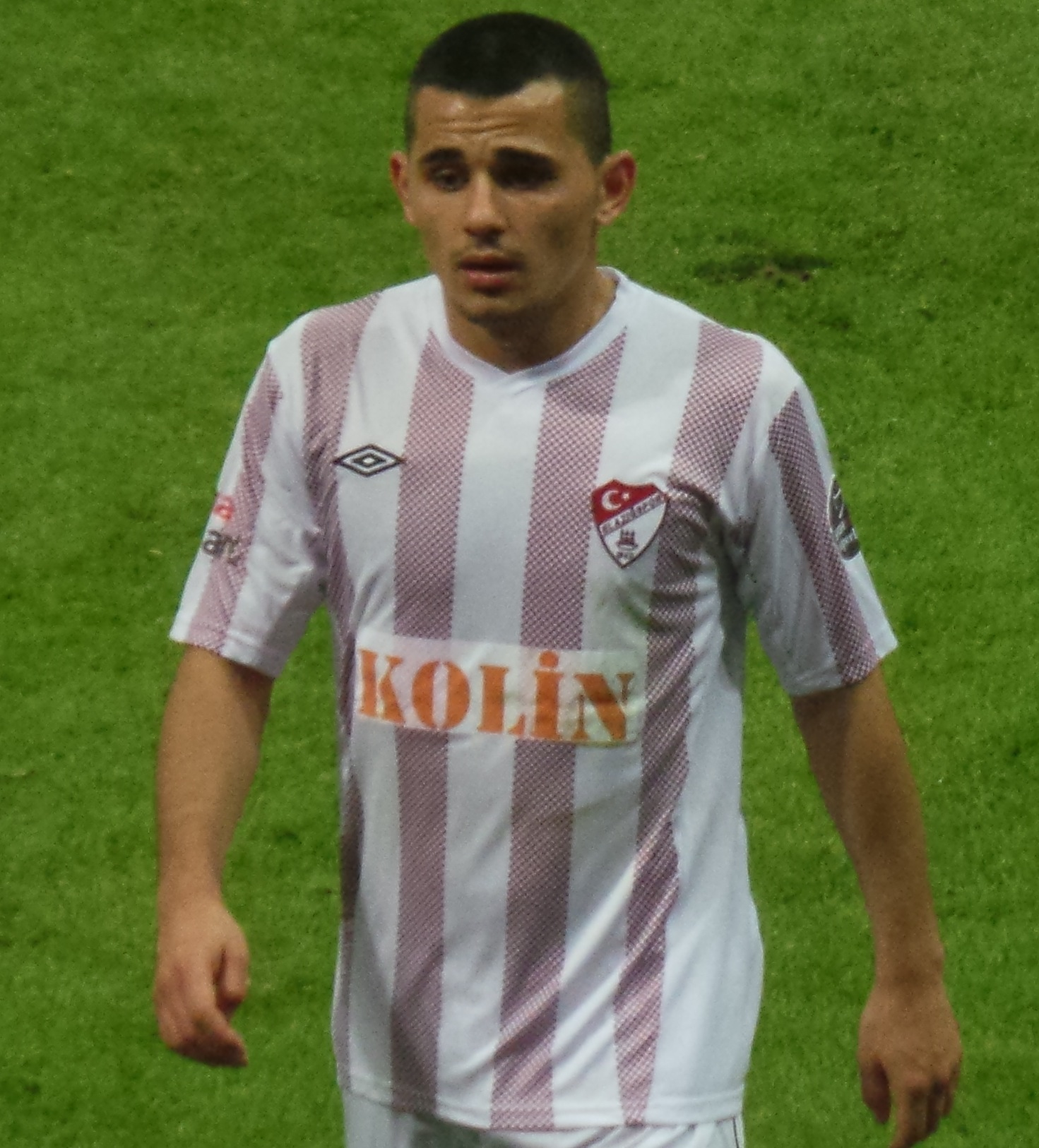
Serdar Gürler

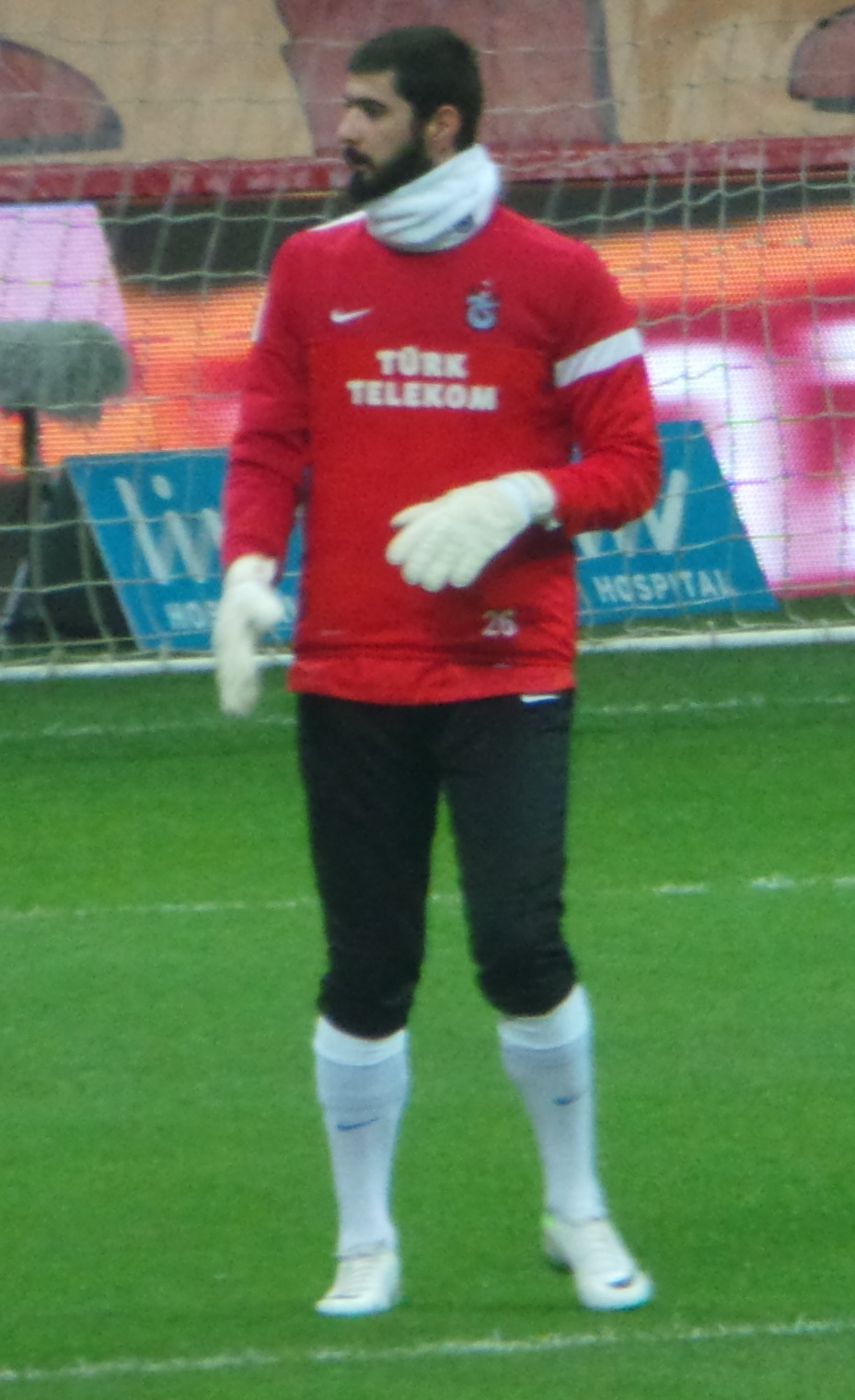
Fatih Öztürk, football player

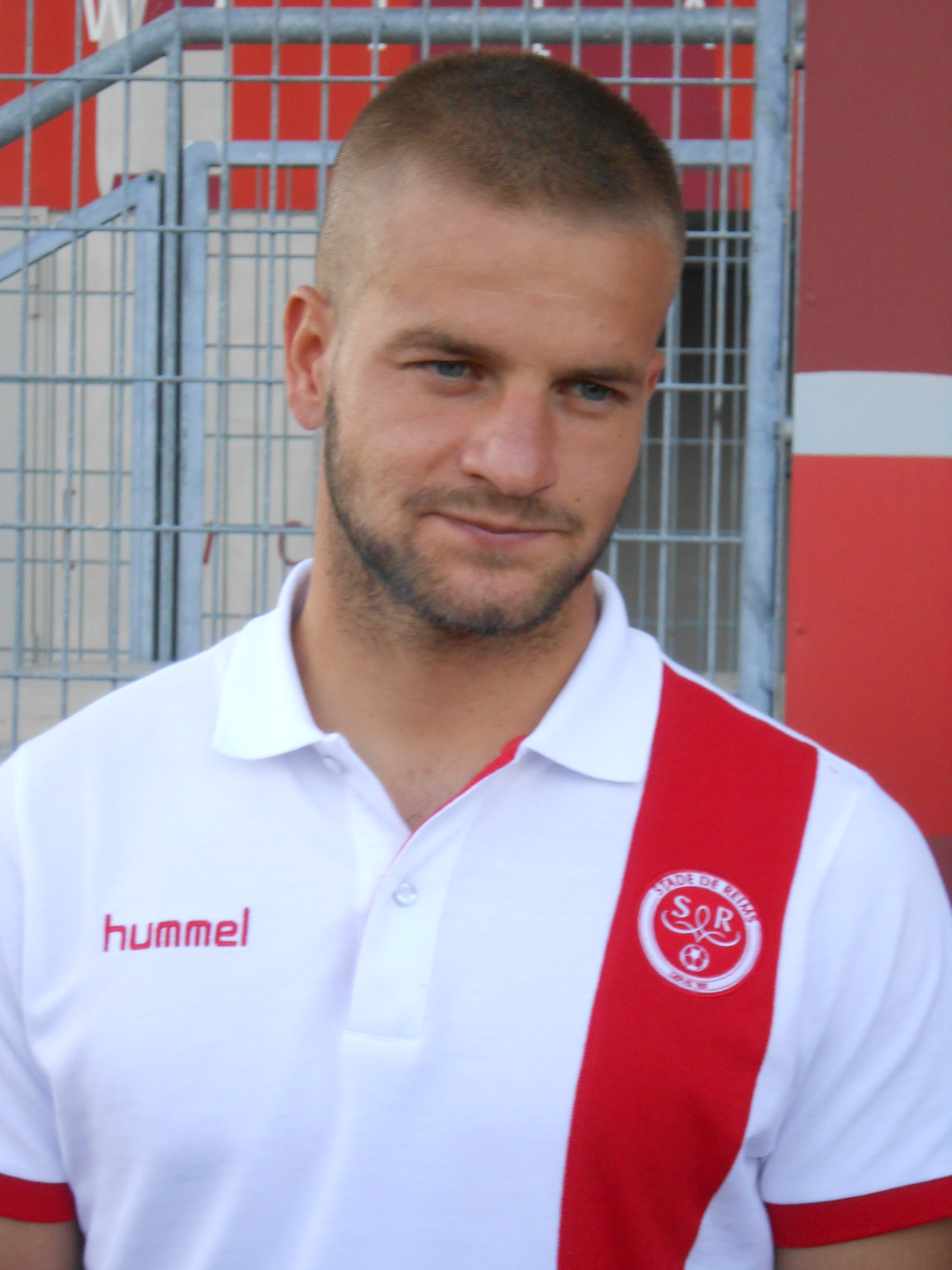
Atila Turan, football player

- Patrick Abada, pole vaulter and Olympian (Turkish-Algerian origin)
- Emre Akbaba, football player
- Aksel Aktas, football player
- Osman Aktas, boxer
- Kubilay Aktaş, football player
- Selen Altunkulak, female football player
- Fatih Atik, football player
- Numan Bostan, football player
- Lucie Bouthors, female basketball player (Turkish mother)
- Umut Bozok, football player
- Ozkan Cetiner, football player
- İbrahim Dağaşan. football player
- Mustafa Durak, football player
- Mevlüt Erdinç, football player
- Ayhan Güçlü, football player
- Metehan Güçlü, football player
- Ender Günlü, football player
- Serdar Gürler, football player
- Selim Ilgaz, football player
- Burak Kardeş, football player
- İpek Kaya, female football player
- Samed Kılıç, football player
- Özer Özdemir, football player
- Sinan Özkan, football player
- Hakan Özmert, football player
- Fatih Öztürk, football player
- Yusuf Sari, football player
- Benjamin Stambouli, football player (Turkish-Algerian through his great-grandfather)
- Henri Stambouli, football player (Turkish-Algerian through his grandfather)
- Servan Taştan, football player
- Atila Turan, football player
- Kendal Ucar, football player
- Sabahattin Usta, football player
- Serkan Yanık football player
- Maurice Zilber was a thoroughbred horse trainer

== Other ==
- Prince Mukarram Jah, French-born Head of the House of Nizam of Hyderabad (Turkish mother)
- Princess Niloufer, Ottoman princess
- Marie Tepe, vivandière who fought for the Union army during the American Civil War

== See also ==
- Turks in France
- List of French people
