= Turks in France =

Ethnic group

Turks in France Fransa'daki Türkler Diaspora turque en France
Total population
- 600,000 - 1 million

Regions with significant populations
- Alsace; Bordeaux; Lille; Lyon; Saint-Étienne; Lorraine; Marseille; Paris; Strasbourg; Orléans; Grenoble; Clermont-Ferrand; Annecy; Avignon; Nice; Besançon; L'Argentière-la-Bessée; Sainte-Sigolène; Albertville; Les Abrets en Dauphiné

Languages
- French, Turkish; (Arabic spoken by Turkish Algerians and Turkish Tunisians; Bulgarian spoken by Turkish Bulgarians, etc.)

Religion
- Predominantly Sunni Islam; Minority Alevism, Christianity, other religions, or irreligious

Turks in France also called the Turkish-French community, French Turks or Franco-Turks (French: Turcs de France; Turkish: Fransa'daki Türkler) refers to the ethnic Turkish people who live in France. The majority of French Turks descend from the Republic of Turkey; however there has also been Turkish migration from other post-Ottoman countries including ethnic Turkish communities which have come to France from North Africa (especially Algeria and Tunisia), the Balkans (e.g. from Bulgaria, Greece, Kosovo, North Macedonia and Romania), the island of Cyprus, and more recently Iraq, Lebanon, and Syria. There has also been migration to France from the Turkish diaspora (i.e. from states outside former Ottoman territories, such as Morocco and Western Europe)

== History ==
=== Early Ottoman migration ===
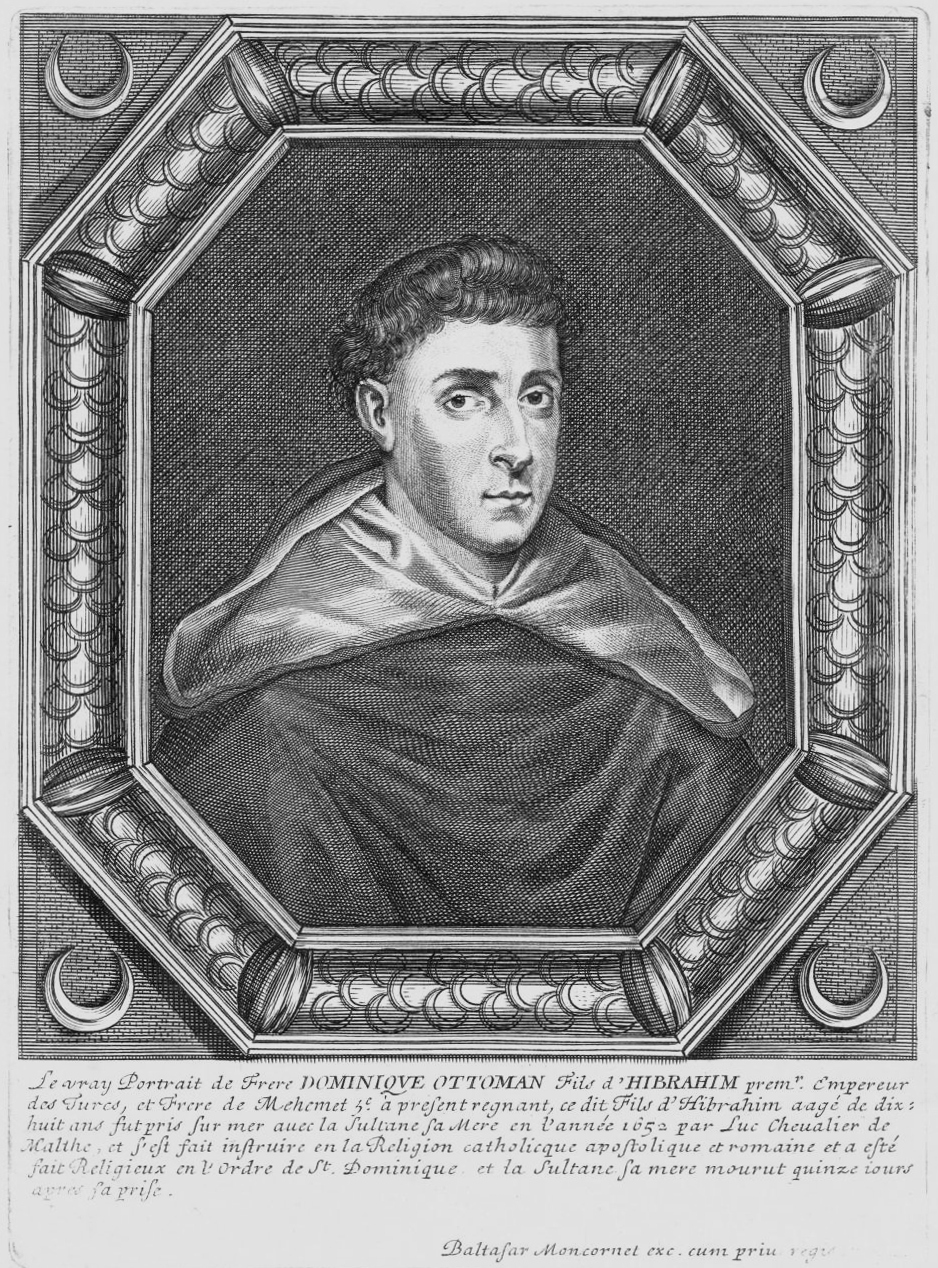
Domenico Ottomano was an Ottoman-born friar of the Dominican Order

The first Turks settled in France during the 16th and 17th century as galley slaves and merchants from the Ottoman Empire; the historian Ina Baghdiantz McCabe has described Marseille as a "Turkish town" during this time. According to Jean Marteilhe "…the Turks of Asia and Europe...of whom there are a great many in the galley of France, who have been made slaves by the Imperialists, and sold to the French to man their galleys… are generally well-made, fair in feature, wise in their conduct, zealous in the observance of their religion, honourable and charitable in the highest degree. I have seen them give away all the money they possessed to buy a bird in a cage that they might have the pleasure of giving it its liberty".

=== Turkish migration from the Republic of Turkey ===
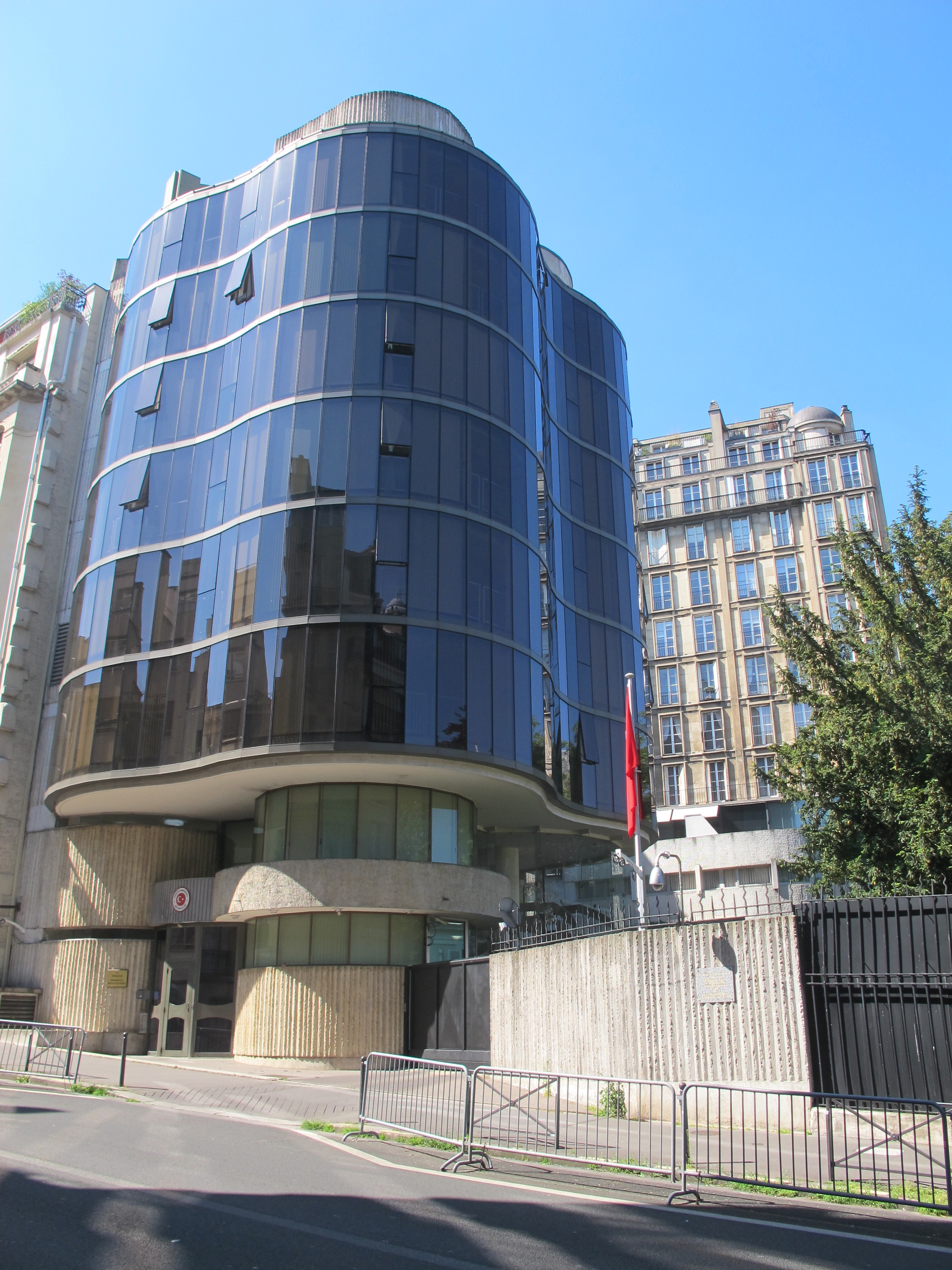
Turkish Embassy in Paris, France

France signed a bilateral labour recruitment agreement with Turkey on 8 May 1965 because the number of entrants from other countries such as Italy, Spain and Portugal was not sufficient. By 1975 there were 55,710 Turkish workers living in France, this had almost quadrupled to 198,000 in 1999. The majority of Turkish immigrants came from rural areas of Turkey, especially from central Anatolia.

Whilst the majority of Turkish immigrants came during the recruitment agreement, many also came much earlier. For example, even in areas with fewer immigration waves, Cholet had an established Turkish community since 1945.

=== Turkish migration from other post-Ottoman countries ===
Whilst the majority of French Turks originate from the modern borders of the Republic of Turkey, there are also significant Turkish-Algerian and Turkish-Tunisian communities which arrived in the France once the Ottoman rule ended with the French colonization of North Africa as well as some who arrived after the formation of the modern borders of Algeria and Tunisia.

Furthermore, there are also smaller numbers of Turkish communities which have arrived to France from the Balkans (e.g. Bulgarian Turks and Western Thrace Turks) whilst Turkish Cypriots have come from both the Republic of Cyprus and the Turkish Republic of Northern Cyprus. More recently, since the European migrant crisis started in 2014, Iraqi Turks and Syrian Turks have also come to France.

== Demographics ==
French Turks protesting in Paris

The majority of Turks are mainly concentrated in eastern France. There is a strong Turkish presence in Île-de-France (especially in Paris), Nord-Pas-de-Calais (mainly in the cities of Calais, Lille, and Roubaix), Rhône-Alpes (especially in Lyon), Alsace (mainly in Strasbourg) and Lorraine. There is also a large community in Marseille.

The 10th arrondissement of Paris is steeped with Turkish culture and is often called "La Petite Turquie" (Little Turkey).

In addition to living in the biggest French cities, there are also large Turkish communities in smaller towns and villages. Bischwiller, in Alsace, is often dubbed "Turkwiller" due to its large Turkish community. The Turks also make up approximately 15% of the population in Châteaubriant (2014 est.) and 17% of the population in Flers.

=== Population ===
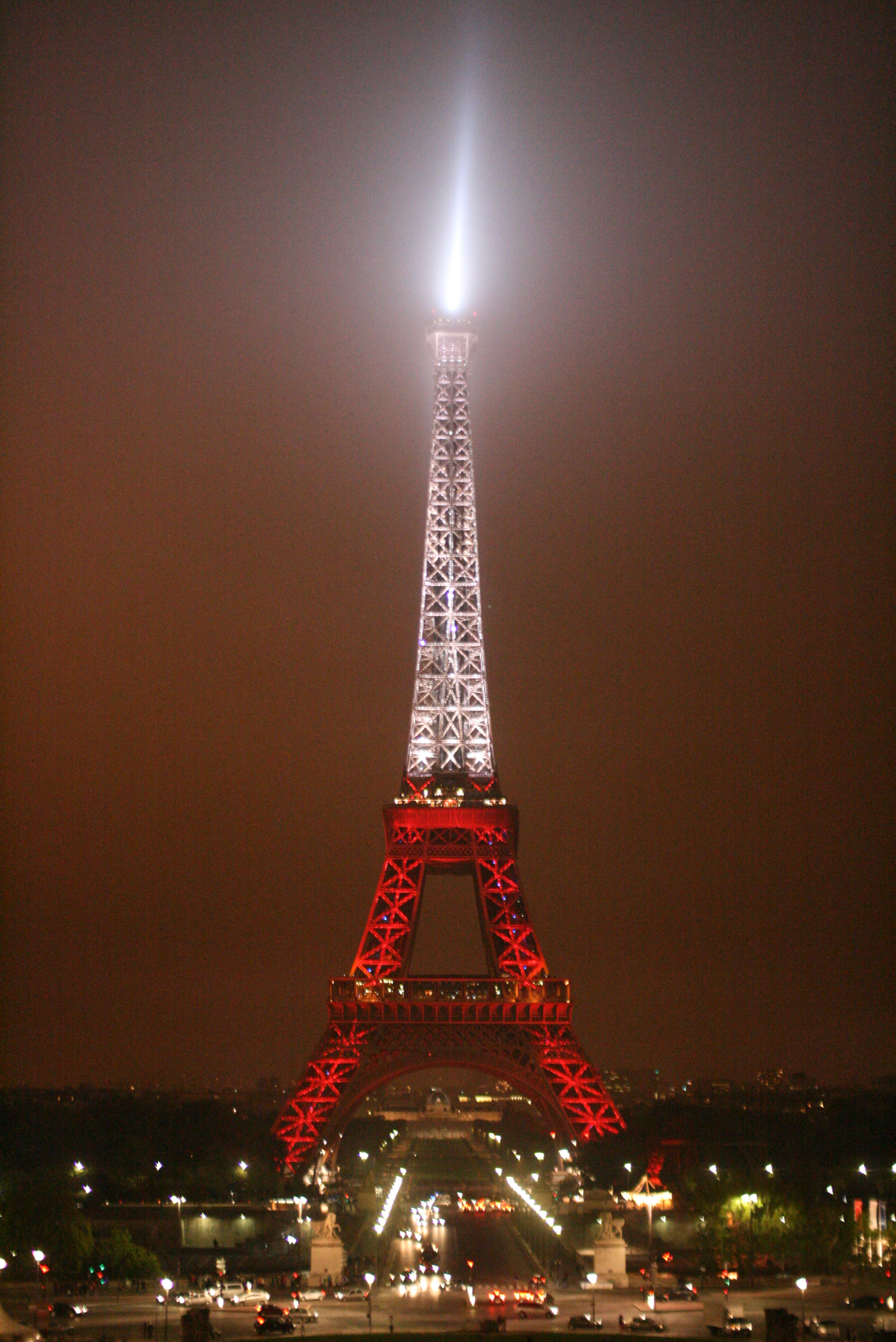
The Eiffel Tower in Paris wearing the colours of the Turkish flag during the "Saison de la Turquie en France"

Official data on the total number of French Turks is not available because the French census only records statistics on the country of birth rather than one's ethnic affiliation. Numerous estimates since the 2010s placed the Turkish-French population at around 1 million, or over 1 million. By 2020 estimates have continued to suggest more than 1 million to as much as 1.9 million French Turks.

As early as 2002, Professor Remy Leveau and Professor Shireen T. Hunter said that official statistics on the Turkish community "may be too small" and had estimated the number of Turks to be 500,000. By 2014 Professor Pierre Vermeren reported in L'Express that the Turkish population was around 800,000. However, an earlier report by Dr Jean-Gustave Hentz and Dr Michel Hasselmann in 2010 had already estimated that there was 1 million Turks living in France. Similarly, Professor İzzet Er, and the French-Armenian politician Garo Yalic (who is an advisor to Valerie Boyer), also said that there was 1,000,000 Turks in France in 2011 and 2012 respectively.

More recently, numerous reports have suggested that the Turkish-French population exceeds one million, including Le Petit Journal in 2019 and Marianne in 2020. By 2021, Joëlle Garriaud-Maylam also said that there was over 1 million Turks in France during her speech at the Senate.

=== Birth rates ===
Although the birth rates among Turks living in France has declined over the years they remain substantially higher than the French population. In 1982, the average number of children for Turks was 5.2, compared with 1.8 for the French population. By 1990, the average number of births for Turks was 3.7 compared to 1.7 for the French population.

== Culture ==
=== Language ===
In 2000, Mehmet-Ali Akıncı and Harriet Jisa found that Turkish is spoken exclusively at home by 77% of families, while 68% of children speak French to one another. Turkish children are monolingual in the Turkish language until they start school at the age of 2 or 3; thus, they find themselves in everyday situations in which they have to speak French with their peers. By the age of 10, most children become dominant in the French language. Nonetheless, even for those who use French more than Turkish in their daily lives, numerous studies have shown that they still emphasize the importance of Turkish as the language of the family, particularly for raising children. Thus, there is a high degree of language maintenance in the Turkish community; frequent holidays to Turkey, the easy access and use of Turkish media, and the density of social networks help maintain their language.

=== Religion ===
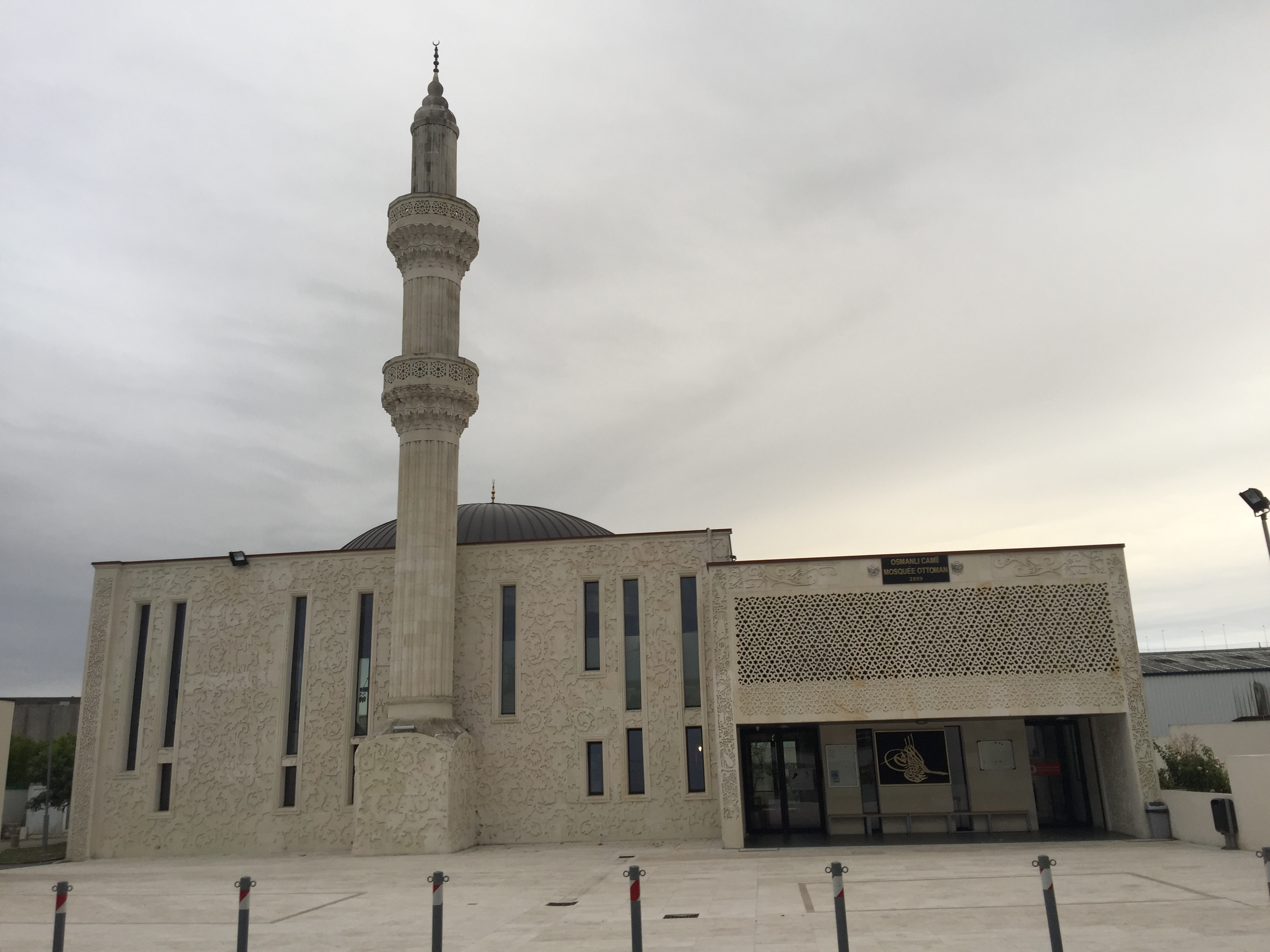
A Turkish mosque in Nantes

The majority of Turks adhere to Islam and focus on creating their own mosques and schools, most of which are tightly linked to Turkey. Thus, Turks worship their religion mainly with others within their community. Due to Turkish immigrants having a strong link to the Turkish state and much less knowledge of the French language, compared to other Muslim immigrants who have emigrated from French-speaking countries, Turks tend to build mosques where sermons are given in Turkish rather than French or Arabic.

The Turkish-Islamic Union for Religious Affairs (DİTİB), which is a branch of the Turkish state Bureau of Religious Affairs (the Diyanet), promotes a "Turkish Islam" which is based upon a moderate, rational Islam of a secular state. The Diyanet has organic links to the "Coordination Committee of Muslim Turks in France", or CCMTF, (French: Comité de coordination des musulmans turcs de France) which brings under its umbrella a total of 210 mosques. Its major competing network of mosques is run by the Millî Görüş movement (French: Communauté Islamique du Milli Görüş de France) which emphasizes the importance of solidarity of the community over integration into French society. The Millî Görüş has an estimated 70 mosques in France.

== Integration ==
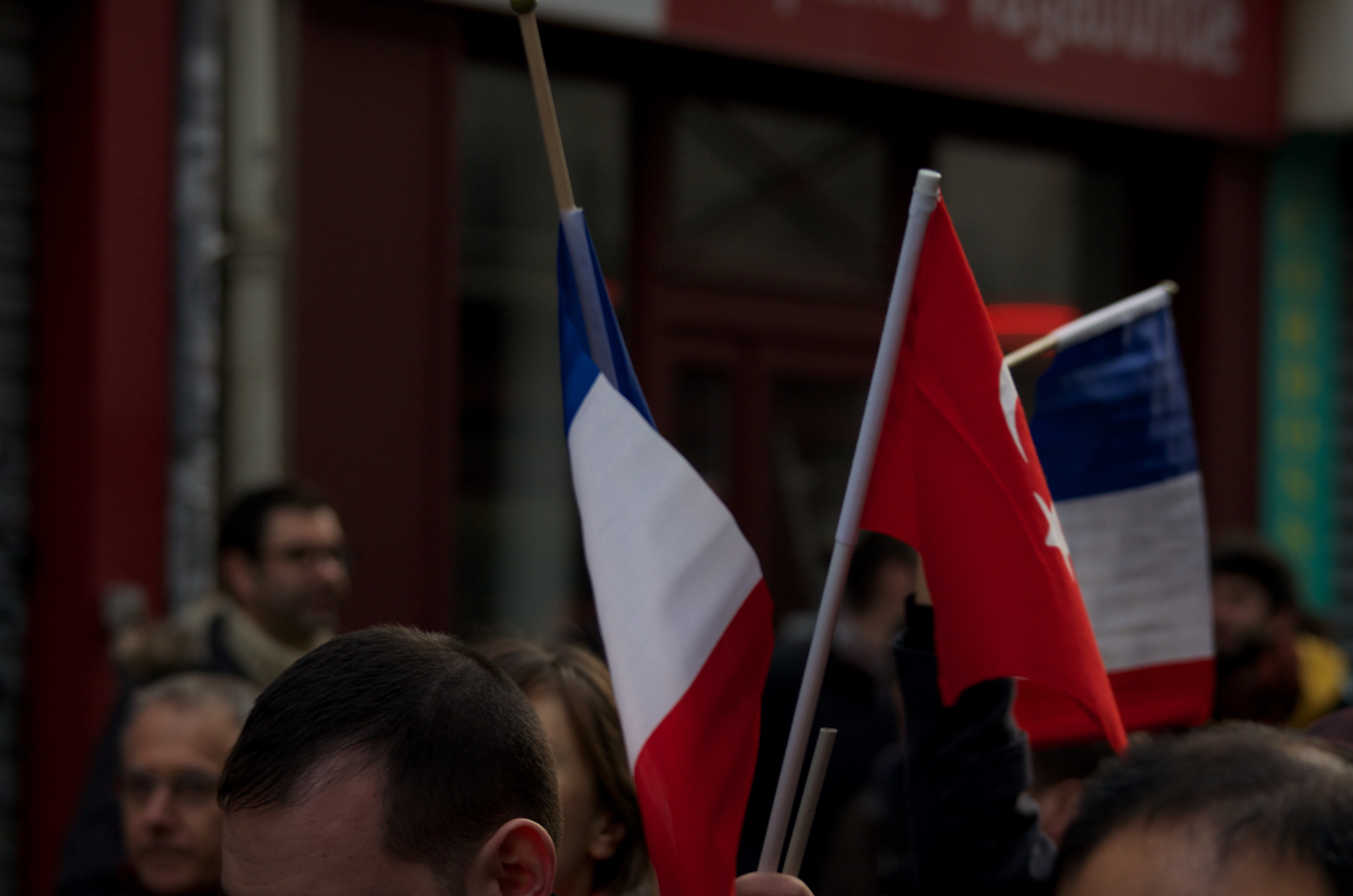
French and Turkish flags during a march in Paris in January 2015

The Turkish community is considered to be the least integrated immigrant community in France, largely due to their strong attachment to their country of origin. However, there is increasing recognition by Turkish officials that without successful integration the immigrant community cannot lobby for the home country. For example, in 2010, the Turkish Prime Minister Recep Tayyip Erdoğan stressed that assimilation is different from integration and urged the Turkish community in France to integrate by applying for French citizenship.

=== Discrimination ===
Discrimination against Turks in French society is seen particularly within the labour market when they are looking for jobs. Given a choice between a Turkish and a French with the same qualifications, French employers tend not to choose the immigrant applicant.

== Organisations and associations ==
- Comité de coordination des musulmans turcs de France, the coordination committee for Turkish Muslims in France is linked to Turkey.
- "Fransa Türk Federasyonu", the French Turks Federation.
- "Migrations et cultures de Turquie" (ELELE), promoted knowledge of Turkish immigration and helps to assist the integration of Turkish migrants into French society.

== Notable people ==
=== Notable French Turks ===
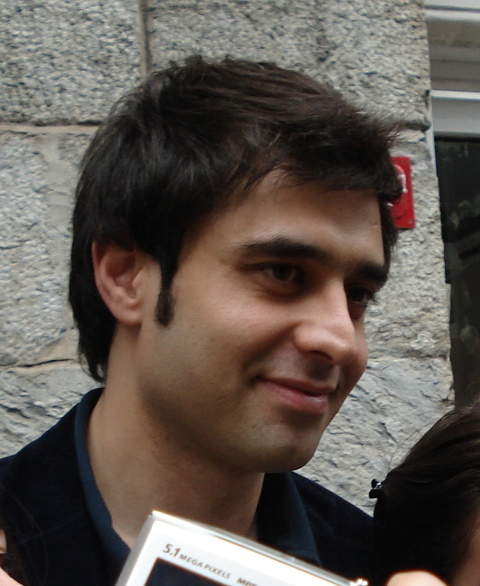
Cansel Elçin, actor

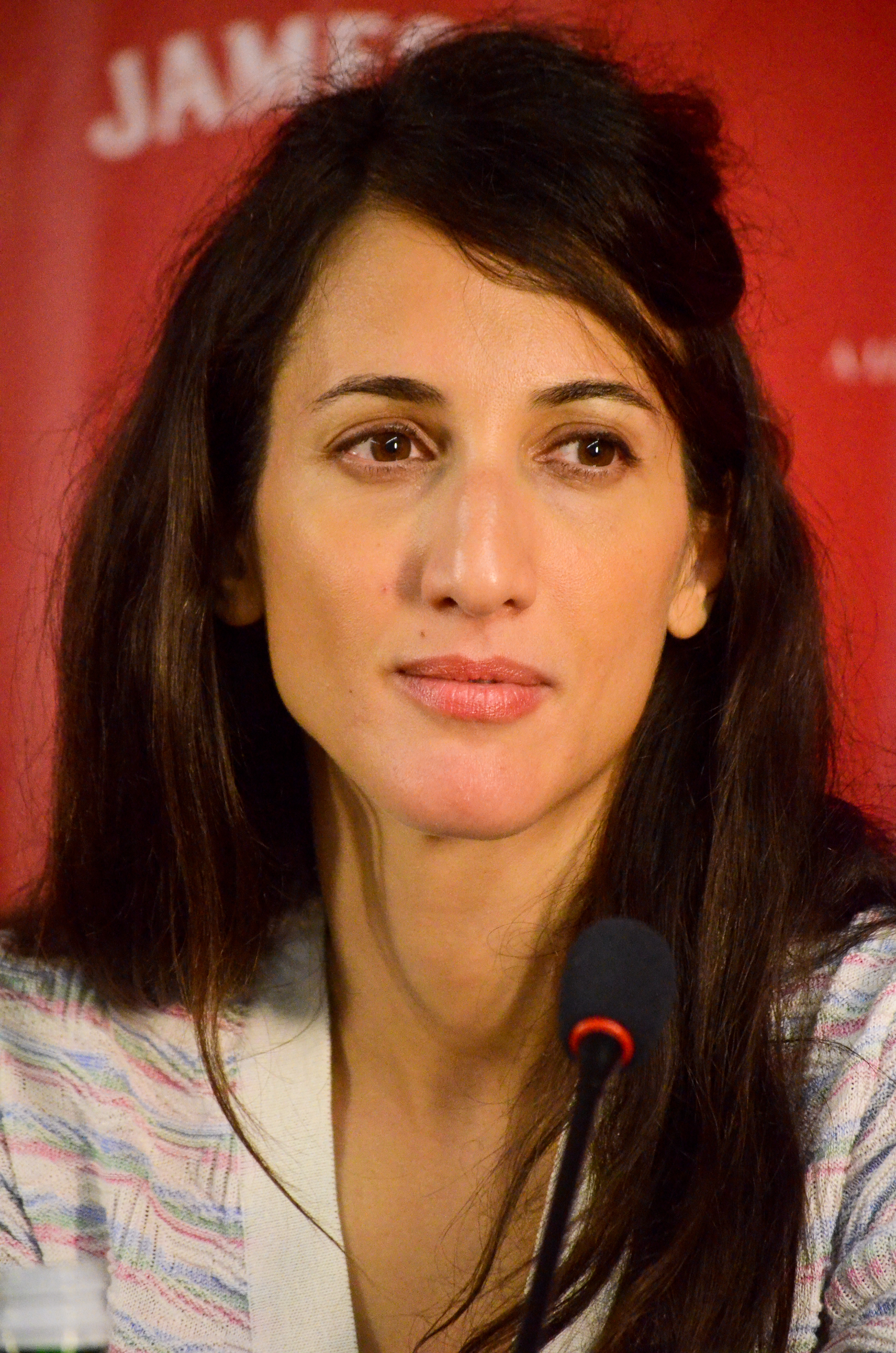
Deniz Gamze Ergüven, film director

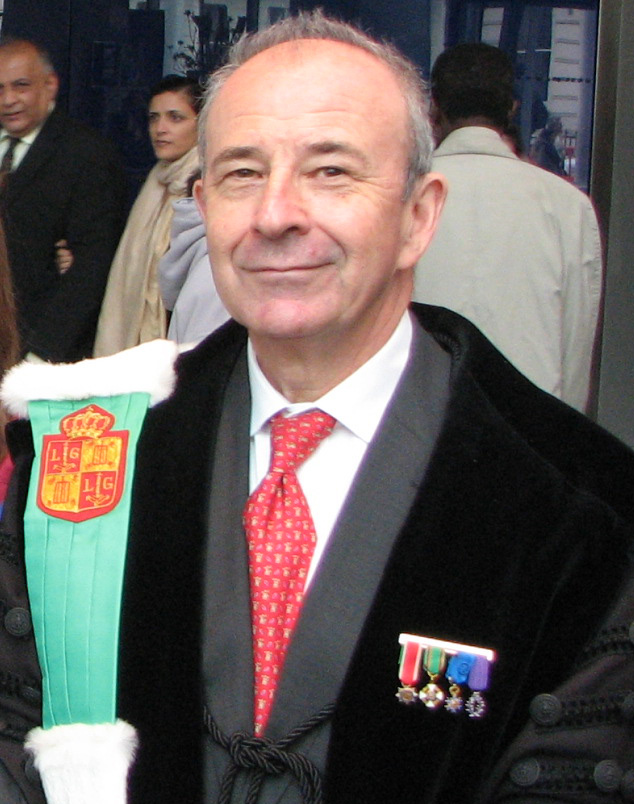
Professor Erol Gelenbe

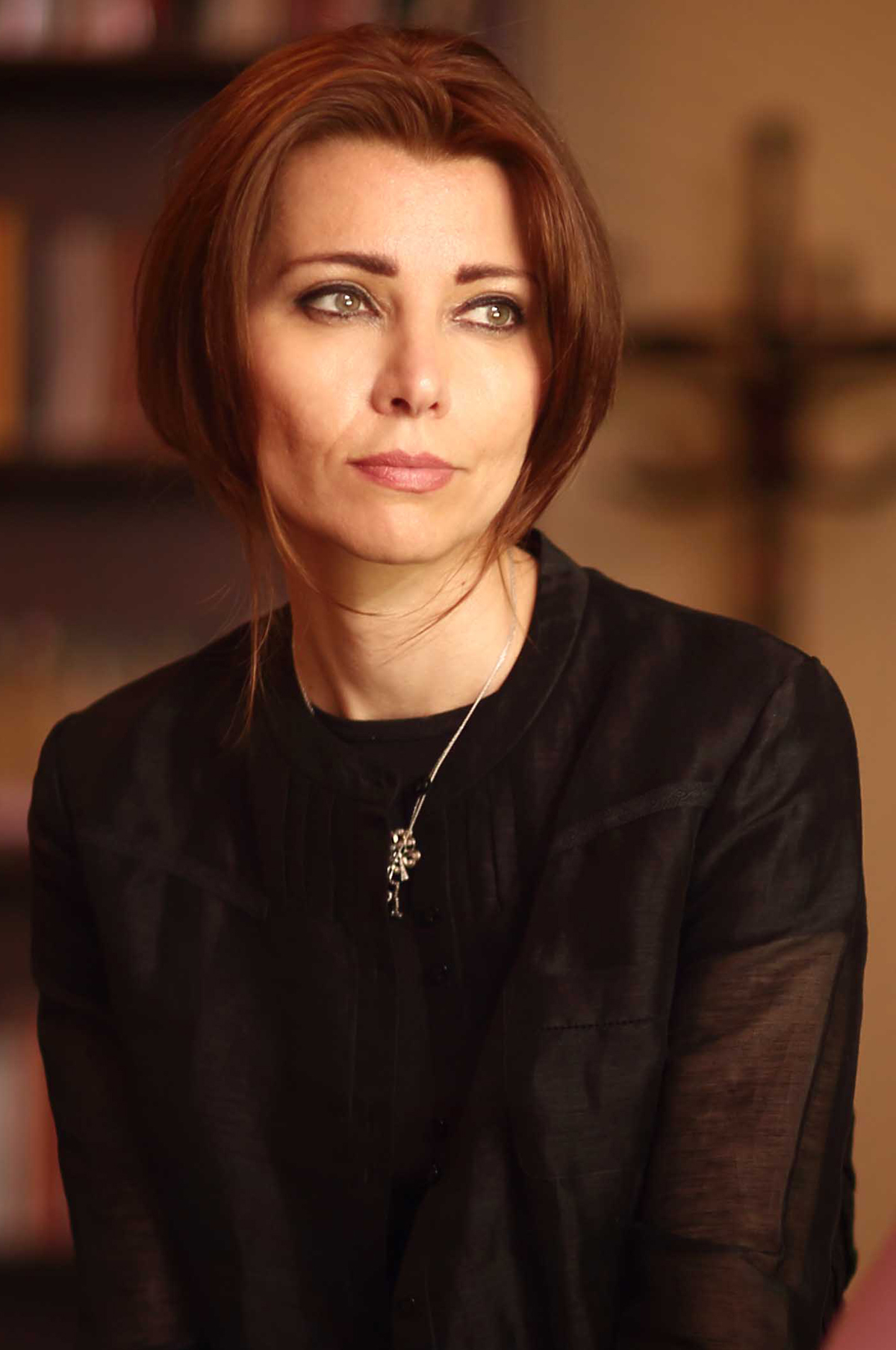
Elif Shafak, writer

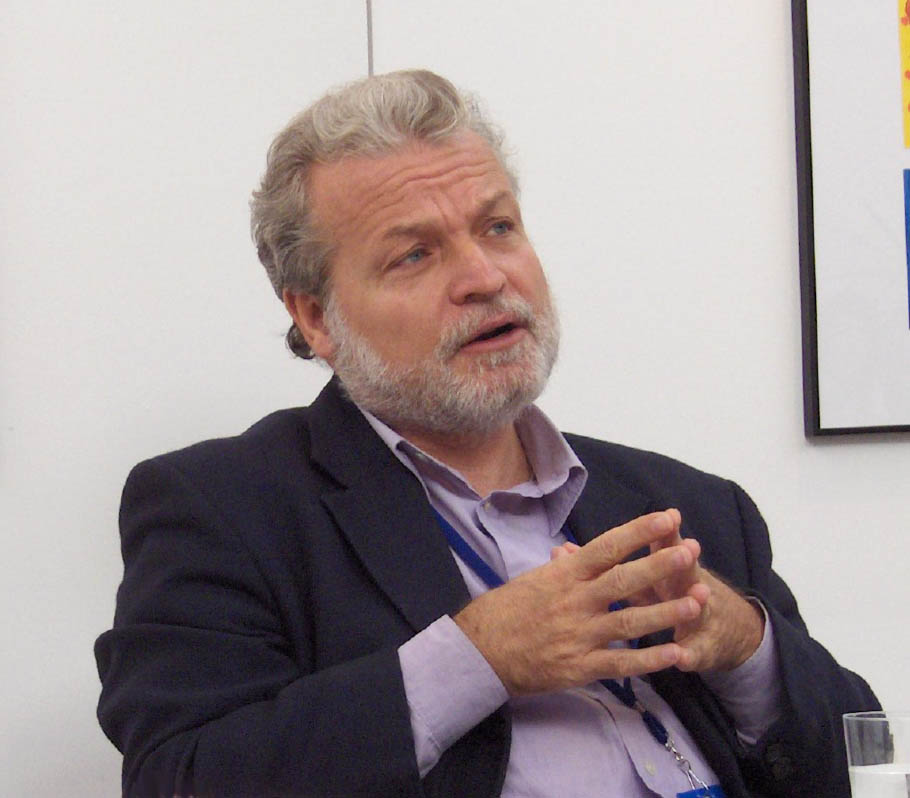
Nedim Gürsel, writer

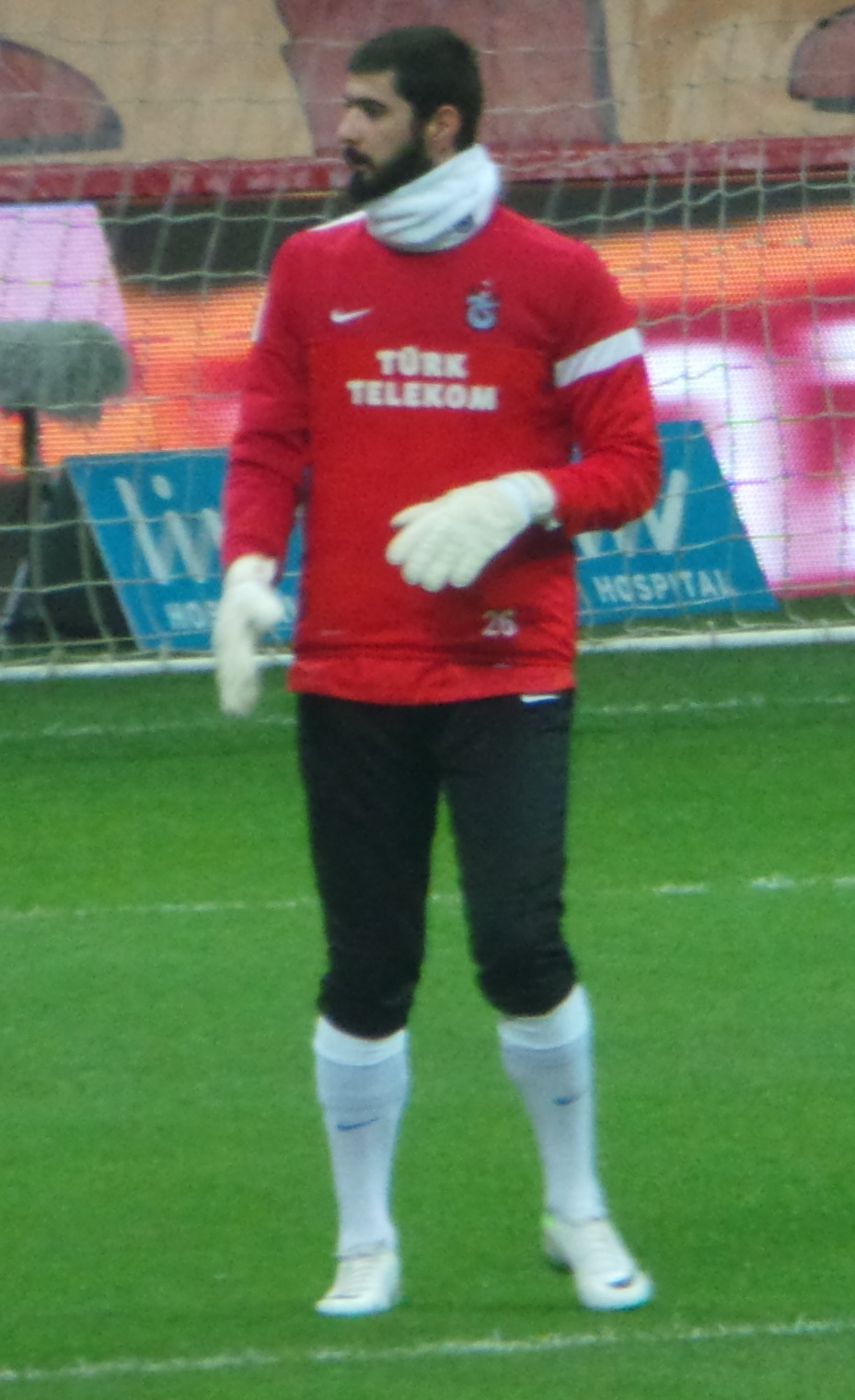
Fatih Öztürk, football player

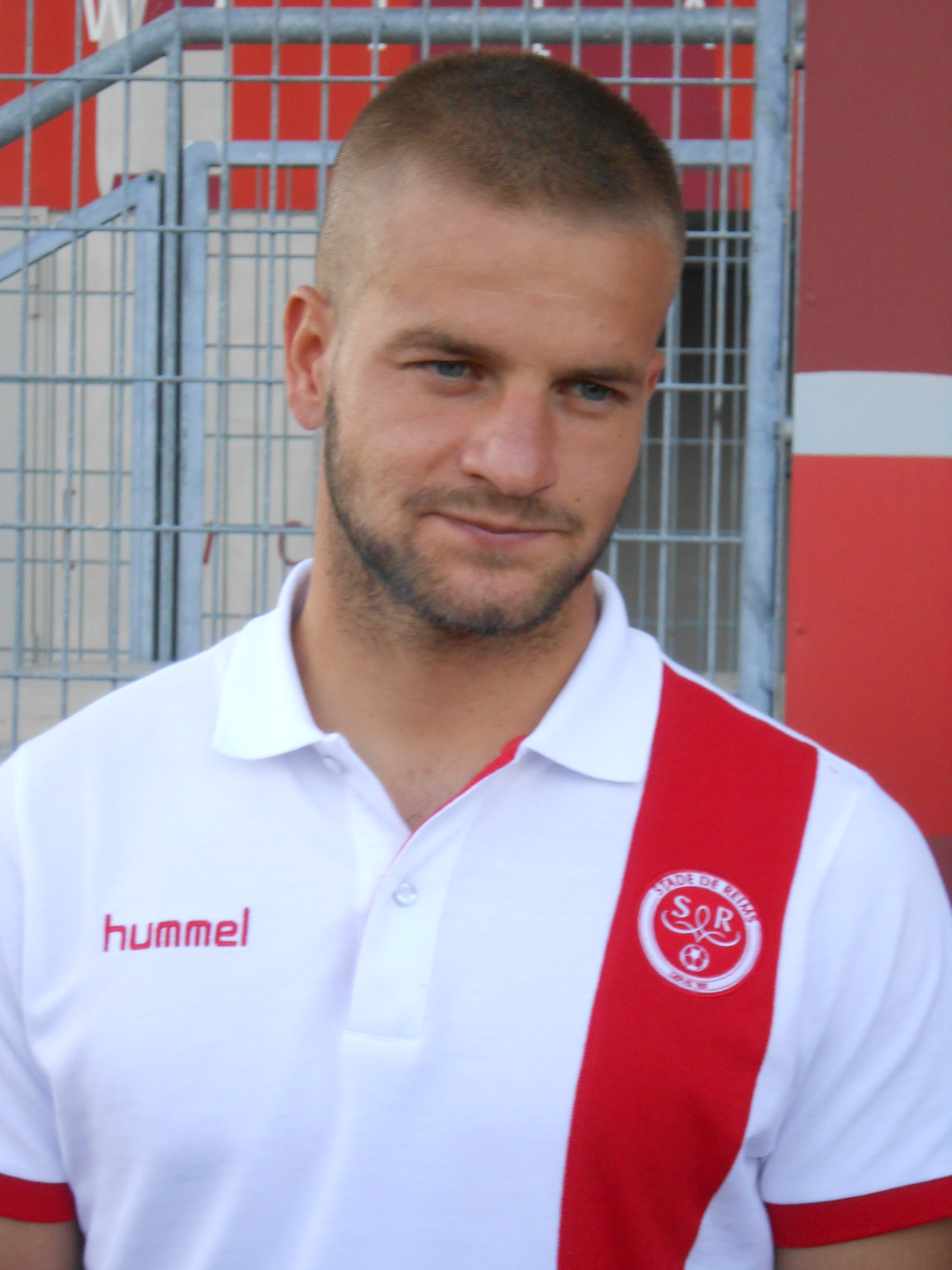
Atila Turan, football player

French Turks have contributed in many ways to the arts, academia, cinema, television, music and sports in both France and Turkey.

For example, the renowned photographer Gökşin Sipahioğlu, who founded the Paris-based photo agency Sipa Press, was dubbed "le Grand Turc" in the French media and was appointed the Knight of the Legion of Honour by president Jacques Chirac in 2007.

Also in media, there are numerous notable French Turks in cinema; for example, Deniz Gamze Ergüven is a film director whose 2015 film Mustang won the Europa Cinemas Label Award at the Cannes Film Festival as well as four awards at the 41st César Awards. On television, Anaïs Baydemir is a weather presenter for France 2 and France 3. Furthermore, Muratt Atik and Cansel Elçin have both acted in French and Turkish film and television roles.

In music, the singer Gülseren represented Turkey at the Eurovision Song Contest 2005. Meanwhile, in 2015 the singer Anne Sila participated in season 4 of The Voice : la plus belle voix.

Notable Turkish-French academics include Dr Ipek Yalcin Christmann who is a neurobiologist in charge of research at the French National Centre for Scientific Research; Erol Gelenbe who is a professor in Electrical and Electronic Engineering at Imperial College; Nilüfer Göle who is a professor of sociology at the École des Hautes Études en Sciences Sociales; Doğan Kuban who is Professor of Ottoman Architecture and History at Istanbul Technical University; the historian Nora Şeni is a professor at the Institut français de géopolitique; and Semih Vaner who was founder and president of the "French Association for the Study of the Eastern Mediterranean and the Turkish-Iranian World" (AFEMOTI), Director of the "Study Group on Contemporary Turkey and Iran (ERTCI)", and Director of "Study notebooks on the Eastern Mediterranean and the Turkish-Iranian world" (CEMOTI).

Non-fiction Turkish-French writers include Elif Shafak who was awarded the Ordre des Arts et des Lettres in 2010; the novelist Nedim Gürsel who teaches contemporary Turkish literature at the Sorbonne; Seyhan Kurt who is a poet, writer, anthropologist and sociologist; and the novelist Kenizé Mourad who descends from the exiled Ottoman royal family and is of partial Turkish descent; her bestselling book Regards from the Dead Princess: Novel of a Life sold more than 3 million copies in France and tells the story of the end of the Ottoman Empire through the eyes of her mother Princess Selma.

In fashion, the designer Ece Ege co-founded the Paris-based high fashion brand Dice Kayek with her sister Ayşe Ege; they won the prestigious Jameel Prize at the Victoria and Albert Museum in 2013.

Most obvious are the large number of male Turkish-French football players, including Emre Akbaba, Aksel Aktas, Kubilay Aktaş, Mikail Albayrak, Fatih Atik, Numan Bostan, Umut Bozok, Ozkan Cetiner, İbrahim Dağaşan, Mustafa Durak, Mevlüt Erdinç, Ayhan Güçlü, Metehan Güçlü, Ender Günlü, Serdar Gürler, Selim Ilgaz, Burak Kardeş, Samed Kılıç, Özer Özdemir, Sinan Özkan, Hakan Özmert, Fatih Öztürk, Yusuf Sari, Atila Turan, Kendal Ucar, Sabahattin Usta, Serkan Yanık and Yakup Ramazan Zorlu. In addition, there are several notable female Turkish-French football players, including Selen Altunkulak and İpek Kaya.

In religious affairs, Ahmet Ogras became the first Turkish-French President of the French Council of the Muslim Faith in 2017.

In politics, Agnès Evren was elected as a Member of the European Parliament in the 2019 election in France, and in 2020 Metin Yavuz was elected the mayor of Valenton in Paris.

=== Notable French Levantine Turks ===
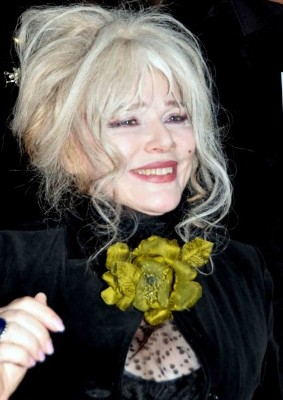
Syrian-born French singer, Armande Altaï, is of Turkish origin through her mother.

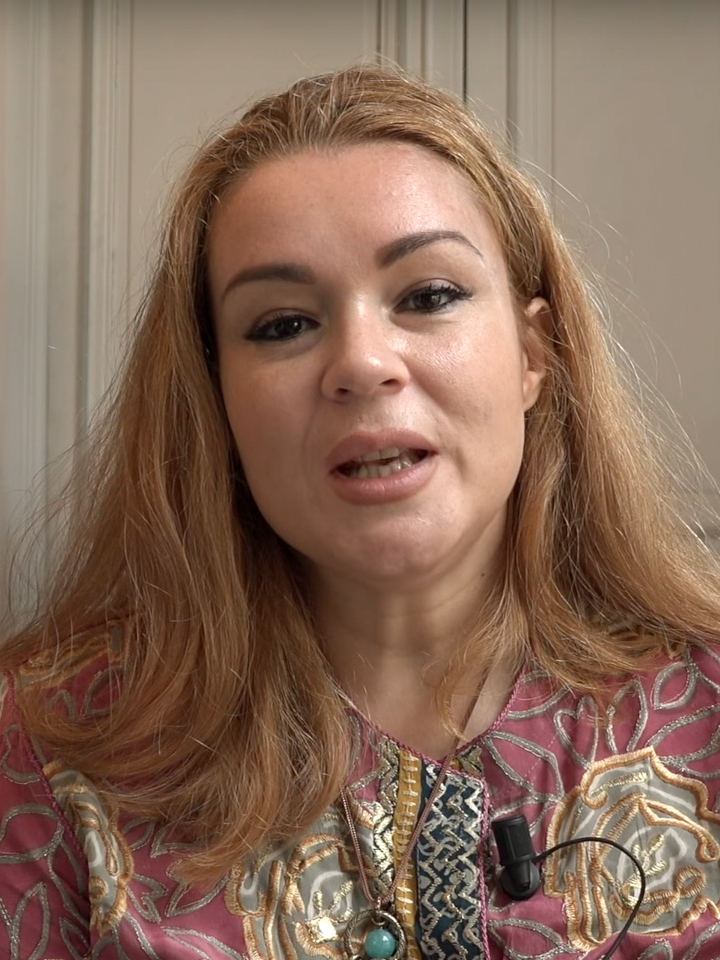
French-born writer, Yasmine Ghata, is of Turkish-Lebanese origin.

In addition to the substantial number of contributions made by French citizens of Turkish origin who descend from Turkey and the Maghreb, there are also notable French Turks who have backgrounds from other former Ottoman territories.

For example, Beirut-born French author Amin Maalouf is of Turkish origin through his Turkish-Egyptian mother. The Lebanese-born French poet and writer, Vénus Khoury-Ghata, is also of Turkish origin. Her daughter, Yasmine Ghata, was born in France and is also a writer. In addition, the Lebanese-born French businessman Emad Khashoggi, who initiated the Château Louis XIV development project in Louveciennes, is from the Turkish-Saudi Khashoggi family.

From Egypt, Cairo-born Nil Yalter is a contemporary feminist artist with both Turkish and French citizenship.

There are also notable Syrian Turks in France; for example, the French singer, Armande Altaï, was born in Aleppo to a Turkish mother. Another notable French singer of Turkish-Syrian origin is Mennel Ibtissem, who gained fame after being a contestant on The Voice France.

Farouk Mardam-Bey, who is from the prominent Turkish Syrian Mardam Bey family, is the director of the Arab world collections at the French publishing house Actes Sud.

=== Notable French people from Turkish diasporas ===
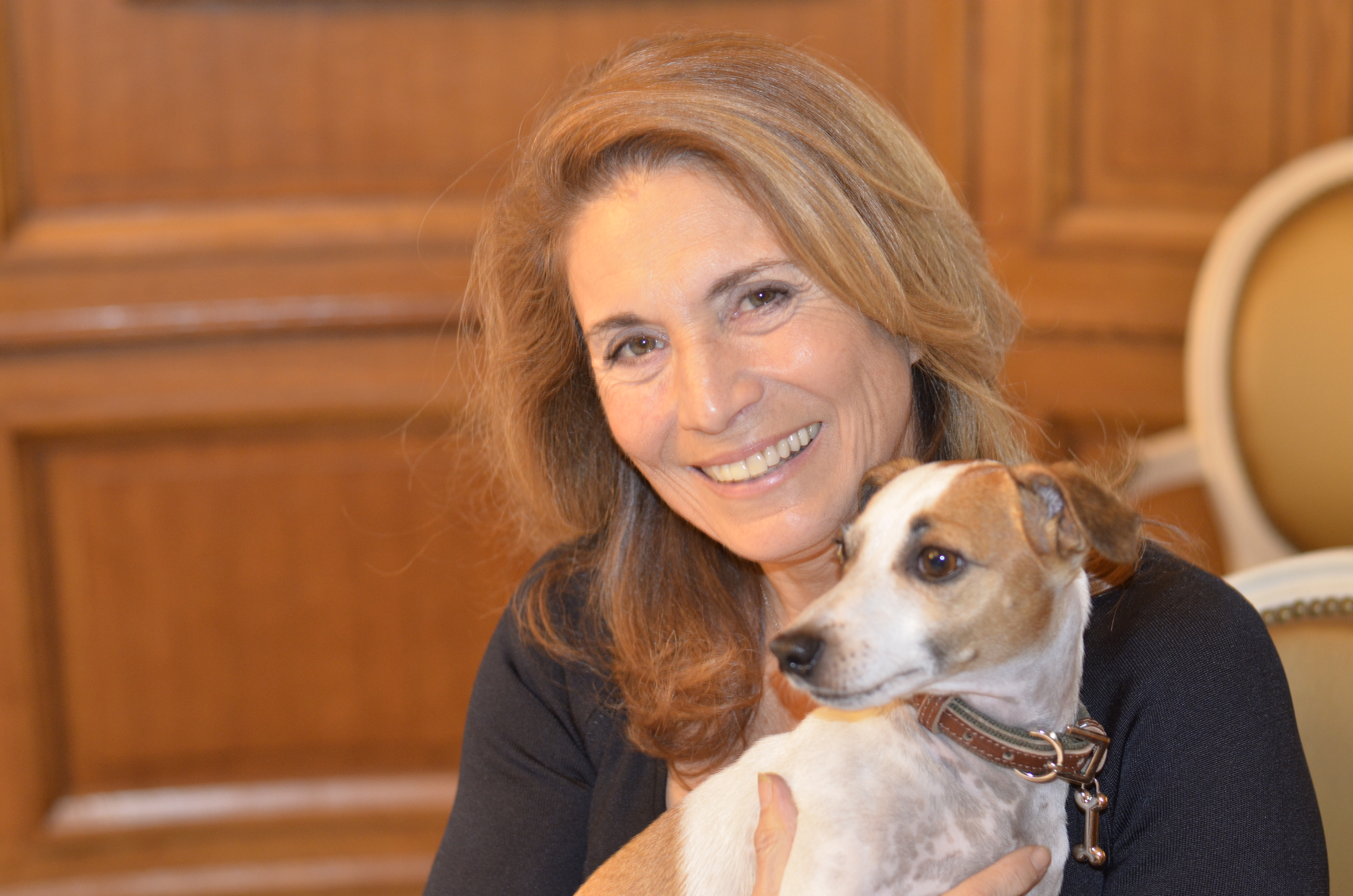
American-born French animal rights activists, Reha Kutlu-Hutin, is the President of 30 millions d'amis. She is of Turkish origin.

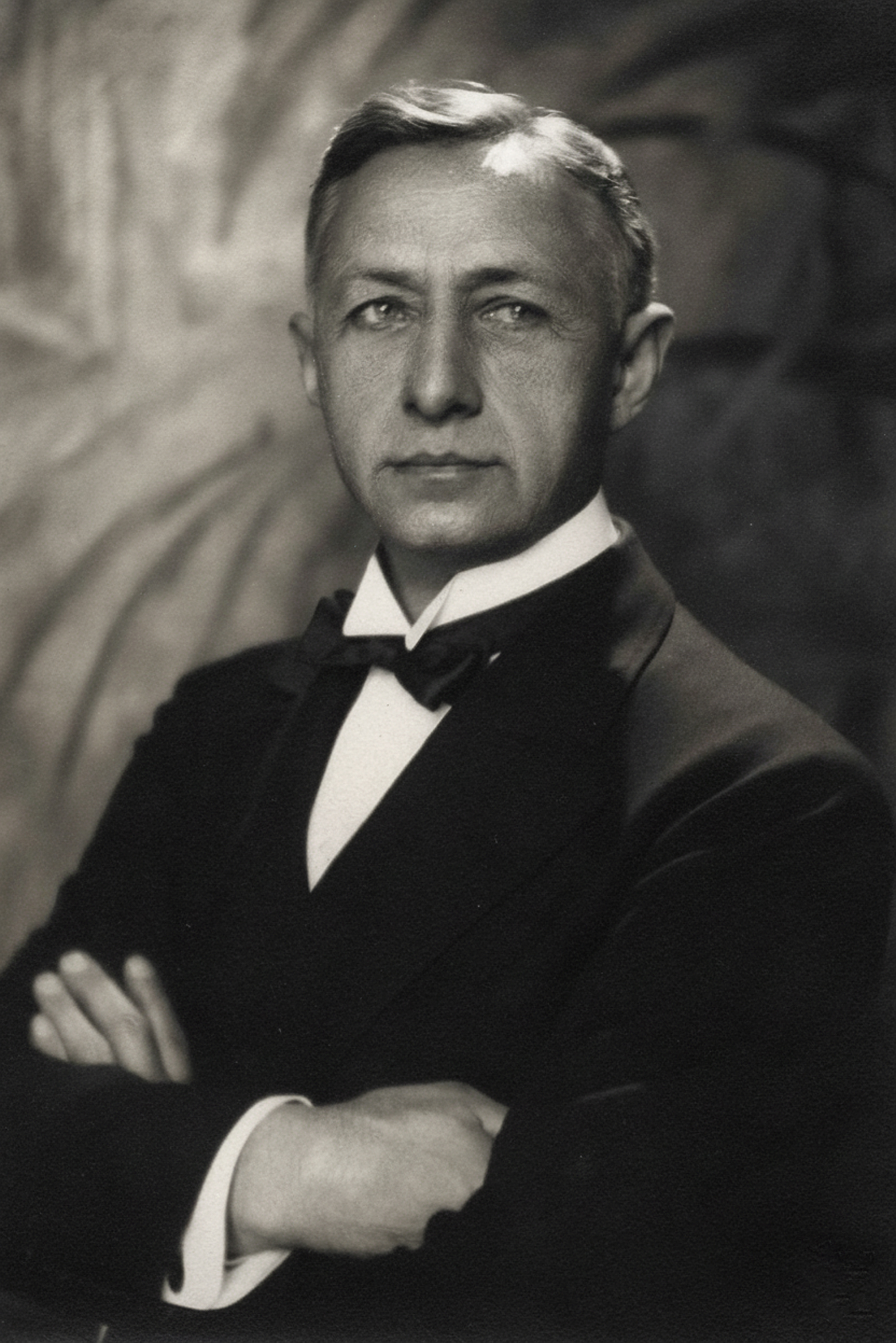
Ivan Bunin, writer

Some ethnic Turks living in France have also come from the Turkish diaspora communities (i.e. from countries that were not part of the former Ottoman Empire), especially Morocco but also from other countries with a large Turkish immigrant community.

The majority of French-Moroccans with Turkish roots are from the Turkish-Algerian diaspora and Turkish-Tunisian diaspora. For example, Leïla Chellabi is a Morocco-born writer whose father was a Turkish Algerian who obtained French citizenship. Furthermore, the Moroccan-born French businessman Ali Bourequat is from a Turkish-Tunisian family.

Other notable French people of Turkish origin from the diaspora includes the journalist Reha Kutlu-Hutin; she is from the Turkish American diaspora and is currently the President of 30 millions d'amis.

Maurice Zilber was a thoroughbred horse trainer.

=== Turkic French ===
- Sadruddin Aga Khan statesman and activist who served as United Nations High Commissioner for Refugees and His grandmother was a descendant of Qajar Emperor Fath'Ali Shah.Bayat (tribe)

== See also ==
- List of Turkish French people
- Demographics of France
- France–Turkey relations
- Franco-Ottoman alliance
- Franco-Turkish War
- Suleiman Aga, was an Ottoman Empire ambassador
- Turquestein-Blancrupt
- Turqueville, place named after the Turks
- Turkish diaspora
  - Turks in Europe
    - Turks in Belgium
    - Turks in the Netherlands
    - Turks in Germany
    - Turks in Italy
    - Turks in Spain
    - Turks in Switzerland

== Bibliography ==
- Akgönül, Samim (2009), "Turks of France: Religion, Identity and Europeanness" (PDF), in Küçükcan, Talip; Güngör, Veyis (eds.), Turks in Europe: Culture, Identity, Integration, Turkevi Research Centre, ISBN 978-90-77814-13-0.
- Akgündüz, Ahmet (2008), Labour migration from Turkey to Western Europe, 1960–1974: A multidisciplinary analysis, Ashgate Publishing, ISBN 978-0-7546-7390-3
- Akıncı, Mehmet-Ali; Jisa, Harriet (2000), "Development of Turkish clause linkage in the narrative texts of Turkish-French bilingual children in France", in Göksel, Aslı; Kerslake, Celia (eds.), Studies on Turkish and Turkic languages, Otto Harrassowitz Verlag, ISBN 3-447-04293-1
- Akıncı, Mehmet-Ali; Jisa, Harriet; Kern, Sophie (2001), "Influence of L1 Turkish on L2 French narratives", in Strömqvist, Sven (ed.), Narrative development in a multilingual context, John Benjamins Publishing, ISBN 90-272-4134-1
- Al-Shahi, Ahmed; Lawless, Richard I. (2005), Middle East and North African immigrants in Europe, Routledge, ISBN 0-415-34830-7
- Backus, Ad (2008), "Turkish as an Immigrant Language in Europe", in Bhatia, Tej K. (ed.), The Handbook of Bilingualism, Wiley-Blackwell, ISBN 978-0-631-22735-9.
- Bowen, John Richard (2008), Why the French Don't Like Headscarves: Islam, the State, and Public Space, Princeton University Press, ISBN 978-0-691-13839-8
- Bowen, John Richard (2009), Can Islam be French?: pluralism and pragmatism in a secularist state, Princeton University Press, ISBN 978-0-691-13283-9
- Çitak, Zana (2010), "Between 'Turkish Islam' and 'French Islam': The Role of the Diyanet in the Conseil Français du Culte Musulman", Journal of Ethnic and Migration Studies, 36 (4), Routledge: 619–634, doi:10.1080/13691830903421797, hdl:11511/35102, S2CID 143856721
- Crul, Maurice (2007), "The Integration of Immigrant Youth", in Suárez-Orozco, Marcelo M. (ed.), Learning in the global era: international perspectives on globalization and education, University of California Press, ISBN 978-0-520-25436-7
- Crul, Maurice (2011), "How Do Educational Systems Integrate? Integration of Second-Generation Turks in Germany, France, the Netherlands, and Austria", in Alba, Richard; Waters, Mary C. (eds.), The Next Generation: Immigrant Youth in a Comparative Perspective, NYU Press, ISBN 978-0-8147-0743-2
- Fadlouallah, Abdellatif (1994), "Migration flows from the South to western countries", in De Azevedo, Raimondo Cagiano (ed.), Migration and Development Co-operation, Council of Europe, ISBN 92-871-2611-9.
- Hargreaves, Alec G. (2007), Multi-ethnic France: immigration, politics, culture and society, Taylor & Francis, ISBN 978-0-415-39782-7
- Hunter, Shireen (2002), Islam, Europe's second religion: the new social, cultural, and political landscape, Greenwood Publishing Group, ISBN 0-275-97609-2
- Kastoryano, Riva (2002), Negotiating identities: states and immigrants in France and Germany, Princeton University Press, ISBN 0-691-01015-3
- Kirszbaum, Thomas; Brinbaum, Yaël; Simon, Patrick; Gezer, Esin (2009), "The Children of Immigrants in France: The Emergence of a Second Generation" (PDF), Innocenti Working Paper 2009–13, UNICEF Innocenti Research Centre, ISSN 1014-7837
- LeSaout, Didier; Kadri, Aïssa (2002), "Immigration policies and education in France", in Pitkänen, Pirkko; Kalekin-Fishman, Devorah; Verma, Gajendra K. (eds.), Education and immigration: settlement policies and current challenges, Routledge, ISBN 0-415-27821-X
- Marteilhe, Jean (1867), The Huguenot galley-slave: being the autobiography of a French Protestant condemned to the galleys for the sake of his religion, Leypoldt & Holt.
- McCabe, Ina Baghdiantz (2008), Orientalism in early modern France: Eurasian trade, exoticism, and the Ancien Régime, Berg, ISBN 978-1-84520-374-0
- Milewski, Nadja; Hamel, Christelle (2010), "Union Formation and Partner Choice in a Transnational Context: The Case of Descendants of Turkish Immigrants in France", International Migration Review, 44 (3), Center for Migration Studies of New York: 615–658, doi:10.1111/j.1747-7379.2010.00820.x, S2CID 142643794
- Morrison, John; Gardiner, Robert (1995), The Age of the Galley: Mediterranean oared vessels since pre-classical times, Conway, ISBN 0-85177-955-7
- Nielsen, Jørgen S.; Akgonul, Samim; Alibasic, Ahmet (2009), Yearbook of Muslims in Europe, BRILL, ISBN 978-90-04-17505-1
- Organisation for Economic Co-operation and Development (2008), International Migration Outlook: SOPEMI 2008, OECD Publishing, ISBN 978-92-64-04565-1
- Peignard, Emmanuel (2006), "Immigration in France", in Lynch, Jean B. (ed.), France in Focus: Immigration Policies, Foreign Policy, and U.S. Relations, Nova Publishers, ISBN 1-59454-935-4
- Rollan, Françoise; Sourou, Benoît (2006), Les migrants turcs de France: entre repli et ouverture, Maison des Sciences de l'Homme d'Aquitaine, ISBN 2-85892-330-2
- Takeda, Junko Thérèse (2011), Between Crown and Commerce: Marseille and the Early Modern Mediterranean, JHU Press, ISBN 978-0-8018-9982-9
