= Harriet Jisa =

Linguist

Harriet Jisa is an emeritus professor of linguistics at Lumière University Lyon 2. Her research has made significant contributions to the study of language development and the development of literacy.

== Education, career and honours ==
Jisa completed two PhDs, the first at the University of Southern California in 1985, the second at Lyon 2 in 1989, where she also received her habilitation. After briefly occupying positions at California State University, Long Beach and the University of California, Santa Barbara, she took up an assistant professorship at the Lumière University Lyon 2 in 1982, becoming promoted to associate professor in 1989 and to full professor in 1992. She retired in 2014, and was appointed member of the Academy of Europe in 2015. She is also a member of the prestigious Institut Universitaire de France, to which she was appointed senior member in 2009.

== Research ==
Jisa's research has focused on language development cross-linguistically, both in young children and later in life. The development of literacy has also been a major focus in her research. Highly cited works of hers include a paper on the acquisition of academic French, a major co-authored paper on the cross-linguistic development of passive voice constructions in written text, an article on the development of relative clauses in narrative texts by French children, and a paper on language mixing in French-English bilingual infants.

== Selected publications ==
- Jisa, Harriet, and Sophie Kern. 1998. Relative clauses in French children's narrative texts. Journal of Child Language 25 (3), 623–652. doi:10.1017/S0305000998003523
- Jisa, Harriet. 2000. Language mixing in the weak language: Evidence from two children. Journal of Pragmatics 32 (9), 1363–1386. doi:10.1016/S0378-2166(99)00104-6
- Jisa, Harriet, Judy Reilly, Ludo Verhoeven, Elisheva Baruch, and Elisa Rosado. 2002. Passive voice constructions in written texts: A cross-linguistic developmental study. Written Language & Literacy 5 (2), 163–181. doi:10.1075/wll.5.2.03jis
- Jisa, Harriet. 2004. Growing into academic French. In Ruth A. Berman (ed.), Language development across childhood and adolescence, 135–161. Amsterdam: John Benjamins. ISBN 9789027295002
