= Dice Kayek =

Fashion label

- Industry: Fashion
- Founded: 1992
- Founder: Ece Ege; Ayşe Ege

Dice Kayek is a Paris-based high fashion brand founded by the Turkish sisters Ece and Ayşe Ege in 1992. Ece Ege is the creative director of the brand and Ayşe Ege is the manager of the company.

== Activities ==
In 1992, ESMOD (Paris) graduate Ece Ege created a collection of 15 white poplin shirts. The following year, together with sister Ayşe Ege, they continued to expand the white shirt collection with new designs.

In 1993, Dice Kayek presented for the first time a complete women's ready-to-wear collection in Paris. Women's Wear Daily commented: "Their gauzy poet blouses and coats with bows have found a quick following here among the fashion romantics, especially considering that this was their first runway show."

In 1994, Dice Kayek became a member of the English: French Federation of Fashion and of Ready-to-Wear of Couturiers and Fashion Designers.

In 1996, with the support of the fashion group Mitsui & Co. (Tokyo), the sisters also launched Dice Kayek Pink Label in Japan.

In 2002, Dice Kayek was invited by the Korean government to present their Autumn/Winter 2002-03 collection at Seoul Fashion Week. The same year, Ece Ege also became the Artistic Director of the Japanese fashion house Hanae Mori. In 2003, she received the 'Femme en Or' fashion award.

In 2004, Dice Kayek joined forces with the Ayaydın-Miroglio Group to create the Turkish contemporary ready-to-wear brand Machka, and Ece Ege was named creative and artistic director of the brand.

In 2010, the France-Euro-Mediterranean Association presented Ece Ege with the Female Achievement Award for Dice Kayek's contribution to fostering creative and cultural links between the French, European and Turkish cultures.

As part of an exhibition to celebrate the year of Turkey in France at the Musée des Arts Décoratifs, Paris, Dice Kayek showed their Istanbul Contrast collection, which focused on significant symbols of Istanbul's diverse cultural history. The collection was lauded by top international fashion critics. Vogue Italia's Elisa Pervinca Bellini, noted: "In the embroideries and details, in the silhouettes and lines of the two sisters' collection there is a strong focus on the lights, the symbols and the allure of old Constantinople." Later, Istanbul Contrast became a traveling exhibition, and was shown at the Istanbul Modern Museum (2010) and the Amsterdam Museum (2011). In 2011, Dice Kayek also opened two pop-up retail shops: one at Les Galeries Lafayette (Paris) and one at Fenwick (London).

In 2013, to coincide with the Salone del Mobile 2013 in Milan, the Turkish design firm Demirden Design invited six designers, among them Matthew Lehanneur, Arik Levy and Dice Kayek, to create a work out of Turkish marble, to be unveiled in an exhibition titled 'Bathing in Light'. For the project, Ece and Ayşe Ege created an exceptional installation called Nebula, which integrated the marble into the idea of a minimalist, light-filled Turkish bath.

On 10 December 2013, Dice Kayek won the third edition of the Victoria and Albert Museum's Jameel Prize. Three Couture pieces from their Istanbul Contrast collection were on display at the museum, along with the works of all the other finalists, from 11 December 2013 to 21 April 2014. The show then travelled to other museums around the world.

== See also ==
- Rodarte
