= Salma Mardam Bey =

Syrian writer and historian

Salma Mardam Bey (Arabic: سلمى مردم بك Turkish: Selma Mardam Bey) is a Syrian writer and historian.

== Early life and education ==
Mardam Bey was born in Syria into a family of Turkish origin. Her father, Jamil Mardam Bey, was the former Syrian Prime Minister. She studied in egypt during her primary schooling years, where she studied at the English Girls School (EGC) during 1950’s in Alexandria, Egypt.She studied in the Faculty of Oriental Studies at the University of Oxford, where her thesis was entitled "Syria, 1939-45, as depicted by the Mardam Bey papers".

== Publications ==
She is renowned for publishing the memoirs of her father, Jamil Mardam Bey, dating from 1939 to 1945. Her first book was initially written in French entitled, "La Syrie et la France: Bilan d'une equivoque, 1939-1945" (1994), and then translated into English entitled, "Syria's Quest for Independence, 1939-1945" (1997). The book has also been translated into Arabic, entitled "Awrak Jamil Mardam Bey".
