= Mardam-Bey =

Mardam-Bey (Arabic: مردم بك) is a surname of a prominent Syrian family of Ottoman Turkish ancestry. Mardam-Bey's are also the descendants of Abd Al Rahman Ben Mouhamad Ben Moustafa Bey Al Kourmoshi whose ancestor is the famous minister Lala Moustafa Pasha, the Grand Vizier of the Ottoman Empire and the leader of the conquest of Cyprus Island.

People with the surname Mardam-Bey include:

- Jamil Mardam Bey (1894–1960), Syrian politician, Foreign Minister, Prime Minister
- Khaled Mardam-Bey (born 1968), British software developer and creator of mIRC
- Khalil Mardam Bey (1895–1959), Syrian poet who composed the Syrian national anthem's lyrics
- Salma Mardam Bey, Syrian writer and historian
