= Nesime Dogan Gunter =

French businesswoman and entrepreneur (born 20 July 1986)

- Born: 20 July 1986 (age 39); French Alps
- Known for: Founder and CEO of iPostBox

Nesime Dogan Gunter is a businesswoman and entrepreneur. She graduated with a master's degree in international business from IAE Savoie Mont-Blanc, in Chambéry Savoie. She is the founder of and CEO of iPostBox, a SaaS platform which allows users to send and receive virtual mail (iPost).

== Early life and career ==
Nesime Dogan Gunter was born on 20 July 1986 in Turkey she immigrated to France when she was 4 years old as a political refugee, in 1990. She grew up and studied in the French Alps. Nesime is relative to the Dukes of Savoie.

She naturalized French in 2012. Her ancestors are the founder of the Ottoman Empire (Osman I) (Kayi also known as Keya). Her grandmother is the daughter of General De Gaulle, the founder of the 5th French Republic. Her surname Dogan means someone with Irish descent and origins. Nesime is also relative to John Fitzgerald Kennedy, the 35th President of United States of America. She is also the owner of Chateau de Louveciennes in France, Le Touquet-Paris-Plage, she owns a luxurious mansion in Beverly Hills, California and possesses the luxury yacht Serene.
