= Ayhan Güçlü =

Turkish footballer (born 1990)

Personal information
- Full name: Ayhan Güçlü
- Date of birth: 28 March 1990 (age 36)
- Place of birth: Montfermeil, France
- Height: 1.75 m (5 ft 9 in)
- Position: Forward

Youth career
- 2000–2002: UF Clichois
- 2002–2005: AS Bondy
- 2005–2008: Lorient

Senior career*
Years	Team	Apps	(Gls)
2008–2009	Hacettepe	7	(5)
2010	Tekirova Belediyespor	6	(1)
2010–2011	Tubize	2	(0)
2011	→ Mouscron (loan)		
2011–2012	Mouscron		
2012–2013	Evian TG II	6	(0)
2013	Brașov	2	(0)
2013–2014	Olympique Saint-Quentin	3	(1)
2014–2015	Roye-Noyon II		

International career
2008	Turkey U18	2	(0)
2008	Turkey U19	2	(0)
- * Club domestic league appearances and goals

Ayhan Güçlü (born 28 March 1990) is a Turkish former professional footballer who played as a forward.

== Personal life ==
Güçlü's younger brother, Metehan Güçlü, is also a professional footballer and youth international for Turkey.
