= Ece Ege =

Turkish-French fashion designer (born 1963)

Ece Ege (born 1963 in Bursa, Turkey) is a Turkish-French fashion designer and founder of the prêt-à-porter line DICE KAYEK.

== Career ==
For her first collection in 1991, Ege created 13 shirts in white poplin, conceived a bit for herself. The success led to the launching of her prêt-à-porter line DICE KAYEK in 1992. With DICE, her second line launched in 1994.

== Awards ==
In 2003, she was chosen Femme en Or which is an award given to the most successful women in France.
