= Sabahattin Usta =

Turkish footballer (born 1990)

Personal information
- Date of birth: 9 June 1990 (age 36)
- Place of birth: Montbéliard, France
- Height: 1.74 m (5 ft 8 1/2 in)
- Position: Midfielder

Team information
- Current team: Serik Belediyespor
- Number: 10

Youth career
- Bordeaux

Senior career*
Years	Team	Apps	(Gls)
2009–2011	Gençlerbirliği	2	(0)
2010–2011	→ Hacettepe (loan)	11	(2)
2012–2014	Çubukspor	58	(6)
2014–2016	Batman Petrolspor	57	(11)
2016–2017	Çorum FK	36	(3)
2017–2018	Ankara Demirspor	36	(9)
2018–2019	52 Orduspor	30	(4)
2019–2020	Batman Petrolspor	24	(6)
2020–2021	52 Orduspor	24	(5)
2021–	Serik Belediyespor	52	(15)

International career
2007–2008	Turkey U18	10	(2)
- * Club domestic league appearances and goals as of 5 March 2023

Sabahattin Usta (born 9 June 1990) is a Turkish footballer who plays as a midfielder for Serik Belediyespor. He has represented Turkey at youth international level.
