= Numan Bostan =

French footballer (born 1998)

Personal information
- Full name: Numan Bostan Soysal
- Date of birth: 31 January 1998 (age 28)
- Place of birth: France
- Position: Goalkeeper

Senior career*
Years	Team	Apps	(Gls)
-2017	Toulouse FC	1	(0)
2017-	Gençlerbirliği S.K.	0	(0)
2018-	Hacettepe S.K.→(loan)	15	(0)
- * Club domestic league appearances and goals

Numan Bostan Soysal (born 31 January 1998) is a French footballer.

== Career ==
Bostan did not start playing club football until the age of 12. Despite this, he soon joined Toulouse amid interest from Nantes, Girondins de Bordeaux, Olympique Lyonnais, and Olympique de Marseille.

In 2015, Bostan was part of the France squad that won that year's UEFA European Under-17 Championship even though he did not make an appearance during the tournament.

After making one appearance for Toulouse in the French Ligue 1, he signed for Turkish club Gençlerbirliği S.K., before being sent on loan to Hacettepe S.K. in the Turkish third division.

== Honours ==
France U17

- UEFA European Under-17 Championship: 2015
