= Leïla Chellabi =

Moroccan-born French writer and artist

- Occupations: Songwriter; Model; Dancer; Radio Host
- Notable work: She is the last companion of the award-winning French novelist Romain Gary.

Leïla Chellabi is a Moroccan-born French writer and digital artist who has published over 100 books. She is also a former dancer, model, radio host, and songwriter. Chellabi is also notable for being the last companion of the award-winning French novelist Romain Gary. Her father was an Algerian of Turkish origin who emigrated to Morocco after obtaining French citizenship.
