= Gökşin Sipahioğlu =

Turkish photographer and journalist

- Born: 28 December 1926; İzmir, Turkey
- Died: 5 October 2011 (aged 84); Paris, France
- Occupation: Photographer

Gökşin Sipahioğlu (28 December 1926 – 5 October 2011) was a Turkish photographer and journalist who founded the Paris-based photo agency Sipa Press. He spent most of his life in Paris where the French media dubbed him "le Grand Turc". He also helped found the Kadiköy Sports Club, now best known for the Efes Pilsen basketball team.

He was the editor of the Istanbul Express and played an active role in the riot against non-Muslims of Turkey on 6 and 7 September 1955. In an interview conducted in 1991 regarding the 1955 riots a brigadier general stated: "The attacks of 6/7 September were certainly planned by the Special Operations Unit. It was an extremely premediated operation and it accomplished its objective. Let me ask you; wasn't it a (sic) extraordinarily successful action?"

== Early life and education ==
Sipahioğlu was born on 28 December 1926, in İzmir, Turkey. He attended the Lycée Saint-Joseph in Istanbul and later studied journalism at Istanbul University.

== Career ==
Sipahioğlu became a frontline photojournalist from the 1950s onwards. He received international recognition for his 1956 photos of wounded Egyptian soldiers after Israel invaded the Sinai Peninsula during the Suez Crisis.

Sipahioğlu was one of the few Western reporters or photographers in Havana during the Cuban Missile Crisis in 1962 . He conveyed the tension of the time and many of his photographs of the crisis appeared on the front pages of many world newspapers.

In 1968 Sipahioğlu's photographs of riots in Paris, between police and student protesters, became enduring images of the uprising. This led him to work for the international photo agencies Black Star and Gamma.

In 1972 he was sent to Munich to cover the Olympics where he chronicled the Palestinian attack on Israeli athletes. The recognition for these pictures led him to launch Sipa Press the following year, in 1973, along with his partner Phyllis Springer. Sipa went on to represent some of the world's best known photographers.

In 2001 he sold Sipa Press to Sud Communication, owned by the industrialist Pierre Fabre, but stayed on as chairman until his retirement in 2003.

== Awards and recognition ==
In January 2007, the French president Jacques Chirac appointed Sipahioğlu Knight of the Legion of Honour.

== Personal Life and Death ==
Sipahioğlu married Phyllis Springer in 2002. He died on Monday 5 October 2011, in a hospital in Paris at the age of 84.
