= Nedim Gürsel =

Turkish writer (born 1951)

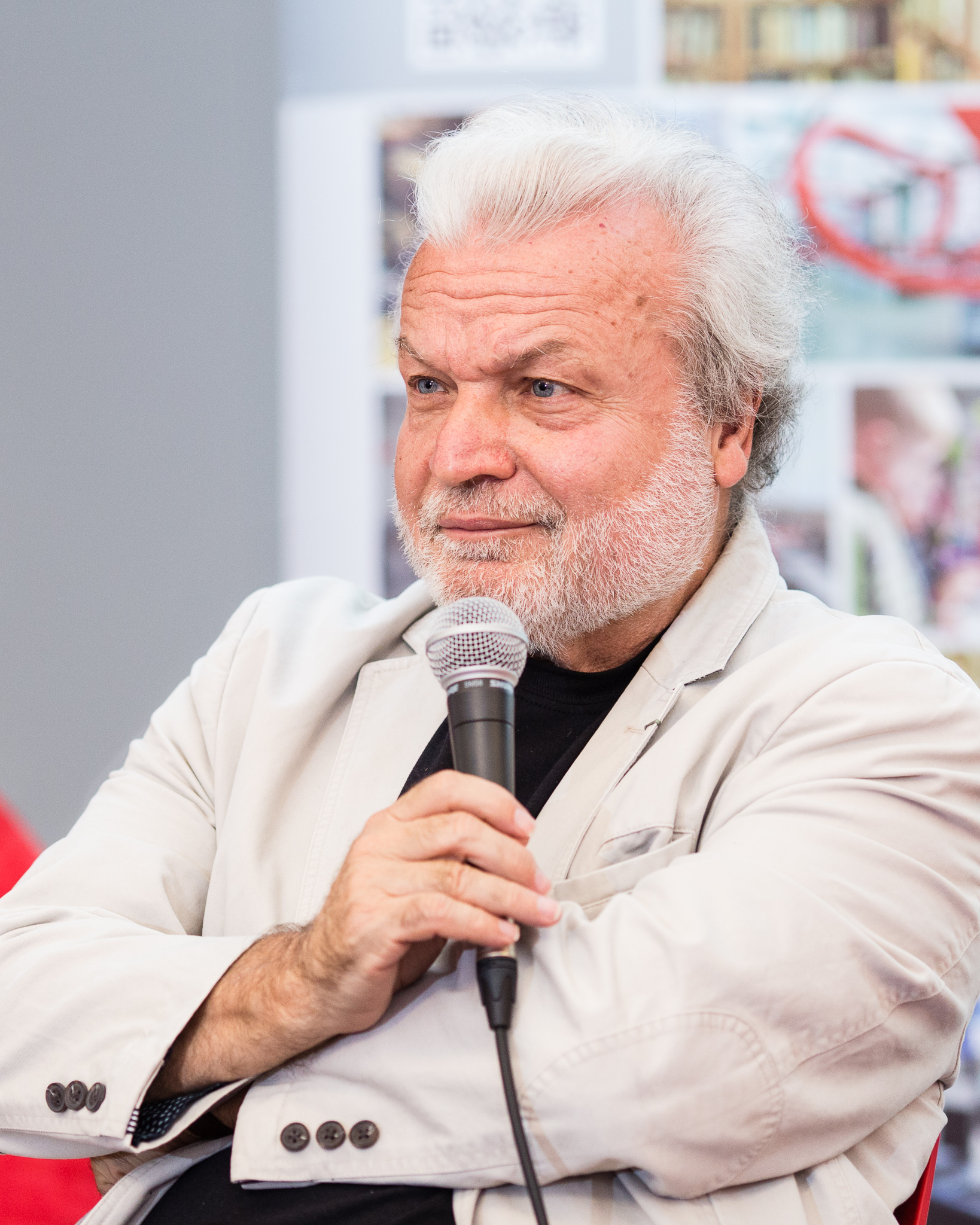
Nedim Gürsel

Nedim Gürsel (born 5 April 1951 in Gaziantep) is a Turkish writer. In the late 1960s, he published novellas and essays in Turkish magazines. After graduating from Galatasaray High School in 1970, he studied at the Sorbonne. In 1974, he graduated from the Sorbonne's Department of Modern French Literature. In 1979, he received his doctorate in comparative literature after completing his dissertation on Louis Aragon and Nazim Hikmet. He returned to Turkey, but the unrest there in 1980 persuaded him to go back to France.

In 1976, Gürsel published A Summer without End, a collection of stories. For that collection, in 1977, Gürsel received Turkey's highest literary prize, the Prize of the Turkish Language Academy. After the 1980 Turkish coup d'état, a military tribunal charged that Gürsel's collection had slandered the Turkish army. In 1983, the Turkish military censored Gürsel's novel The First Woman. Although the Turkish authorities dismissed the charges against Gürsel, their actions made A Summer without End and The First Woman unavailable in Turkey for several years.

In 2008, Gürsel published The Daughters of Allah. The book prompted the Turkish authorities to charge Gürsel with insulting religion. In June 2009, a court in Istanbul acquitted Gürsel of the charge.

Gürsel is a founding member of the International Parliament of Writers. In 2019, he was the eleventh Friedrich Dürrenmatt Guest Professor for World Literature at the University of Bern. Today, a citizen of France, he teaches contemporary Turkish literature at the Sorbonne, and works as the research director on Turkish Literature at the International French Science Research Center (CNRS).

Gürsel's awards include:

- 1977, Prize of the Turkish Language Academy
- 1986, the Abdi Ipekçi Prix for his contribution to the bringing together of Greeks and Turks)
- 1986, the Freedom Award by French PEN Club
- 1987, Haldun Taner Citation (with Tomris Uyar and Murathan Munhan)
- 1990, The prize for best international scenario by Radio France Internationale
- 1992, Struga Gold Plaque Award
- 2004, France-Turquie Literary Prize “Fernand Rouillon”
- 2004, Art and Literature Chivalry by French Government.

Gürsel's works include:

- Kadınlar Kitabı (The Book of Women), 1975
- Uzun Sürmüş Bir Yaz (A Summer without End), 1976
- İlk Kadın (The First Woman), 1986 and 2004
- Sevgilim İstanbul (Istanbul My Love), 1986
- Son Tramvay (The Last Tram), 1991
- Saint Nazaire Günlügü (The Newspaper of Saint-Nazaire), 1995
- Boğazkesen, Fatih'in Romanı (The Conqueror), 1996
- Balkanlara Dönüş (Return to the Balkans), 1995
- Nâzım Hikmet ve Geleneksel Türk Yazını (Nazim Hikmet and Turkish popular literature), 2000
- Yaşar Kemal: Bir Geçiş Dönemi Romancısı (Yachar Kemal: the novel of a transition), 2000 and 2005
- Aragon: Başkaldırıdan Gerçeğe (The Perpetual Motion of Aragon—dadaïst revolt with the real world), 2000
- Sağ Salim Kavuşsak, Çocukluk Yılları (In the country of captive fish—a Turkish childhood), 2004
- Allah'ın Kızları (The Daughters of Allah), 2008.
