= Samed Kılıç =

French footballer (born 1996)

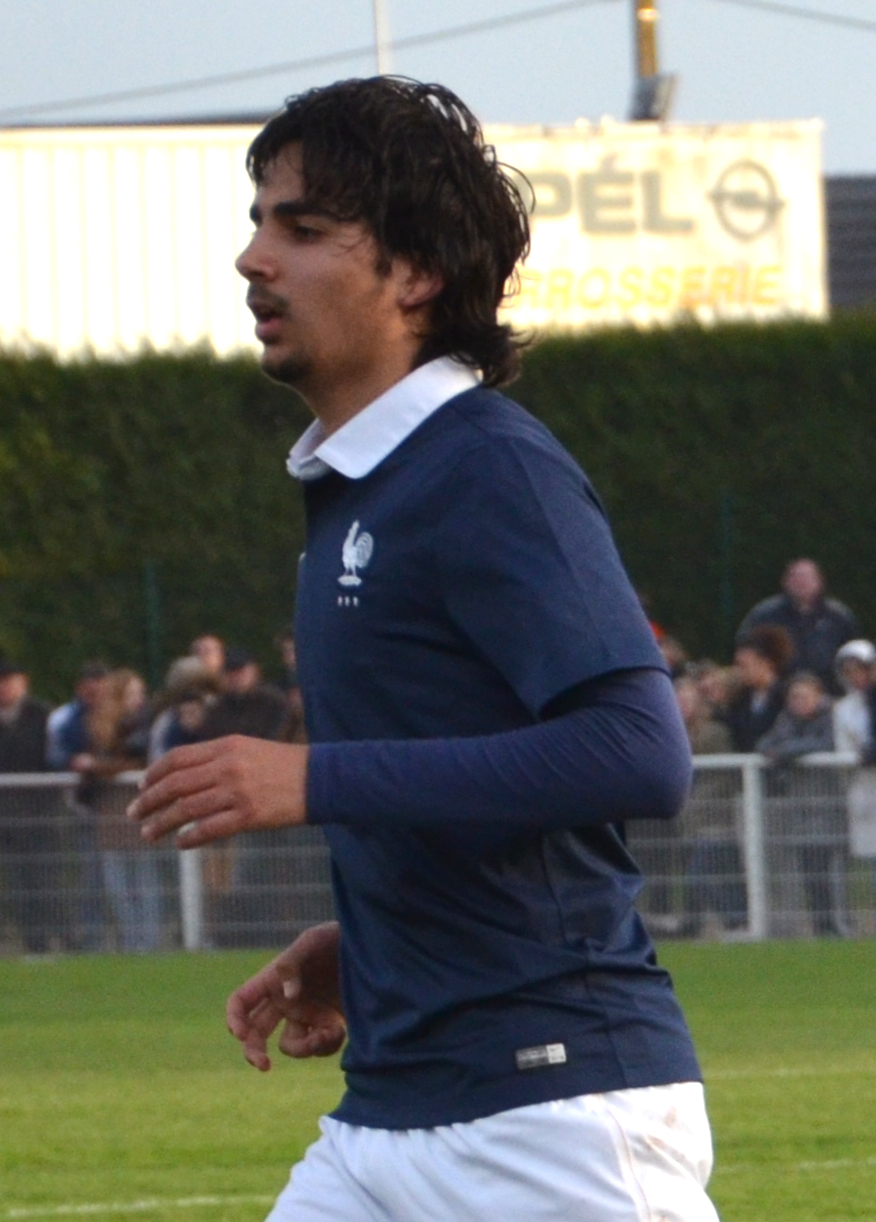
- Kılıç in 2015

Personal information
- Full name: Samed Hakan Kılıç
- Date of birth: 28 January 1996 (age 30)
- Place of birth: Pontault-Combault, France
- Height: 1.80 m (5 ft 11 in)
- Position: Central midfielder

Team information
- Current team: Thionville
- Number: 8

Youth career
- 2005–2008: Noisy-le-Grand FC
- 2008–2011: Bussy-Saint-Georges FC
- 2011–2014: Auxerre

Senior career*
Years	Team	Apps	(Gls)
2013–2017	Auxerre B	33	(4)
2014–2017	Auxerre	59	(2)
2017–2020	Samsunspor	17	(1)
2018–2019	→ Cholet (loan)	24	(0)
2020–2021	Turgutluspor	30	(1)
2021–2022	Chambly	23	(0)
2022–2023	Virton	5	(0)
2023–2024	Chambly	24	(1)
2024–2025	Fethiyespor	28	(2)
2025–	Thionville	32	(0)

International career
2012	France U16	9	(1)
2012–2013	France U17	6	(0)
2013–2014	France U18	5	(1)
2014–2015	France U19	13	(1)
2015–2016	France U20	6	(0)
- * Club domestic league appearances and goals as of 5 September 2026

Samed Hakan Kılıç (born 28 January 1996) is a French professional footballer who plays as a central midfielder for Ligue 3 club Thionville. His surname is commonly spelt as Kilic by the French media.

== Club career ==
In August 2021, Kılıç joined Championnat National club Chambly.

== International career ==
He is a former France youth international having earned caps at under-16, under-17, under-18, and under-19 level.

== Personal life ==
Kılıç's parents are from Niğde, Turkey.
