= Sipa Press =

French photo agency

- Type: Sàrl
- Industry: News media
- Founded: Paris (1973)
- Headquarters: Paris, France
- Key people: Heinrich Ollendiek (CEO, editor-in-chief)
- Products: Newspictures
- Revenue: $15.5 million (2010)
- Number of employees: 91
- Parent: DAPD News Agency
- Website: www.sipa.com

Sipa Press is a French photo agency based in Paris.

== Overview ==
It was founded in 1973 by the Turkish news photographer and photojournalist Gökşin Sipahioğlu together with American writer Phyllis Springer, concentrating their focus on photojournalism from the beginning.

Sipa Press is a French-based photo agency distributing up to 6,000 news pictures every day to customers in more than 40 countries worldwide. It covers politics, economy, entertainment, and sports. 20 million pictures are filed in Sipa's archives and 12 million in its digital database.

The editorial staff consists of 91 members, and about 600 correspondents contribute to the service. Most significant partnerships exist with Associated Press, Rex Features in the UK, and La Presse in Italy.

In July 2011 Sipa Press was taken over by the German DAPD News Agency, the managing director being Heinrich Ollendiek. In October 2012, DAPD filed for insolvency protection, with all six of its subsidiaries declaring bankruptcy.
