= Anaïs Baydemir =

French journalist and weather presenter

- Born: 20 July 1979 (age 46); Compiègne, Oise, France
- Occupations: Journalist; Weather presenter
- Years active: 2002–present
- Spouse: Mathieu Saby (m. 2019)
- Children: 2

Anaïs Baydemir (born 20 July 1979) is a French journalist and weather presenter who has worked for the French national public television channel France 2 at the conclusion of news bulletins since 2013. She has also worked for the television stations i>Télé, La Chaîne Météo, France 3, Eurosport, NT1, Infosport+ and Equidia throughout her career.

== Biography ==
Baydemir was born in Compiègne, Oise, France on 20 July 1979 and is of Turkish descent. She was raised in a modest household. Baydemir graduated with a Baccalaureate in college and attended to earn her Brevet de technicien supérieur in commercial action in Compiègne. In 2000, she moved to Paris to study journalism at École supérieure de journalisme de Paris. Baydemir made an appearance in the 2000 Yzabel Dzisky short film Tapis.

Upon her leaving school in 2002, she earned an internship at the pay television channel i>Télé after she did a series of jobs and was offered the role of an editorial assistant, working with journalists and reporters. Baydemir presented weather reports for the channel alongside Bruce Toussaint from June to September of that year as well as Canal+ from that September to November. She was employed by La Chaîne Météo to conduct weather reports for eight months between the period of September 2003 to April 2004 and again between 2007 and 2011. In December 2004, Baydemir reported on Miss World 2004 and presented it for TVSF. She went on to present Keno for the Française des Jeux on France 3 from 2005 to 2010, and was a journalist and presenter at La Chaîne Météo from 2007 to 2012. Baydemir also provided commentary on sports for Infosport+ for two months in 2006, for Eurosport (Lundi foot as a columnist and a presenter), France 3 (from 2009 in her public service television debut on the programme En course covering horse racing), NT1 (Jeux actu between 2008 and 2012) and Equidia (La Culturelle from 2011 to 2013).

On 31 October 2012, she joined the staff of France 2 presenting weather forecasts on the Télématin breakfast programme from Mondays to Fridays and went on to present the weather on the news bulletins 13 heures at 1:00 pm and Journal de 20 heures at 8:00 pm. Two years later, she began presenting the Thursday edition of C'est Hippique on Equidia Life. In 2019, Baydemir was cast in the Arnaud Lemort film Ibiza. She was on maternity leave from 14 November 2019 to 20 July 2020, and again from 11 October 2021 until 27 May 2022.

== Personal life ==
She has been married to the osteopath and physiotherapist Mathieu Saby since September 2019. They have two children. Baydemir is fluent in English and Turkish.
