= Muratt Atik =

Turkish actor

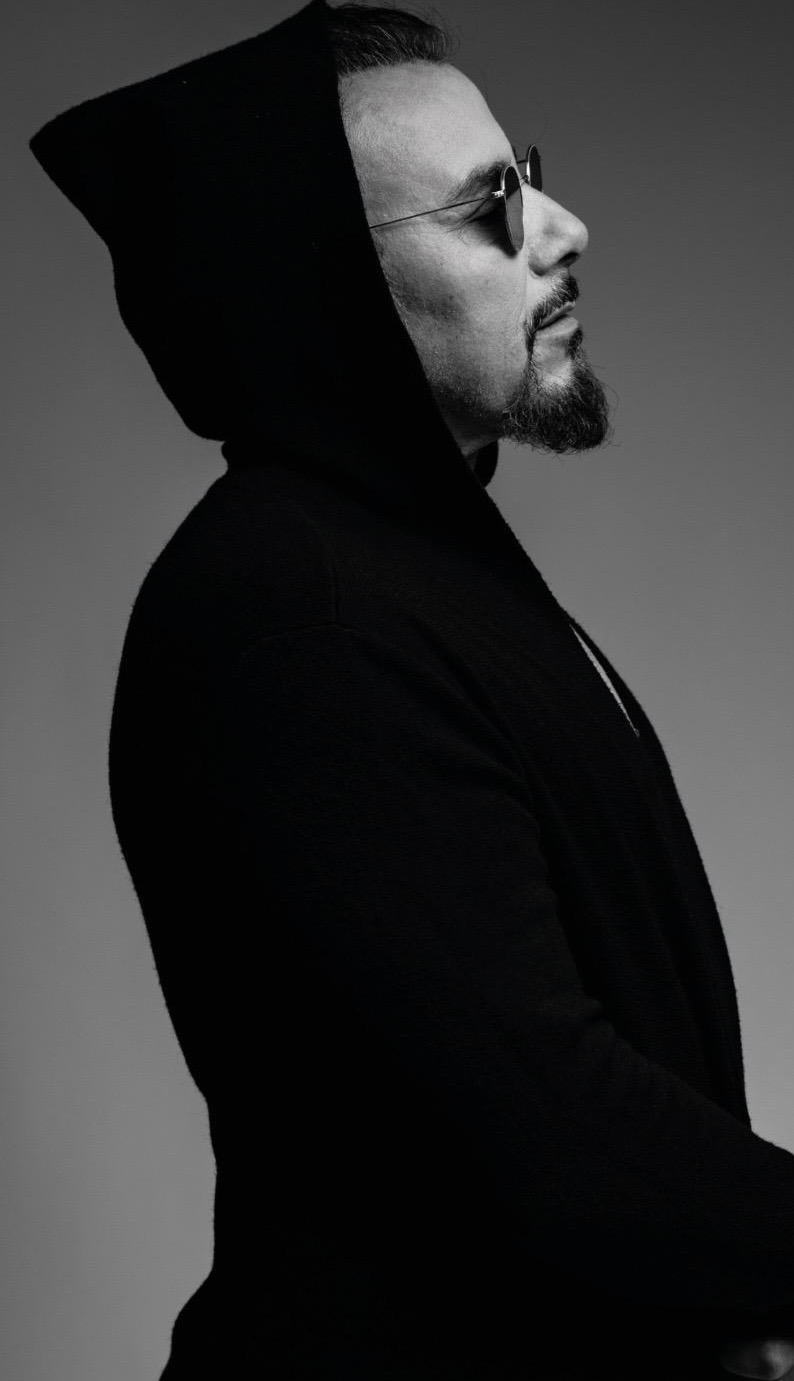
- Occupations: Actor, Producer, Showrunner

Muratt Atik is a French-Turkish-English speaking actor and producer. Atik has been nominated for several awards as a French personality and in 2008 won Personality of the Year at the Trophées de la Nuit. Also in 2014 he won Outstanding Contribution to Parisian Entertainment at the Monaco Globes de Crystal. He trained at the Conservatoire National d'Art Dramatique. He was first a theatre actor then moved to cinema and television. He is known for his roles as Cengizhan in Eve Donus (2015 - ATVTurkey) and also as Captain Ahmet in DARBE (2014). He also appeared as a guest as Guvercin Ali in Kertenkele (2014 ATVTurkey). He played Le Turc in the French movie Paris Countdown (2013), as Aslan in Borderline, and as Milo in French TV Show Braquo (2009).

Muratt Atik works between Turkey (Istanbul) and France (Paris). He is also a successful businessman and French TV personality.

== Early life ==
Muratt Atik was born 18 November in Bursa, Turkey. He is the oldest child in his family. He studied at the Conservatoire National d’Art Dramatique and in Studio 34 School of Cinema, workshops with Julien Bertheau for theatre and Patricia Sterling for cinema.

== Career ==
=== Acting ===
Muratt Atik started his career as a theatre actor starring in numerous theatre productions : La Visite, Danton et Robespierre, Le Barbier de Séville, Les Émigrés, Les Aveux les plus Doux, Les Aveux les plus Fous. His most recent productions include Cabaret Canaille and Festival d’Anjou.

He portrayed Cengizhan in Eve Donus on ATVTurkey. He appeared in various TV shows in France such as Stars et Fortunes on M6, Le Droit de Savoir TF1, Canal, Les Grandes Vacances, Toutaz on France 4, La Folie Paradise on Paris Première, Tellement People on NRJ 12 and Tellement Vrai on NRJ Paris.

=== Producing ===
Muratt Atik owns the cabaret Pink Paradise created by Cathy and David Guetta. He published a book about his cabaret (Strip-Tease, Editions de La Martinière) and produced 13 episodes of the docuseries Danse Privée for French network Planet. Atik produced the Pink Paradise Revue, a live show released on French networks Paris Premiere and Fashion TV. He produced BurlesQ in 2013.

== Personal life ==
Muratt Atik married Joanna Atik. They have two children and reside in Paris, France.

== Works ==
=== Cinema and TV ===
YEAR	Title	Role	Note	
2015	Eve Donus	Cengizhan	TV show	Kartal Cidamli
2014	Darbe	Captain Ahmet	Movie	Yasin Uslu
2014	Kertenkele	Guvercin Ali	TV show	Kartal Cidamli
2014	Borderline	Aslan	Movie	Olivier Marchal
2013	Le Jour Attendra	Le Turc	Movie	Edgar Marie
2012	Taken 2	Mirko	Movie	Olivier Megaton
2012	Vucut	Kursat	Movie	Mustafa Nori
2009	Braquo	Milo	TV show	Olivier Marchal

=== Theatre ===
Title	Role	Venue
Cabaret Canaille	Mister M	La Pépinière
Cabaret Canaille	Mister M	Festival d'Anjou
Les Émigrés	XX	Théâtre Dejazet
Les Aveux les plus Doux	Arthur	Comédie de Touraine
Les Aveux les plus Fous	Roger	Théâtre Dejazet
La Visite	L'Homme	Comédie de Touraine
Danton et Robespierre	Danton	Comédie de Touraine
Le Barbier de Séville	Figaro	Comédie de Touraine
Lorenzacio	Lorenzo	Sébastopol - Lille
Les Caprices de Marianne	Octave	Sébastopol - Lille
Les Fourberies de Scapin	Scapin	Sébastopol - Lille
L'Avare	La Flèche	C.A.D.O Orléans
Ruy Blas	Don César de Bazan	C.A.D.O Orléans
