= Ozkan Cetiner =

French footballer (born 2000)

Personal information
- Date of birth: 25 November 2000 (age 25)
- Place of birth: Saint-Quentin, France
- Height: 1.78 m (5 ft 10 in)
- Position: Midfielder

Team information
- Current team: İskenderunspor
- Number: 66

Senior career*
Years	Team	Apps	(Gls)
2018–2020	Saint-Quentin	38	(3)
2020–2021	Dunkerque	2	(0)
2021–2022	Olympic Charleroi	6	(0)
2022–2023	AC Amiens	22	(7)
2023	Compiègne	8	(2)
2024–2025	Chantilly	42	(0)
2025–	İskenderunspor	10	(0)
- * Club domestic league appearances and goals as of 26 November 2025

Ozkan Cetiner (Turkish: Özkan Çetiner; born 25 November 2000) is a French professional footballer who plays as a midfielder for Turkish TFF 2. Lig club İskenderunspor.

== Professional career ==
On 8 June 2020, Cetiner signed a professional contract with Dunkerque. Cetiner made his professional debut with Dunkerque in a 1-0 Ligue 2 win over Valenciennes on 19 September 2020.

On 3 September 2021, he moved to Belgium and signed with the third-tier club Olympic Charleroi.

== Personal life ==
Born in France, Cetiner is of Turkish descent.
