= Burak Kardeş =

Turkish footballer

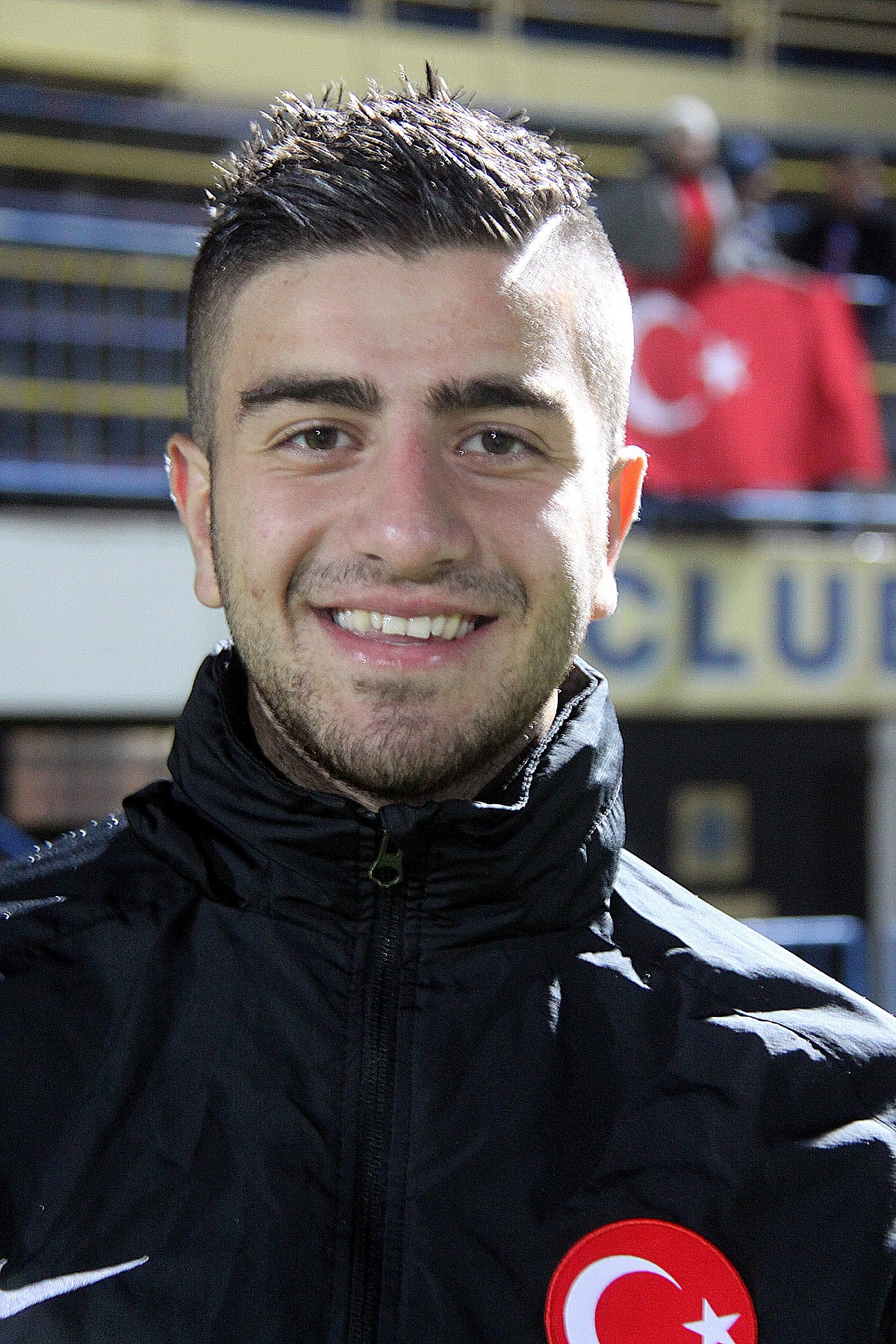
- Kardeş in 2013

Personal information
- Full name: Burak Kardeş
- Date of birth: 22 March 1994 (age 32)
- Place of birth: Beverloo, Belgium
- Height: 1.89 m (6 ft 2 in)
- Positions: Full-back; centre-back

Team information
- Current team: Turkse FC
- Number: 10

Youth career
- Turkse FC
- 2013–2014: PSV Eindhoven

Senior career*
Years	Team	Apps	(Gls)
2013–2014	PSV Eindhoven	0	(0)
2013–2014	Jong PSV	10	(0)
2014–2015	Osmanlıspor A2	9	(0)
2014–2015	→ Bugsaşspor (loan)	10	(0)
2015–2017	Roda JC U21		
2017	Thes Sport		
2017–2020	KVK Wellen		
2020–2022	Eendracht Termien	30	(0)
2022–2023	FC Anadol	12	(0)
2023–	Turkse FC	17	(0)

International career
2010	Turkey U16	2	(0)
2010	Turkey U17	2	(0)
2012	Turkey U18	2	(0)
2012	Turkey U19	1	(1)
2013	Turkey U20	3	(0)
2013	Turkey U21	1	(0)
- * Club domestic league appearances and goals as of 17:15, 13 February 2025 (UTC)

Burak Kardeş (born 22 March 1994) is a professional footballer who plays for Turkse FC. Born in Belgium, he represented Turkey at all international youth levels up to under-21.

He made his professional debut as Jong PSV player in the Dutch Eerste Divisie on 3 August 2013 against Sparta Rotterdam.
