= Khashoggi =

Khashoggi (Arabic: خاشقجي, romanized: Ḵāšuqjī) is an Arabic surname of Turkish origin (from kaşıkçı, "spoonmaker"). Notable people with the surname include:

- Adnan Khashoggi (1935–2017), Saudi businessman, son of Muhammad Khashoggi
- Emad Khashoggi (born 1968), Saudi businessman, son of Adil Khashoggi and grandson of Muhammad Khashoggi
- Jamal Khashoggi (1958–2018), murdered Saudi journalist and dissident, son of Ahmad Khashoggi and grandson of Muhammad Khashoggi
- Muhammad Khashoggi (1889–1978), Saudi medical doctor, personal doctor of founder of Saudi Arabia King Abdulaziz Al Saud
- Nabila Khashoggi (born 1962), American businesswoman, actress, and philanthropist, daughter of Adnan Khashoggi
- Riad Khashoggi (1941–2012) Saudi industrial engineer, brother of Jamal Khashoggi
- Samira Khashoggi (1935–1986), Saudi novelist, daughter of Muhammad Khashoggi, and mother of Dodi Fayed
- Soheir Khashoggi (born 1947), Saudi novelist, daughter of Muhammad Khashoggi
