= Triad International =

Swiss private investment corporation

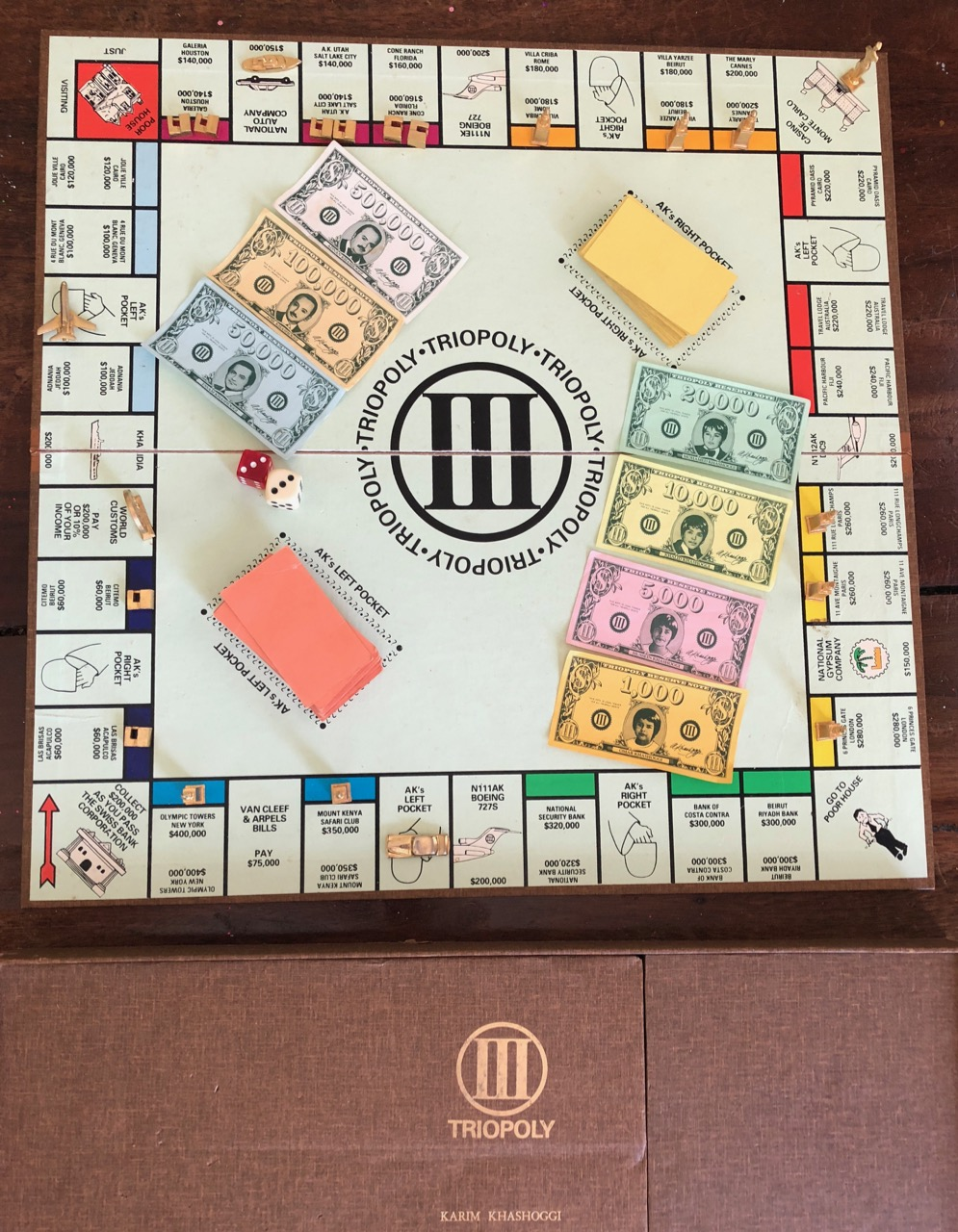
- Triopoly board game
- Company type: Private company
- Industry: Investments
- Founded: 1960s
- Founder: Adnan Khashoggi
- Headquarters: Geneva, Switzerland
- Area served: Worldwide
- Key people: Adnan Khashoggi
- Products: Family investments
- Owner: Khashoggi family
- Subsidiaries: Numerus including Triad America, Triad Condas International, Triad Holding Co, Triad Asia Ltd, Triad Management, Triad Properties, Triad Energy, Triad Technology, and Triad Financial resources

Triad International is a Swiss multi-national private investment corporation that was owned by the late Adnan Khashoggi. Its investments include many notable properties and businesses throughout the world. The company consisted of subsidiary companies, including Triad Management, Triad Properties, Triad Energy, Triad Technology, and Triad Financial resources.

The global span of the businesses prompted the creation by the Khashoggi family of a board-game called Triopoly which was modelled after the classic game of Monopoly. The various game tiles represented properties and companies owned by Khashoggi and his Triad corporation. The game was manufactured and given to family and friends.

== History ==
Triad International was formed in the early 1960s, and as it grew, it spanned over five continents. The company holdings included hotels, shopping centers, banks, oil refineries, a computer manufacturer, a gold mine, construction companies, car and truck franchises, and a professional sports team, the Utah Jazz.

The company was headquartered in Geneva, Switzerland, with its subsidiary companies located in the United States, Canada, and Saudi Arabia.

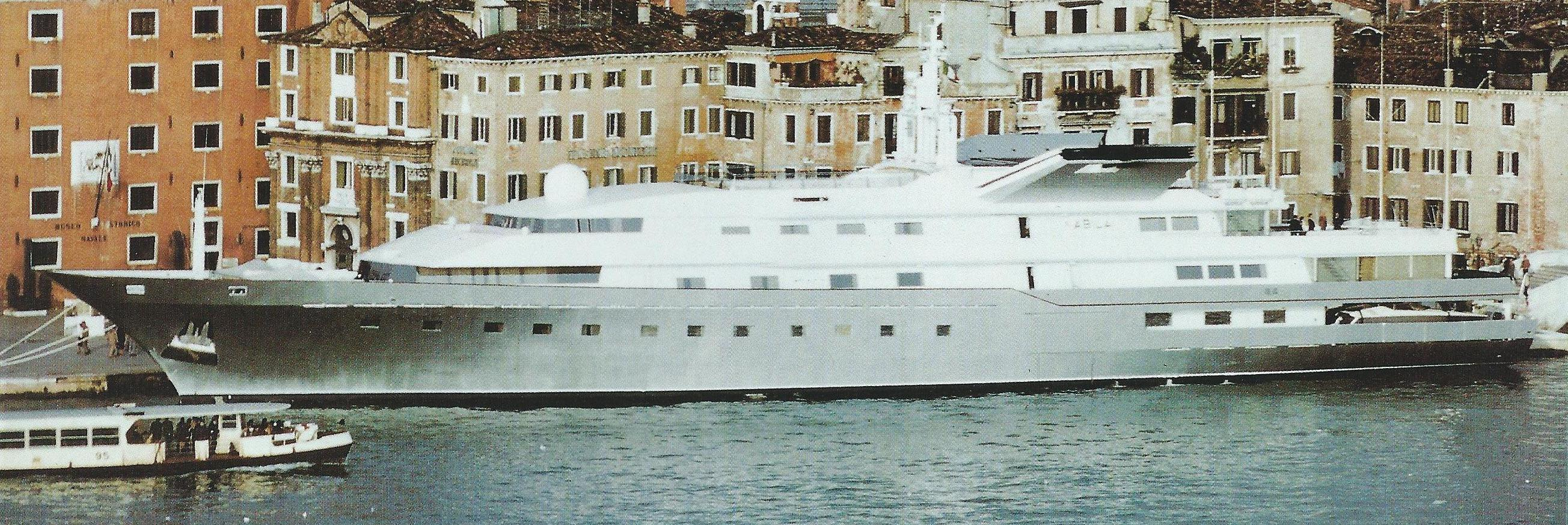
Khashoggi's super-yacht Nabila

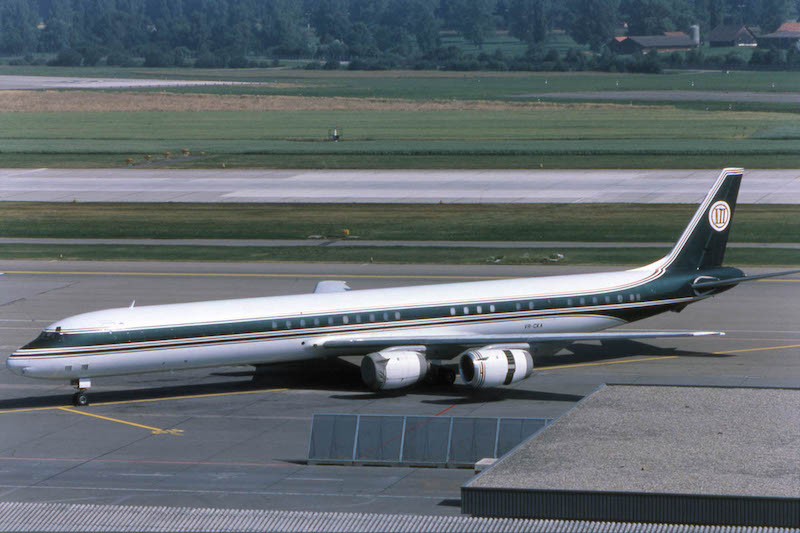
Khashoggi's DC-8 Jet

Khashoggi, through Triad, owned the Mount Kenya Safari Club, known as Ol Pejeta Conservancy, a 90,000 acre preserve at the foot of Mount Kenya, San Francisco Town Center East, a $250 million property, Long Beach Edgington Oil, a $250 million per year oil refinery, Santa Ana-based ATV computer systems, Arizona, Colorado Land & Cattle company, Security National bank in Walnut Creek, California, Barrick gold mine in Toronto, Canada, Saudi Arabian Kenworth, Chrysler and Fiat car and truck dealerships, the National Gypsum company in Saudi Arabia, and Sahuaro Petroleum in Phoenix, Arizona.

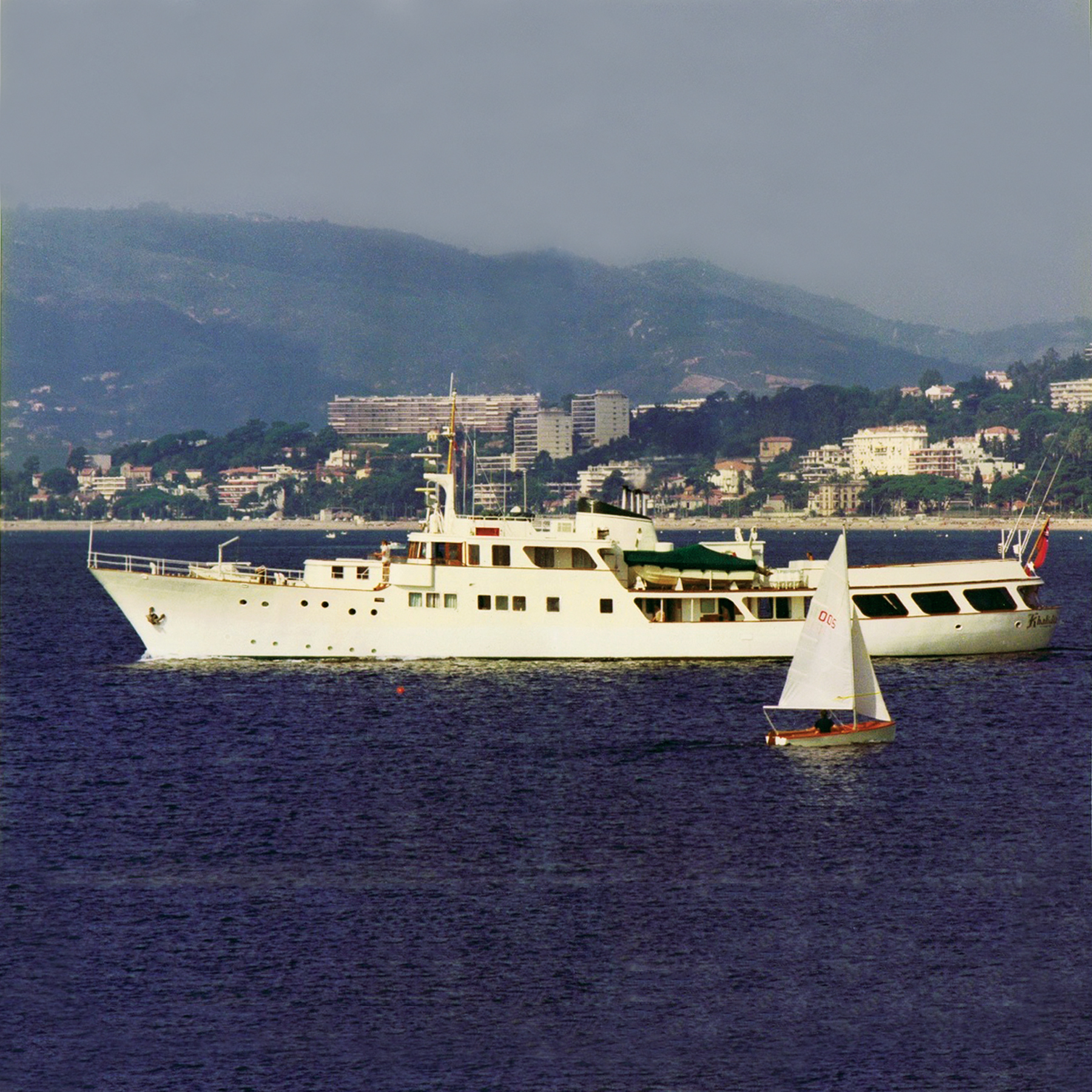
Khashoggi's yacht Khalidia

The company also had major financial interests in Lloyd's of London, the Manera company, Las Brisas Resort in Acapulco, Mexico, the Houston Galleria, National car rental, Pyramid Oasis in Cairo, Egypt, Travelodge Australia, Pacific Harbor hotel in Fiji, Beirut Riyadh bank, and the bank of Contra Costa.

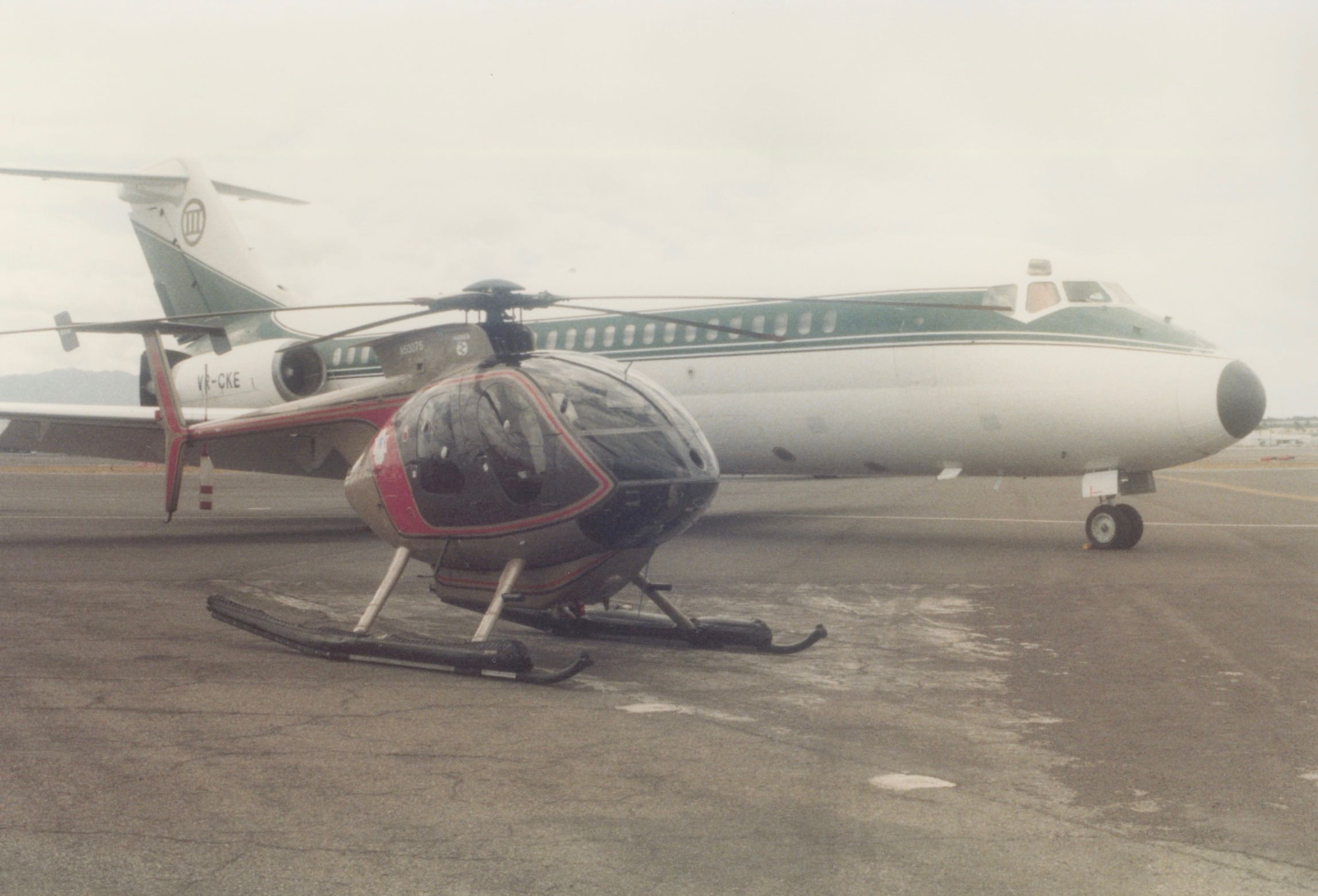
Khashoggi's DC-9 Jet and Helicopter

Khashoggi's Triad real estate holdings included private residences in Beirut in Lebanon, Jeddah and Riyadh in Saudi Arabia, Geneva in Switzerland, Cairo in Egypt, Salt Lake City in Utah, Cone Ranch in Florida, Rome in Italy, Paris and Cannes in France, London in England, and a multi-floor penthouse in Olympic Tower in New York.

Khashoggi owned several private jets, and super-yachts through Triad, including a McDonnell Douglas DC-8 and DC-9, three Boeing 727s, and several smaller business jets and helicopters. His three super-yachts, the Nabila, the Mohammadia, and the Khalidia, were named after his children, Nabila, Mohammed and Khalid.

Aircraft manufacturer Northrop sued Triad over alleged corrupt business practices.
