= Emad Khashoggi =

Saudi businessman (born 1968)

- Born: 25 March 1968 (age 57); Beirut, Lebanon
- Father: Adil Khashoggi
- Relatives: Dodi Fayed (cousin); Jamal Khashoggi (cousin); Nabila Khashoggi (cousin); Samira Khashoggi (aunt); Soheir Khashoggi (aunt); Adnan Khashoggi (uncle); Muhammad Khashoggi (grandfather)

Emad Khashoggi (Arabic: عماد خاشقجي; born 25 March 1968) is a Saudi businessman and the head of COGEMAD. He initiated the Château Louis XIV development project in Louveciennes, France.

== Biography ==
Emad Khashoggi was born in Lebanon's capital Beirut. His father, Adil Khashoggi, has headed up several property developments in Saudi Arabia. His grandfather, Muhammad Khashoggi was of Turkish origin from Kayseri and the personal physician to King Abdulaziz Al Saud. Emad Khashoggi is also the nephew of businessman Adnan Khashoggi. His surname, Khashoggi, means "spoon maker" (Kaşıkçı) in the Turkish language.

== Projects ==
In 1989, Emad Khashoggi founded COGEMAD, a company that develops haute-couture estates and interiors. In the early 2000s, after several successful property developments in France and overseas, in particular the renovation of Château du Verduron and Palais Rose du Vésinet, he and his company set their sights on a new project, homage to the 17th century architecture and a true international showcase of the finest French craftsmanship: the Château Louis XIV.

In 2009, a plot of wooded land between Versailles and Marly-le-Roi was purchased and precipitated the project that reached completion three years following the start of the building works.

The design and development of the Château Louis XIV was the subject of a book published by the renowned French art magazine Connaissance des Arts.

In addition to the Château Louis XIV, Emad Khashoggi's past developments include the Palais Vénitien in Cannes (decor of French movie Möbius with actor Jean Dujardin) and the renovation of Pierre Balmain's former apartment in the prestigious Jean Walter building complex in Paris.
