= Soheir Khashoggi =

Egyptian-born Saudi Arabian novelist

- Born: 1947 (age 78–79); Alexandria, Egypt
- Education: American University of Beirut
- Occupation: Writer
- Children: 4
- Parent: Muhammad Khashoggi (father)
- Relatives: Adnan Khashoggi (brother); Samira Khashoggi (sister); Dodi Fayed (nephew); Jamal Khashoggi (nephew); Nabila Khashoggi (niece); Emad Khashoggi (nephew)
- Website: soheirkhashoggi.com

Soheir Khashoggi (Arabic: سهير خاشقجي, born 1947) is an Egyptian-born Saudi Arabian novelist.

== Life ==
Khashoggi was born in Alexandria in 1947. Her father, Muhammad Khashoggi, was of Turkish origin, and the Saudi Royal physician for King Abdulaziz Al Saud, founder of the Kingdom of Saudi Arabia. Her family surname, Khashoggi, means "spoon maker" (Kaşıkçı) in the Turkish language.

Her brother was the arms dealer Adnan Khashoggi. She went to the American University of Beirut. She is a fine artist who has a degree from Beirut's Interior Design Center.

She divorced her second husband, and her first novel Mirage was published, in 1996 in nineteen languages. She lives in New York. Khashoggi has four daughters.

Her three books have been criticised by the academic Layla Al Maleh for reinforcing the American stereotypical view of Muslims and in particular Arab men. She sees the books as featuring male characters with an expectation of respect and oppressed women characters who resist but accept their position during Khashoggi's melodramatic stories.

== Works ==
- Mirage, 1999
- Nadia's Song, 2002
- Mosaic, 2002
