= Samira Khashoggi =

Saudi author and journalist (1935–1986)

- سميرة خاشقجي
- Born: 1935; Mecca, Saudi Arabia
- Died: March 1986 (aged 50–51)
- Occupation: Journalist
- Spouses: Mohamed Al-Fayed (m. 1954; div. 1956); Anas Yassin
- Children: Dodi Fayed; Jumana Yassin
- Parent: Muhammad Khashoggi (father)
- Relatives: Adnan Khashoggi (brother); Soheir Khashoggi (sister); Nabila Khashoggi (niece); Jamal Khashoggi (nephew); Emad Khashoggi (nephew)

Samira Khashoggi (Arabic: سميرة خاشقجي; 1935 – March 1986) was a Saudi Arabian progressive author, as well as the founder of Al Sharkiah magazine. She was the sister of the Saudi businessman Adnan Khashoggi. She was the first wife of Egyptian businessman Mohamed Al-Fayed and the mother of filmmaker Dodi Al-Fayed. She died of a heart attack in 1986 at the age of 51.

== Early life and education ==
Samira Khashoggi was born in 1935. she was the daughter of Muhammad Khashoggi, King Abdulaziz Al Saud's personal doctor and Samiha Ahmed, a Saudi woman of Syrian descent. She was educated in Egypt.

== Career ==
Khashoggi wrote, under the pseudonym "Samirah, Daughter of the Arabian Peninsula". Her books include Wadda't Amali (Farewell to my Dreams, 1958), Thekrayāt Dām'ah (Tearful Memories, 1963), Wara' Aldabab (Beyond the Cloud, 1971), Qatrat Min ad-Dumu' (Teardrops, 1979) and Barīq Aynaik (The Sparkle of Your Eyes). Since 1972, Al Sharkiah has been the leading monthly pan-Arab women's magazine.

In 1962, Khashoggi began to head a women's welfare association, Al Nahda, which was based in Riyadh and was the first organization targeted towards women in Saudi Arabia. She was one of the Saudi women who supported the education of girls.

== Personal life and death ==
Khashoggi met Mohamed Al Fayed on the beach in Alexandria through her brother, Saudi billionaire Adnan Khashoggi, and they married in 1954. The marriage lasted two years, and produced one child, Dodi Fayed. Khashoggi separated from Al Fayed just months after Dodi's birth and returned to Saudi Arabia. She then married Saudi ambassador Anas Yassin, and had her second child, Jumana Yassin, who is the editor in chief of Al Sharkiah magazine.

Khashoggi was the aunt of actress and producer Nabila Khashoggi and political journalist Jamal Khashoggi.

Khashoggi died in 1986.
