= Muhammad Khashoggi =

Saudi Arabian physician (1889–1978)

Mohamed Khashoggi
- محمد خالد خاشقچي
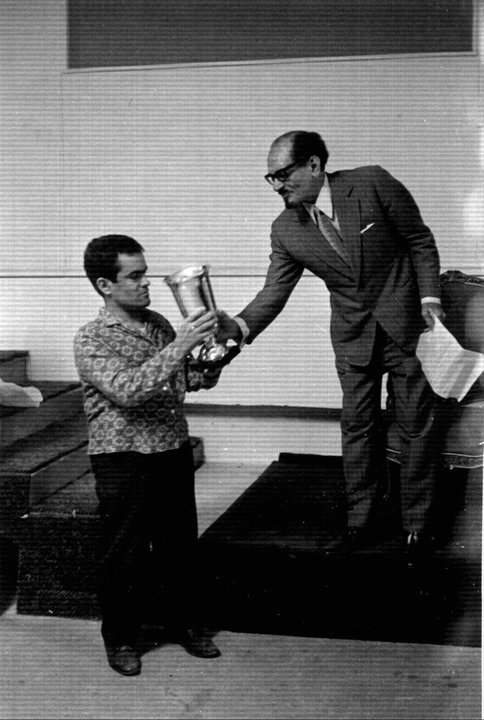
- Khashoggi presenting an award at a furniture factory in Condas, Beirut, Lebanon, owned by his son Essam Khashoggi
- Born: 1889; Medina, Hejaz Vilayet, Ottoman Empire (now in Saudi Arabia)
- Died: 16 November 1978 (aged 88–89); Riyadh, Saudi Arabia
- Education: University of Paris
- Occupation: Physician to King Abdulaziz
- Spouse(s): Bashira Mardini; Samiha Sitti; Khadejah Ismail
- Children: 14, including Adnan, Samira and Soheir

Muhammad Khaled Khashoggi (Arabic: محمد خالد خاشقچي) (1889 – 16 November 1978), also spelled as Mohamed Khaled Khashoggi, was a Saudi medical doctor. He was King Abdulaziz Al Saud's personal physician.

== Personal life ==
Khashoggi's remote Turkish ancestors made the Hajj from Kayseri to Mecca some four centuries earlier and decided to stay. Their family surname means "spoon maker" (Kaşıkçı) in Turkish. He married a Saudi woman of Syrian descent, Samiha Ahmed (Setti), and had seven children, Adnan Khashoggi, Samira Khashoggi, Essam Khashoggi, Adil Khashoggi, Assia Khashoggi, Ahmad Khashoggi and Soheir Khashoggi. His grandchildren include Dodi Fayed, Jamal Khashoggi, Emad Khashoggi, and Nabila Khashoggi.

== Biography ==
Khashoggi emigrated from Medina along with his family and brother Abdullah Khashoggi, muhtasib official, during the siege of Medina in 1918, settling in Damascus, where he studied medicine and became a surgeon. He went to Paris to study radiation therapy, then to Mecca to open a private clinic.

He moved to Riyadh to work in the Saudi Ministry of Health, where he brought in Egyptian doctors to work in Saudi Arabia. In the 1970s, he went to live in Beirut, Lebanon, but left for London in 1974 at the beginning of the Lebanese Civil War. Eventually he returned to Riyadh, where he died while undergoing surgery. He was buried in Medina.
