= John R. Bradley =

British author and journalist (1970–2020)

John R. Bradley (born 6 June 1970 — died October 2020) was a British author and journalist who has written on Middle East issues for numerous publications, including The Economist, The Forward, Newsweek, The New Republic, The Daily Telegraph, Prospect and The Independent. Beginning in early 2011 he was a regular contributor to The Daily Mail, The Spectator, where he highlighted Islamist trends in the Arab Spring. He has also appeared on television networks such as CNN, C-SPAN and Fox News.

Bradley was educated at University College London, Dartmouth College and Exeter College, Oxford.

According to an article published in May 2015 by Vice magazine, Bradley "has remov[ed] himself from public life due to ill health," a statement that confirms an earlier posting by Bradley himself on his personal website. He died in Mexico under unknown circumstances

== Career ==
Bradley is best known for his 2008 book Inside Egypt which accurately predicted the Egyptian uprising of January 2011 that ousted president Hosni Mubarak. In May 2011, Fareed Zakaria selected Inside Egypt as his "Book of the Week" on his GPS show:

“(This) book… in a strikingly prescient way… foretold the January revolution. (It) was banned by Mubarak’s regime — and understandably so! If you want to understand how Egypt got to this crossroads, read this book.”

For two and a half years beginning June 2001, he worked as a news editor and managing editor for the English-language daily newspaper Arab News in Saudi Arabia. Unlike other journalists until that time he was able to travel most of the country without a minder. Based on his experiences he wrote the book Saudi Arabia Exposed: Inside a Kingdom in Crisis. The book received considerable praise: a review in the New York Times, for example, stated that it provides "a highly informed, temperate and understanding account" of the country.

Bradley lectured on the Middle East at the Washington Institute for Near East Policy and Intelligence Squared in London.

=== Publications ===
- Saudi Arabia Exposed: Inside a Kingdom in Crisis (New York: Palgrave Macmillan, 2005).
- Inside Egypt: The Land of the Pharaohs on the Brink of a Revolution (New York: Palgrave Macmillan, 2008).
- Behind the Veil of Vice: The Business and Culture of Sex in the Middle East (New York: Palgrave Macmillan, 2010).
- After the Arab Spring: How the Islamists Hijacked the Middle East Revolt (Palgrave Macmillan, January 2012).
