= Adnan Khashoggi =

Saudi Arabian businessman and arms dealer (1935–2017)

- عدنان خاشقجي
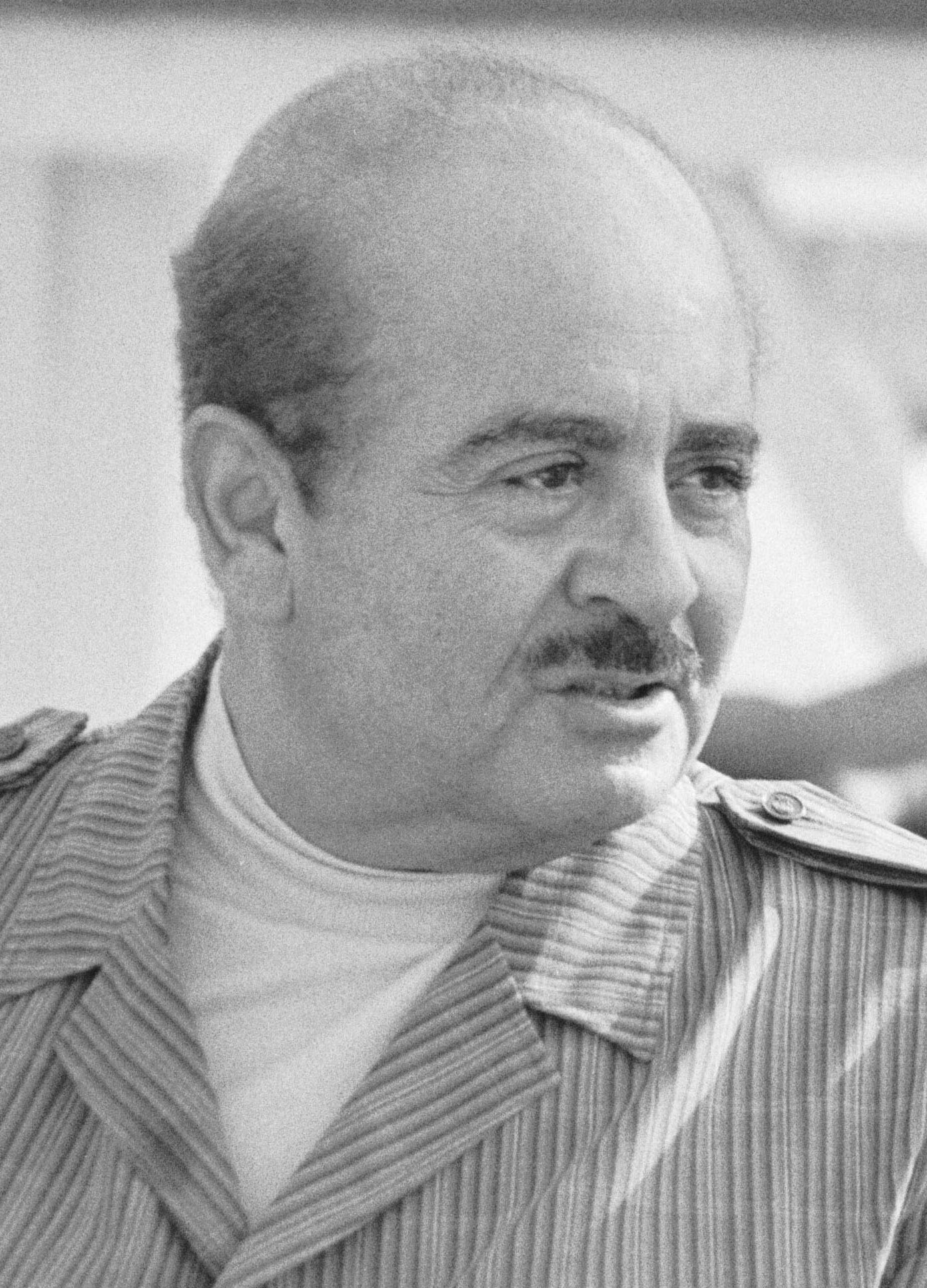
- Khashoggi in the 1980s
- Born: 25 July 1935; Mecca, Saudi Arabia
- Died: 6 June 2017 (aged 81); London, England
- Occupation: Businessman
- Spouses: Soraya Khashoggi (née Sandra Daly) (m. 1961; div. 1974) Lamia Khashoggi (née Laura Biancolini) (m. 1979) Shahpari Azam Zanganeh (m. 1991; div. 2014)
- Partner: Jill Dodd
- Children: 8, including Nabila Khashoggi
- Parent(s): Mohammad Khashoggi; Samiha Ahmed
- Relatives: Samira Khashoggi (sister) Mohamed Al-Fayed (brother-in-law) Soheir Khashoggi (sister); Dodi Fayed (nephew); Jamal Khashoggi (nephew); Emad Khashoggi (nephew)
- Website: www.adnankhashoggi.com

Adnan Khashoggi (Arabic: عدنان خاشقجي, romanized: ‘Adnān Khāshuqjī; 25 July 1935 – 6 June 2017) was a Saudi businessman and arms dealer known for his business dealings, extensive geopolitical influence, and opulent lifestyle, which earned him the moniker "The Great Gatsby of the Middle East". During his peak in the early 1980s, Khashoggi's net worth was estimated at around $4 billion, amassed through his pivotal role as an intermediary between Western defense companies and the Saudi government.

Khashoggi was the founder of Triad International Holding Company, which held diverse investments worldwide, including in luxury hotels, oil refineries, and real estate. Known for hosting lavish parties attended by celebrities and politicians, Khashoggi's lifestyle made him a media fixture and inspired popular culture, even influencing a song by Queen and appearing in shows like Lifestyles of the Rich and Famous.

== Early life and education ==
Khashoggi was born in Mecca, to Muhammad Khashoggi, an ethnic Turk who was King Abdul Aziz Al Saud's personal doctor, and Samiha Ahmed, a Saudi woman of Syrian origin. Khashoggi's sister was author Samira Khashoggi who married businessman Mohamed Al-Fayed and was the mother of Dodi Fayed. Another sister, Soheir Khashoggi, is a well-known Arab novelist (Mirage, Nadia's Song, Mosaic). He had two brothers, Essam Khashoggi and Adil Khashoggi, and he named Triad Corporation in reference to himself and his two brothers. He was a paternal uncle of murdered journalist Jamal Khashoggi. Khashoggi was educated at Victoria College in Alexandria, Egypt, and attended Chico State, Ohio State, and Stanford University. Khashoggi left his studies in order to pursue a business career.

== Personal life ==
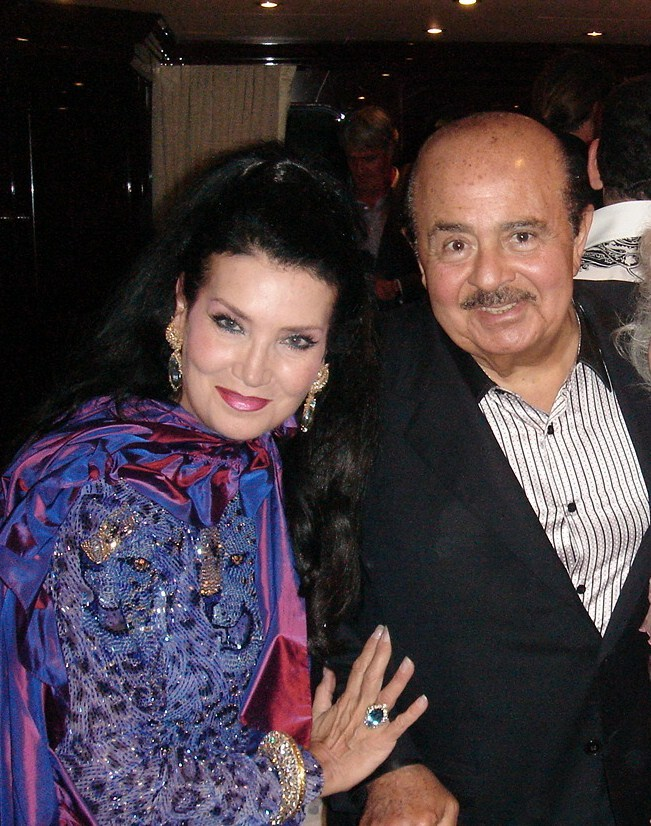
Khashoggi and wife Lamia

In 1961, Khashoggi married 20-year-old Englishwoman, Sandra Daly, who converted to Islam and took the name Soraya Khashoggi. Together they raised one daughter (Nabila) and four sons (Mohamed, Khalid, Hussein, and Omar). Another daughter, Petrina, was born after the couple divorced in 1974 and was assumed to be Adnan's, until a DNA test in 1999 revealed that her father was Conservative party politician Jonathan Aitken.

Khashoggi's second wife, Italian Laura Biancolini, (m. 1978-2017) changed her name to Lamia Khashoggi. She was seventeen when she met Adnan; together they had a son, Adnan's third legal wife was Shahpari Azam Zanganeh. Apart from his marriages, Khashoggi also maintained a harem, and it was reported that he had relationships with at least 12 women who were described as his "pleasure wives". One was Jill Dodd, a former model and fashion designer he met in 1980. Dodd has written a memoir titled The Currency of Love about their relationship.

In the 1980s, the Khashoggi family occupied one of the largest villa estates in Marbella, Spain, called Baraka, hosting lavish parties. Guests at these parties included film stars, pop celebrities and politicians such as former Canadian prime minister Pierre Trudeau. In 1985, celebrity reporter Robin Leach reported Khashoggi threw a five-day birthday party in Vienna for his eldest son, and in his heyday, Khashoggi spent $250,000 a day to maintain his lifestyle. Due to his extravagant lifestyle, he was called the Great Gatsby of the Middle East.

Another Khashoggi home was Ol Pejeta Conservancy, in Laikipia County, Kenya known at the time as the Mount Kenya Safari Club. His house has since been converted into a hotel which is run by Serena Hotels. Khashoggi continued to spend lavishly even when he encountered financial problems. His net worth was said to have been down to about $8 million in 1990. He died on 6 June 2017 while being treated for Parkinson's disease at St Thomas' Hospital in London. He was 81 years of age.

== Business career ==
Khashoggi's early years were spent among some of Saudi Arabia's most influential figures. "While attending school he met Hussein bin Talal, the future King of Jordan. It was at school that Khashoggi first learned the commercial value of facilitating a deal, bringing together a Libyan classmate whose father wanted to import towels with an Egyptian classmate whose father manufactured towels, earning US$1,000 for the introduction. Khashoggi's subsequent education at university would serve as a launchpad for his commercial career."

In one of his first big deals, a large construction company was experiencing difficulties with the trucks that it used on the shifting desert sands. Khashoggi, using money given to him by his father for a car, bought a number of Kenworth trucks, whose wide wheels made traversing the desert considerably easier. Khashoggi made his first US$250,000 leasing the trucks to the construction company, and became the Saudi Arabia–based agent for Kenworth.

In the 1960s and 1970s, Khashoggi helped bring together Western companies and the Saudi Arabian government to satisfy its infrastructure and defense needs. Between 1970 and 1975, Lockheed paid Khashoggi $106 million in commissions. His commissions started at 2.5% and eventually rose to as much as 15%. Khashoggi "became for all practical purposes a marketing arm of Lockheed. Khashoggi would provide not only an entrée but strategy, constant advice, and analysis", according to Max Helzel, then vice president of Lockheed's international marketing.

A commercial pioneer, he established companies in Switzerland and Liechtenstein to handle his commissions as well as developing contacts with notables such as CIA officers James H. Critchfield, Kim Roosevelt, Miles Copeland, and United States businessman Bebe Rebozo, a close associate of U.S. President Richard Nixon. His yacht, the Nabila, was the largest in the world at the time and was used in the James Bond film Never Say Never Again. After Khashoggi ran into financial problems he sold the yacht to the Sultan of Brunei, who in turn sold it for US$29 million to Donald Trump, who sold it for US$20 million to Prince Al-Waleed bin Talal as part of a deal to keep his Taj Mahal casino out of bankruptcy. Khashoggi gained influence with U.S. President Richard Nixon by donating US$200 million to his 1972 political campaign, through a friendly bank circumventing existing laws that prohibited such large sums from American corporations to political campaigns. Similar arrangements allowed Khashoggi to gain influence with important people throughout the world.

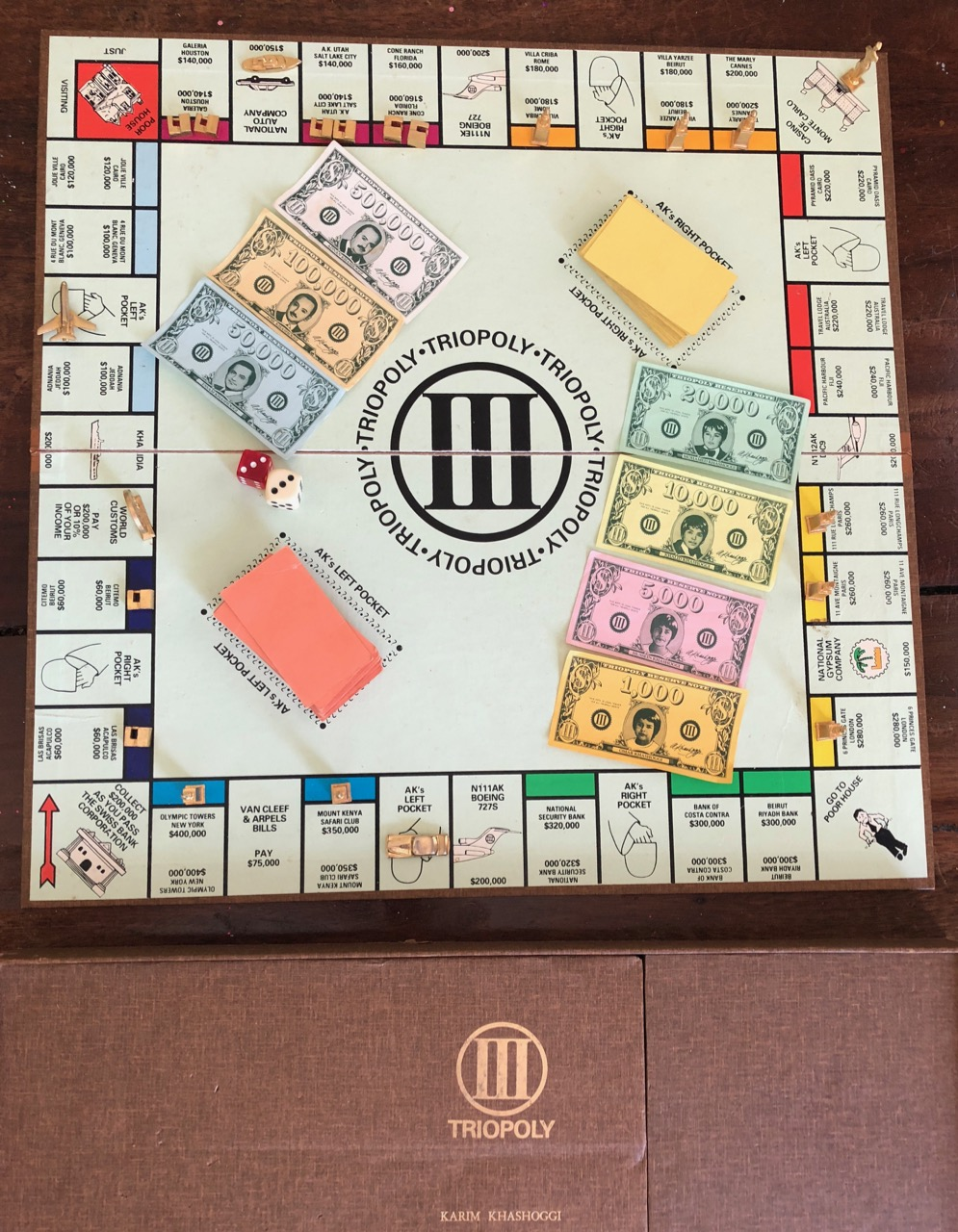
Khashoggi's custom board game of his properties

Khashoggi headed a company called Triad International Holding Company which among other things built the Triad Center in Salt Lake City, which later went bankrupt. He was famed as an arms dealer, brokering deals between US firms and the Saudi government, most actively in the 1960s and 1970s. In the documentary series The Mayfair Set, author Said Aburish states that one of Khashoggi's first deals was providing David Stirling with weapons for a covert mission in Yemen during the Aden Emergency in 1963. Among his overseas clients were defense contractors Lockheed Corporation (now Lockheed Martin Corporation), Raytheon, Grumman Aircraft Engineering Corporation and Northrop Corporation (the last two of which have now merged into Northrop Grumman).

=== Triad International ===
Triad International is a multinational private investment corporation that was owned by Khashoggi. It was named "Triad" after the three brothers, Adnan, Essam and Adil. Its investments include many notable properties and businesses throughout the world. The company consisted of subsidiary companies, including Triad Management, Triad Properties, Triad Energy, Triad Technology, and Triad Financial resources. The global span of the businesses prompted the creation, by the Khashoggi family, of a board-game called Triopoly which was modeled after the classic game of Monopoly. The various game tiles represented properties and companies owned by Khashoggi and his Triad corporation.

Triad International was formed in the early 1960s and as it grew spanned five continents. The company holdings included hotels, shopping centers, banks, oil refineries, a computer manufacturer, a gold mine, construction companies, car and truck franchises, and the Utah Jazz, a professional basketball team. The company was headquartered in Geneva, Switzerland, with its subsidiary companies located in the United States, Canada and Saudi Arabia.

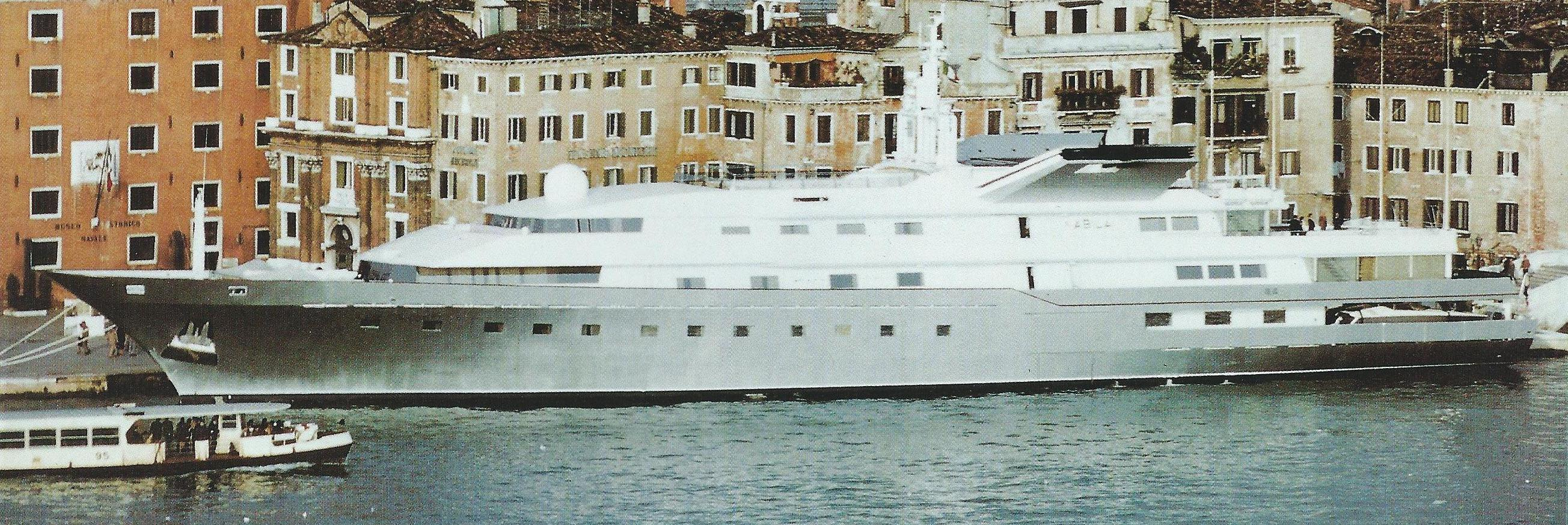
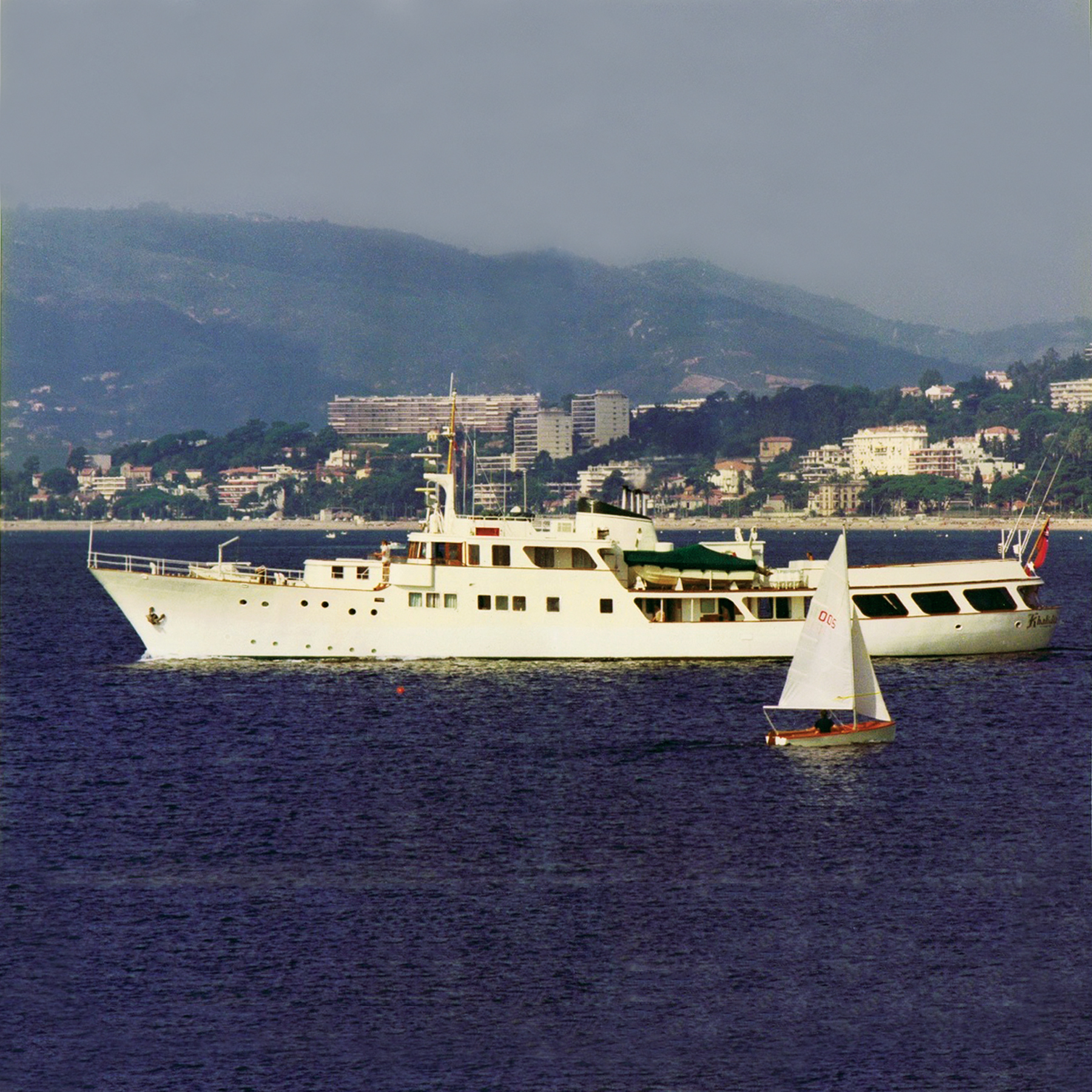
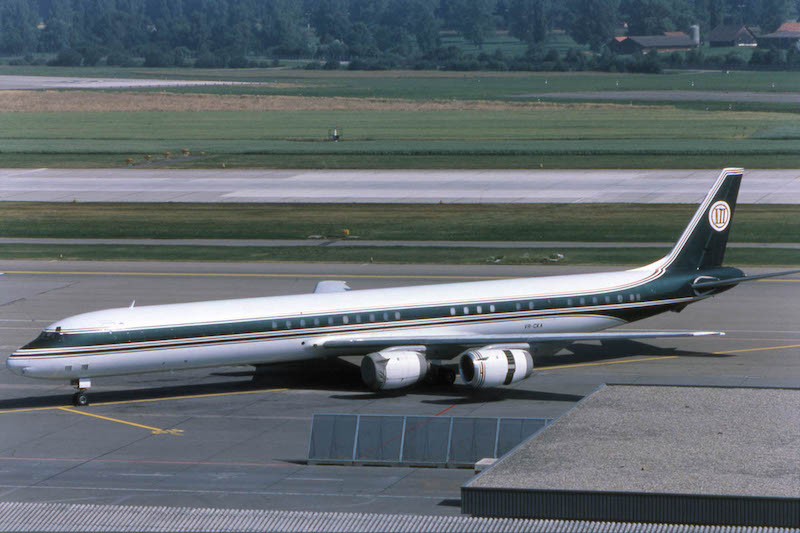
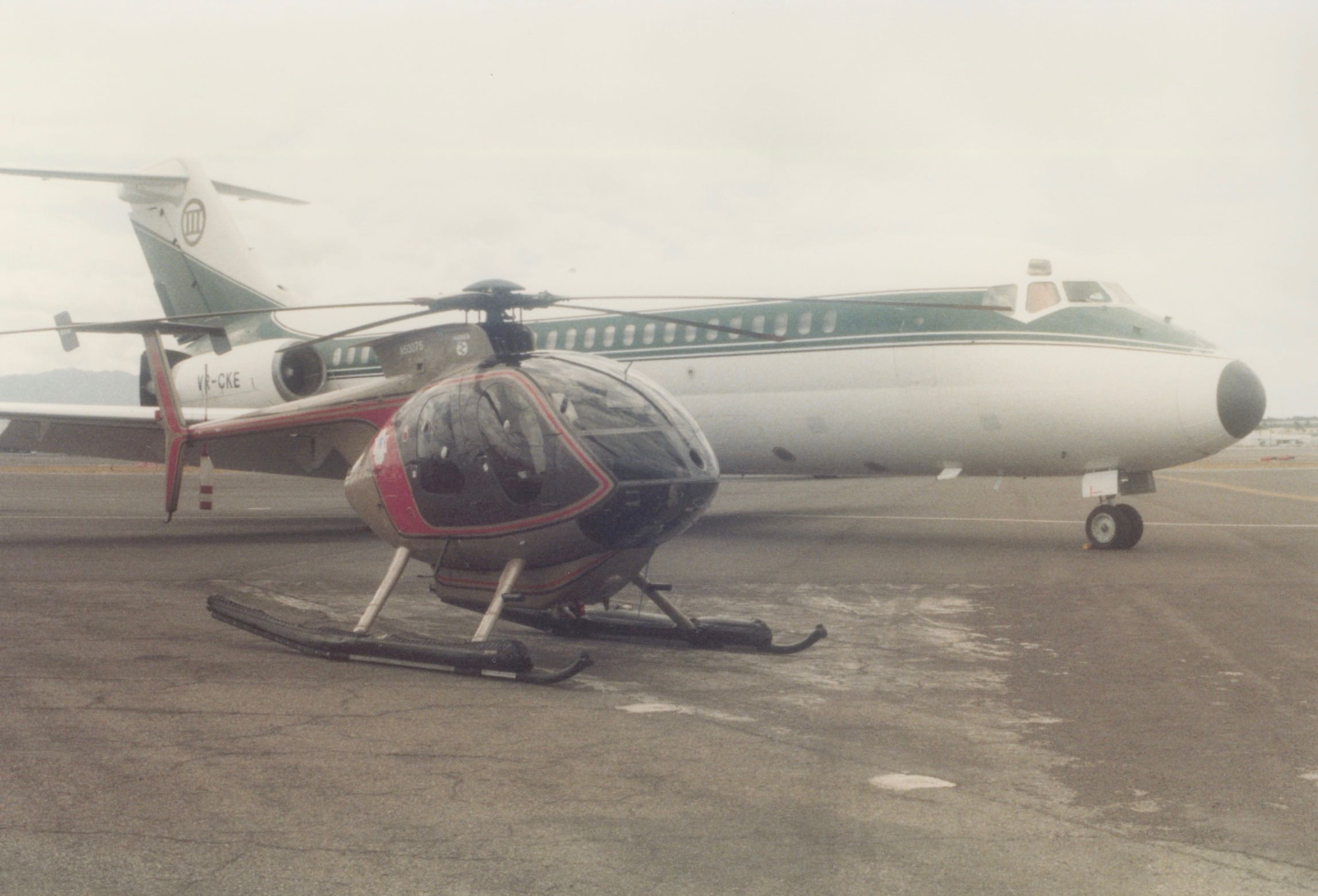
Top row: Khashoggi's yachts Nabila and Khalidia. Bottom row: selection of aircraft he owned.

Through Triad, Khashoggi owned the Mount Kenya Safari Club, known as Ol Pejeta Conservancy, a several hundred acre reserve at the foot of Mount Kenya, San Francisco Town Center East, US; a US$250 million property; Long Beach Edgington Oil a US$250 million per year oil refinery in the US; ATV computer systems, Santa Ana, Arizona, US; Colorado Land & Cattle company, Security National bank in Walnut Creek, California, US, Barrick gold mine in Toronto, Canada; Saudi Arabian Kenworth, Chrysler and Fiat car and truck dealerships; the National Gypsum company in Saudi Arabia, and Sahuaro Petroleum in Phoenix, Arizona, US. The company also had major financial interests in Lloyd's of London; the Manera company; Las Brisas Resort in Acapulco, Mexico; the Houston Galleria; National car rental company; Pyramid Oasis in Cairo, Egypt; Travel Lodge Australia; Pacific Harbor hotel in Fiji; Beirut Riyadh bank; and the bank of Contra Costa.

Khashoggi's Triad real estate holdings included private residences in Beirut; Jeddah; Riyadh; Geneva; Cairo; Salt Lake City, Utah; Cone Ranch, Florida; Rome; Paris; Cannes; London; and a multi-floor penthouse in Olympic Tower in New York. Khashoggi also owned several private jets, and super-yachts through Triad, including a McDonnell Douglas DC-8 and DC-9, three Boeing 727s, and several smaller business jets and helicopters. His three super-yachts, the Nabila, the Mohammadia, and the Khalidia, were named after his children, Nabila, Mohammed, and Khalid.

== Geopolitical involvement ==
During a famine caused by the Ethiopian Civil War, Khashoggi was directly involved in helping to organize and fund the top-secret Operation Moses in 1984 to airlift to safety 14,000 Ethiopian Jews from Sudan to Israel.

Khashoggi was implicated in the Iran–Contra affair as a key middleman in the arms-for-hostages exchange along with Iranian arms dealer Manucher Ghorbanifar and in a complex series of events was found to have borrowed money for these arms purchases from the Bank of Credit and Commerce International (BCCI) with Saudi and United States backing. His role in the affair created a related controversy when Khashoggi donated millions to the American University in Washington DC, to build a sports arena which would bear his name. Khashoggi was a member of the university's board of trustees from 1983 until his indictment on fraud and other charges in May 1989. Khashoggi was "principal foreign agent" of the United States and helped establish the supranational intelligence partnership known as the Safari Club.

During this period, Khashoggi was a financial client of financier and sex offender Jeffrey Epstein. In 1988, Khashoggi was arrested in Switzerland, accused of concealing funds, and held for three months. Khashoggi stopped fighting extradition when the U.S. prosecutors reduced the charges to obstruction of justice and mail fraud and dropped the more serious charges of racketeering and conspiracy. In 1990, a United States federal jury in Manhattan acquitted Khashoggi and Imelda Marcos, widow of the exiled Philippine President Ferdinand Marcos, of racketeering and fraud.

Khashoggi was a financier behind Genesis Intermedia, Inc. (formerly NASDAQ: GENI), a publicly traded Internet company based in the US. In 2006, Khashoggi was sued by the U.S. Securities and Exchange Commission for securities fraud. The case was dismissed in 2008, and Khashoggi did not admit or deny the allegations.

In January 2003, Seymour Hersh reported in The New Yorker magazine that former U.S. Assistant Secretary of Defense Richard Perle had a meeting with Khashoggi in Marseille in order to use him as a conduit between Trireme Partners, a private venture capital company of which he was one of three principals, and the Saudi government. At the time, Perle was chair of the Defense Policy Board Advisory Committee, a Defense Department advisory group, which provided him with access to classified information and a position to influence defense policy. Khashoggi told Hersh that Perle talked to him about the economic costs regarding a proposed invasion of Iraq. "'If there is no war,' he told me, 'why is there a need for security? If there is a war, of course, billions of dollars will have to be spent.'"

== Media ==
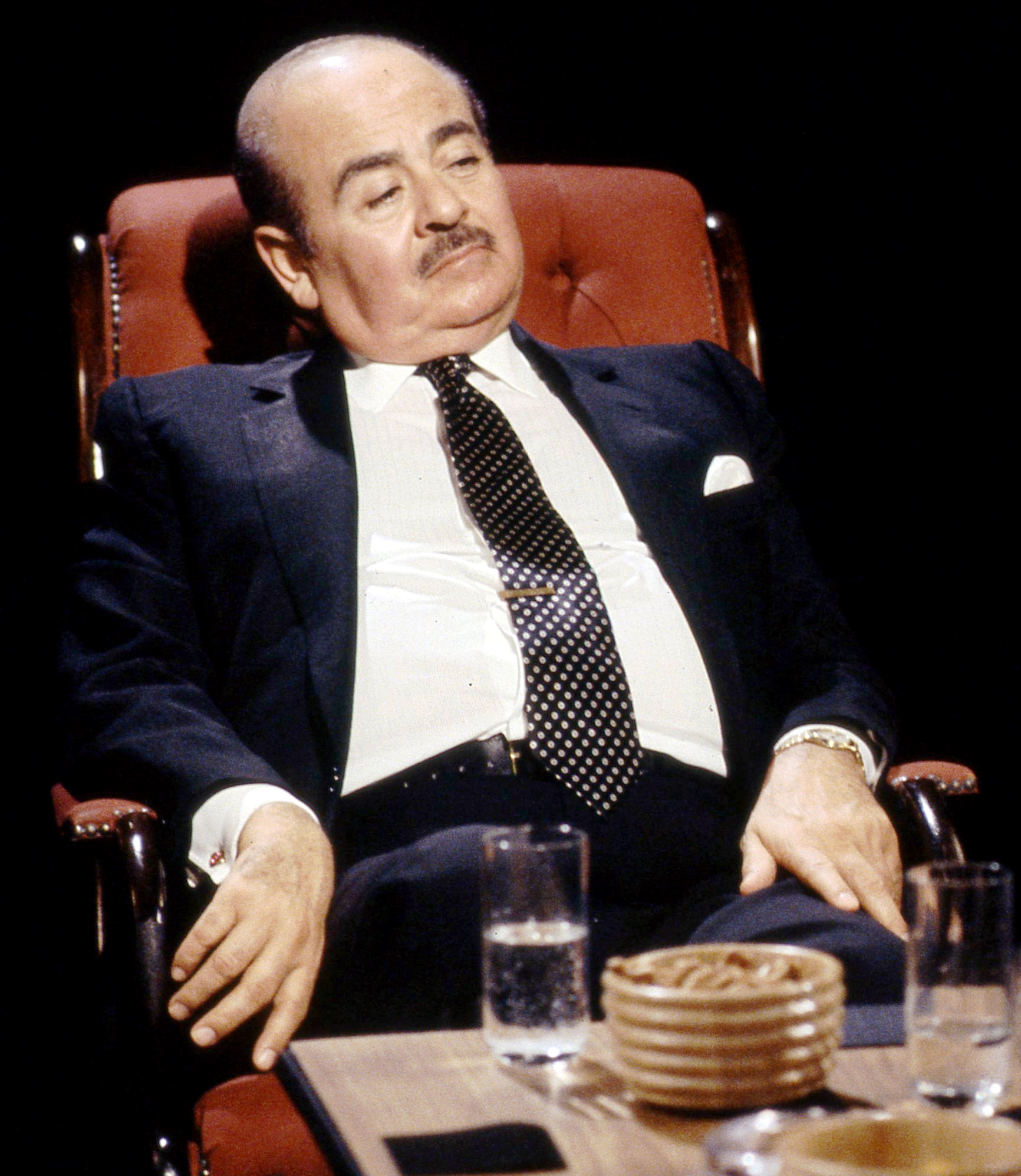
Khashoggi appearing on After Dark in 1991

Khashoggi's enormous yacht was the inspiration for Queen's song "Khashoggi's Ship". In 1991, Khashoggi made an extended appearance on the British television programme After Dark, discussing the Middle East alongside, among others, former Prime Minister Edward Heath and Lord Weidenfeld. Khashoggi also appeared in Lifestyles of the Rich and Famous in 1985 with host Robin Leach, which showcased Khashoggi's extravagant lifestyle. During his peak, Khashoggi was a well-known figure who frequently appeared in the press and media. He also appeared in various television shows, newspapers, and notable magazine covers such as Time and The Washington Post.

== See also ==
- Kamal Adham
