= Nabila Khashoggi =

Lebanese-American actress

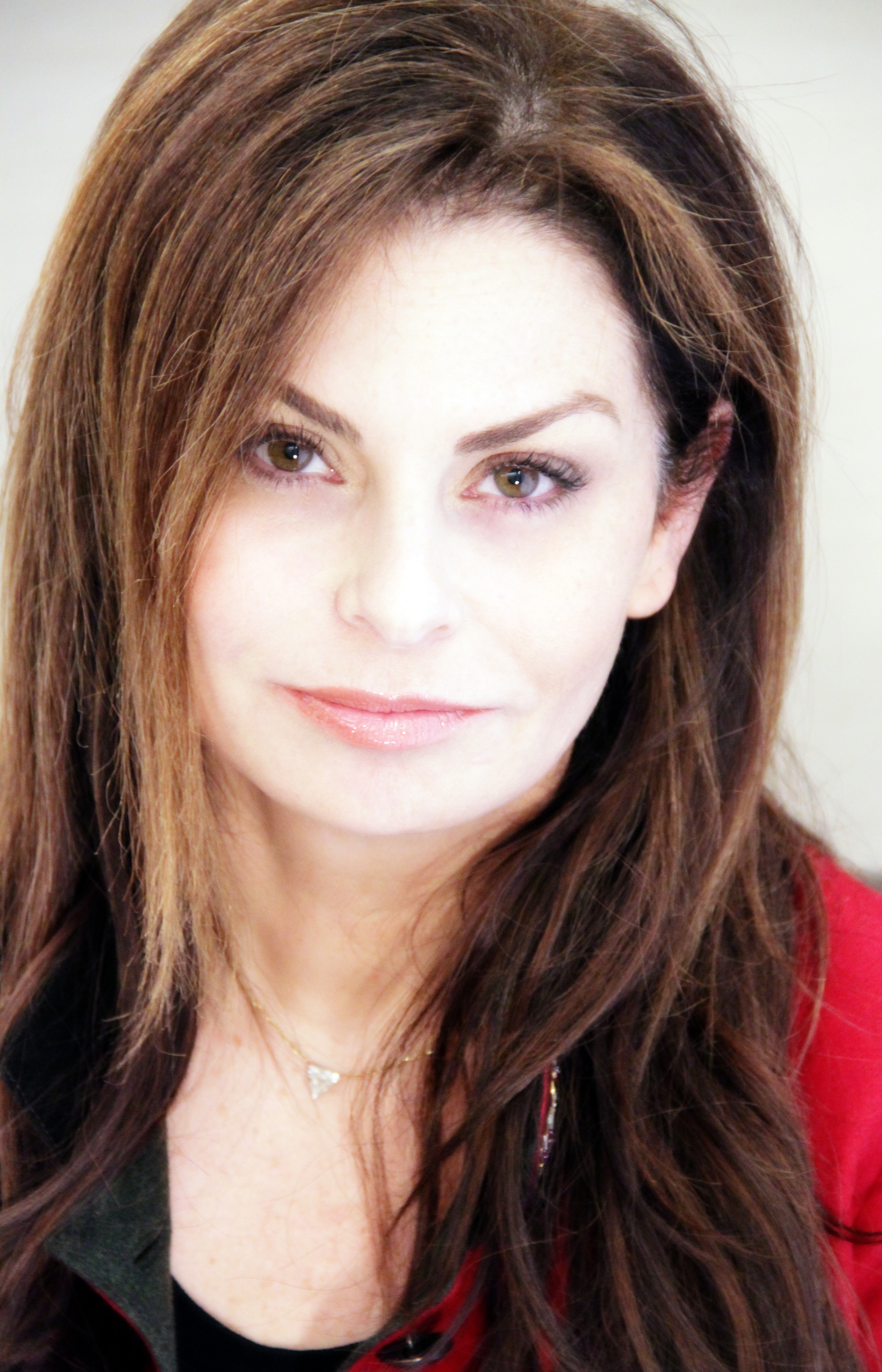
- Khashoggi in 2013
- Born: 19 February 1962 (age 64); Beirut, Lebanon
- Education: Millfield
- Years active: 1988–present
- Spouses: Danny Daggenhurst (m. 1992–1998) James Cox Chambers (m. 2004)
- Children: 2
- Parent(s): Adnan Khashoggi; Soraya Khashoggi
- Relatives: Dodi Fayed (cousin); Emad Khashoggi (cousin); Jamal Khashoggi (cousin); Samira Khashoggi (aunt); Soheir Khashoggi (aunt); Muhammad Khashoggi (grandfather)

Nabila Khashoggi (Arabic: نبيلة خاشقجي, born 19 February 1962) is a billionaire Arab-American businesswoman, author, and entrepreneur whose career has included entertainment, international business, beauty, and philanthropy. Khashoggi has been involved in business ventures in technology, real estate, tourism, and consumer products, and later founded the beauty and lifestyle brand NabilaK.

== Early life ==
Nabila Khashoggi was born in Beirut, Lebanon, the eldest child of the late Saudi Arabian arms dealer Adnan Khashoggi and his English former wife, Soraya Khashoggi (born Sandra Patricia Jarvis-Daly). She is the cousin of Dodi Fayed.

Her family moved to England in 1975 at the beginning of the Lebanese Civil War. Khashoggi was educated at Millfield. Her father named one of his yachts after her (1980).

== Career ==
Khashoggi studied acting with Joanne Baron in Los Angeles (a teacher of Jack Nicholson, Robert De Niro and Diane Keaton), and immersed herself in acting. Her most notable film roles include Eye of the Widow (1991), The Mystery of Edwin Drood (1993), Crack (1994), and Labyrinth (2003).

Khashoggi supplemented her acting income with business projects. In 1983, she formed Infolex Corp with business partner Bedros Bedrossian, an electrical engineer for the ITT Defense Communications Division. The company produced multilingual tourist information kiosks for travelers, purchased by hotel chains and airports.

In 1984, she began a real estate development venture with her brothers, which sold and developed properties in Spain, England, the United States, France, and South Korea. The siblings also ran a Kenyan tourist camp, and developed mobile hospital units for war torn areas.

In 2010, Khashoggi founded NabilaK, an online cosmetics, beauty, and home products company with a line of skin care and home ambiance products. The brand's message is to promote a healthier lifestyle through natural elements. The company supports The Children of Peace (ONLUS), an Italian charity for education and aid to children in less developed countries.

Khashoggi is the author of a series of children's adventure books, Spartan and the Green Egg.

== Personal life ==
In 1992, Khashoggi married British businessman Danny Daggenhurst, chairman of a palm oil company in Bangkok, and son of a former Greek ambassador to Czechoslovakia. They have a son, Spartan Daggenhurst. In 2004, Khashoggi married James Cox Chambers, an American billionaire heir, and in 2010 had a second son, Layth Chambers, with him. They live in New York.

== Children's books ==
- 2013, Spartan and the Green Egg - Book 1: A Trip to the Rainforest
- 2014, Spartan and the Green Egg - Book 2: The Reefs of Mindoro Island
- 2016, Spartan and the Green Egg - Book 3: Adventure at Wadi Allaqi
- 2018, Spartan and the Green Egg - Book 4: The Poachers of Tiger Mountain

== Filmography ==
Year	Title	Role
1988	Young Toscanini	Comparsa (uncredited)
1991	Eye of the Widow	Vanya
1993	The Mystery of Edwin Drood	Sapsea's Maid
1994	Crack: Una illusione senza ritorno	
2000	Beverly Hills, 90210	Clerk – Tainted Love
2001	Perfume	Kelley
2003	Labyrinth	Leila
