= Dodi Fayed =

Egyptian film producer (1955–1997)

- دودى الفايد
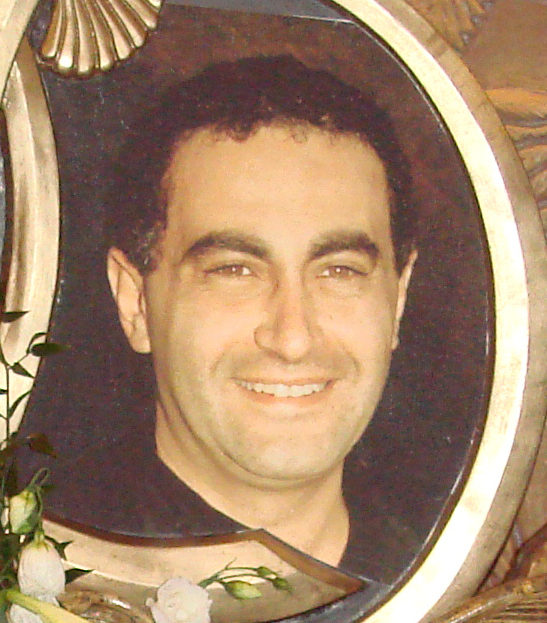
- Born: Emad El-Din Mohamed Abdel Mena'em Fayed عماد الدين محمد عبد المنعم الفايد; 15 April 1955 (Note: Most sources state that Fayed was born on 15 April 1955. This is the date that appears on his gravestone. However, since 2022, some sources have stated that he was born on 17 April.); Alexandria, Republic of Egypt
- Died: 31 August 1997 (aged 42); Paris, France
- Cause of death: Car crash
- Burial place: Barrow Green Court
- Occupation: Film producer
- Known for: Romantic relationship with Diana, Princess of Wales
- Spouse: Suzanne Gregard (m. 1986; div. 1987)
- Parents: Mohamed Al-Fayed; Samira Khashoggi
- Relatives: Omar Al-Fayed (half-brother); Jamal Khashoggi (cousin); Heini Wathén (stepmother)

Emad El-Din Mohamed Abdel Mena'em "Dodi" Al-Fayed (/ˈfaɪ.ɛd/ FY-ed; (Note: Arabic: عماد الدين محمد عبد المنعم "دودى" الفايد, romanized: ʿImād ad-Dīn Muḥammad ʿAbd al-Munʿim "Dūdī" al-Fāyid, Egyptian Arabic pronunciation: [ʕeˈmæːd ɪdˈdiːn mæˈħæmmæd ʕæbd elˈmenʕem ˈduːdi elˈfæːjed].) 15 April 1955 – 31 August 1997) was an Egyptian film producer and the eldest child of businessman Mohamed Al-Fayed. He was romantically involved with Diana, Princess of Wales, when they both died in a car crash in Paris on 31 August 1997.

== Biography ==
=== Early life and education ===
Fayed was born in Alexandria, Egypt, on 15 April 1955. He was the eldest child of Mohamed Al Fayed (1929–2023), who later became the owner of Harrods department store, Fulham Football Club, and the Hôtel Ritz Paris. Fayed's mother, Samira Khashoggi (1935–1986), was a Saudi author. She was a daughter of Muhammad Khashoggi and sister of Saudi billionaire arms dealer Adnan Khashoggi. Samira and her brother were first cousins of the late Washington Post Saudi journalist Jamal Khashoggi, who was assassinated in the Saudi Arabian consulate in Istanbul in 2018.

Fayed had four half siblings from his father's second marriage to Heini Wathén: Omar, Camilla, Karim, and Jasmine Fayed.

Fayed was a student at Collège Saint Marc in Alexandria before attending the Institut Le Rosey in Rolle, Switzerland. He also briefly attended the Royal Military Academy Sandhurst.

=== Career ===
After completing his education, Fayed worked as an attaché at the United Arab Emirates Embassy in London.

Through his family's production company, Allied Stars, Fayed was an executive producer for the films Chariots of Fire, Breaking Glass, F/X and its sequel F/X2, Hook, and The Scarlet Letter, and also as an executive creative consultant for F/X: The Series. He also worked for his father on marketing for Harrods.

== Personal life ==
In 1986, Fayed married model Suzanne Gregard. They divorced eight months later. According to her memoir, Babylon Confidential, Claudia Christian had an on-and-off romance with Fayed.

In 1997, Fayed reportedly became engaged to American model Kelly Fisher. With money from his father, he bought a house in Malibu, California, for Fisher and himself.

During the summer of 1997, actress Traci Lind accused Fayed of abuse, saying that he once threatened her with a 9mm Beretta and that he referred to her by the nickname “Bruisey.”

In July 1997, Fayed became romantically involved with Diana, Princess of Wales, after entertaining her on his yacht Cujo. Fisher learned of Fayed's relationship with Diana only after seeing paparazzi photos of the two embracing. Fisher announced that she was filing a breach of contract suit against him, saying he had "led her emotionally all the way up to the altar and abandoned her when they were almost there," and that he "threw her love away in a callous way with no regard for her whatsoever". Fayed denied that he was ever engaged to Fisher. Fisher dropped the lawsuit shortly after Fayed's death.

== Death ==
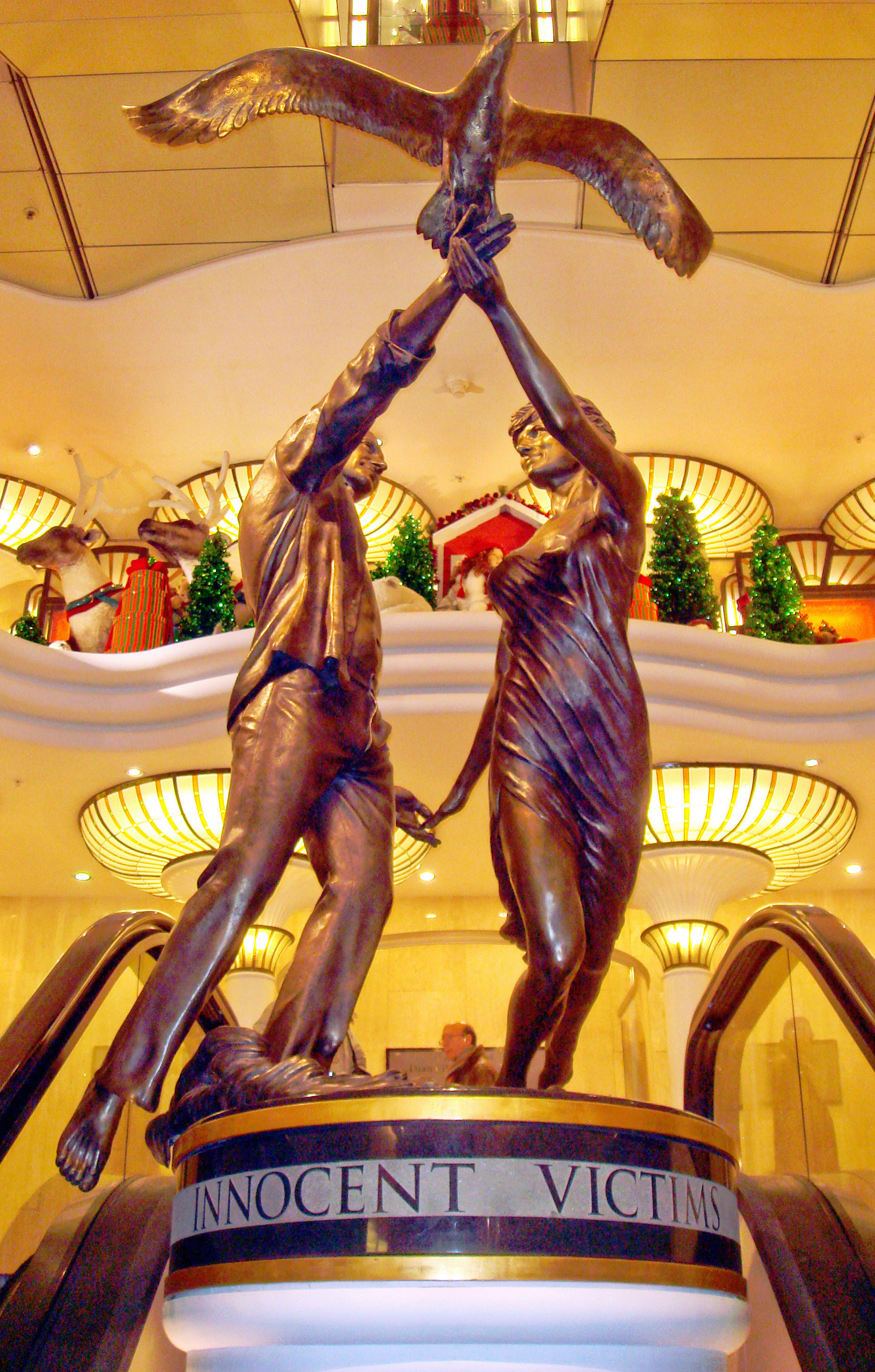
Innocent Victims, one of two memorials in Harrods

In the early hours of 31 August 1997, Diana and Fayed died in a car crash in the Pont de l'Alma underpass in Paris. They had stopped in Paris en route to London after spending nine days on holiday in the French and Italian Rivieras aboard his family's yacht, the Jonikal. Neither Fayed nor Diana was wearing a seat belt at the time of the crash. The only survivor of the crash was bodyguard Trevor Rees-Jones.

Investigations by French and British police concluded that the chauffeur, Henri Paul, was driving under the influence of alcohol and prescription drugs. They also reported that paparazzi chasing the couple were believed to have contributed to the accident.

Fayed's father, Mohamed Al-Fayed, said that the couple "were executed by MI6 agents". Fayed's former spokesman, Michael Cole, said that the couple became engaged before their deaths.

Fayed was originally buried in Brookwood Cemetery near Woking, Surrey, but was re-interred on the grounds of Barrow Green Court in October 1997, the family estate in Oxted, Surrey.

== Legacy ==
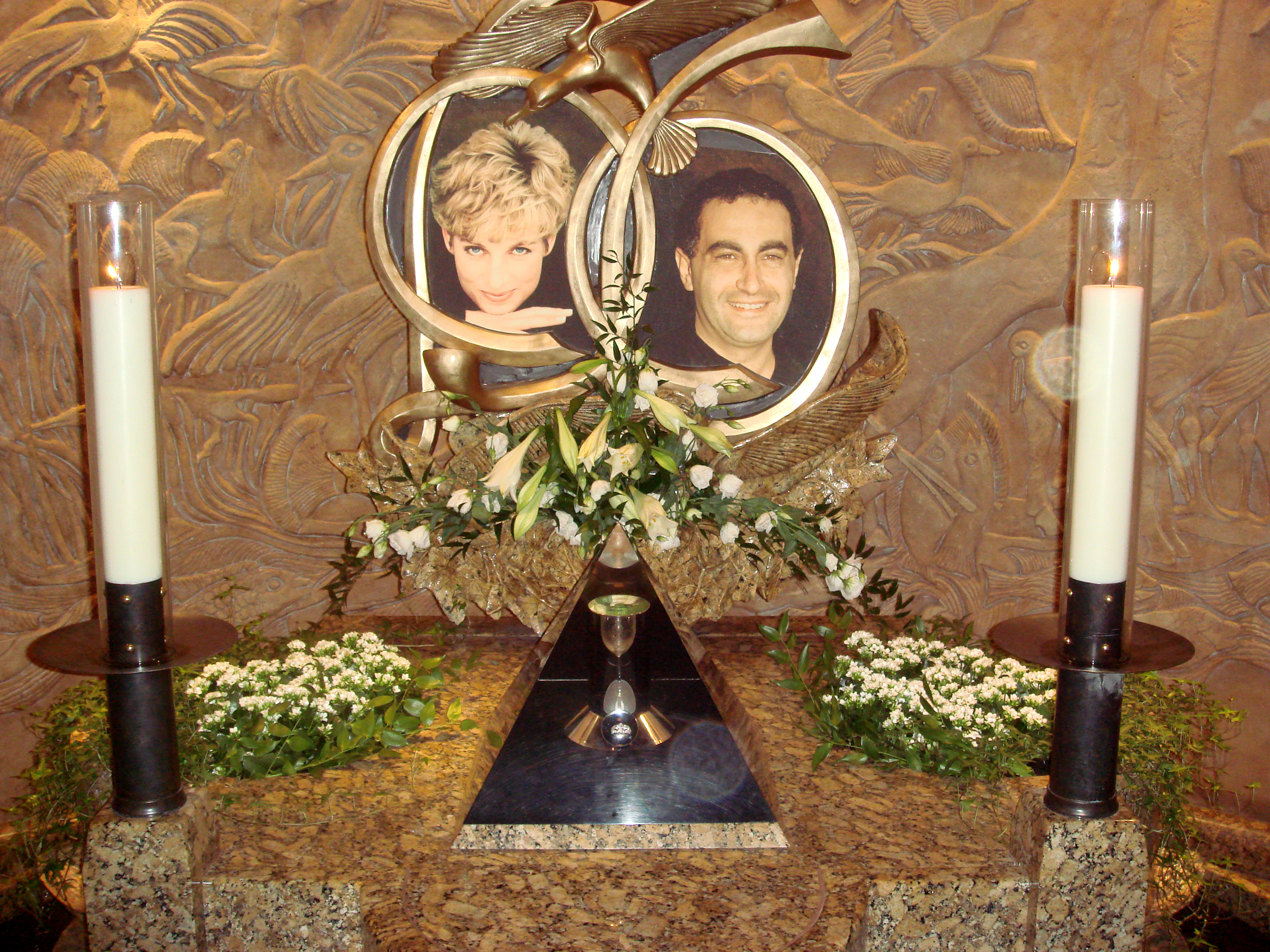
Memorial to Diana, Princess of Wales, and Dodi Fayed in Harrods

Fayed's father erected two memorials to his son and Diana at Harrods. The first, unveiled on 12 April 1998, consists of photos of them behind a pyramid-shaped display containing a wine glass smudged with lipstick from Diana's final dinner, and the ring Fayed had purchased for her the day before they died. The second, unveiled in 2005 and titled Innocent Victims, is a 3-metre (9.8-foot) high bronze statue of the two dancing on a beach, beneath the wings of an albatross, a symbol of freedom and eternity.

The memorials were designed by Bill Mitchell, a close friend of Fayed's father who had worked for the Fayed family for more than 40 years, including as a designer at Harrods. Fayed's father sold Harrods in 2010.

In January 2018, the manager of Harrods announced that the statue would be returned to the Al-Fayed family. He noted that Diana's sons William and Harry had commissioned a memorial to be installed at Kensington Palace, which the public could visit.

== Representation in other media ==
- In the 2013 film Diana, Fayed was portrayed by Cas Anvar.
- Episodes of seasons 5 and 6 of The Crown referred to him, and he was portrayed by Khalid Abdalla. In 2023, Abdalla received a Critics' Choice Television Award nomination for his performance.

== See also ==
- Operation Paget
