= Château du Verduron =

Castle in Marly-le-Roi, France

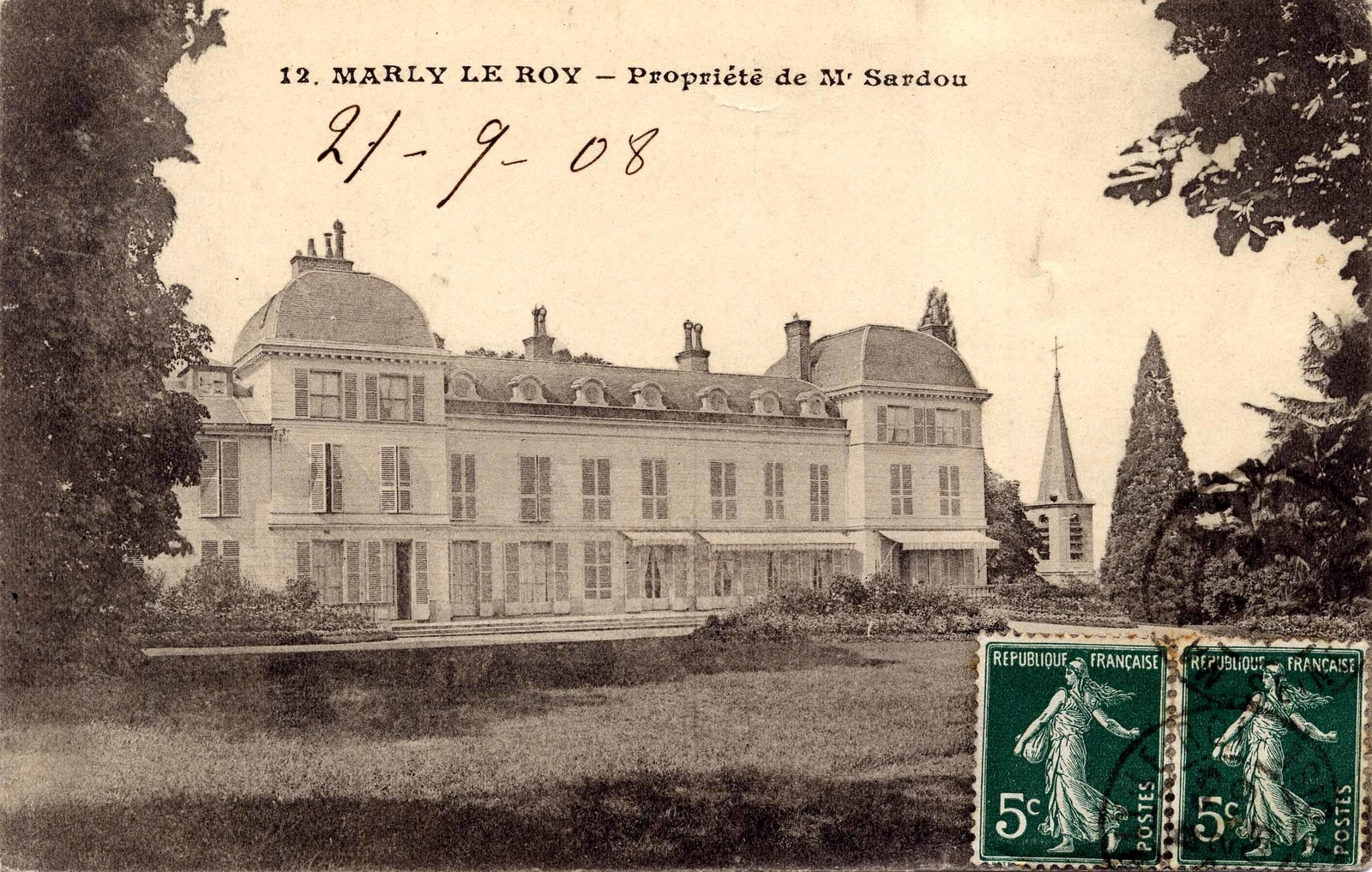

- Location within France

General information
- Location: Marly-le-Roi, France
- Coordinates: 48.866785°N 2.092060°E

The Château du Verduron (French pronunciation: [ʃato dy vɛʁdyʁɔ̃]) in the Parisian suburb of Marly-le-Roi, also known as the Château des Sphinx, owes its original fame to Louis Blouin, who held the prominent position of head valet in the court of Louis XIV of France from 1704 until 1715. Other distinguished owners of the property included Victorien Sardou, the French dramatist and one-time mayor of Marly-le-Roi.

The Château du Verduron is located on Place Victorien-Sardou in Marly-le-Roi, a commune in the department of Yvelines. Initially a simple one-story structure, it passed through a succession of owners following its original construction. In the early 2000s, it was purchased by SCI Le Verduron. This company commissioned COGEMAD to completely restore the building under the direction of Emad Khashoggi, who also managed the Château Louis XIV project in Louveciennes and the restoration of the Palais Rose in Le Vésinet.

== History ==
The history of this property is rich and complex. In the Middle Ages, the current site of the Château du Verduron was occupied by the lords of the Montmorency family.

The property passed through a succession of owners. Legend has obscured details of the site's history, in part due to some confusion between Jérôme Blouin and his brother Louis, the head valet of King Louis XIV. Some scholars believe that Louis XIV gave a portion of the former seigneurial domain to Louis Blouin, his head valet and the governor of Versailles and Marly, the two major royal castles of the period.

Others think that Louis Blouin acquired this property from Léon Bierry, the king's close advisor, who also held the important financial office of contrôleur général des rentes in the Hôtel de Ville.

The GRAHAL study of 2002, which was based on notarized documents found in the National Archives and the Departmental Archives of Versailles, refer to Blouin as the owner of the property only after 1726, later than Louis XIV’s death

Prior to that date, the property was occupied by the daughter of Léon Bierry and her husband, named Fresson, who was an attorney serving in the parliament of Versailles. The couple apparently made substantial additions to the existing property. In 1722, Fresson’s heirs sold the domain to César-Pierre Landais de Soisel, Louis XIV’s councilor and secretary. He in turn provided a lifetime lease on the property to Blouin in 1726.

Blouin left a strong mark on this monument’s history, whatever the precise details of his occupancy there. Described as “the king’s favorite” and “the little patron,” Blouin was considered to be a man of taste and culture. He loved to surround himself with “everything of distinction in the world of arts and letters.” A visitor to the property in Marly would have encountered prominent figures of the era, including Coysevox, Racine, Boileau, Girardon, and Mignard.

After Blouin died in 1729, the Comtesse de Feuquières, the daughter of the painter Mignard and Blouin's mistress, occupied the property until her own death in 1742.

The Comtesse de Vassé purchased the property in 1751 and lived there until she died in June 1768.

In 1769, the Comte de Jaucourt, the heir of the Comtesse de Vassé, sold the château to Augustin-Louis-Marie Rouillé, the chevalier and seigneur of Vaugien. That same year, Rouillé sold the usufruct of the property to Madame de Saint-Martin, whose husband obtained the right to exploit the ice ponds in the surrounding park. Subsequently, in 1781, Rouillé, ruined financially, also sold the bare ownership of the property to the Villemoriens. In 1784, they obtained full ownership by purchasing the rights of usufruct from the heir of the widowed Madame de Saint-Martin.

Monsieur de Villemorien, the Farmer General, and his wife, herself the daughter of a Farmer General, owned land separated from the Château du Verduron by a road through the Forest of Marly, a royal domain. They received permission to build a covered bridge over the road and thus enlarge their property. The residence was famed for the hostess's opulent festivities and the distinguished guests who attended them, including Saint-Aubin, who immortalized these gala celebrations in his engraving Le Bal paré.

Madame de Villemorien, who had been widowed and subsequently remarried, sold the Château du Verduron to Charles-Michel Trudaine de la Sablière in 1792. He was arrested during the French Revolution and perished on the scaffold shortly thereafter. Sixteen heirs contested the estate, particularly the property in Marly. Ultimately, Citizen Augustin d’Herblez and his wife prevailed by purchasing the shares of the other heirs.

The Château changed hands again in 1797, bought by Marie-Joseph Bourgouin. The unoccupied residence was imperiled until its purchase by the Parisian banker Pierre-Antoine Ravel in June 1802. An anecdote from this period tells of the hunting expedition of Napoleon Bonaparte, then the First Consul, who had the gates of the abandoned park opened so that his company could ride through the chateau's salon in pursuit of a stag.

Ravel's heir sold the property one last time in 1838 to Anne-Elie-Marie de Montmorency-Luxembourg, a distant descendant of the lords of the Montmorency family. She occupied the properties of her ancestors under the Restoration, but only very briefly. Fearing death on the scaffold, she was bullied out of her ownership rights by her politically liberal neighbors, who were closely allied to Marly’s mayor. Upon her death, the property was retroceded by her heir to his relatives, Madame and Monsieur Béthune-Sully. They used the château as a private hospital for Madame Béthune-Sully, who suffered from dementia.

In 1863, “a wanderer, mounted on a donkey that bore him through the woods at will, suddenly had his steed halt at the edge of a broad hollow covered with an abundance of tasty thistles. Our wanderer, enchanted by the spot’s cool air and solitude, urged his mount through the lofty trees that edged the far side of the ditch, eager to discover what their dense foliage would reveal.” This “wanderer” was none other than the dramatist Victorien Sardou. He was captivated by the place. Ardently longing to own it, he achieved his goal in August 1863. He altered the appearance of the property, filling it with his collections and the gifts bestowed on him by admirers.

A celebrated playwright, he surrounded himself with a circle of performers and artists who flattered him and enthusiastically attended the lavish receptions he hosted in his residence in Marly. Victorien Sardou also became involved in the daily life of the commune of Marly, but he met his match when he attempted to organize a genuine “counter-revolution.” Despite this setback, he kept his beloved Château des Sphinx. When he died in 1908, the usufruct of the property was granted to his wife, while the bare ownership went to his four children. They recovered the right of usufruct when their mother died and sold the property to Bertrand-Louis-Eugène Mir.

When Mir died in 1930, his nieces inherited. At the conclusion of the division of the estate, only the Marquise de Gonet received ownership of the property. In 1940, the marquise divided the property into two lots, which she gave to her two daughters. One of the parcels was designated the “Château des Sphinx” and the other the “Orangerie.” In 1970, the Château des Sphinx was sold to the insurance company AXA, which undertook the building's restoration in the 1970s. Other companies subsequently owned the residence until it was purchased by its current owner, SCI Le Verduron.

== Architecture ==
Details of the architectural history of the Château du Verduron are also somewhat unclear. The original core of the building dates from 1665, and is attributed to a certain Guillaume, a well-off Parisian. This original structure was initially modified when occupied by the Fressons.

According to C. Piton, a specialist in the history of Marly-le-Roi, the structure was unchanged between the time of its construction until the reign of Louis XIV, except for a few interior modifications during that king's era. However, most writers speak of a simple original core structure that was enlarged by subsequent owners.

In 1720, the residence was described as a “country home.” It consisted of a ground floor, a main floor, and an attic. The building was apparently enlarged during Blouin's tenancy, no doubt in accordance with the provisions of his life-time lease. Blouin was evidently authorized to transform the house “into a real little country chateau.” Again, there are conflicting architectural attributions. Some writers claim that Louis XIV commissioned Mansart himself to carry out the enhancements. Others believe that the alterations were based on plans by Lemoine. All agree that the dwelling boasted a “second pavilion in front.”

Further enlargement of the Château du Verduron is thought to have occurred under the ownership of the Comtesse de Vassé. She apparently added a new residential structure adjacent to the main building.

Madame de Villemorien subsequently altered the domain by connecting the Château du Verduron and another of her properties with a covered bridge above the road through the forest. She also restored the outbuildings. Finally, she linked the entry pavilion to the main part of the house, creating a space to serve as a library for her apparently extensive collection of books. But her single greatest transformation was the park, which had been a classically designed formal jardin à la française. In contrast, she designed a more naturalistic jardin à l’anglaise.

Left abandoned and on the brink of collapse by Marie-Joseph Bourgouin, the property was restored by Pierre-Antoine Ravel, who converted it into “a comfortable bourgeois residence.” He apparently added “picturesque” features to the park, including a thatched cottage and a grotto.

The property suffered additional indignities after the Restoration, when it was wrested from its owner by liberal party sympathizers. Anne-Elie-Marie de Montmorency was able to recover land by buying new parcels put up for sale by the municipality. However, the park and structures were profoundly altered in the process.

The next round of modifications was initiated by Victorien Sardou. He undertook some expansion and restoration work in the house, but devoted himself primarily to the park. He is to be credited for the new entrance with its monumental gate and the garden walk known as the “Allée des Sphinx” that gave the property its name of ”Château des Sphinx.” The impressive metal gate was given to Victorien Sardou by the Comédie Française; it is a copy of the one in front of the Orangerie in Versailles. The ten granite sphinxes that line the allée leading from the gate to the house were purchased by Sardou from the Sultan's Pavilion in the 1867 Exposition Universelle. He also built a new Orangerie at the southwestern edge of the property.

Mir once again modified the château's appearance by constructing a new entrance rotunda surmounted by a dome on the secondary façade. This rotunda and dome are prominent features in the current appearance of the Château du Verduron. SCI Le Verduron undertook a major campaign to restore the château, under the direction of the architect André Contenay.

During the 1970s, the château had been completely renovated by the insurance company AXA, which then occupied the premises. As was standard practice at the time, this work was carried out at the expense of authentic decorative elements that still existed at that time. Sculpted panels, cornices, and other moldings were eliminated in favor of more contemporary décor.

Between 1999 and 2001, COGEMAD, under the direction of Emad Khashoggi, was commissioned to carry out a complete restoration of the Château du Verduron. The building recovered its former appearance, reflecting the principles of seventeenth century architecture. That era's noble materials have been restored, and the building now boasts marbles, gilding, sculpted wood paneling, parquet floors in the manner of Versailles, and fine masonry work.

== Bibliography ==
- Marly-le-Roi, Camille Piton, 1894
- Marly-le-Roi et son histoire (697-1904), Camille Piton, 1904
- Victorien Sardou, collectionneur, in Le Temps, R. Aubry, April 10, 1909
- En marge de Marly, le Verduron, Le Figaro artistique, H. Soulange-Bodin, December 4, 1925
- La vie prodigieuse de Victorien Sardou (1831-1908), Georges Mouly, based on unpublished documents, 1931
- Les papiers de Victorien Sardou, Georges Mouly, 1934
- Château du Verduron ou de Verduron, in Bulletin Officiel Municipal de Marly-le-Roi, February. 1972, p. 10
- Marly, rues, demeures et personages, Christiane Corty-Neave, Marly-le-Roi, 1983
- Château du Verduron. De l’hôtel Blouin au Château du Verduron, quelques lignes d’histoire..., Notre groupe [Drouot], n°80, July 1984
- Les Trudaine à Marly sous la Révolution, M. de Gouberville, in Généalogie des Yvelines, n°7, March 1989
- Histoire de Marly des origines à 1914, P. Nickler, Présences et forces, 1996
- Louveciennes et Marly, Victorien Sardou, 1986
- Le Patrimoine des communes des Yvelines, Patrimoine des communes de France, 2000
- Enquête GRAHAL (Groupement Recherche Art Histoire Architecture et Littérature), study, 2002, under the direction of Michel Borjon
- Château Louis XIV, éd. Connaissance des Arts, May 2012
