= Louis d'Oger, Marquis de Cavoye =

French aristocrat

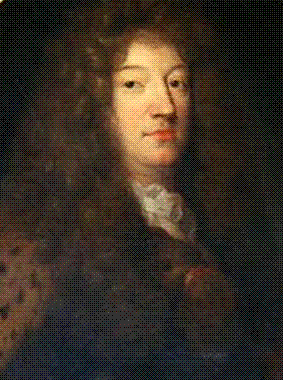
Louis d'Oger, Marquis de Cavoye

Louis d'Ogier, or d'Augier, Marquis de Cavoye (1640 – 1716) was a French aristocrat, childhood friend of King Louis XIV and Grand Marshall of the Royal Household at Versailles.

== Early life ==
Cavoye's father, François Ogier or Augier, Seigneur de Cavoye, was a French army officer killed in the service of the crown in 1641 at the Siege of Bapaume following the Battle of La Marfée; the young Cavoye was subsequently reared at the French court alongside the Dauphin, the future King Louis XIV, who was three years his junior — the two became close lifelong friends.

== Career ==
Despite his friendship with the King, in 1668, Cavoye was imprisoned in the Conciergerie for two years following a duel with Marquis de Courcelles; the two had quarrelled over rumours spread by Hortense Mancini that Cavoye was having an affair with Courcelles's wife, who was also reputed to be the lesbian lover of Mancini. However, as a Favourite of the king, his imprisonment was far from onerous, and he enjoyed many privileges. The dual was fought, in the early morning, in Paris's Le Marais; both dualists were uninjured, but had contravened a strict Royal ban on duelling. Both men served the full two-year sentence.

In 1677, the scandal behind him, d'Oger was made Grand Marshall of the Royal Household (Maréchal des logis du roi). D'Oger was appointed Aide de Camp to the king in 1684.

Unusually, for a King's Favourite, the Marquis de Cavoye was held in high esteem, among those who lauded him were Joseph de Maistre, who said that D'Oger had "the highest degree of sentiment of dignity" and "honour"; and D'Artangnan, who claimed that D'Oger was a rare man at court because he never told a lie. Others noted his remarkable similarity in looks to the King.

== Personal life ==
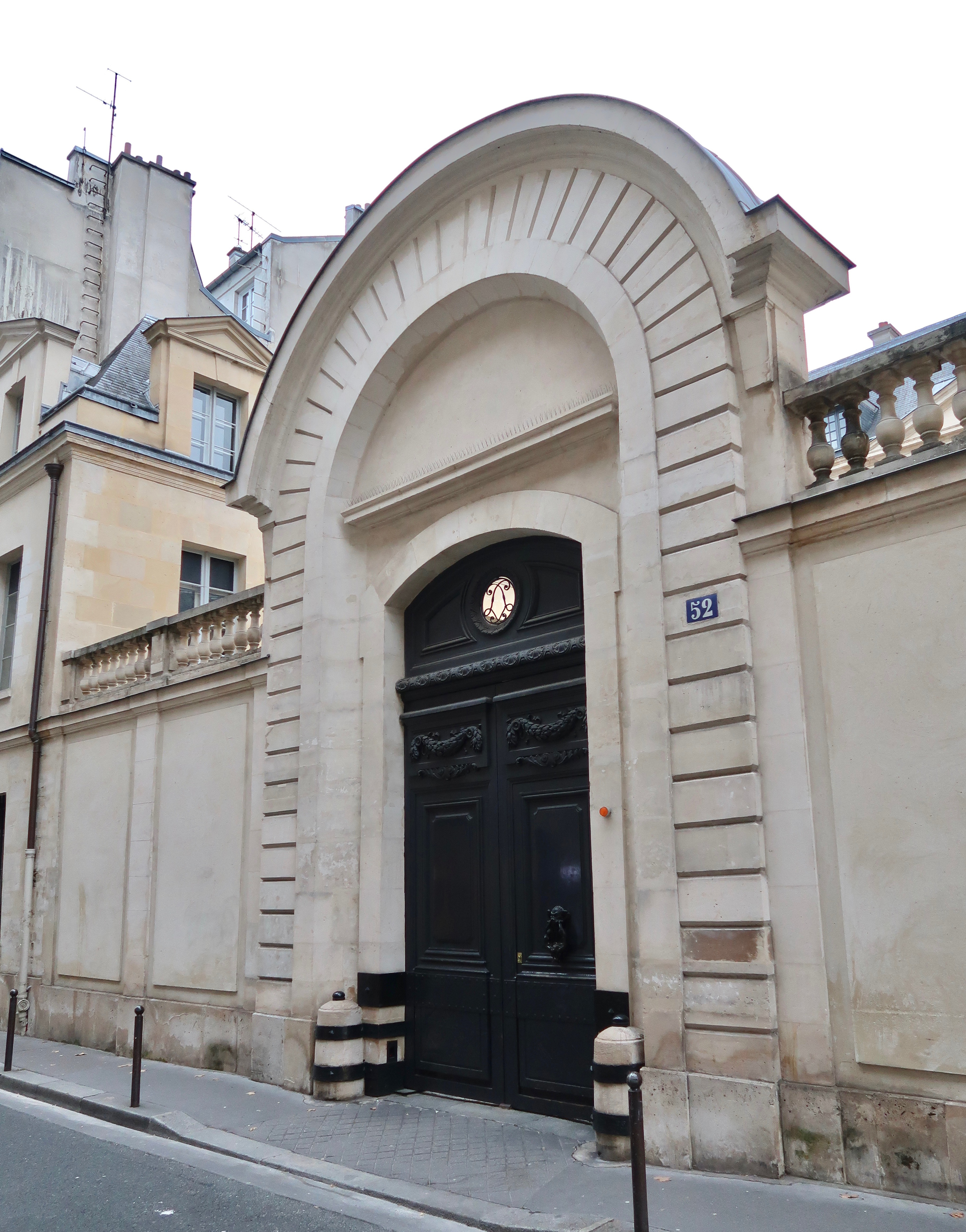
The Hôtel de Cavoye, 52 rue des Saints-Pères, Paris

In 1677, he also married Louise Philippe de Coëtlogon (1641–1729) who was a Maid of Honour to Louis XIV's wife, Queen Maria Theresa. It has been claimed that Louise was popular with the Queen because she was not a conventional beauty and unlikely to be admired by the King,

Cavoye died at his Paris house in 1716.

=== Residences ===
In Paris, the Marquis' town house was the Hôtel de Cavoye at 52 Rue des Saints-Pères, now in the 7th Arrondissement. He purchased the mansion, in July 1679, from the Marquise de Courcelles over whom he had fought his infamous dual. In 1686, Cavoye demolished the mansion and built a grand new house on the site, designed by one of the most eminent architects of the day, Daniel Gittard. Today, the mansion remains a private house, and one of the few remaining unchanged palaces of the ancien régime in Paris. As Grand Marshall of the Royal Household, to be near Versailles and the royal court, he bought in 1696, Chateau Voisins in Louveciennes.
