= The Watering Trough at Marly with Hoarfrost =

1876 painting by Alfred Sisley

The Watering Pond at Marly with Hoarfrost
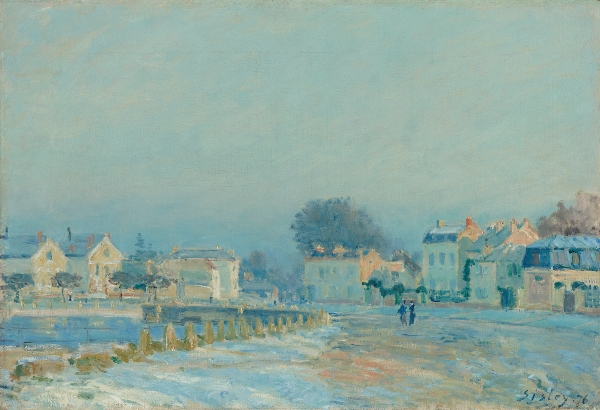
- Artist: Alfred Sisley
- Year: 1876
- Medium: Oil on canvas
- Dimensions: 37.78 cm × 54.93 cm (14.87 in × 21.63 in)
- Location: Virginia Museum of Fine Arts, Richmond, Virginia

The Watering Trough at Marly with Hoarfrost is an 1876 painting by Alfred Sisley. It was owned by François Depeaux, a Sisley collector, and passed through other collections before ending up in that of Paul Mellon. It is now in the Virginia Museum of Fine Arts in Richmond, United States. It was painted at Marly-le-Roi and is part of his Marly series. Sisley's works showing the watering trough and The Flood at Port-Marly are two series of Impressionist masterworks comparable to Claude Monet's Gare Lazare series, Renoir's The Swing and Bal du moulin de la Galette series, Berthe Morisot's Champs de blé series and Camille Pissarro's Vues de Pontoise and Toits rouges series. Sisley did not much change his point of view between each painting, but he dramatically changed the background, proving his ability to vary views of a limited section of countryside.

The watering trough became a favourite subject of Sisley's during his time at Marly, breaking with subjects of the 18th- and early-19th-century Paris Salons. Like Pissarro, Monet and Renoir, he showed more interest in its current domestic and utilitarian use than in its status as a remnant of the Ancien Régime or its past life as an ornamental lake.

== Context ==
Sisley moved into 2 avenue de l'Abreuvoir at Marly in winter 1874–1875 and remained there until 1877, exploring the village and its surroundings. A window of his house overlooked the abreuvoir and he made several studies of it and also of the town's park. Marly's abreuvoir was then the last remnant of the cascades, basins and fountains of the gardens of Louis XIV's château de Marly, designed by André Le Nôtre and destroyed under the French First Empire. The waters of the Seine was pumped and channeled via the Aqueduc de Louveciennes and the Machine de Marly, two buildings which appeared in several of Sisley's works. Whilst he was living at Marly-le-Roi, the basin had been converted into an abreuvoir for watering horses and washing linen for the villages of Louveciennes and Marley, but it was still the only part of the château's estate to be classified as a Monument historique, a title it gained in 1862. The Chevaux de Marly statues which had adorned the basin had already been moved to the Place de la Concorde in Paris.

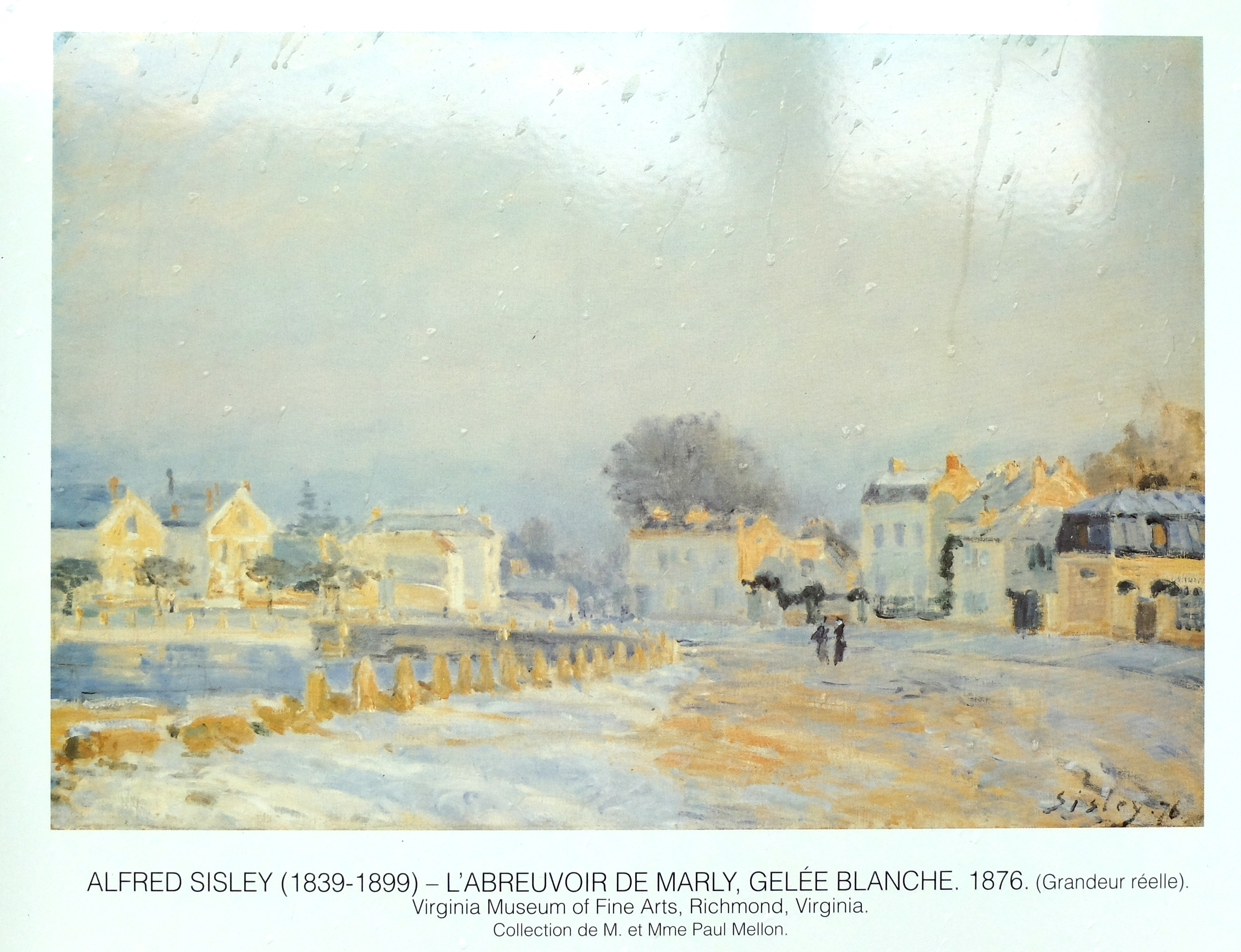
Reproduction of the work in the domaine national de Marly-le-Roi above the Marly watering trough

Since the 1990s, a full-size reproduction of the work has been on show near the site on which it was painted as part of the Pays des Impressionnistes project.

The work shows a winter scene, including the ramp allowing horses to enter the water in summer, although that ramp features more markedly in Horse Bath in Port-Marly (D. 172). Lisa Portnoy Stein argues that Sisley slightly modifies their position and decreases the size of the basin, the better to show the village and its houses at the composition's centre. The work's horizontal composition, compared to the other works in the group, accentuates this impression.

== Provenance ==
- François Depeaux, Rouen
- Sold by the Galerie Georges Petit, Paris, 31 May-1 June 1906, bought by Paul Durand-Ruel for 8 000 francs
- Sold on 17 November 1913 to Paul Cassirer, Berlin
- Dr Curt Hirschland, Essen
- Wildenstein, New York
- Mrs Hirschland, New York
- Mr and Mrs Paul Mellon
- Mr and Mrs Paul Mellon Collection, Virginia Museum of Fine Arts, Richmond

== See also ==
- List of paintings by Alfred Sisley
