= Château Louis XIV =

21st-century French château

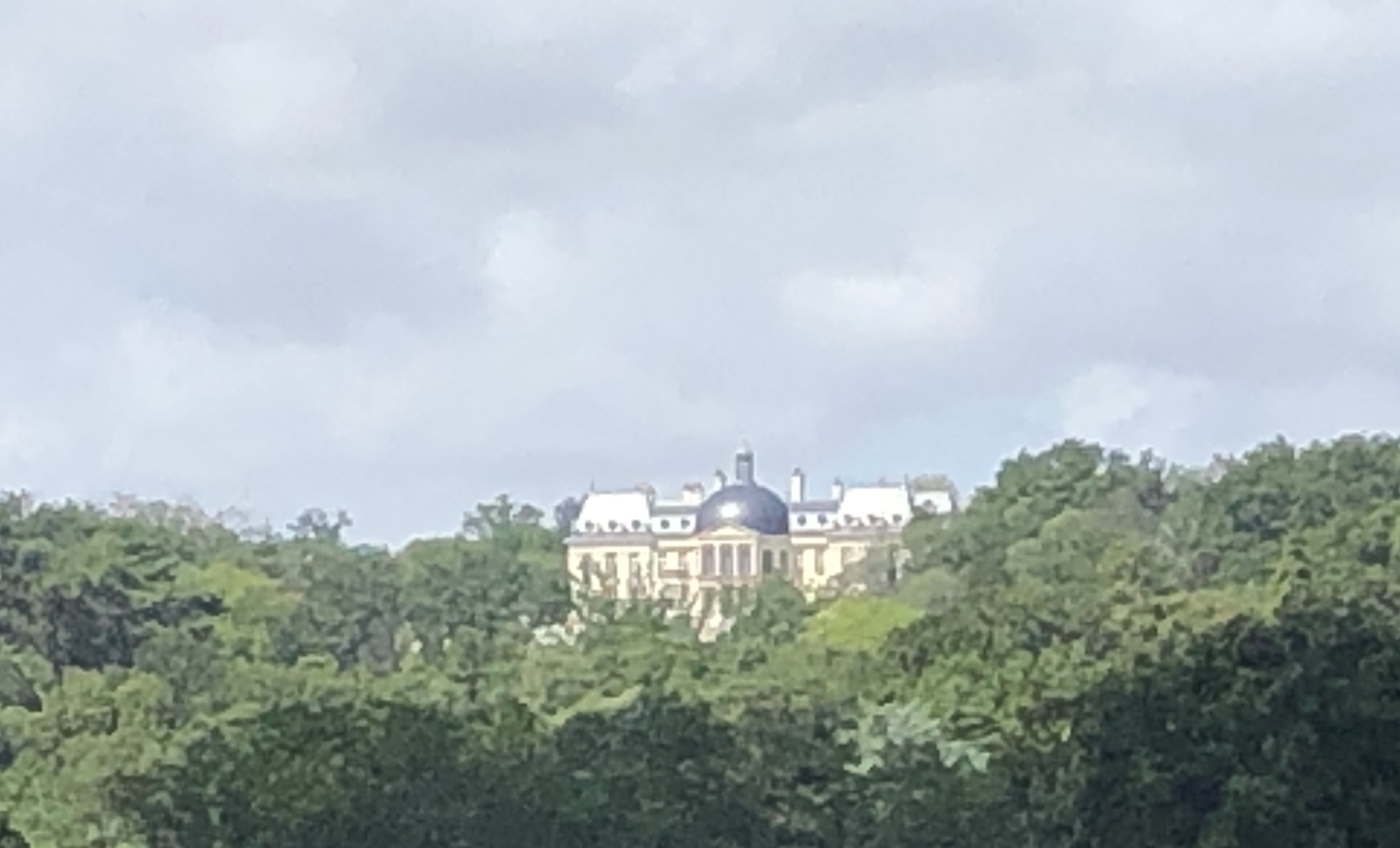
- View toward the château in 2019

- Location within France

General information
- Architectural style: Châteauesque
- Location: Louveciennes, France
- Coordinates: 48.8499°N 2.1204°E
- Construction started: 2008
- Completed: 2011
- Owner: Mohammad bin Salman

Château Louis XIV is a château in France that was constructed between 2008 and 2011. It is located in the commune of Louveciennes in the Yvelines department of the Île-de-France region.

The chateau was built by the property developer Emad Khashoggi's property development company COGEMAD using traditional craftsmanship techniques and materials. Located between Versailles and Marly-le-Roi on a 23-hectare (57-acre) walled site, the property is surrounded by moats and has a constructed surface area of 7,000 m^{2} (75,000 ft^{2}), 5,000 m^{2} (54,000 ft^{2}) of which are living space. The property pays various tributes to Louis XIV, France's Sun King and stands on land which once formed part of the Versailles estate.

Khashoggi had previously restored the Palais Rose in Le Vésinet and the Château du Verduron in Marly-le-Roi. The Château Louis XIV was built on the site of the former Château du Camp in Louveciennes, with the aim of building a modern house, with hi-tech controls incorporated within a 17th-century aspect, layout, and materials. The château incorporates elements inspired by the château Vaux-le-Vicomte and the Palace of Versailles.

In 2015, the chateau was purchased by Saudi Crown Prince Mohammad bin Salman for US$301 million, a world record for a residential property.

== History ==
In the late 17th century, the property where the current Château Louis XIV was built consisted of several plots of land, chestnut groves and woodland. In the early 18th century, the royal regiment was in charge of participating in a major excavation project in Marly-le-Roi. They thus decided to set up camp in an existing clearing on these very plots of land.

During this period, Louis XIV decided to build a palace in Marly-le-Roi nestled in a lush green setting; a place where he would regularly go to find the peace and quiet that he lacked in Versailles.

Later, the Swiss Guards, assigned to ensure the security of the Château de Marly, set up their camp on the property. Also known as the "Royal Regiment Camp" or the "Marly Camp," the camp disappeared in the mid 18th century, and the Château de Marly suffered in the French Revolution.

In 1797, during a settlement, the camp and land that were part of the property were sold to Françoise-Suzanne Guyhon Monthaut who, in turn, sold them to the Vicomte Charles-Gilbert Morel de Vindé and his wife in 1805. The Vicomte Charles-Louis Terray de Morel-Vindé, counselor at the royal court in Paris, inherited the property following the death of his grandfather in 1842, and sold it in 1848 to Jean-Pierre Blondi and Adélaïde Halguin, who had the first house and outbuildings built on the property.

The camp property became a large farm. Here, a cavalry regiment and several military companies would sometimes set up camp in what was then called "The camp farm" until 1863, when Dr Duborgia, mayor of Bougival, purchased and expanded the property.

In 1888, Charles-Emile Clerc, the new owner following the death of Duborgia, undertook the demolition of the initial buildings which, over the years, had only undergone a few scarcely noticeable changes. Having acquired several plots of land, Charles-Emile Clerc was able to expand the property, which he transformed into a residential domain with a large house surrounded by extensive wooded grounds.

The property remained in the family for over a century. During this time, it underwent a few modifications such as the addition of a stable, a caretaker's house and a number of paths, before eventually being sold to a French couple in 1991. This would then give way to a succession of owners, until the site's purchase and rebuilding by Khashoggi.

=== COGEMAD ===
The Saudi-born French property developer Emad Khashoggi demolished the building and constructed a new house, built with respect to 17th-century craft traditions. Khashoggi employed craftsmen with traditional skills. He explained that he wanted to "give rise to a 'new structure,' for which one is able to create sustainable projects that will make their mark in the future as well as in the heritage of a region, a country." For the construction of the Château Louis XIV his company, Cogemad, employed an average of 120 workers every day, and included artisans such as: sculptors, mosaic artisans, painters, gilders, iron craftsmen, cabinetmakers, marble masons, landscapers, fibrous plasterers, clockmakers, bronze casting artisans, roofers, carpenters and coppersmiths. The property includes an underwater room built into the moats – the only one of its kind in Europe. The ceiling of the drawing room has a trompe-l'œil painting inspired by a fresco created by Charles Le Brun for the Château de Vaux-le-Vicomte, which took master painters several months to create. This, in addition to the fountain in the gardens, is one of the centerpieces of the château.

== The trades and the artisans ==
Numerous companies certified as Living Heritage Artisans and Companies took part in this project, which enabled them to train new craftsmen. The construction project brought together several age-old trades, which produced the following key works:

=== Stonemasonry ===
860 m^{3} (30,000 ft^{3}) of massive natural stone divided as follows:

- 80 m^{3} (2,800 ft^{3}) of Lanvignes limestone
- 175 m^{3} (6,200 ft^{3}) of fine Saint-Maximin limestone
- 605 m^{3} (21,400 ft^{3}) of fine Saint-Maximin limestone

They were used to make balusters, sculpted tables, fire pots and capitals for sculpted pilasters.

On display in the château's Garden à la française is a stone-sculpted reproduction of the Chariot of Apollo from the fountain in Versailles. The smaller-scale copy of this sculpted group, designed for the king's gardens by the artist Jean-Baptiste Tuby, retained the proportions and details of the original. It was then gilded in gold-leaf.

=== Marble ===
The marble was crafted in various styles: delicate marquetry for the floors, mosaics for the garden level, book matched in the bathrooms, sculpted for the monumental statue of Louis XIV and molded for the Grand Siècle-style fireplaces.

List of marbles used and their place of origin:

- Black Saint-Laurent: Hérault – France
- Yellow Sienna: Tuscany – Italy
- Antique Green: Aosta Valley – Italy
- Cherry Red: Belgium
- Collemandina Marble: Tuscany – Italy
- Salome Marble: Turkey
- Red Levante Marble: Liguria – Italy
- Macauba Quarzite: Brazil
- Pink Alpinina : Portugal
- Moonstone: Brazil
- Pink onyx: Iran
- Rouge de France: Hérault – France
- Calacatta Topazio : Tuscany – Italy
- Bamboo Green: Brazil

=== Cabinetmaking and joinery ===
Many 17th-century style decorations sculpted in wood embellish the interior. One of the centerpieces is found on the monumental entrance door sculpted entirely by hand in oak in high relief, and projects out by 17 cm (6.7 in). It depicts the Sun God on horse-back as a Roman Emperor crowned by Victory. This work was inspired by a model from the War Room at the Château de Versailles.

=== Clock-making ===
For the façade of the château, Emad Khashoggi commissioned clock-makers to create a genuine monumental bronze and enamel clock identical to the one on the façade of the Château de Versailles.

=== Painting and decor ===
Several ceilings in the reception halls and master suites depict themes dear to Louis XIV, and which appear at Versailles. The painted ceiling of the cupola in the main drawing room was influenced by a never-executed Allégoire de l’Aurore conceived by Charles Le Brun for the Château de Vaux-le-Vicomte.

=== Bronze casting ===
Works include the creation of 17th-century style lamps and decorative hardware inspired by numerous archives from the History of France, notably from the 17th century under the reign of Louis XIV.

=== Iron-working ===
Works include numerous handmade curved banisters and balustrades reproduced from 17th-century spirals and motifs. These assemblages are always created using tenons, mortises or pegs, without the slightest trace of welding, according to the finest French tradition.

=== Framework ===
A traditional frame was constructed for the dome, which was assembled the old-fashioned way using a system of tenons and mortises.

=== Roofing ===
In keeping with age-old techniques, the roofers hand-crafted the slate roof from Angers. The roof also boasts fire pots sculpted in stone and gilded metal spikes on the roof's ridge beam.

=== Gardens ===
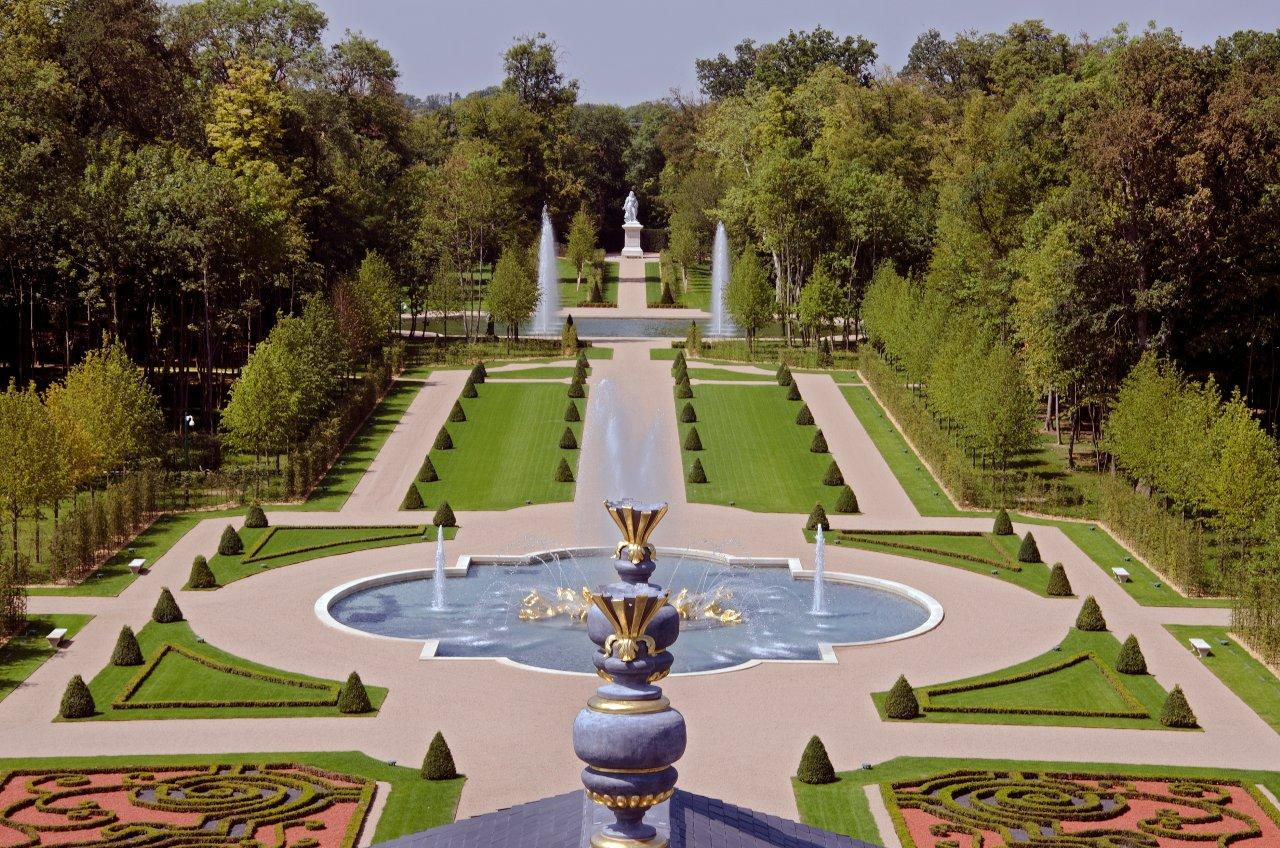
The formal gardens of the château

The Château Louis XIV, nestled in a lush green setting and its parks and gardens are no exception. In line with André Le Nôtre's theories for the Château de Versailles and the Château de Vaux-le-Vicomte, the grounds pay tribute to the French-style gardens. It boasts flower beds and embroidered box hedges, plays on perspective, topiary yew trees clipped into small pyramids, a tree-lined labyrinth, a small farmhouse with goats, a vegetable garden, stables and even an English-style garden on the lower level, all in keeping with the natural outlines of the property where the château is located.
