= Cimetière de Louveciennes =

Cemetery in France

Coordinates: 48.8642°N 2.1100°E

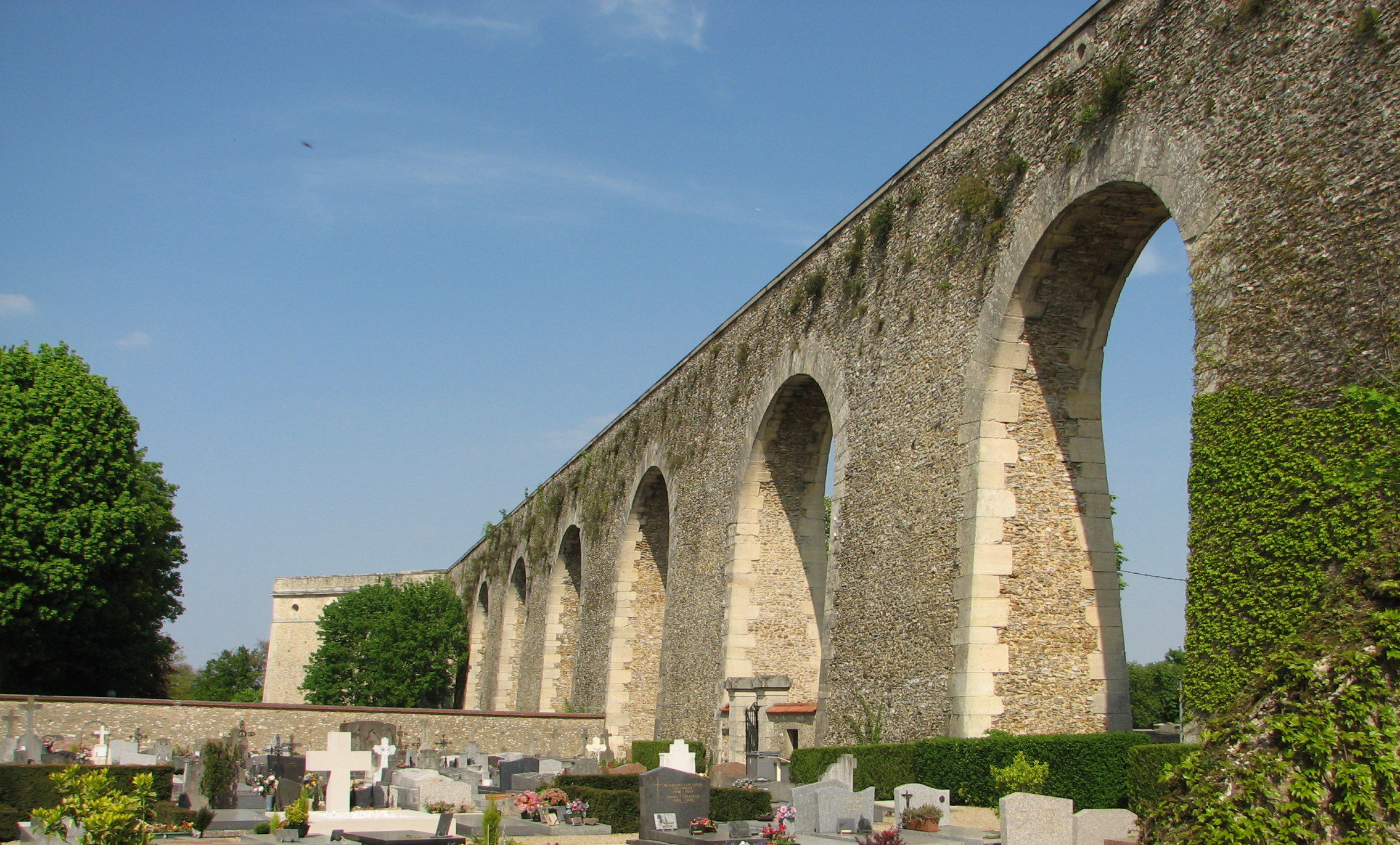
Cimetière des Arches.

The Cimetière de Louveciennes (Louveciennes Cemetery), also Cimetière des Arches, is made up of a standard laid out cemetery and a landscaped cemetery located on the Allée des Arches in the village of Louveciennes in the Yvelines département of France. The village is at the western suburbs of Paris and is between Versailles and Saint-Germain-en-Laye, and adjacent to Marly-le-Roi.

Both of the Louveciennes cemeteries are bordered by a 650-metre portion of the Louveciennes Aqueduct originally built in 1684 by Jules Hardouin Mansart to supply the Palace of Versailles with water.

== Notable interments ==
- Alain Bernardin (1916–1994), owner of the Crazy Horse night club
- Julien Cain (1887–1974), director of the National Library of France 1930–1964
- Emmanuel Frémiet (1824–1910), sculptor
- Joseph Joffre (1852–1931), Commander-in-Chief of the French Army 1914–1916 during World War I (burial plot on his estate)
- Charles Munch (1891–1968), conductor
- Louise Élisabeth Vigée Le Brun (1755–1842), portrait painter
