= Château de Voisins (Louveciennes) =

French palace

Coordinates: 48.8662°N 48.8662°E

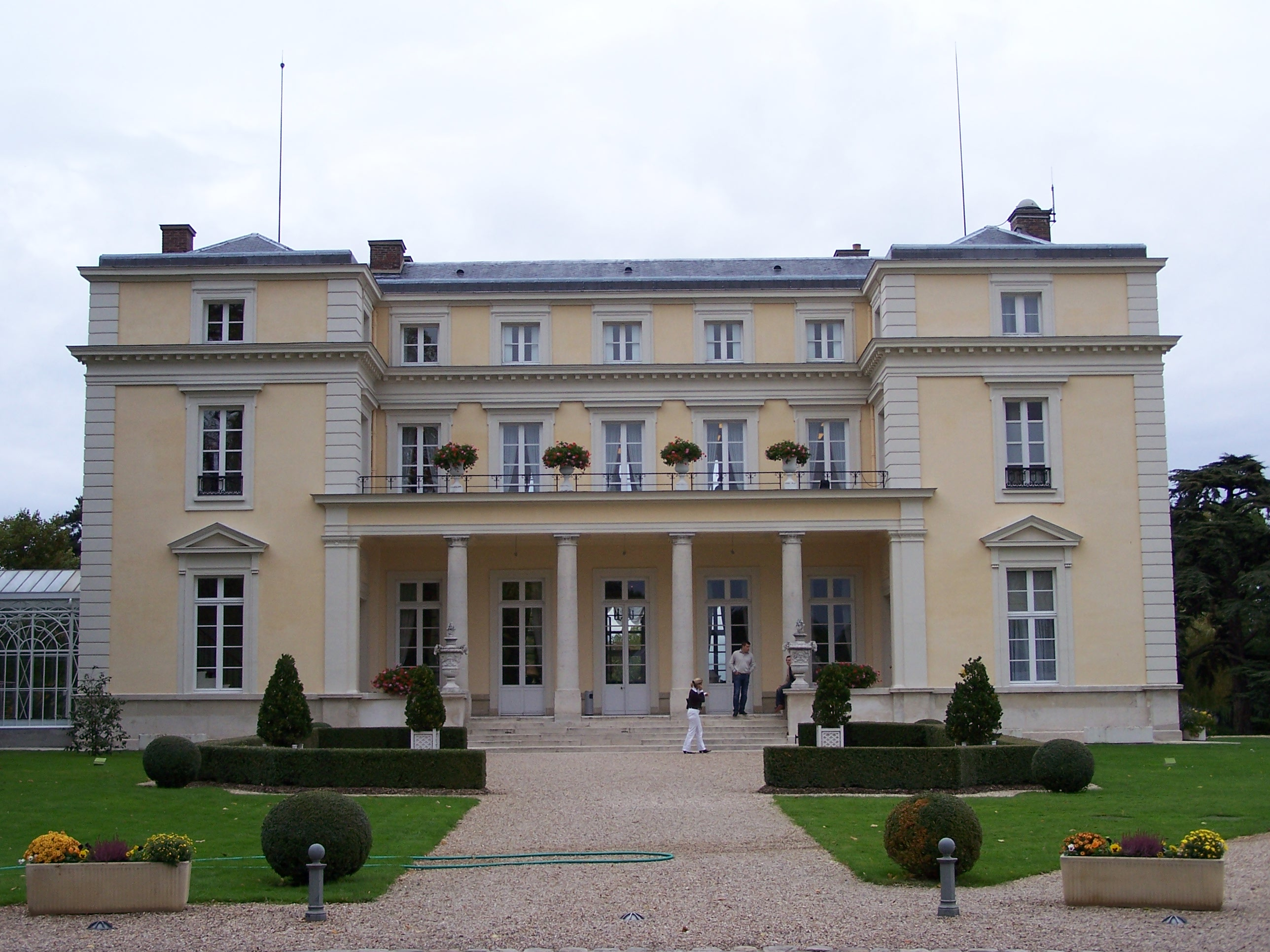
Chateau de Voisins

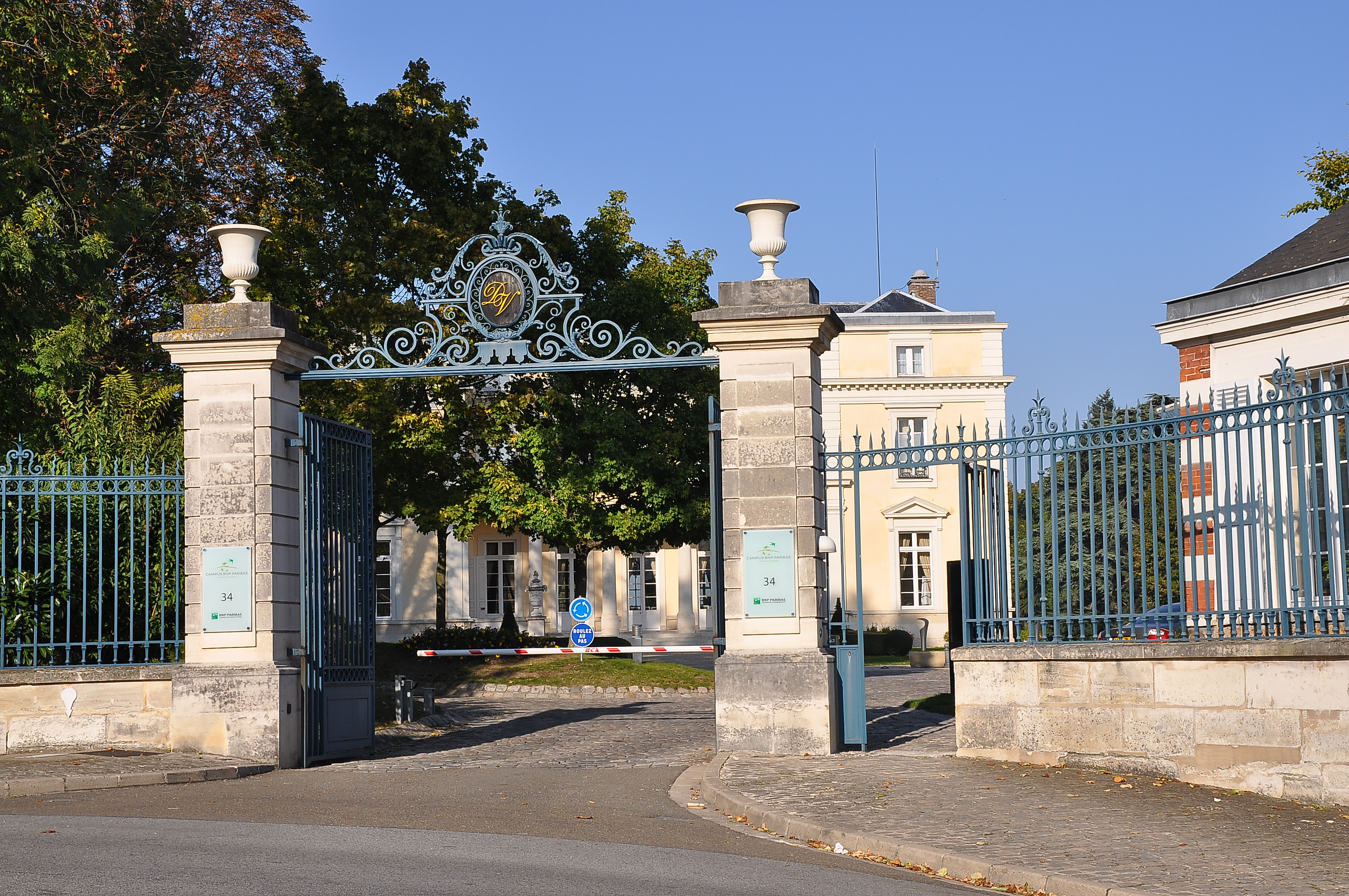
The 19th-century lodge and entrance to the grounds commissioned by Charles Tavernier

The Château de Voisins is a neoclassical mansion located in Louveciennes, in the department of Yvelines, France. It is 8 kilometres north of Versailles, and 20 kilometres east from the centre of Paris.

The first château on the site was built between 1650 and 1675. In 1696, probably due to its proximity to Versailles, the château was bought by the Marquis de Cavoye, Grand Marshall of the household of Louis XIV. During the late 18th century, the château became the property of Louise Élisabeth de Bourbon-Condé, Princess de Conti (1693–1775). A granddaughter of Louis XIV and Madame de Montespan, the princess had the château rebuilt to designs of Claude-Nicolas Ledoux. The princess is most notable as the woman who officially presented Madame de Pompadour to the court of King Louis XV at Versailles, in return for settlement of her debts by the king.

Circa 1820, a new owner, the Comte de Turtot Hocquart, finding the château old fashioned, had it remodelled. In 1857, the estate was sold again, and purchased by Charles Tavernier, who built the lodge and redesigned and landscaped the grounds. In 1874, Tavernier gave the chateau to the banker Julius Beer, who gave it to his son William. William's wife Elena created a notable literary salon there. It was at the chateau that Leconte de Lisle wrote his work La Rose de Louveciennes. The poet died while staying at the chateau's classical garden pavilion in 1894.

The mansion is designed on an "H" plan, with the two extending wings joined by an open loggia on the southern entrance facade, and on the northern garden facade by an orangery. On the eastern side is low, unobtrusive wing containing the kitchens and domestic offices. The main block is of three floors, with five principal rooms on the ground floor. The low hipped roof is concealed by a closed parapet.

Following William's death in 1913, his widow retained use of the garden pavilion, but the estate passed to a relative, the banker and collector Robert de Rothschild (1880–1946). On his death, the estate was sold. France's Banque nationale pour le commerce et l'industrie (BNCI) purchased the property in 1946. As of 2022, it remains the property of BNCI's successor BNP Paribas, which operates it as an executive training center.

The mansion has been registered as a monument historique since 10 February 1948.10 février 1948
