= Palais Rose, Vésinet =

Building in Vésinet, France

Palais Rose
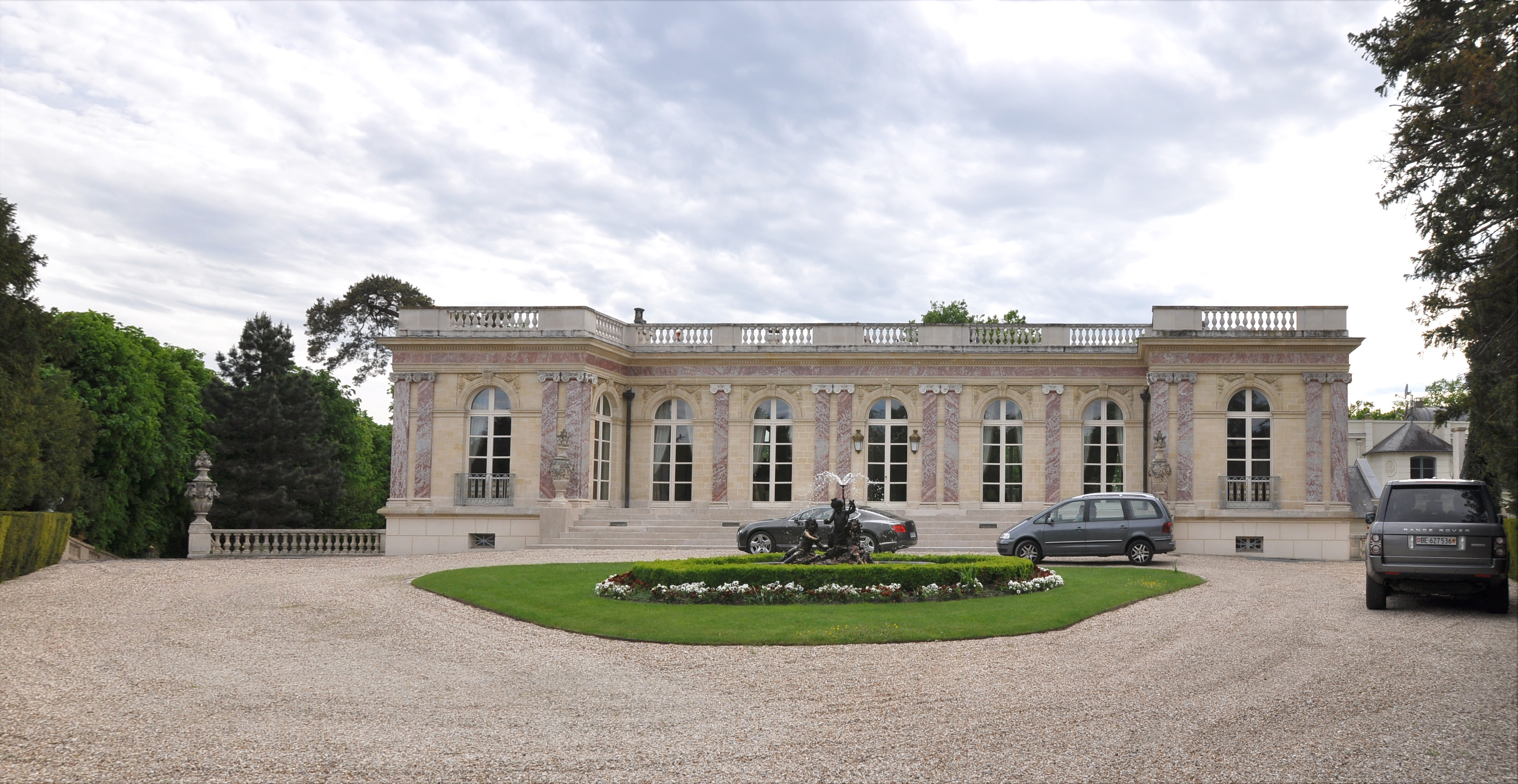

- Location within France

General information
- Type: Hôtel particulier
- Architectural style: Classical
- Location: Le Vésinet, France
- Coordinates: 48.89722°N 2.1267°E
- Completed: 1899; 127 years ago

The Palais Rose (French pronunciation: [palɛ ʁoz]; lit. 'Pink Palace'), located at 14 Allée des Fêtes at the corner of 12 Rue Diderot in Le Vésinet in the department of Yvelines, was built in 1899, inspired by the Grand Trianon in Versailles. In 1986 it was added to the official listing of historical monuments by the Ministry of Culture.

The Palais Rose in Le Vésinet should not be confused with the "other" Palais Rose, which once stood on Avenue Foch and was razed in the early 1970s. The two buildings did however share a number of features. Both structures were designed around 1900 in the "Grand Trianon" style.

The Palais Rose in Le Vésinet was built for the shipowner Arthur Schweitzer. Some ten subsequent owners, including notables such as Comte Robert de Montesquiou and the Marquise Luisa Casati, contributed to the fame of this dwelling, organizing lavish receptions there. Various owners succeeded one another until the property was purchased by an individual. It was then comprehensively restored in the 2000s under the direction of Emad Khashoggi, head of COGEMAD, who was also responsible for the Château Louis XIV project in the forest of Louveciennes.

== History ==
Following the sale of the Forest of Vésinet to the Société Pallu et Cie, known as the “Société des Terrains et des Eaux du Vésinet,” by the Ministre d’Etat de la Maison de l’Empereur, the shipowner Arthur Schweitzer, cousin of Dr. Albert Schweitzer, purchased two adjacent parcels overlooking the Lac des Ibis between 1899 and 1900. He commissioned a residence in the “Grand Trianon” style, which he later named the “Palais Rose.”

Schweitzer and his wife had little opportunity to enjoy the property. The shipowner declared bankruptcy and the Palais Rose was sold at auction on July 19, 1906. Ratanji Jamsetji Tata, an Indian Parsi businessman, was the winning bidder. Legend has it that he funded the purchase “by selling two pearls and an emerald.” He never occupied his prize. However, there was no question of bankruptcy in his case. Having gotten no use from the building in two years, Tata agreed to part with it, selling the property to a man of letters who had instantly fallen in love with the Palais Rose.

In 1908, the poet Robert de Montesquiou first saw the house and declared: “If this house – which is not for sale and which my modest means would never allow me to buy – if this improbable, impossible, and nevertheless real house isn’t mine tomorrow, I’ll die!” The deed of sale was signed on October 29, 1908.

The house's occupancy by the Comte de Montesquiou was among the longest documented periods in the history of the Palais Rose in Vésinet. The count was a stylish figure, who lived in the Palais Rose for almost twenty years until his death in 1921. A great collector, with “a hereditary sense of magnificence,” (to quote his own words), he furnished the dwelling with an array of exotic objects. These included rich furnishings, paintings, and objets d’art. A separate building called “l'Ermitage” (“The Hermitage”) was built to house his collection of books.

The resident of the Palais Rose was also famed for his magnificent receptions. Although he enjoyed his own festivities, the Comte de Montesquiou took a dim view of the municipal celebrations organized right next to his property in the Allée des Fêtes. He deemed these gatherings to be noisy and too “popular.”

Although visitors were not as frequent as they had been when the poet resided in the Pavillon des Muses in Neuilly – Vésinet was more distant from Paris – he still received many distinguished guests. Some were friends of the moment, or not yet well-known; others were young people mentored by the aging poet. Among them were Gabriele d’Annunzio, Ida Rubinstein, Claude Debussy, Colette, Rodin, Sarah Bernhardt, Maurice Rostand, Jean Cocteau and Cécile Sorel.

When Montesquiou died, all his property – including the Palais Rose – was left to his secretary, Henry Pinard. He sold most of the furniture and objects before selling the property itself in May 1923 to Luisa Amman, the separated wife of the Marquis de Casati. Fascinated by animals, Marquise Luisa de Casati collected snakes and birds. She dedicated a winter garden near the west wing's grand salon to shelter her scaly and winged protégés. She also owned a “mechanical” stuffed panther that leaped and emitted flashes of light.

She also loved disguises and dyed her hair in an era where the practice was uncommon. Her predecessors’ festive gatherings had been remarkable, but the parties given by the Marquise de Casati left their own luminous memories It is said that she arranged dinners that were illumined by nothing but bulbs she wore as a necklace. Her homage to the magician Cagliostro is also recorded in the annals. She is remembered for a costume gala based on the theme of Louis XIV’s reign.

All these festivities came at a price, bringing about the marquise’s financial ruin. She was forced to abandon her furniture and home to creditors in 1934. The furnishings were sold at auction, which gave the Château de Versailles the opportunity to recover an enormous pink marble tub that had been purchased by Montesquiou and placed in his “Pavillon de l’Amour” in the garden. The house was handed over to Auguste-Eustache Leprévost, a creditor of Luisa Amman (the Marquise de Casati), who was ostensibly acting on behalf of the Société civile du Palais Rose.

The company attempted to resell the Palais Rose to the municipality of Vésinet. This effort failed in 1936. In order to settle the marquise's debts, the Société civile du Palais Rose decided to divide the domain to maximize its options, and the property was split into eight lots.

Lot no. 1, comprising the Palais Rose and the Ermitage, was purchased by Olivier Scrive in 1938. Together with his family, he attempted to reconstitute the property, restoring it to the state in which it was left by the Comte de Montesquiou in 1921 by buying four additional lots. In 1948, Olivier Scrive sold the Palais Rose to the Société Nouvelle du Palais Rose, of which he was the majority shareholder. He kept the Ermitage for his own use.

At the beginning of the Battle of France, Général de Gaulle, en route to take command of the Fourth Armored Division, accepted Mr. Scrive's hospitality. The general stayed at the Ermitage of the Palais Rose from May 12 to 15, 1940. A plaque mounted on the building and visible from rue Diderot commemorates this occasion.

During the 1950s, the plan for the municipality of Vésinet to purchase the property was revived by Lucie Valore, the wife of the famous painter Maurice Utrillo. She proclaimed to anyone who would listen that the municipality was about to acquire the property for the couple's use; in exchange, they would bequeath Maurice Utrillo’s paintings to the town. Due to failures of communication between the parties concerned, the plan never came to fruition.

When Olivier Scrive died in 1955, the Ermitage remained jointly owned by his heirs until they sold it in 1972 to Arnaud d’Aboville. It seems that Josephine Baker was among the ranks of potential purchasers, but she died before the sale. The Palais Rose itself, owned by the Société Nouvelle du Palais Rose, was sold to Maurice Blumental and Geneviève Leroy in May 1981. They also bought the Ermitage in April 1982, thus almost reconstituting the property as it had been in the days of Robert de Montesquiou.

The Palais Rose was purchased in the late 1990s by SCI Palais Rose. With the aim of restoring the complex, which had been registered as an historical monuments, this company requested the agency GRAHAL to perform a study. This work inaugurated an immense project during which Emad Khashoggi, heading up his company COGEMAD, completely restored and enlarged the Palais Rose. He scrupulously preserved the high quality of the site as recorded in the ISMH, the listing of regional historic monuments, on July 11, 1986.

== Architecture ==
The name of the original architect of the Palais Rose in Vésinet is unknown. The residence was built in the style of the Grand Trianon, and was inspired by that palace's architecture. Each subsequent owner contributed distinctive touches to the monument. Initially, when the Schweitzers were in residence, the main façade overlooking the Lac des Ibis on the east side of the building seems to have been particularly faithful to its model. Rectangular in shape, with just one level, it has two wings and a broad staircase with the same number of steps as in the one in the Grand Trianon. The facade features nine arched French windows separated by Ionic style pilasters of pink marble. There is also a similar entablature bordered by a balustrade. This ground floor consists of an enfilade of formal rooms (salons, dining room, and library). The owners’ private apartments (bedroom, boudoir or antechamber, and bathroom) were on the north side.

The rear façade had nothing in common with the Grand Trianon. It was built over a sub-basement and provided various service areas (kitchens, laundry room, boiler room, and servants’ bedrooms). To connect the upper and lower parts of the building, there were two intermediate level areas in the structure's wings, which overlook the garden.

The main floor originally had reception rooms with fifteen foot ceilings richly ornamented with boiseries and moldings. The dwelling's only master bedroom was also on this level. A very steep little staircase located in one of the halls gave access to a lower level where service areas such as the kitchen and laundry room had ceilings scarcely 7 feet high. All these lower rooms were provided with very tiny windows opening onto the garden. This architecture remained virtually unchanged until the 1980s. The modifications to the structure made by its various occupants were confined to interior decoration and redesign of the park until that date.

Tata evidently made no changes to the residence or the park. This is scarcely surprising, since he never occupied the residence. Robert de Montesquiou’s influence is more in evidence. A number of interior ornaments suggest that the poet left his mark on the house. The furnishings and decorative objects played a primary role in creating a personalized atmosphere, and he also added his family coat of arms. The “M” that adorns the fireplace over-mantel in the grand salon is one conspicuous example. He also redesigned the park. Having purchased a pink marble tub that had served as Madame de Montespan's bath, Montesquiou built a “Pavillon de l’Amour” in the garden modeled after the Petit Trianon’s pavilion. He located this temple at the intersection of two perpendicular allées that crossed the park, making the structure the garden's principal attraction, set picturesquely amidst the green lawns and foliage. He also had the park adorned with statues and busts honoring French poets. Jean de La Fontaine could be found there, along with Verlaine, during the fête described above. In 1912, he enlarged the property with the acquisition of an additional parcel that was to become the site of the Ermitage; it was here that he built the library.

The Marquise de Casati adapted the residence to accommodate her menagerie of exotic snakes. In the west wing's winter garden, she installed two heated glass cages. Perhaps regrettably, the creatures did not survive. There are also hints of the delight she took in lavish entertaining. She should probably be credited for the backlit marble and alabaster sun that decorates the floor of the grand salon. On the other hand, she evidently did not make any changes to the park; it is unclear whether she continued to use the Ermitage as a library.

There were no substantial changes to the Palais Rose until it was purchased by Mr. and Mrs. Blumental in the early 1980s. (At this point, it was separate from the Ermitage.) The couple commissioned the Parisian architect Jean-Louis Cardin for the work. He modified the north, south, and west façades, as well as the building's interior layout. He eliminated the mezzanine levels in the west wing, completely altering the arrangement of the rooms and remodeling the private apartment. On the exterior, he redid the balustrade, and restored the masonry, removing its gold patina. He applied stone surfacing to the base of the building to “emphasize its massiveness, which was necessary to display the main floor to the best advantage.” When the Blumentals purchased the Ermitage in April 1982, they again commissioned Jean-Louis Cardin to carry out the restoration.

In 1999, SCI Palais Rose began restoration and renovation on an unprecedented scale. The work was not completed until 2005. Emad Khashoggi, a specialist in the restoration of historic monuments, directed this project undertaken by his company COGEMAD. The very extensive work performed resulted in a number of significant modifications, while conserving the portion of the building registered in the list of historic monuments.

- The ceiling height of the lower level (ground floor) was increased from less than 7 feet to almost 11 feet by lowering the floor. All the windows were enlarged and converted to double French doors. This level now houses the private apartments, which were formerly located on the upper floor.
- There was additional excavation to add a basement level, lit by skylights. This area is now used as recreational space and includes an exercise room, a film theatre, a swimming pool, a game room, and a garage.
- The residence was comprehensively modernized, with new electrical, heating, plumbing, and home automation systems.
- The former interior decoration was restored by specialized artisans from the Monuments Historiques organization. Highly skilled gilders, sculptors, cabinetmakers, marble workers, and masons refurbished the interiors using the traditional techniques of each craft.
- A monumental 270 square foot staircase now connects the various levels.
- The Ermitage has been modernized and is now a freestanding three-level structure that can accommodate guest apartments.

== Literary anecdotes ==
- The Palais Rose was used as the setting for one of the adventures of the famed gentleman thief Arsène Lupin: La Cagliostro se venge.
- The Palais Rose in Vésinet has a significant role in the last novel by Camille de Peretti, published by Editions Stock in+- 2011, which tells the extraordinary tale of the Marquise de Casati.

== Gallery ==
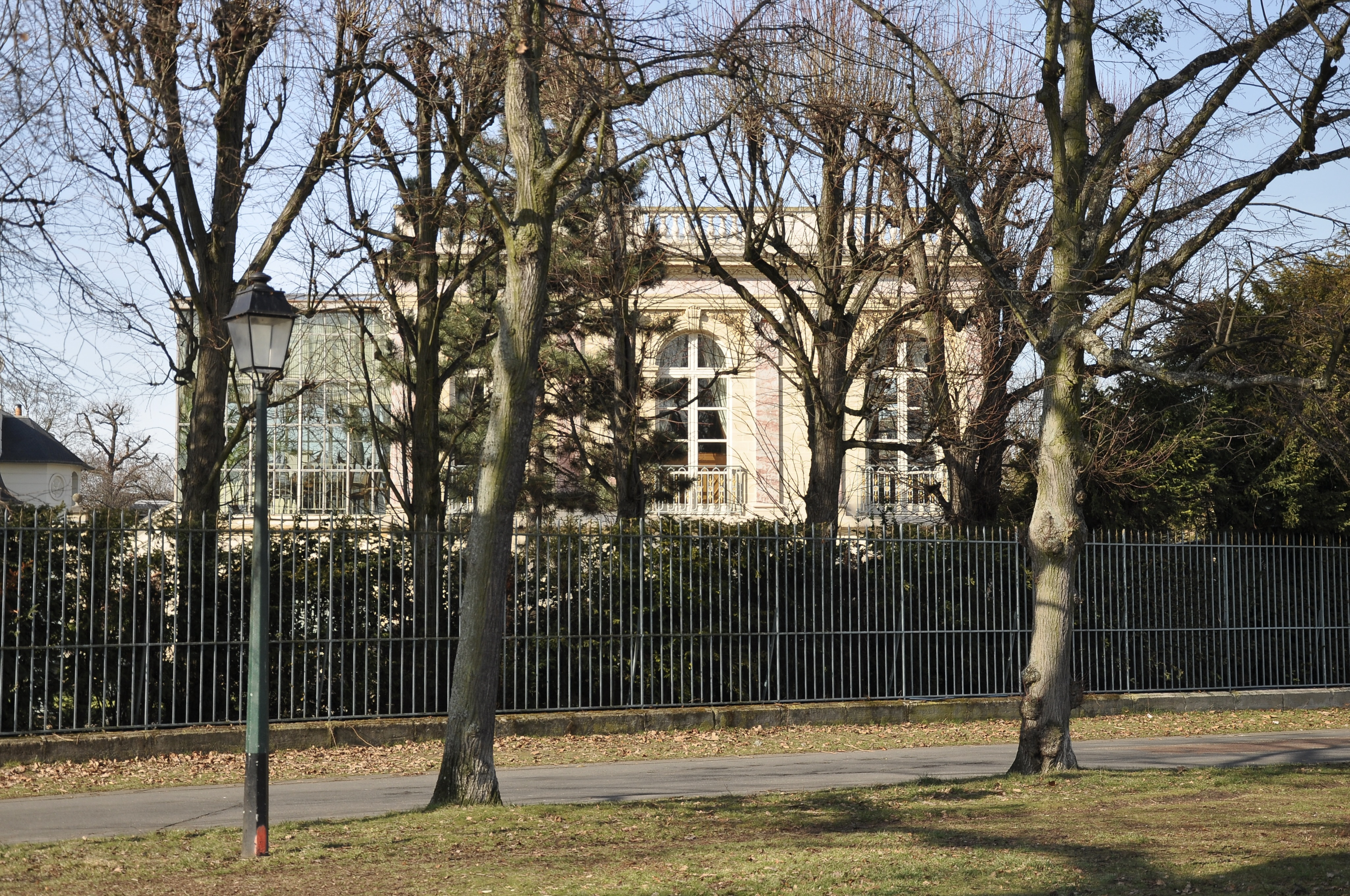
View from l'allée des Fêtes.

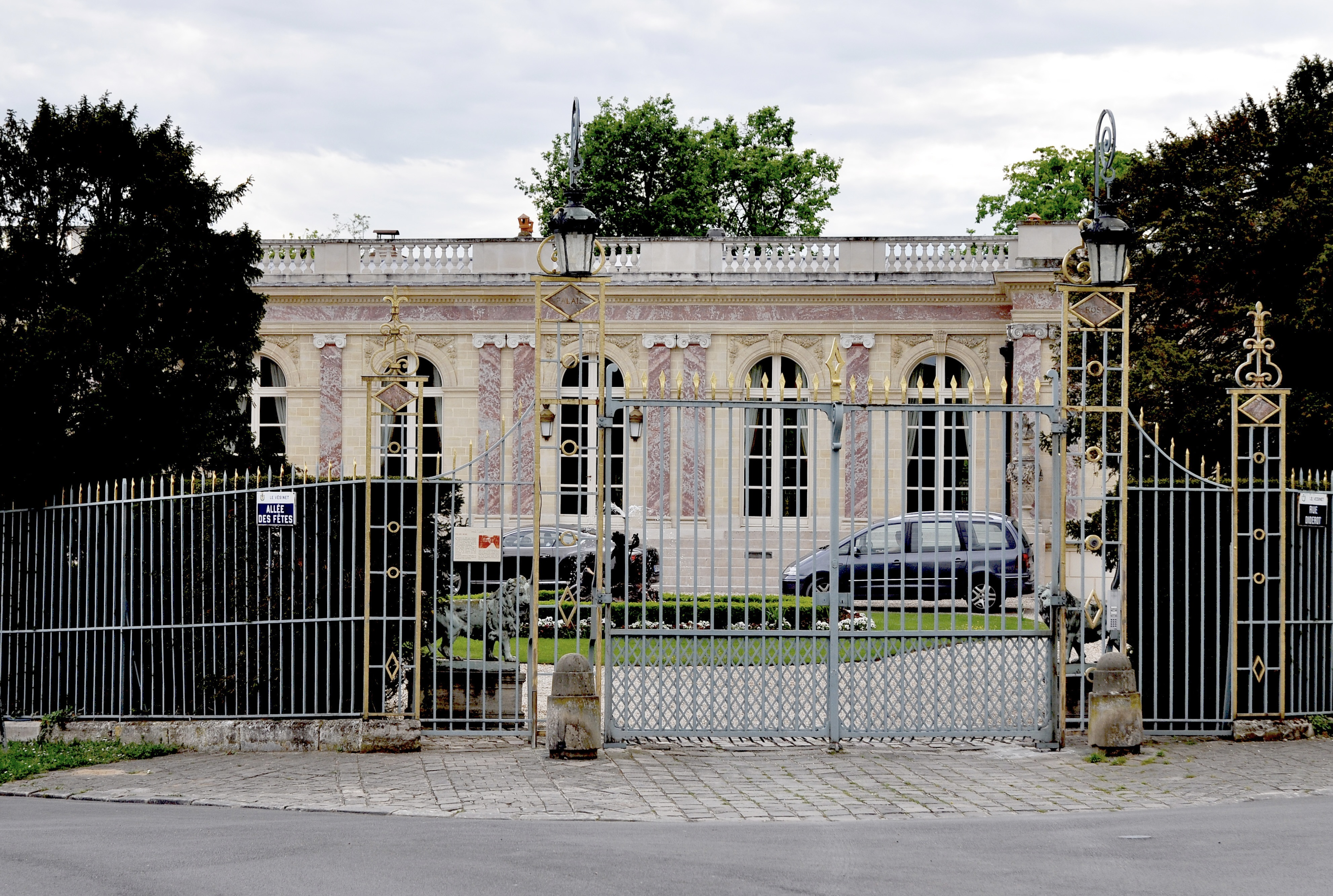
Front gate.

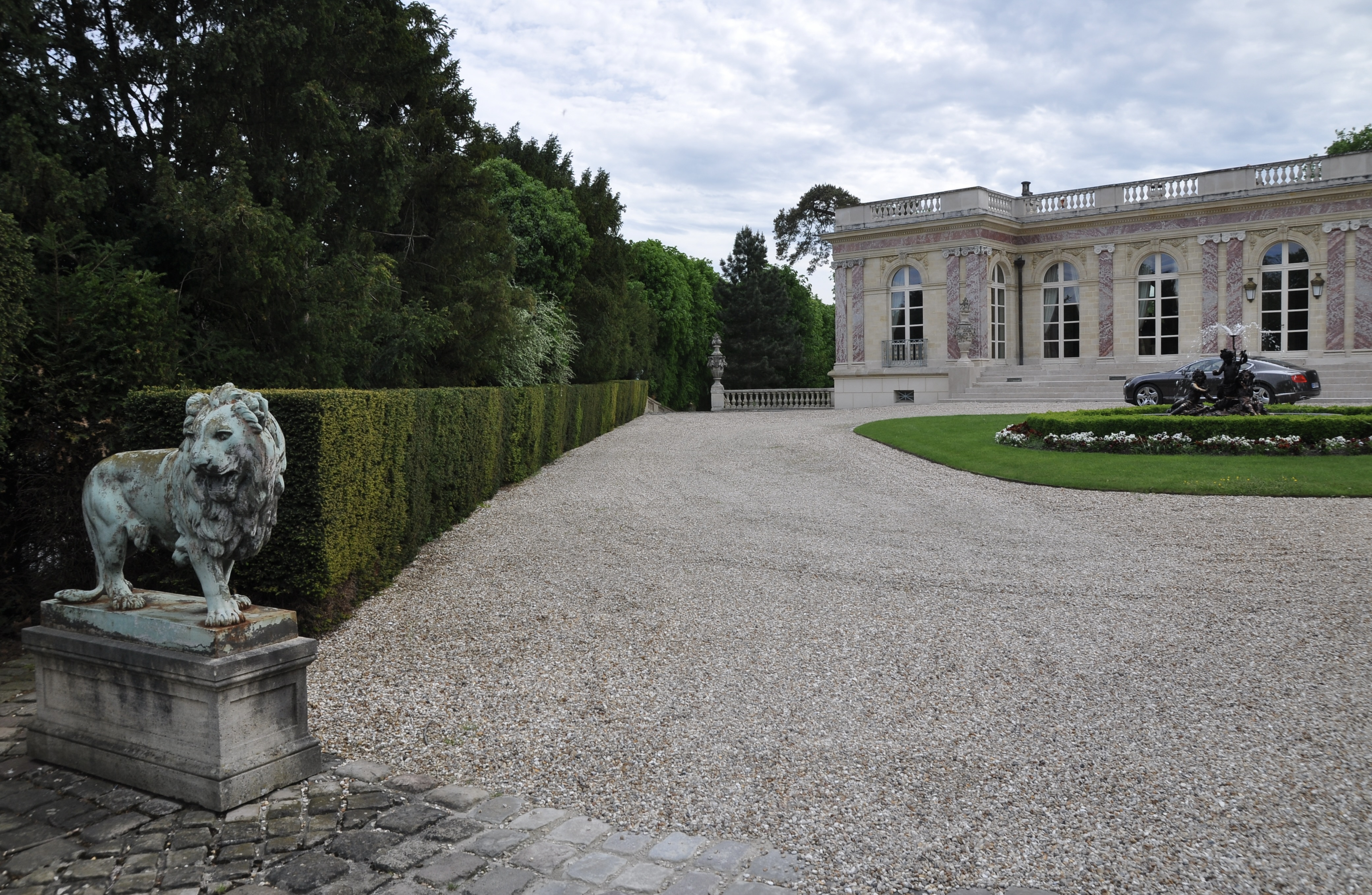
The courtyard.

== Bibliography ==
- Le Vésinet, Modèle français d’urbanisme paysager 1858/1930, Cahiers de l’Inventaire général des Monuments et des Richesses de la France, n°17, Paris, Sophie Cueille, 1989, p. 72-75.
- La Curieuse Histoire du Vésinet, Ville du Vésinet, Georges Poisson, 1975, 211 p.
- Revue Municipale du Vésinet, 1982.
- Enquête GRAHAL (Groupe Recherche Art Histoire Architecture et Littérature), under the direction of Michel Borjon, 1999.
- Website of the Société d’Histoire du Vésinet on the Palais Rose.
- Château Louis XIV, éd. Connaissance des Arts, mai 2012.
