= Marly series =

Paintings by Alfred Sisley

The Marly series is a series of twenty oil on canvas paintings by Alfred Sisley of the town of Marly-Le-Roi. Sisley lived in the town from his return from a painting trip to England at the end of 1874 until he moved to live in Sèvres in August 1877.

== List ==
Title	Museum	Town	Country	Dimensions (cm)	Year	No.	Image
The Watering Trough at Marly					1873	D69	
The Watering Trough at Marly-le-Roi	National Gallery	London	United Kingdom	49,5 × 65,4	1875	D152	
The Watering Trough at Marly-le-Roi, Snow or Winter Day at Marly	Private collection	New York		50 × 65	1875	D154	
The Watering Trough at Marly in Winter	Frye Art Museum			38 x 55	1875	D153	
The Watering Trough at Marly, Snow	Private collection				1875	D157	
The Basin at Marly	Kunsthaus Zürich	Zürich	Switzerland	46 × 61	1875	D158	
The Watering Trough at Marly	Art Institute of Chicago	Chicago	USA	39.5 × 56.2	1875	D169	
14th July at Marly-le-Roi	The Higgins Art Gallery & Museum	Bedford	United Kingdom	53 × 72	1875	D170	
The Watering Trough at Marly in Summer	Private collection, Jacques Guerlain				1875	D171	
Horse Bathing at Port-Marly, or The Watering Trough at Marly	Virginia Museum of Fine Arts	Richmond	USA	38 × 61	1875	D172	
The Seine at Port-Marly, Piles of Sand	Art Institute of Chicago	Chicago	USA			D173	
The Blocked Seine at Port-Marly	Montserrat Museum	Montserrat Abbey	Spain	38 × 55	1876	D243	
The Watering Trough at Marly with Hoarfrost	Virginia Museum of Fine Arts	Richmond	USA	37 × 54	1876	D244	
Winter - Effect of Snow - Route de l'Abreuvoir	Palais des beaux-arts de Lille	Lille	France	46 × 55	1876	D247	

== See also ==
- List of paintings by Alfred Sisley
