= Battle of La Marfée =

1641 battle of the Franco-Spanish War

Coordinates: 49.7025°N 4.9411°E

- Part of the Franco-Spanish War (1635–59)
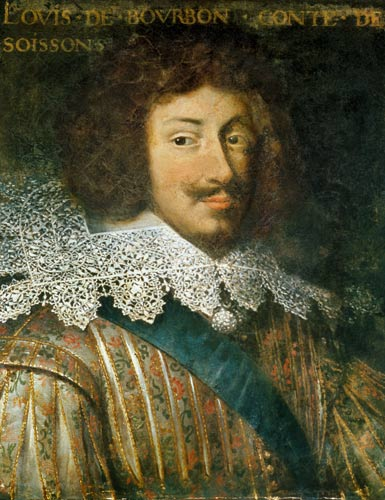
- French rebel leader Louis de Bourbon, Count of Soissons
Date	6 July 1641
Location	La Marfée, near Sedan, France
Result	Imperial-Spanish victory

Belligerents
France	Holy Roman Empire; Spain (Kingdom of France) French rebels Principality of Sedan

Commanders and leaders
(Kingdom of France) Gaspard III de Coligny (Kingdom of France) Marquis de Praslin † (Kingdom of France) Puységur † (Kingdom of France) Marquis Sourdis †	(Spain) Guillaume de Lamboy (Kingdom of France) Count of Soissons † (Kingdom of France) Frédéric Maurice de Bouillon (Kingdom of France) Henri de Guise

Strength
6,000 infantry, 1,400 cavalry	7,000 infantry, 2,500 cavalry

Casualties and losses
200–300 killed or wounded 4,000 captured	Nominal

The Battle of La Marfée (Note: Also known as the Battle of Sedan) took place on 6 July 1641, during the 1635 to 1659 Franco-Spanish War. Fought near Sedan, France, a French army led by the Duke of Châtillon, was defeated by an Imperial-Spanish force under Lamboy, supported by French rebels led by the Comte de Soissons and Bouillon.

The right wing of the French army ran into heavy artillery fire and collapsed under pressure from the Imperial cavalry, taking heavy casualties. Their opponents suffered only minor losses, but one of these was Soissons, who was killed in the closing moments, allegedly by using a loaded pistol to open his helmet. The loss of his leadership meant the battle ultimately made little difference to the overall strategic position.

== Background ==
17th century Europe was dominated by the struggle between the Bourbon kings of France, and their Habsburg rivals in Spain and the Holy Roman Empire. Habsburg possessions bordered France in the Spanish Netherlands, Franche-Comté, Alsace, Roussillon and Lorraine (see Map). France supported Habsburg opponents in the Thirty Years War, the Dutch Revolt, and insurgencies in Portugal, Catalonia and Naples.

For their part, Spain and Austria financed Huguenot rebellions in South-Western France, and the Cévennes, as well as internal conspiracies against the French government, led by Cardinal Richelieu. Although a major rebellion was defeated in 1632, plotting continued, led by a mix of Huguenot exiles, and great feudal lords who resented their loss of power. Backed by Spanish money, some went to London, seeking support from Charles I; English foreign policy was generally pro-Spanish, but his wife was the younger sister of Louis XIII, and the 1638 to 1651 War of the Three Kingdoms intervened.

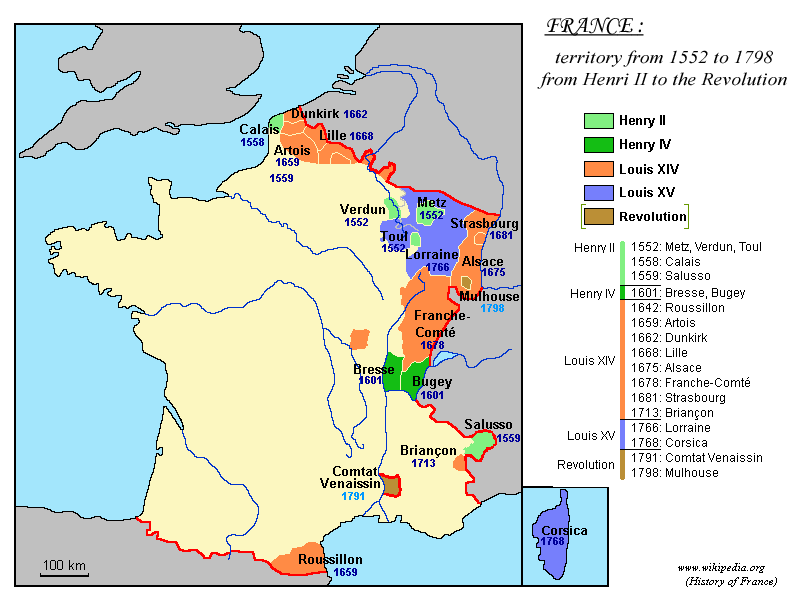
France 1552-1798

Facing French-backed revolts in Catalonia and Portugal, in early 1641 Spanish chief minister Olivares made contact with two of Richelieu's domestic opponents, Soissons and Henri II de Guise. Claiming Richelieu was deliberately continuing the war in order to retain power, the two had taken refuge in Sedan, then part of the Holy Roman Empire. This was held by the duc de Bouillon, elder brother of Turenne.

The French Army of Champagne occupied Lorraine in 1634, then Breisach in 1638, but by 1641 it was largely composed of low quality troops. All sides found it increasingly difficult to recruit and support armies on multiple fronts, so even a minor intervention could make a difference. Olivares planned simultaneous uprisings under Soissons in Sedan, with another in the south-western province of Guyenne that never materialised.

Richelieu was advised of the plot well in advance, and in April 1641, he ordered Châtillon to invest Sedan; Châtillon objected, claiming to have less than 6,000 infantry and 1,400 cavalry, when he needed at least 8,000 infantry and 2,500 cavalry, plus a reserve force of 4,000 under Marquis de Sourdis. In response to requests for support from Soissons, Cardinal-Infante Ferdinand of Austria, Governor of the Spanish Netherlands, supplied him with money to recruit mercenaries, plus 7,000 men under Lamboy.

== The battle ==
Eastern France, 1634 to 1644 (major battles indicated by dates)

On 25 June, the French occupied positions opposite Sedan on the eastern bank of the Meuse, but they were dislodged by cannon fire from the town. Châtillon moved further up the Meuse, to Remilly-Aillicourt, with Lamboy's troops on the opposite bank at Bazeilles. Here he waited for promised reinforcements from Charles of Lorraine, which never arrived.

Soissons and Bouillon left Sedan on 5 July with 3,000 French volunteers and Walloon mercenaries, taking position around the village of La Marfée, where they were joined by Lamboy. The Spanish infantry deployed in a nearby wood under Lamboy, with Bouillon's cavalry on flat ground to their left, and Soissons with the reserve.

The morning of 6 July began with heavy rain, which delayed the French until after 10:00; they formed two columns, reaching La Marfée an hour later. On arrival, Châtillon found his artillery, which consisted of four light guns, was in the rear, and so rather than waiting, sent his infantry into the woods.

The Spanish initially gave ground, before the French ran into point blank artillery fire, and fell back. As they did so, Bouillon charged the French right; their commander, the Marquis de Praslin, was killed and his troops dissolved in panic, riding over their own infantry, who also broke. The cavalry on the left held their ground and retired in good order, but the battle was over in less than 45 minutes. The French lost 4,000 prisoners, plus their artillery and baggage train.

== Aftermath ==
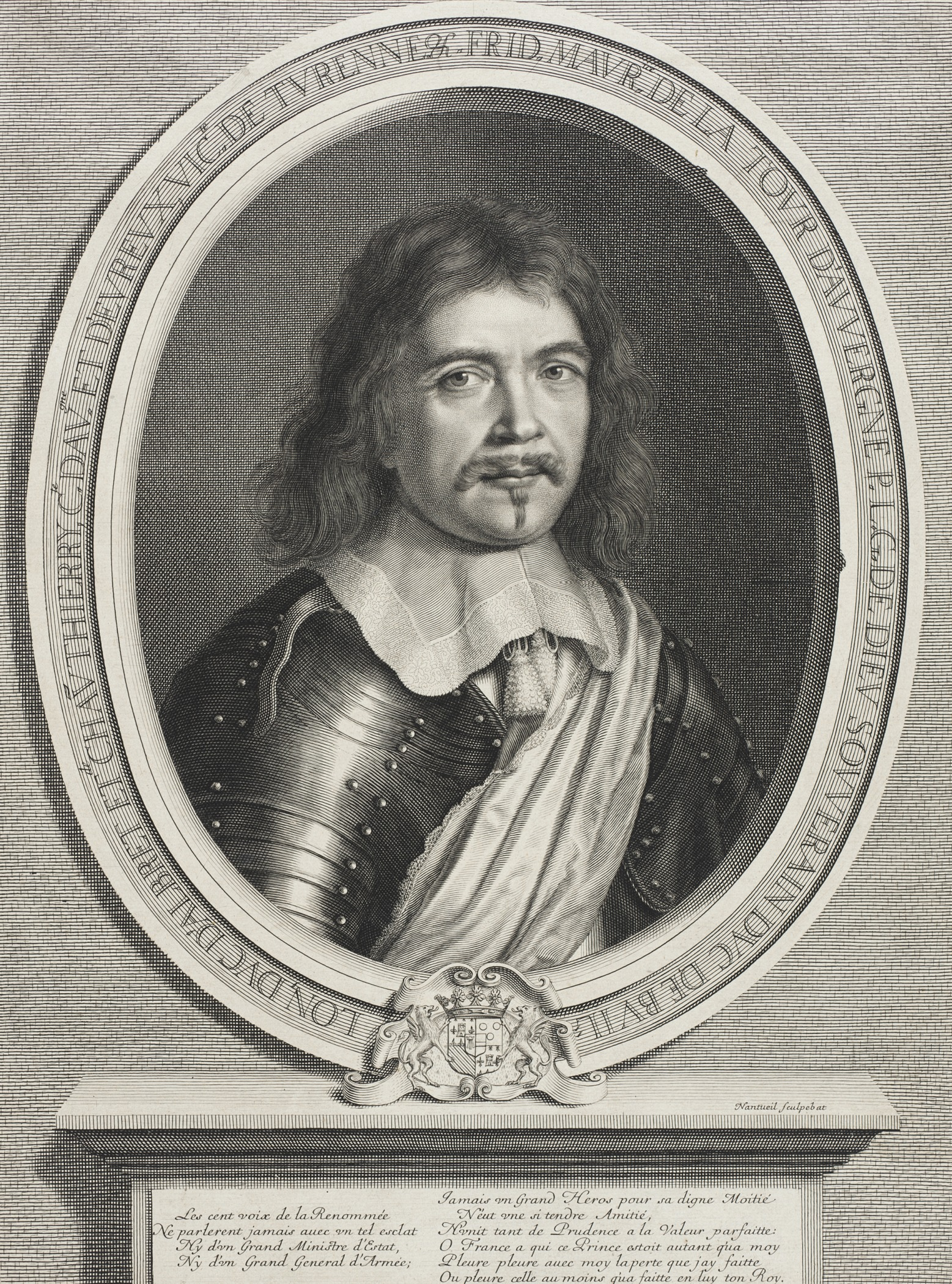
Duc de Bouillon

Châtillon, several of his senior officers, and 200 cavalry stopped at Rethel, where they rallied the fugitives. Charles of Lorraine now joined Lamboy, who stopped to capture Donchery, north of Sedan; this held them up until 14 July, allowing Châtillon and his remnants to reach Reims. Here they met Louis XIII, and a small force under Maillé-Brézé.

Soissons died at the end of the action, apparently when a loaded pistol he was using to raise his helmet visor went off. Although his death ended the conspiracy, La Marfée prevented Châtillon's army supporting the French offensive in Flanders as intended. After La Meilleraye captured Aire-sur-la-Lys on 27 July, Lamboy was sent north, where he joined the Cardinal-Infante; they re-captured Lillers, then besieged Aire. In an attempt to relieve the town, the French took Lens, La Bassée and Bapaume, but Aire surrendered on 7 December.

Plots against Richelieu continued until his death in December 1642, the most serious being that known as 'Cinq Mars' in June 1642. This featured many of those involved with Soissons, including Gaston of Orléans, and the Marquis de Cinq-Mars, who was executed. Shortly before the French victory at Rocroi in May 1643, Louis XIII died, and was succeeded by his five year old son, Louis XIV, a Regency Council ruling in his name. This resulted in a power struggle between the Queen Mother, supported by Cardinal Mazarin, and Condé, victor of Rocroi, a member of the royal family, and effective ruler of large parts of eastern France.

When Condé was arrested during the 1648 to 1653 Fronde, Bouillon and Turenne joined forces to demand his release. Both switched sides in 1650, and in return for ceding Sedan and Raucourt, Bouillon received the duchies of Albret and Château-Thierry, plus the counties of Auvergne and Évreux. He died at Pontoise on 9 August 1652.

== Sources ==
- Bissell, Gerhard (1997). Pierre le Gros, 1666-1719 (in German). ISBN 0-9529925-0-7.
- De Périni, Hardÿ (1898). Batailles françaises, 1621 to 1643 Volume III (in French). Paris: Ernest Flammarion.
- Elliott, JH (1989). The Count-Duke of Olivares: The Statesman in an Age of Decline. Yale University Press. ISBN 978-0300044997.
- Elliott, JH (1984). Richelieu and Olivares (Cambridge Studies in Early Modern History). Cambridge University Press. ISBN 978-0521262057.
- Huberty, Michel; Giraud, Alain; Magdelaine, F (1985). L'Allemagne Dynastique, Tome IV -- Wittelsbach (in French). Laballery. ISBN 2-901138-04-7.
- Jensen, De Lamar (1985). "The Ottoman Turks in Sixteenth Century French Diplomacy". The Sixteenth Century Journal. 16 (4): 451–470. doi:10.2307/2541220. JSTOR 2541220.
- Monter, William (1999). Cultural Exchange in Early Modern Europe 1400–1700. Vol. 2. Cambridge University Press. ISBN 978-0521845472.
- Parrott, David (2001). Richelieu's Army: War, Government and Society in France, 1624–1642. Cambridge University Press. ISBN 978-0521792097.
- Peyran, Jacques (1826). Histoire de l'ancienne principauté de Sedan, jusqu'à la fin du dix-huitième siècle, Volume II (in French). Sedan: Servier, Hennuy.
- Puységur, Jacques de Chastenet (1690). Les Mémoires de Jacques de Chastenet, Seigneur de Puysegur Volume I (in French). Amsterdam: Abraham Wolfgang.
- Thion, Stephane (2013). French Armies of the Thirty Years War (Soldiers of the Past). Histoire et Collections. ISBN 978-2917747018.
- Wilson, Peter (2009). Europe's Tragedy: A History of the Thirty Years War. Allen Lane. ISBN 978-0713995923.
