= Louveciennes =

- Commune
- Town hall

- Coat of arms
- Location of Louveciennes
- Location within France Location within Île-de-France (region)
- Coordinates: 48°51′39″N 2°07′02″E
- Country: France
- Region: Île-de-France
- Department: Yvelines
- Arrondissement: Saint-Germain-en-Laye
- Canton: Le Chesnay-Rocquencourt
- Intercommunality: CA Saint Germain Boucles Seine

Government
  - Mayor (2021–2026): Marie-Dominique Parisot
- Area^{1}: 5.37 km^{2} (2.07 sq mi)
- Elevation: 140 m (460 ft)
- Highest elevation: 180 m (590 ft)
- Lowest elevation: 80 m (260 ft)
- Population (2023): 7,990
  - Density: 1,490/km^{2} (3,850/sq mi)
- Demonym: Louveciennois
- Time zone: UTC+01:00 (CET)
  - Summer (DST): UTC+02:00 (CEST)
- INSEE/Postal code: 78350 /78430
- Website: www.louveciennes.fr
- ^{1} French Land Register data, which excludes lakes, ponds, glaciers > 1 km^{2} (0.386 sq mi or 247 acres) and river estuaries.

Louveciennes (French pronunciation: [luv(ə)sjɛn]) is a commune in the western suburbs of Paris, in the Yvelines department in the Île-de-France region in northern France. It is located between Versailles and Saint-Germain-en-Laye, bordering La Celle-Saint-Cloud and Marly-le-Roi.

Louveciennes is on the left bank of the Seine and includes part of the Île de la Loge (Loge Island) in the river. It is part of the Pays des Impressionnistes, owing to its history of being frequented by 19th-century Impressionist painters, including Renoir, Pissarro, Sisley and Monet.

== History ==
Until 1964, Louveciennes belonged to the former Seine-et-Oise department.

NATO had barracks for SHAPE here from 1959–1967, and the American School of Paris was located nearby from 1959 to 1967.

== Population ==
Historical population
Year	Pop.	±% p.a.
1968	4,475	—
1975	7,488	+7.63%
1982	7,338	−0.29%
1990	7,446	+0.18%
1999	7,111	−0.51%
2007	7,247	+0.24%
2012	7,120	−0.35%
2017	7,099	−0.06%
2023	7,990	+1.99%
Source: INSEE

== Sights ==
Local sights include:

- Many châteaux from the 17th and 18th century, later refurbished (Château de Voisins, Château du Pont, Château du Parc, Château des Sources, Château de Prunay)
- The Pavillon des Eaux, built in 1684 by Louis XIV and given to Madame du Barry by Louis XV
- The Louveciennes Aqueduct of the Machine de Marly
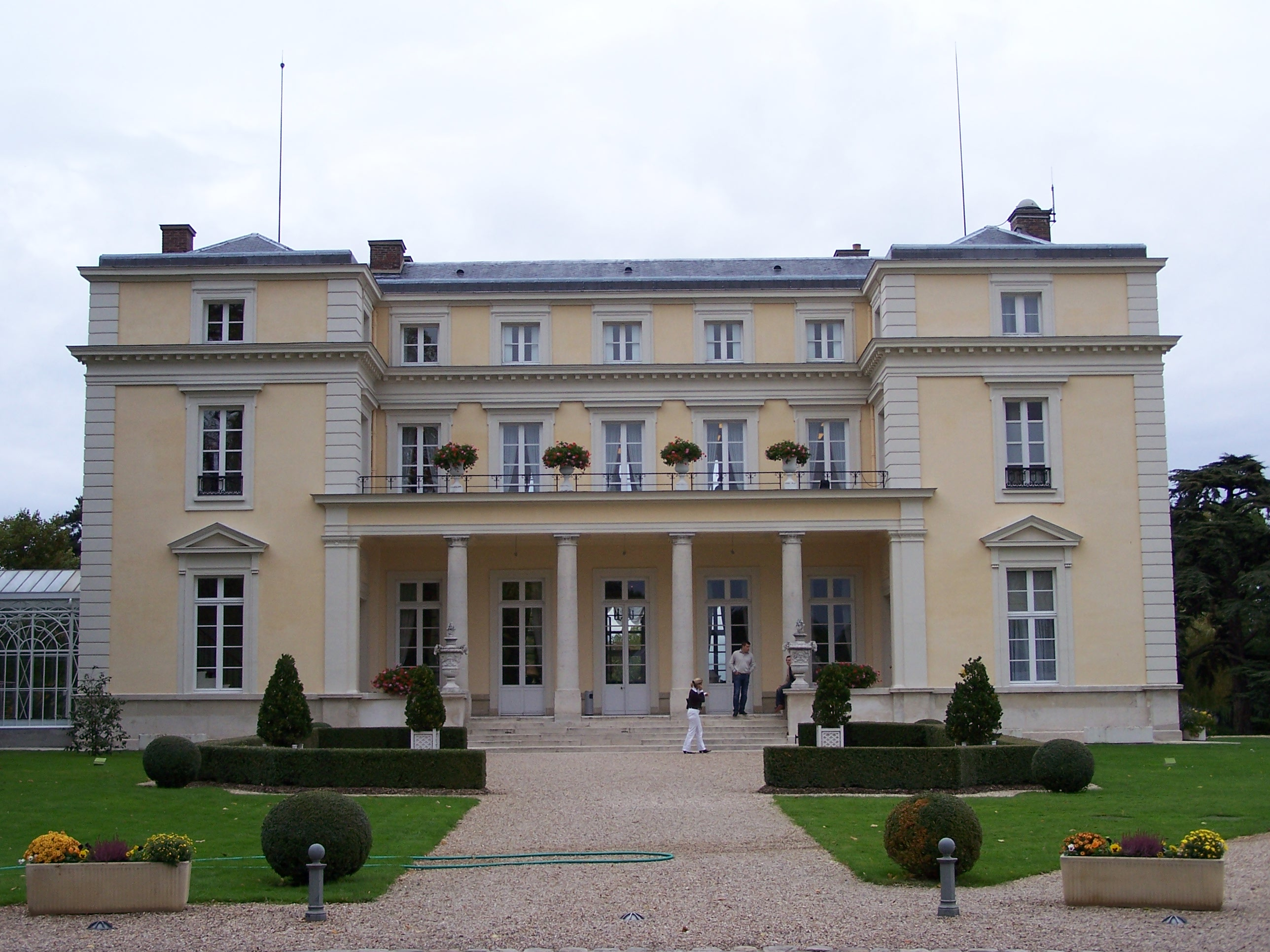
Château de Voisins

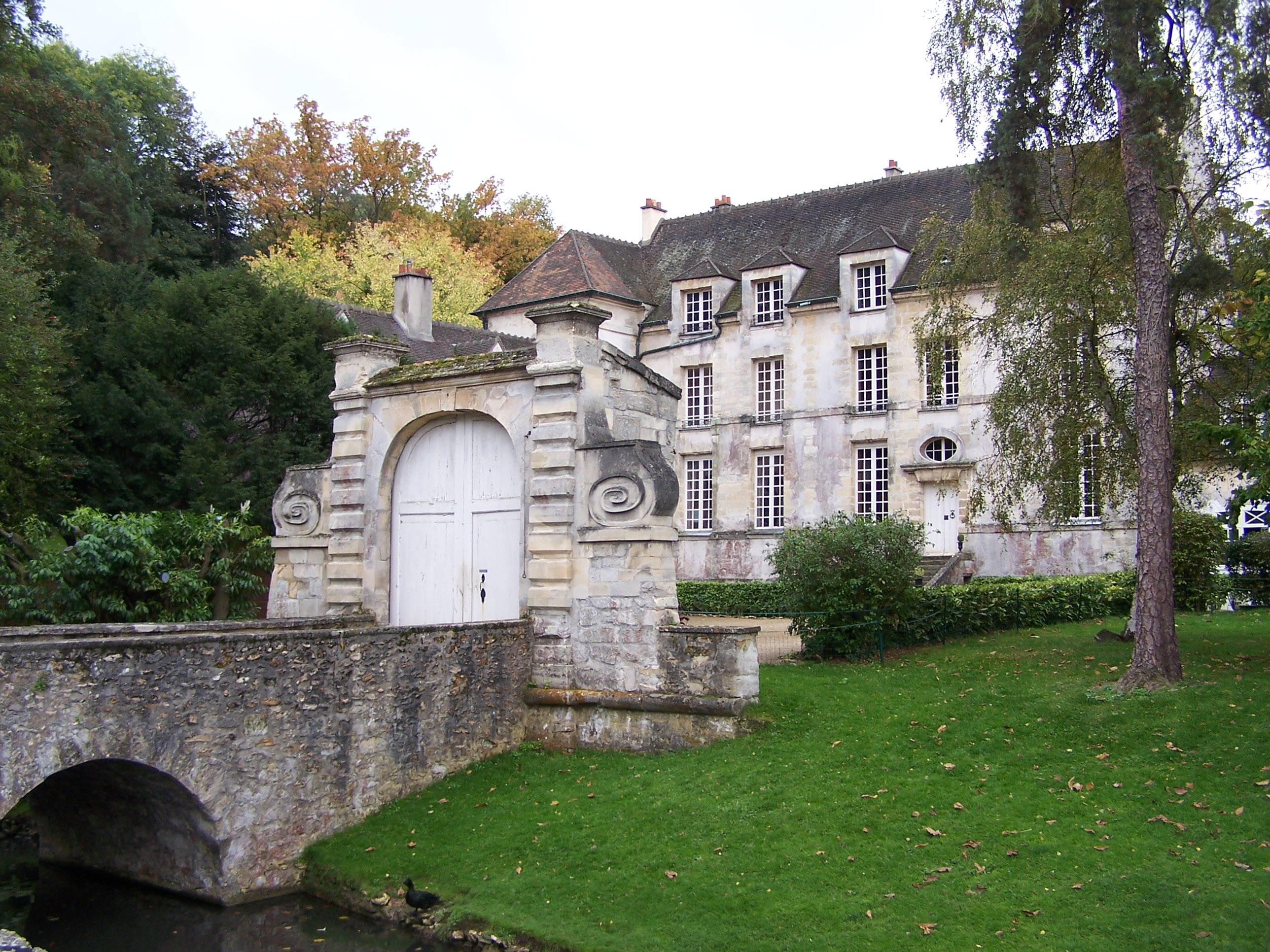
Château du Pont

== Culture ==
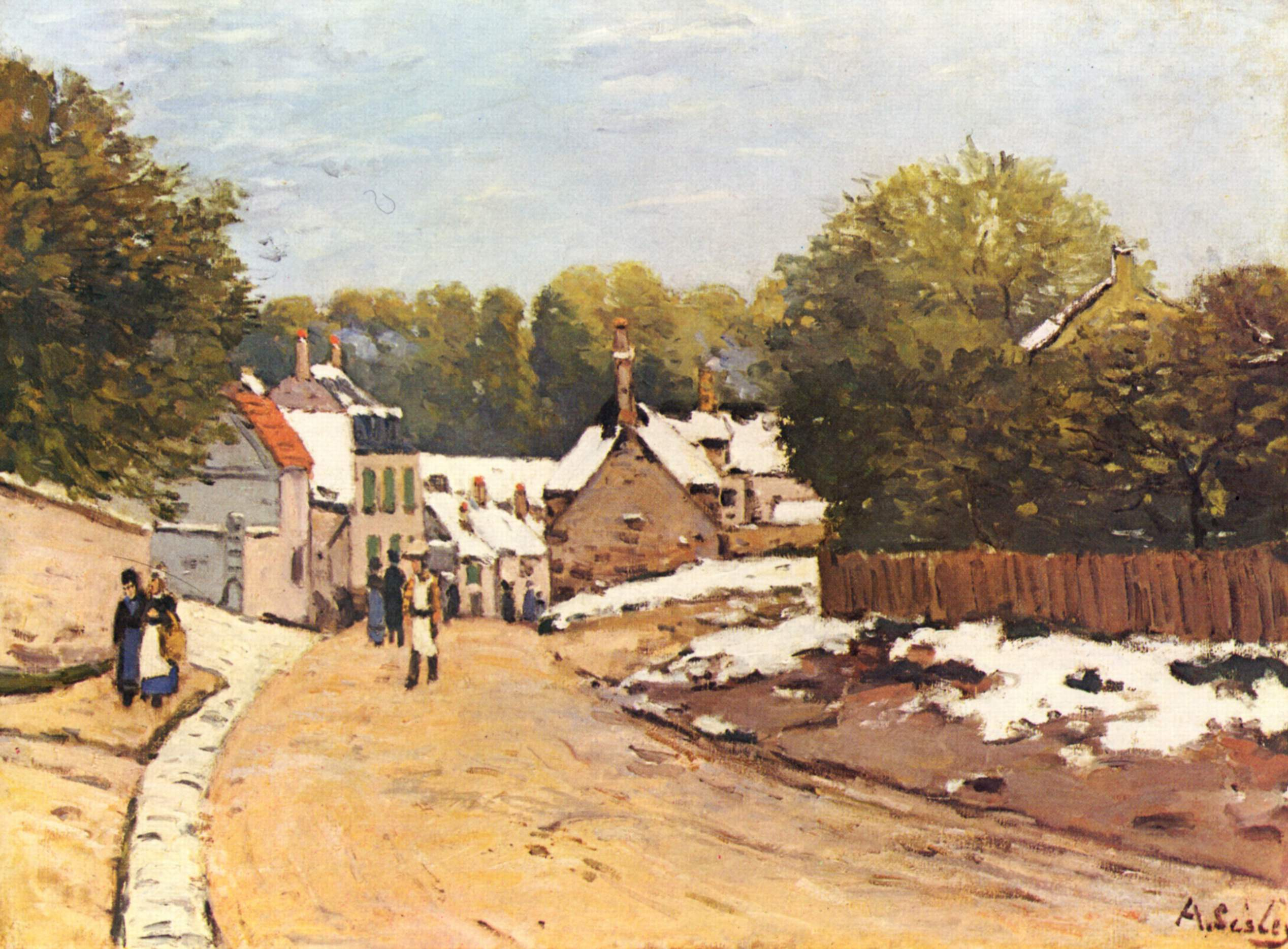
First snow in Louveciennes by Alfred Sisley, 1870

Louveciennes was frequented by Impressionist painters in the 19th century; there are over 120 paintings by Renoir, Pissarro, Sisley, and Monet depicting Louveciennes.

The composer Camille Saint-Saëns lived in Louveciennes from 1865 to 1870. Marie Louise Élisabeth Vigée-Lebrun, the most famous female painter of the 18th century, is buried at the Cimetière de Louveciennes near her old home. Anaïs Nin was a popular Cuban novelist born in Neuilly-sur-Seine and lived in Louveciennes from 1930 to 1936 at 2 bis, rue Montbuisson. Her career as an author started in this town.

Marshal Joseph Joffre, the commander of the French Army at the start of the First World War, built a property, La Châtaigneraie, at Louveciennes, and is buried in its garden. The tomb is not open to the public, and can only be seen at a ceremony on 11 November.

Louis, 7th duc de Broglie, physicist and Nobel Prize laureate, died in Louveciennes 19 March 1987. Orchestra conductor Charles Munch resided in Louveciennes at Place Emile Dreux, in the village of Voisins during the last decade of his life (1958–68). A plaque to that effect has been placed on the residence.

L'Aqueduc à Marly by Alfred Sisley, 1874

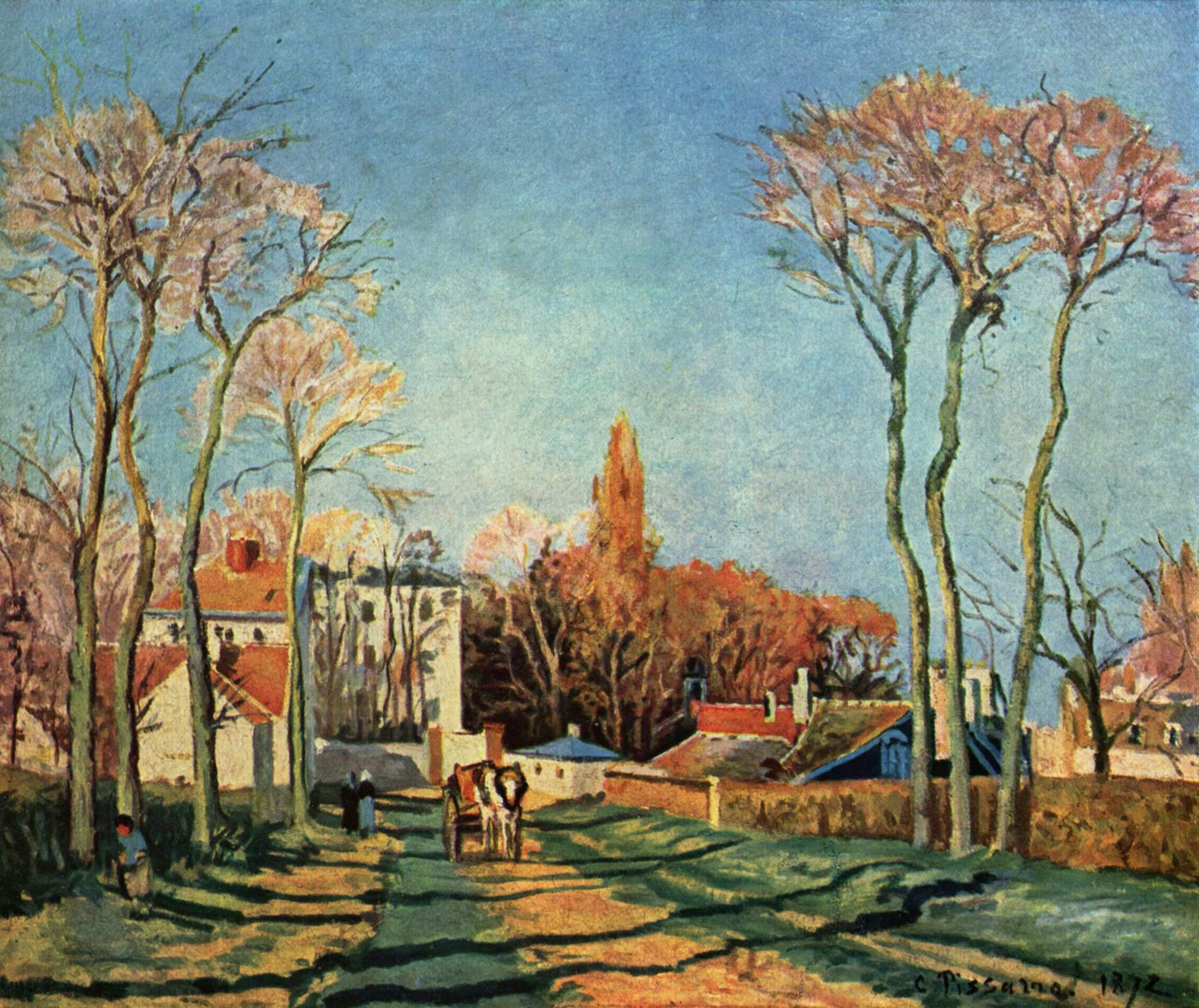
Entrée du village de Voisins by Camille Pissarro, 1872

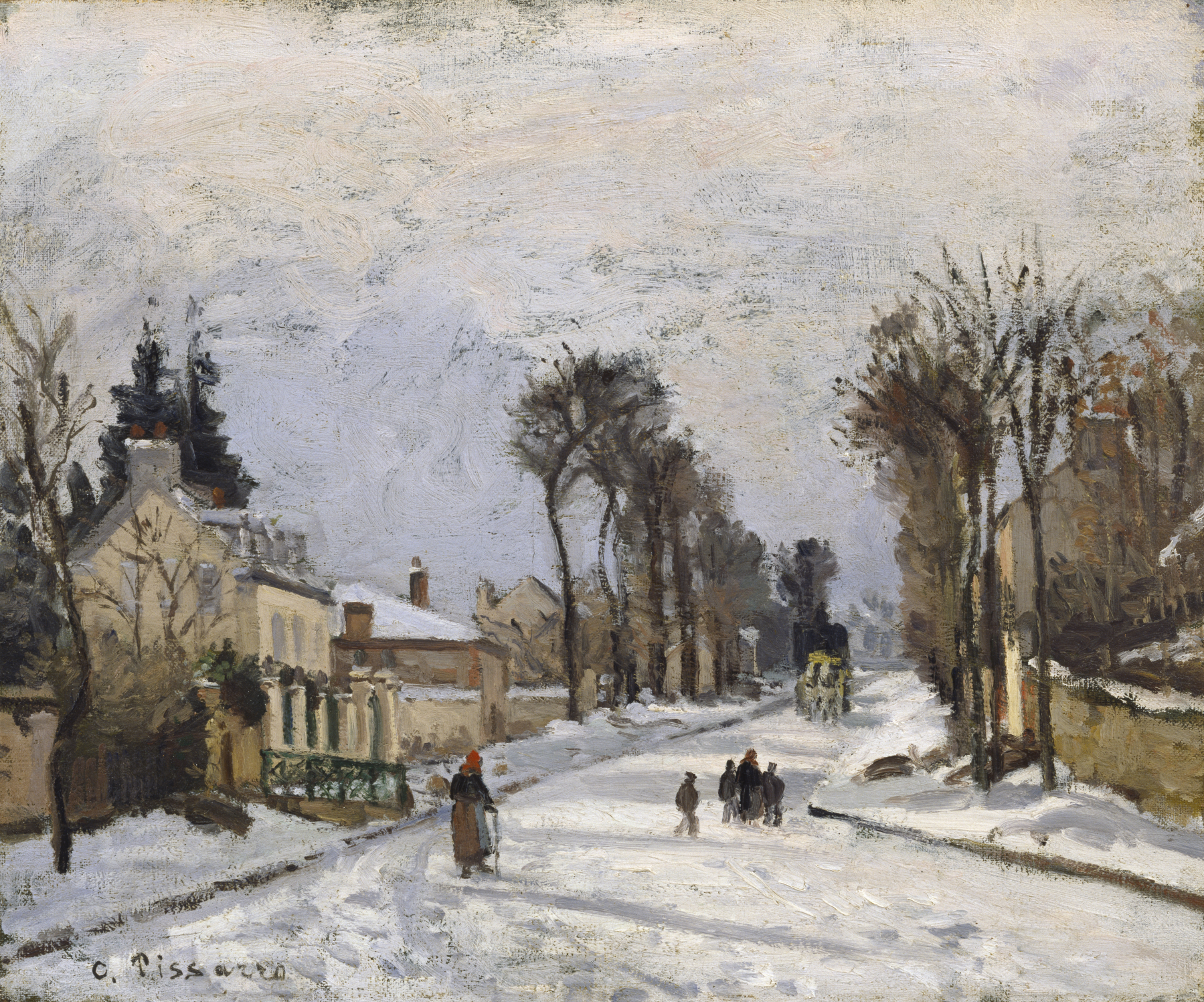
Road to Versailles at Louveciennes by Camille Pissarro, The Walters Art Museum.

== Transport ==
Louveciennes station

Louveciennes is served by Louveciennes station on Transilien Line L.

== Economy ==
After SHAPE left France, the French government allocated the property to CII, which soon thereafter became part of CII Honeywell Bull. Groupe Bull still has offices in Louveciennes.

== Twin towns ==
Louveciennes is twinned with:

- Radlett, United Kingdom, 20 km (12 mi) north of London – since 1983
- Meersburg, Germany, at the shores of Lake Constance – since 1991
- Vama, Romania, 450 km (280 mi) north of Bucharest – since 2000

== Notable people ==
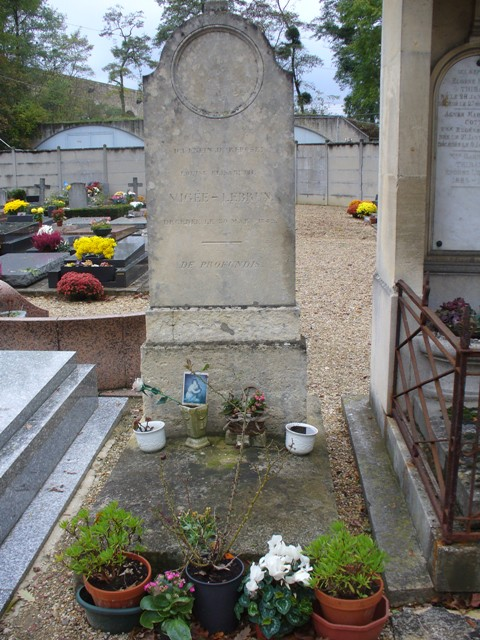
Élisabeth Vigée Le Brun’s grave in Louveciennes. Her epitaph says "Ici, enfin, je repose..." (Here, at last, I rest...).

- Madame du Barry (1743–1793), the last maîtresse-en-titre of King Louis XV of France
- Élisabeth Vigée Le Brun (1755–1842), a prominent portrait painter, official portraitist of Marie Antoinette
- Armand Gagné (1771–1792), adopted son of Marie Antoinette
- Alfred Sisley (1839–1899), Impressionist painter
- Maréchal Joseph Joffre (1852–1931), general
- François Coty (1874–1934), perfumer, businessman, newspaper publisher, politician and patron of the arts
- Marcel Jean (1900–1993), Surrealist painter, writer, and sculptor
- Anaïs Nin (1903–1977), author

== See also ==
- Communes of the Yvelines department
- Château Louis XIV
- Shirley Jaffe
