= Marly-le-Roi =

- Commune
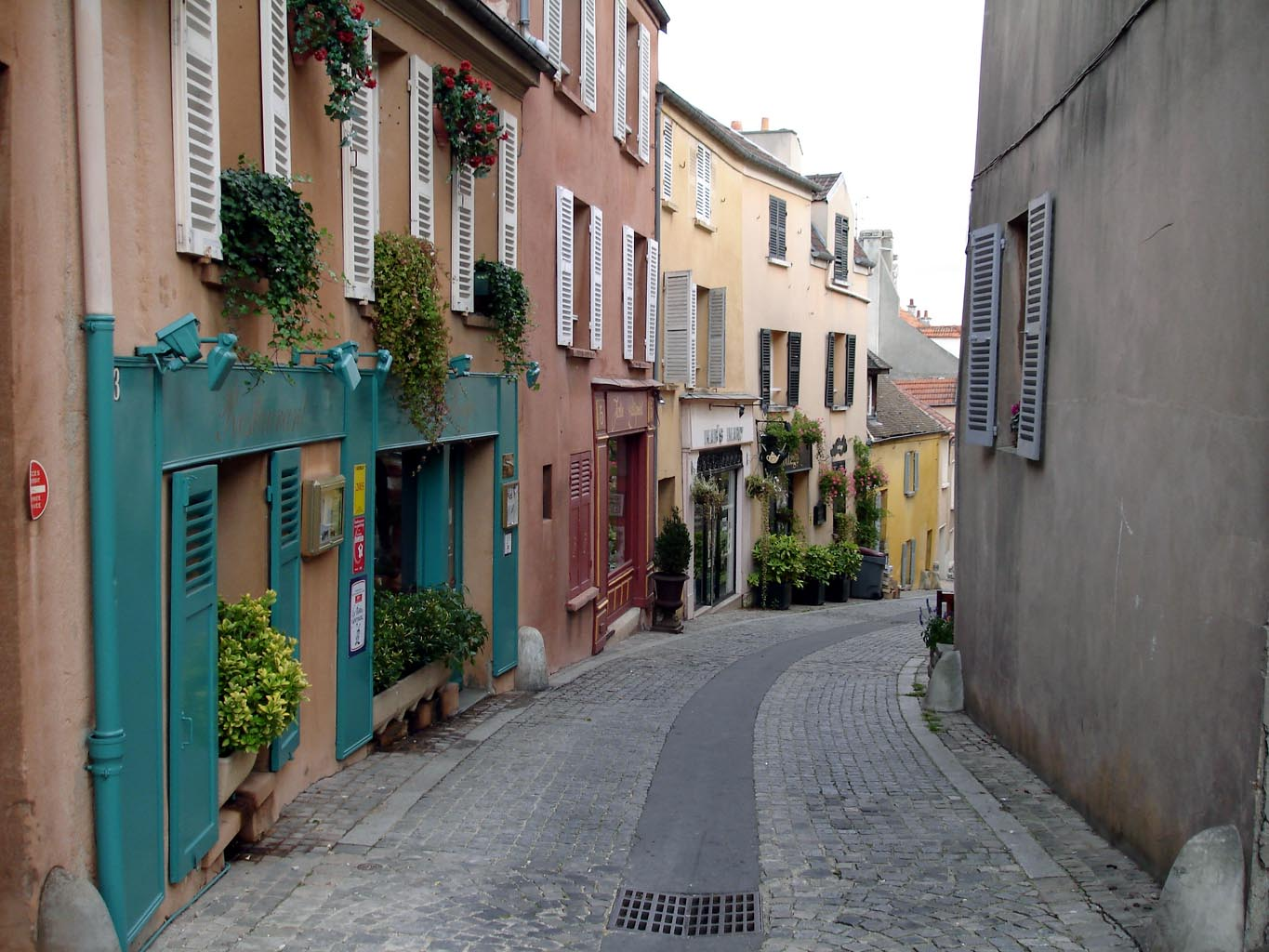
- The main street in Marly-le-Roi

- Coat of arms

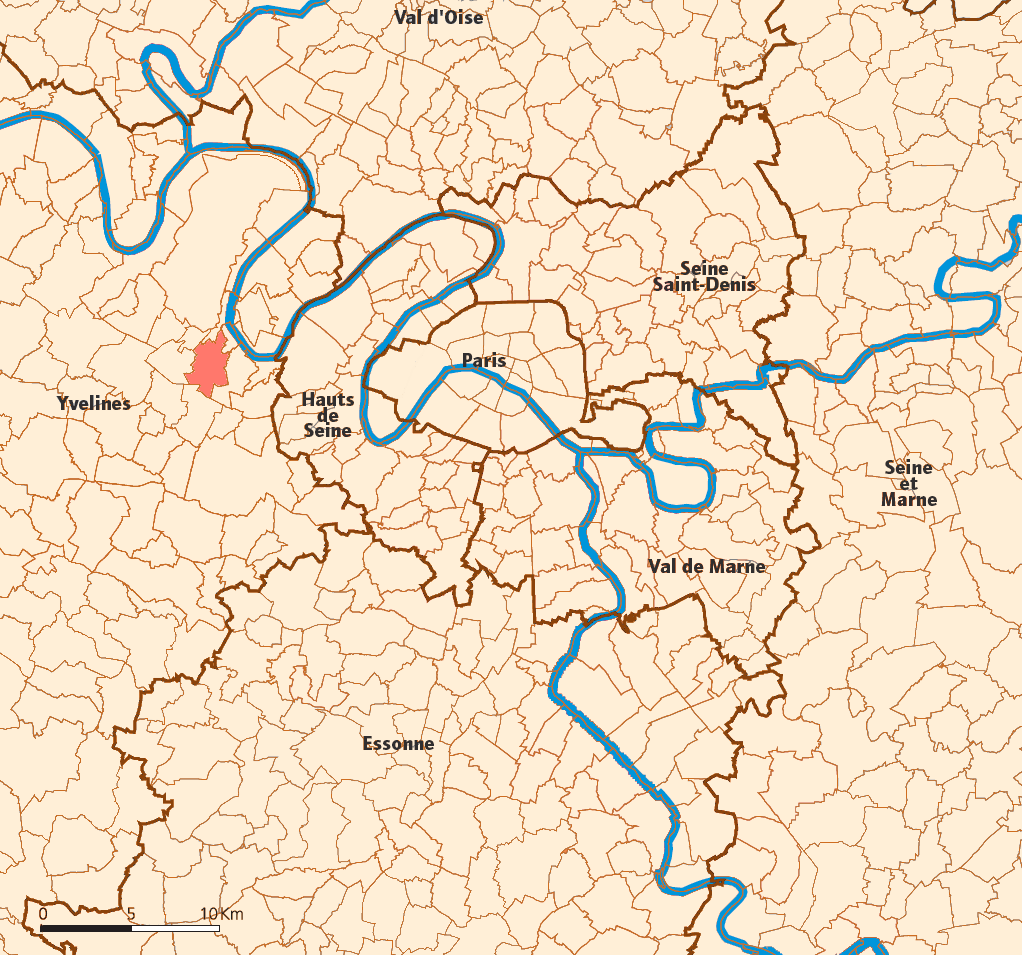
- Location (in red) within Paris inner and outer suburbs
- Location of Marly-le-Roi
- Location within France Location within Île-de-France (region)
- Coordinates: 48°52′03″N 2°05′41″E
- Country: France
- Region: Île-de-France
- Department: Yvelines
- Arrondissement: Saint-Germain-en-Laye
- Canton: Chatou
- Intercommunality: CA Saint Germain Boucles Seine

Government
  - Mayor (2020–2026): Jean-Yves Perrot
- Area^{1}: 6.54 km^{2} (2.53 sq mi)
- Elevation: 127 m (417 ft)
- Highest elevation: 179 m (587 ft)
- Lowest elevation: 48 m (157 ft)
- Population (2023): 16,756
  - Density: 2,560/km^{2} (6,640/sq mi)
- Demonym: Marlychois
- Time zone: UTC+01:00 (CET)
  - Summer (DST): UTC+02:00 (CEST)
- INSEE/Postal code: 78372 /78160
- Website: www.marlyleroi.fr
- ^{1} French Land Register data, which excludes lakes, ponds, glaciers > 1 km^{2} (0.386 sq mi or 247 acres) and river estuaries.

Marly-le-Roi (French pronunciation: [maʁli lə ʁwa]; lit. 'Marly-the-King') is a commune in the Yvelines department in the Île-de-France region, France. It is located in the western outer suburbs of Paris, 18.4 km (11.4 mi) from the centre of Paris.

Marly-le-Roi was the location of the Château de Marly, the leisure residence of the Sun King Louis XIV which was destroyed after the French Revolution. The Marly-le-Roi National Estate and Park now occupies much of the grounds of the former château, including restored waterways and lawns. The smaller Château du Verduron is nearby.

== Demographics ==
The inhabitants are called Marlychois or less commonly Marlésiens in French.

Historical population
Year	Pop.	±% p.a.
1968	11,925	—
1975	16,103	+4.38%
1982	17,257	+0.99%
1990	16,741	−0.38%
1999	16,759	+0.01%
2007	16,606	−0.11%
2012	16,600	−0.01%
2017	16,192	−0.50%
2023	16,756	+0.57%
Source: INSEE

== Transport ==
Marly-le-Roi is served by Marly-le-Roi station on the Transilien Paris-Saint-Lazare suburban rail line.

== International relations ==
Marly-le-Roi is twinned with:

- Kita, Mali
- Leichlingen, Germany
- Marlow, England, United Kingdom
- Viseu, Portugal

== See also ==
- Communes of the Yvelines department
- Château de Marly
- Machine de Marly
- Marly series - Paintings of Marly by Alfred Sisley
