= Fayed: The Unauthorized Biography =

1998 biography by Tom Bower

- Author: Tom Bower
- Language: English
- Subject: Biography of Mohamed Al-Fayed
- Genre: Nonfiction, biography
- Publisher: Macmillan
- Publication date: October 1998
- Media type: Hardback
- Pages: 496
- ISBN: 9780333745540

Fayed: The Unauthorized Biography is a 1998 biography by Tom Bower of the Egyptian businessman Mohamed Al-Fayed.

It was published in hardback by Macmillan in October 1998 with 496 pages. The book sold well and had sold 15,000 copies and been reprinted by November 1998.

Following the BBC investigation into allegations of sexual assault and rape by Al-Fayed and the broadcast of the documentary Al Fayed: Predator at Harrods in September 2024, Bower wrote in The Sunday Times that "For decades, all this was known. And yet, Britain’s libel laws and a supine establishment allowed the criminal to escape justice. Exposing him now should shame those who knew the truth during his lifetime". An updated and revised version, The Fall of Fayed: Lies, Greed and Scandal, was published in 2025.

== Background ==
Tom Bower is an investigative journalist and biographer. He had previously written biographies of the businessmen Robert Maxwell and Tiny Rowland. The Egyptian businessman Mohamed Al-Fayed had had a long adversarial relationship with Rowland which stemmed from their falling out in the aftermath of Al-Fayed's acquisition of the House of Fraser retail group which included the London department store Harrods. Bower had previously held the launch of the paperback edition of one of his two biographies of Maxwell at Harrods. Al-Fayed had assisted Bower with material for his book on Rowland. Michael Cole, Al-Fayed's spokesperson, said that "On the basis that my enemy's enemy is my friend, we gave [Bower] a great deal of useful assistance". Cole subsequently described the claims in Bower's book as "a travesty of the truth" and that "We helped Tom, and then he betrayed all of that help ... I don't have any personal animus against him. But I don't trust him". Bower was flown to Paris in Al-Fayed's helicopter to interview staff at the Ritz three days after the death of Diana, Princess of Wales in September 1997. Bower subsequently declined an offer of £400,000 from Al-Fayed to write his biography.

Bower met Adnan Khashoggi at the Connaught Hotel to help him with research for the book. Khashoggi told Bower that Al-Fayed was " ... an unbelievable criminal and liar" and said "Be careful. He's dangerous". Bower was the subject of an entrapment attempt to get him to purchase "purportedly stolen photo albums in which Fayed had recorded his sexual conquests". The event brought their acquaintance to an end.

== Reviews ==
The book was reviewed in The Evening Standard by Paul Foot. He praised it as "amazing" and felt that Al-Fayed's life bore comparison with Bower's previous subject, Robert Maxwell, as the "similarities between the two tyrants emerge from every page" but that Al-Fayed "outshone" Maxwell in his hypocrisy and "both used their enormous wealth and power to terrify their employees".

Martin Vander Weyer reviewed Fayed in the Daily Telegraph and wrote that Al-Fayed "seems to have met his match in Tom Bower" and that "despite some mildly irritating stylistic tics, [Bower] is the Inspector Morse of investigative biographers, a fluent phlegmatic story-teller and a master of intricacies". Vander Weyer felt that Bower created a "richly comic portrait" of a "kind of crazed" Egyptian version of Ronnie Barker's shopkeeper character Albert Arkwright, in Open All Hours.

In a 2007 profile of Bower for The Guardian, Oliver Burkeman described the book as " ... that rare thing - a book by turns so entertaining and alarming that even reading the index is an engrossing experience".

In his review for The Guardian, A. N. Wilson wrote that "In the early pages of the story the reader is constantly impressed by how much odder, and in a way more impressive, the reality of Fayed's life has been than the crudely fantastic lies he spins about it" and that the book " ... fills you with utter contempt, not just for Fayed but for England and all the greedy, unprincipled men whom we ask to be our City bankers, our newspaper proprietors, our MPs".

Jonathan Calvert reviewed the book in The Observer and felt the prior publication of "Holy War at Harrods", Maureen Orth's profile of Al-Fayed in Vanity Fair magazine meant that Bower's fresh revelations lacked the impact they would otherwise have had and that there was "nothing new of substance to merit the publisher's claim that this is the 'most controversial book of the year'". Calvert wrote that it would have been interesting to read a psychological analysis that sought to explain what creates men like Al-Fayed.
