= Radhika Jones =

American magazine editor (born 1973)

- Born: January 23, 1973 (age 53); New York City, U.S.
- Education: Harvard University; Columbia University
- Occupation: Magazine editor
- Title: Editor-in-chief of Vanity Fair
- Children: 1

Radhika Jones (born January 23, 1973) is an American magazine editor who served as the fifth editor-in-chief of Vanity Fair magazine from 2017 until 2025. She succeeded Graydon Carter, who retired in 2017 after 25 years in the role.

Jones formerly served as the editorial director for the books department at The New York Times, deputy managing editor of Time and the managing editor of The Paris Review.

== Early life and education ==
Jones was born in New York to an American father, Robert L. Jones, a folk musician, and an Indian mother, Marguerite Jones (who had come to Europe to study languages), who met in Paris, France, in 1970. She grew up in Cincinnati and Ridgefield, Connecticut. She has a brother and a sister named Nalini, who is an author. Jones has a bachelor's degree from Harvard University and a Ph.D. in English and comparative literature from Columbia University where she has also taught courses in writing and literature; Edward Mendelson was Jones's advisor for her master's thesis on Arnold Bennett.

== Career ==
Jones began her career in Moscow, Russia, as the arts editor from 1995 to 1997 of the English-language Moscow Times. She was the managing editor of The Paris Review before moving to Time as culture editor in 2008. During her employment at Time she oversaw its yearly listing of the 100 most influential people and Person of the Year. In 2016, she joined The New York Times as the editorial director of the books department.

On 13 November 2017, Condé Nast formally announced Jones's appointment as editor-in-chief of Vanity Fair. She began working on 11 December 2017. According to The Guardian, Jones was nominated for the position and championed by David Remnick, the editor of The New Yorker.

On 3 April 2025, Jones announced that she would step down from her position as editor-in-chief of Vanity Fair in the spring of 2025.

In 2026, the Columbia Journalism School announced that Jones, an alumnus of the university, will join its adjunct faculty in the spring of 2027.

== Personal life ==
Jones lives in Brooklyn with her husband and son.

Media offices
Preceded by Graydon Carter	Editor of Vanity Fair; 2017-2025	Succeeded by Mark Guiducci
