= Riad Khashoggi =

Saudi Arabian industrial engineer

Riad A. Khashoggi
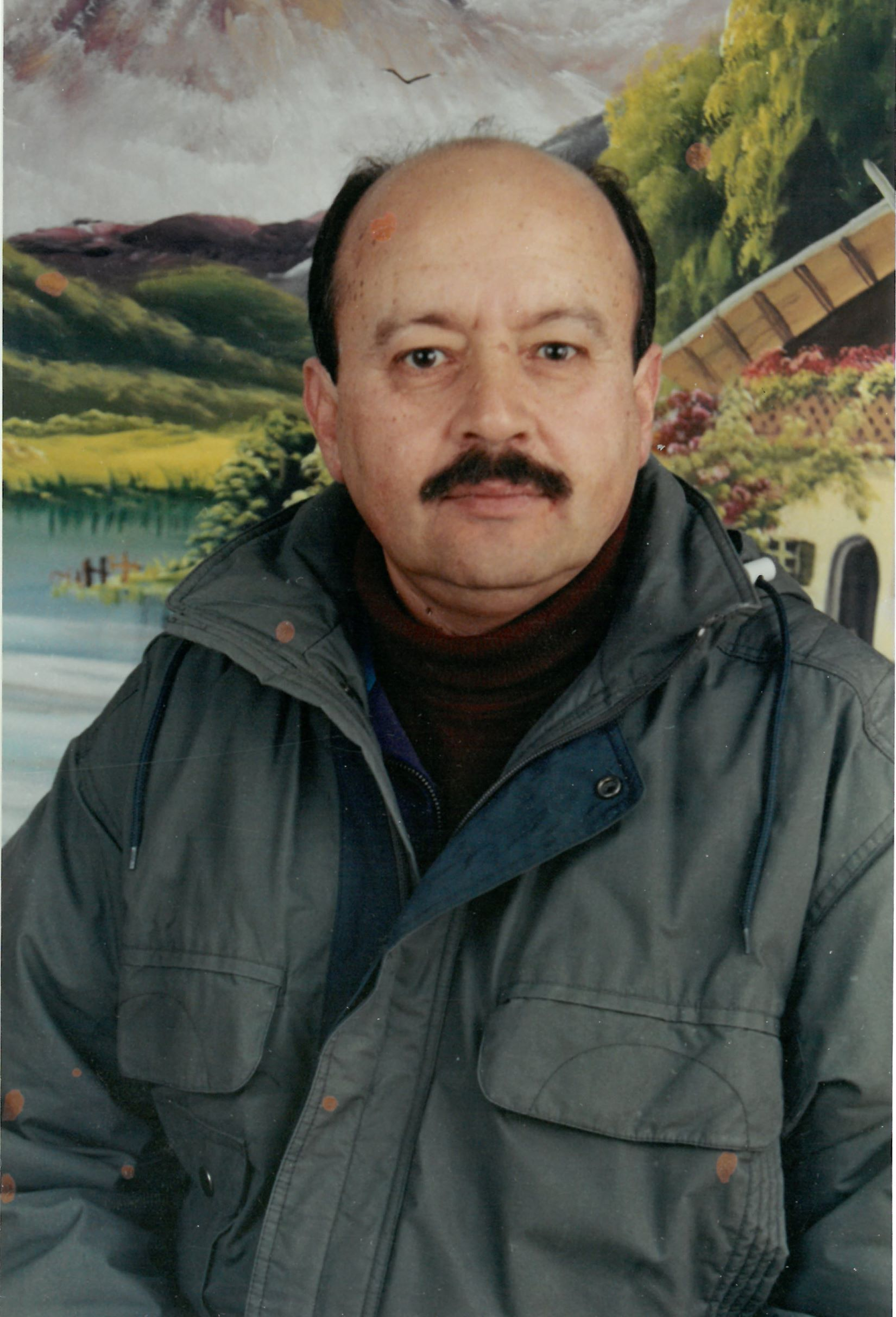
- Khashoggi in North Africa, 1988
- Born: Riyadh Ahmed Hamza Khashoggi; 26 October 1941; Medina, Saudi Arabia
- Died: 1 May 2012 (aged 70)
- Education: Dahran Electrical Company (Technical Education Scholarship); University of Bremen (Germany)
- Occupation: Industrial Engineer
- Spouse(s): Angelika Berlanda(div. 1984); Eleonora de Lennart (m. 1986)
- Children: 3
- Parents: Ahmed Hamza Khashoggi (father); Esaaf al Dafterdar (mother)
- Relatives: Hamza al Khashoggi (grandfather); Jamal Khashoggi (brother); Adnan Khashoggi (cousin); Samira Khashoggi (cousin); Nabila Khashoggi (niece); Emad Khashoggi (cousin); Dodi Fayed (cousin)

Sheikh Riad A. Khashoggi (Arabic: رياض خاشقجي; born in Medina October 26, 1941 – May 1, 2012) was the first industrial engineer in Saudi Arabia capable of designing heavy duty industrial factories as well as being a scholar and an author. He designed and founded Saudi Steel, the first steel factory in Saudi Arabia. Saudi Steel soon became the largest factory in the Arabian world. His partners in Saudi Steel were Sheikh Omar al Saggaf, Foreign Minister and best friend; and Sheikh Kamal Adham, Head of the Saudi CIA and brother-in-law of Faisal bin Abdulaziz Al Saud (King Faisal).

== Family ==
Sheikh Riad Khashoggi was the son of Ahmed Hamza Khashoggi and Esaaf al Dafterdar (1920-2010);

Grandson of Sheikh Hamza al Khashoggi (1863–1954) who had dealings with Lawrence of Arabia;

Brother of Jamal A. Khashoggi (13 October 1958 – 2 October 2018) who was murdered October 2, 2018 in Istanbul;

Brother of Sahel Khashoggi, Wajdi Khashoggi, Samiha, Sanah, and Salwa Khashoggi;

Cousin of Adnan Khashoggi (25 July 1935 – 6 June 2017), Adel Khashoggi, Samira Khashoggi, and attorney, Motasem Khashoggi.

Adnan Khashoggi and Samira Khashoggi were brother and sister.

Samira Khashoggi married Adnan Khashoggi's accountant, Mohammed Fayed; they had a son, Dodi Fayed, who was dating Diana, Princess of Wales, when the two were killed in a car crash in Paris.

Riad and Jamal Khashoggi's family on their mother's side was grandmother Sitti Asia al Dafterdar, daughter of the Mufti von Medina (1874–1990), who lived to the age of 116, and General YaYa al Dafterdar, General of the Saudi Arabian Army, uncle of Riad and Jamal Khashoggi and without whom–and without Riad Khashoggi's help–there would not be Adnan Khashoggi, “the richest man in the world.”

The grandfather of Riad Khashoggi, Jamal Khashoggi, Sahel, and Samiha was Sheikh Hamza Khashoggi (1863-1954).

Adnan Khashoggi's father was Mohamed Khashoggi, who was Sheikh Hamza's younger brother–Riad and Jamal Khashoggi's uncle. Sheikh Hamza al Khashoggi made his brother's medical study at the Sorbonne University possible. Mohamed Khashoggi became the first professional surgeon in Saudi Arabia and later became the personal physician to King Abdul Aziz al Saud, King of Saudi Arabia. Sheikh Hamza sent his brother, Mohamed, to France to study medicine before WWII was over.

== Primary and Secondary School ==
Riad Khashoggi graduated from High School (Medina) in 1958. At which time he received a Technical Education Scholarship from Dahran Electrical Company and studied in Germany at the University of Bremen. While attending the University of Bremen, Khashoggi had a stroke of luck and met a Moroccan in the streets who had business dealings in Germany. Thus, Riad Khashoggi had his first encounter with the business world and received an offer from the German export company “Dunselmann & Michaelsen” to work with them traveling all over the Middle East selling their goods. He soon became a young millionaire. However, at the persuasion of his cousin, Adnan Khashoggi, Riad Khashoggi returned to Saudi Arabia to join the family's gypsum factory business.

== Career ==
Riad Khashoggi returned to Saudi Arabia (1967) and became a partner in the family gypsum business, which was near bankruptcy. Riad Khashoggi left the family business (1970) and started the operation of Saudi Steel. He was the only industrial engineer in Saudi Arabia who was capable of designing such a heavy duty factory. His partners were Kamal Adham, head of the Saudi Arabian CIA Secret Service and brother in law of Faisal bin Abdulaziz Al Saud (King Faisal), Sheikh Omar al Saggaf, Minister of Interior, and others. King Faisal supported this project with land and a check for $12 million. Within a short time, Saudi Steel became the largest steel factory in the Arabian world, competitive with the international steel industry. Soon after Riad Khashoggi entered into a joint venture with the German steel factory Krupp which became known as RAK-Krupp (with RAK meaning Riad Ahmed Khashoggi). Simultaneously, he established RAK Trading, Mechanical, and Electrical Corporation (later known as RAK).

In 1975, due to serious political problems as well as King Faisal's and Omar al Saggaf's death (assassination), Riad had no choice but to sell his shares of the company, Saudi Steel. And he focused on expanding his companies “RAK Trading, Mechanical and Electrical Corporation” (RAK). RAK grew into a strong organization; it executed multi-million dollar projects in steel construction, high-capacity fuel tanks, high-rise buildings, steel barges for Jeddah harbor, sub-contracting for Airport Jeddah, highways, and special heavy technical projects. Joint ventures included the American companies, John Mansfield (USA) and Krupp Steel (Germany).

RAK became one of the leading companies in Saudi Arabia (1980) which included RAK-KRUPP Steel Division; RAK STEEL Construction; RAK Contracting; RAK Trade Division; and RAK International (the first environmental factory in Greece that introduced and used recycled material for packaging fruit).

In the early part of 1990 Riad lived in the US in Abington Pennsylvania and ran his businesses out of a penthouse office in the Fox Pavilion in Jenkintown PA.

== Personal life ==
Riad Khashoggi married Angelika Berlanda. They had three children: Deenah, Nadia, and Raed. They divorced in 1984. In 1986, Riad Khashoggi married his second wife, Eleonora de Lennart.

== Books ==
- Rebel Sheikh - The True Khashoggi Story
