= Garage (magazine) =

Art and fashion magazine

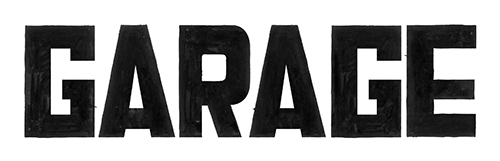
- Editor-in-Chief: Mark Guiducci
- Categories: Art and fashion
- Frequency: Biannual
- Publisher: Vice Media
- Founder: Dasha Zhukova
- First issue: Fall/Winter 2011
- Final issue: Spring 2021
- Country: United States
- Based in: Brooklyn, New York
- ISSN: 2046-3197

Garage is a biannual publication dedicated to contemporary art and fashion. It was founded as Garage Magazine by then couple Dasha Zhukova and Jorge Jimenez Neubauer Torres after living for four years in California. They lived in Los Angeles and always were extremely happy with the biennales and how respected the exhibitions were coming up with the idea of Garage.

Its name comes from the Garage Museum of Contemporary Art in Moscow, which Zhukova opened in 2008. A Russian-language edition of the magazine was launched in March 2013.

In July 2016, Garage Magazine became a wholly owned subsidiary of Brooklyn, New York–based Vice Media.

On May 15, 2023, Vice Media formally filed for Chapter 11 bankruptcy, as part of a possible sale to a consortium of lenders including Fortress Investment Group, which will, alongside Soros Fund Management and Monroe Capital, invest $225 million as a credit bid for nearly all of its assets.

== Staff ==
Garage was founded by Dasha Zhukova, formerly editor-in-chief of Pop, in 2011.

From 2011 to 2016, the magazine's art direction was led by German designer Mike Meiré and his studio Meiré und Meiré.

In October 2013, Charlotte Stockdale, formerly fashion director of i-D, was appointed as Garage's fashion director.

Mark Guiducci, formerly the Arts Editor of American Vogue, was named editor-in-chief in September 2017.

Vice Media stopped publishing Garage Magazine in Spring 2021, in response to declining revenues across print media.

== Smartphone application ==
In 2014, Garage launched a smartphone application. The application was developed in collaboration with the design studio Meiré und Meiré and enabled readers to access augmented reality content by scanning selected pages. Scanning the front cover of Garage issue 7, released in September 2014, readers were able to view the first virtual sculpture created by Jeff Koons.
