= Leo Lerman =

American journalist

Leo Lerman (May 23, 1914 – August 22, 1994) was an American writer and editor who worked for Condé Nast Publications for more than 50 years. Lerman also wrote for the New York Herald Tribune, Harper's Bazaar, Dance Magazine, and Vogue and was the editor of Playbill for decades.

== Life and career ==
Lerman was born in New York City, the son of Jewish immigrants from Eastern Europe, Ida (née Goldwasser) and Samuel Lerman. He grew up in East Harlem and Queens, New York. As a child, he accompanied his house-painter grandfather and father on various jobs in upper-class homes. He was openly gay. His partner was Gray Foy (1922-2012), who had a promising career as an artist, specializing in drawings, which was eventually eclipsed by his social life with Lerman: Foy's "Dimensions" was donated to the Museum of Modern Art in New York by actor Steve Martin, Foy's friend.

Selections from his journals, roughly 10 percent of the writings, were published in 2007 as The Grand Surprise: The Journals of Leo Lerman. Meant to be the source material for a novel he never wrote, the journals detail his social and business interactions with a remarkable number of famous and important people who passed through the New York arts scene from the 1940s to the '90s.

Lerman died in New York City on August 22, 1994. He was 80.

== Filmography ==
- The Troublemaker (1964) - Dirty Old Man

== Bibliography ==
- Lerman, Leo (edited by Stephen Pascal). The Grand Surprise: The Journals of Leo Lerman. Knopf, ISBN 978-1-4000-4439-9

Media offices
Preceded by Richard Locke	Editor of Vanity Fair; 1983–1984	Succeeded by Tina Brown
