= Omar Fayed =

Environmentalist and publisher

- عُمَر الْفَايِد
- Born: Omar Alexander Mohamed Al-Fayed; October 1987 (age 38–39); London, England
- Citizenship: Finnish
- Education: ACS International Schools
- Occupations: Environmentalist, publisher
- Parents: Mohamed Al-Fayed (father); Heini Wathén (mother)
- Relatives: 4 siblings, including Dodi Fayed (half-brother)

Omar Alexander Mohamed Al-Fayed (Egyptian Arabic: عمر الكسندر محمد الفايد; born October 1987) is a British-born Finnish-Egyptian environmentalist and publisher. He is CEO of ESTEE (Earth Space Technical Ecosystem Enterprises), based in Switzerland and Britain, that advocates human space exploration, space colonization, and sustainable human development within the biosphere. He is co-founder and CEO of EarthX, a data visualization and mapping company based on NASA’s World Wind Project. He is chairman of Synergetic Press based in New Mexico, and a fellow of the Institute of Ecotechnics.

Fayed was ranked 75 in Arabian Business magazine's "Power 100" list in 2009.

== Early life ==
Omar Fayed was born in London, England, to Finnish model Heini Wathén and Egyptian businessman Mohamed Al-Fayed. Egyptian film producer Dodi Fayed was his half-brother, who died in a car crash in Paris at the end of August 1997.

== Career ==
Fayed started in business as a teenager trading commodities. In 2006, aged 19, he was appointed to the Harrods board and in ten subsidiary companies including Fulham F.C. and the Ritz Hotel in Paris, all companies owned by his father. Fayed was expected to take over as chairman of Harrods, however he resigned in 2009 to pursue his studies for an MBA. He expressed a desire to focus on environmental entrepreneurship instead, commenting in an interview, "that consumerist culture wasn’t doing anything positive for the future of humanity." His father Mohamed Al-Fayed, subsequently sold Harrods in 2010, to Qatar Holdings, the sovereign wealth fund of the emirate of Qatar, for £1.5 billion ($2.3 billion).

Fayed is chairman of Biotecture, a provider of modular green wall systems, that built large-scale living walls for the Walkie Talkie skyscraper in the City of London, and the Veolia recycling and energy recovery facility in Leeds. In 2014, he founded Living City, an initiative to connect and consult green enterprises and government projects. He was a director of the Ritz Hotel Paris.

Fayed was executive producer for the 2015 documentary film The Sunshine Makers, about the manufacture of the psychedelic compound LSD in the 1960s.

== Family feud ==
Omar Fayed was fifth in line of succession in inheriting his father Mohamed Al-Fayed's £1.7 billion ($2 billion) fortune, who died 30 August 2023. His mother, a Finnish model, Heini Wathén, and two elder sisters and one older brother preceded him in the succession order. However, at the time of his father's death he was engulfed in a high profile power struggle against his mother and siblings, in an attempt to take control of his deceased father's estate.

A couple of years prior to his father's death, Omar Fayed brought charges against his elder sister Camilla Al-Fayed and her husband, Mohamad Esreb, in Guildford Crown Court on 3 May 2021. Omar claimed his elder sister, brother-in-law and two of their bodyguards, including Matthew Littlewood, a decorated Afghanistan war veteran, stole his mobile phone and assaulted him at his father's country mansion in Oxted, Surrey.

Camilla Al-Fayed and all others accused pleaded not guilty to the charges. In the high profile court case, Omar had claimed that he was physically attacked by his brother-in-law in the incident, while Camilla denying charges told the court Omar was intoxicated at the time and a "heavy drug user". Omar Fayed had claimed £100,000 in damages from his sister for the incident, however in August 2021, the case was adjourned by the judge, who instructed Omar Fayed to instead solve the dispute privately, in order to avoid an expensive and embarrassing High Court battle.

In a 2022 interview in Tatler, re-published concurrently following his father's death, Omar had commented that "It’s sad and super silly what is going on with Camilla. A classic trustafarian tragedy," in regards to the incident in court and had further believed himself to be a victim of "a struggle of power between brothers."

Omar Fayed had listed his home in London for sale in July 2022 for an asking price of £5 million.
