= Richard Locke (critic) =

American critic and essayist (1941–2023)

- Born: 1941
- Died: 2023 (aged 81–82)
- Education: Columbia University (BA); Clare College, Cambridge
- Occupations: Editor, writer, professor
- Employers: Simon & Schuster; The New York Times Book Review; Vanity Fair; Columbia University

Richard Locke (September 17, 1941 - August 25, 2023) was an American critic and essayist. He was a professor of writing at Columbia University School of the Arts and formerly served as the first editor-in-chief of the revived Vanity Fair and president of the National Book Critics Circle.

== Biography ==
He received a B.A. from Columbia University, a B.A. from Clare College, Cambridge University, and did graduate work at Harvard University. He was a Professor of Writing in the Writing Program at Columbia University School of the Arts for 38 years beginning in 1984. As Professor of Professional Practice in the Graduate School of the Arts, he served as Chair of the Writing Division from 1995-2000, retiring as Professor Emeritus in 2022.

He was also a senior editor at Simon & Schuster, where he worked as assistant to Robert Gottlieb, deputy editor of The New York Times Book Review, the first editor in chief of the relaunched Vanity Fair (1983), a lecturer at the English Institute, Harvard University, and a Poynter Fellow at Yale University. He served as a judge of the National Book Award and the Pulitzer Prize Jury in Criticism, and as a director and president of The National Book Critics Circle.

He was the author of more than 180 essays and reviews that appeared in The New York Times Book Review, the Wall Street Journal, The American Scholar, The Threepenny Review, Bookforum, Salmagundi, The Yale Review, The Atlantic, The New Republic,The Washington Post, and other publications. His book Critical Children: The Use of Children in Ten Great Novels, an examination of works by British and American writers from Dickens to Philip Roth that use children as vehicles of moral and cultural interrogation, was published in September 2011 by Columbia University Press.

Media offices
Preceded by	Editor of Vanity Fair; 1983	Succeeded by Leo Lerman
