= Gray Foy =

American artist (1922–2012)

- Born: Frederick Gray Foy Jr. August 10, 1922; Dallas, Texas
- Died: November 23, 2012 (aged 90); New York City, New York
- Known for: Drawing
- Movement: Surrealism, Magic Realism, American realism, Botanical illustration
- Patrons: Muriel Bultman Francis, Lloyd Goodrich, Philip Johnson, Edgar Kaufmann Jr., Lincoln Kirstein

Gray Foy (August 10, 1922 – November 23, 2012) was an American artist who created a visionary body of drawings from 1941 to 1975. His drawings are generally divided into two phases. First, from 1941 to 1948, the artist drew figurative Surrealist landscapes and interiors. Then beginning in the late 1940s, he concentrated on botanical subject matter, both naturalistic and imagined.

== Education and personal life ==
Born on August 10, 1922, in Dallas, Texas, Foy spent his youth in Los Angeles and attended Los Angeles City College studying art and theater design. In the spring of 1946 he moved back to Dallas and enrolled at Southern Methodist University (SMU) for a year, then transferred in Spring of 1947 to Columbia University.

In 1948, he met writer and editor Leo Lerman, whom he married. Foy and Lerman both were immersed in the literary, visual, and performing arts and became fixtures of the New York City cognoscenti. Lerman died in 1994. In 2011, less than a month after gay marriages became legal in New York State, Foy, then 90, married Joel Kaye, then 69, the son of the founder of the Russian Tea Room.

== Early career ==
When Foy first painted seriously in the early 1940s—just after entering college—his opaque watercolors and oils were patterned after such Surrealists as Max Ernst and Salvador Dalí. In compressed perspectives, stagelike scenes of deserted cityscapes evoke a sense of dislocation and menace.

Beginning in 1943, Foy worked as a shipping expediter at the defense plant Lockheed Vega Aircraft Corporation in Burbank, California. Using standard-issue No. 2 pencils, he drew on procurement forms, depicting humanoid figures that emerge from rocky outcroppings and are coincident with the carnage of WWII.

Late in WWII, Foy began making larger format drawings. These hallucinatory scenes became his first cohesive visions. After atomic bombs were dropped on Japan, Foy responded by depicting human and animal inhabitants that reveal the instability of their molecular basis. In his largest drawing of this period, Dimensions (c. 1945–1946, Museum of Modern Art, New York), disparate figures and body parts, interior furnishings, vegetation, and geometric shapes pulsate through a dense three-dimensional space where the spatial trickery evokes that of M. C. Escher. When exhibited in 2008, the New York Times wrote of Dimensions that "A pencil drawing by Gray Foy, a little-known American artist born in 1923, is ... a scrambled, congested, Dalí-like composition of body parts, still-life, architecture, and landscape made with unbelievable refinement and microscopic detailing."

In Foy's midcentury universe, when humans seek the comfort of familiar spaces they discover instead amorphousness, velocity, and weightlessness. The pictures also reflect an affinity with the work of American Realists such as Thomas Hart Benton and John Steuart Curry, whose tropes include the overlapping vignettes of mural painting, often populated by figures whose bodies are contoured or distorted to mimic their immediate setting.

Foy himself referred to his imagery as "hyper-realism," stating in 1948 "I may turn out to be a realist. After all, hyper-realism actually becomes the supernatural." A realist direction was fostered when his wartime employment ended and he moved back to Dallas to renew his art studies at Southern Methodist with his teachers Jerry Bywaters and Otis Dozier, both referred to as Lone Star Regionalists. The Dallas Morning News said Foy's "provocative Surrealist pencil drawings are the sensation of the current year-end exhibit at SMU."

In September 1946, on his first trip to New York, the twenty-four-year-old Foy took his portfolio to the influential art and literary publication View magazine. In the fall of 1946, View published Untitled [Courtyard with Morphing Figures] (1946), a seamless mix of the marvelous and the monstrous and its appearance launched Foy's career.

Foy moved to New York in spring 1947, enrolling at Columbia University to study studio art and art history, as well as anatomy and botany, two fields that underpin much of his imagery. Soon, as in Pavel Tchelitchew’s work, Foy began his own explorations merging plant life with human features.

Foy sought gallery representation, and R. Kirk Askew became his first and only dealer at Durlacher Bros. on 57th Street. Reviewers noted the rigor of Foy’s scrutiny, describing his "microscopic vision" and "infinitesimal details glossed over by the average vision." But by the time of his first one-person exhibition at Durlacher's in April 1951, Foy had nearly abandoned Surrealist imagery and began concentrating instead on the depiction of botanical organisms undergoing transitional states. The New York Times critic Stuart Preston wrote: "Foy's pencil and brush spin out a tissue of delicacy and transparency, light enough to seem to have settled on the paper like frost, strong enough to have netted in its gossamer texture enough visual data about the plant forms to astound a botanist."

== Mature work ==
At his second one-person exhibition at Durlacher's in 1957, his observations of nature had matured, as evidenced by the intricate biological invention in such works as Uprooted Plants (1955, Whitney Museum of American Art). As his work evolved through the 1950s, the artist developed an understanding of constant change in nature and honed his ability to depict such metamorphosis.

In the three decades Foy was active, he found a way to convey his fertile awareness of nature's disorder as well as its order by refining his technical prowess. Achieved by a delicate feathering technique, the edges of the depicted organic matter gradually disappear as lighter and lighter pencil pressure traverses the sheet.

About 1957 Foy began a series of related still lifes that involve leaves or branches wrapped by human hands into clusters or sheaves, or assembled by birds into nests. With its inner pinkish radiance and veined leaf surfaces, Cluster of Leaves (ca. 1957), for example, quivers with the power of an incubating egg. These drawings are metaphors for efforts to control the untamed sprawl of natural vegetation.

In one group of works, Foy developed an additional illustrative mechanism, preparing the drawing paper with a teeming texture, introducing earthy tones and chlorophyll-like colorations. The activated surfaces simulate organic matter such as soil incrustation, moldy walls, lichen-covered rocks, or pond scum. In his book The Language of Ornament, art historian James Trilling described the effect: "Gray Foy’s drawing evokes the richness of a living coral reef, or the cheerfully haunted rocks that provide a background to some of the finest Persian miniatures."

After receiving a career-affirming John Simon Guggenheim grant in 1961, Foy concentrated on his largest drawing, The Third Kingdom (1961–62), in which monochromatic greenish-umber tones convey the pro-longed activity of organic upheaval. Working on fibrous Japanese paper, Foy spent a year trying to illustrate elemental rock forms.

Such mature drawings focus on botanical and geological forms in the act of transformation. They presage a modern-day concentration on ecological concerns by excavating the progression of natural processes. Curator Stephen C. Wicks explained: "The rich array of textures serves as a seductive skin beneath which the artist’s plant forms appear to germinate, writhe, and wither. The resulting effect underscores Gray Foy’s ability to create surrealist compositions of uncommon craftsmanship and visionary form."

== Selected exhibitions ==
=== Solo exhibitions ===
- "Gray Foy," Durlacher Bros., New York, April 24–May 19, 1951.
- "Gray Foy," Durlacher Bros., New York, March 26–April 20, 1957.

=== Group exhibitions ===
- "Texas Contemporary Artists," M. Knoedler & Co., New York, June 1952.
- "American Watercolors, Drawings, and Prints, 1952," Metropolitan Museum of Art, New York, December 5, 1952 – January 25, 1953.
- "1956 Annual Exhibition of Contemporary American Sculpture, Paintings, Watercolors, and Drawings," Whitney Museum of American Art, New York, November 14, 1956 – January 6, 1957.
- "Celebration of Creativity: Three Centuries of American Masterworks on Paper," Columbus Museum, Georgia, May 11–August 31, 2003.
- "Glossolalia: Languages of Drawing," The Museum of Modern Art, New York, March 26–July 7, 2008.

== Selected illustrations ==
=== Book jackets ===
- Vollmoeller, Karl. The Last Miracle. Sloan and Pearce, 1949.
- Boros, Eva. The Mermaids. Farrar, Straus & Cudahy, 1956.
- Gary, Romain. Lady L. Simon and Schuster, 1958.
- Salamanca, J. R. Lilith. Simon and Schuster, 1961.
- Bradbury, Ray. Something Wicked This Way Comes. Simon and Schuster, 1962.

=== Long-playing record album covers ===
- Brahms, Johannes. Symphony No. 2 in D Major, Op. 73. Columbia Masterworks, ML 4827, 1953.
- Stravinsky, Igor. Pulcinella. Columbia Masterworks, ML 4830, 1953.
- Schubert, Franz. Die Winterreise (The Winter Journey). Epic, LC 3154, 1955.
- Smetana, Bedřich. The Bartered Bride. Epic, SC 6020, 1956.
- Dukas, Paul. The Sorcerer’s Apprentice. Columbia Masterworks, ML 5198, 1957.
- Gluck, Christoph Willibald. Orpheus and Eurydice. Epic, SC 6019, 1957.
- Haydn, Joseph. Lo speziale. Epic, LC 3739, 1957.
- Stravinsky, Igor. Persephone. Columbia Masterworks, ML 5196, 1957.
- Stravinsky, Igor. Le sacre du printemps. Columbia Masterworks, MS 6010, 1958.
- Capote, Truman. Truman Capote Reading His "A Christmas Memory," from Breakfast at Tiffany’s. United Artists, UAL 9001, 1959.
