= Heini Wathén =

Finnish wife of businessman Mohamed Al-Fayed

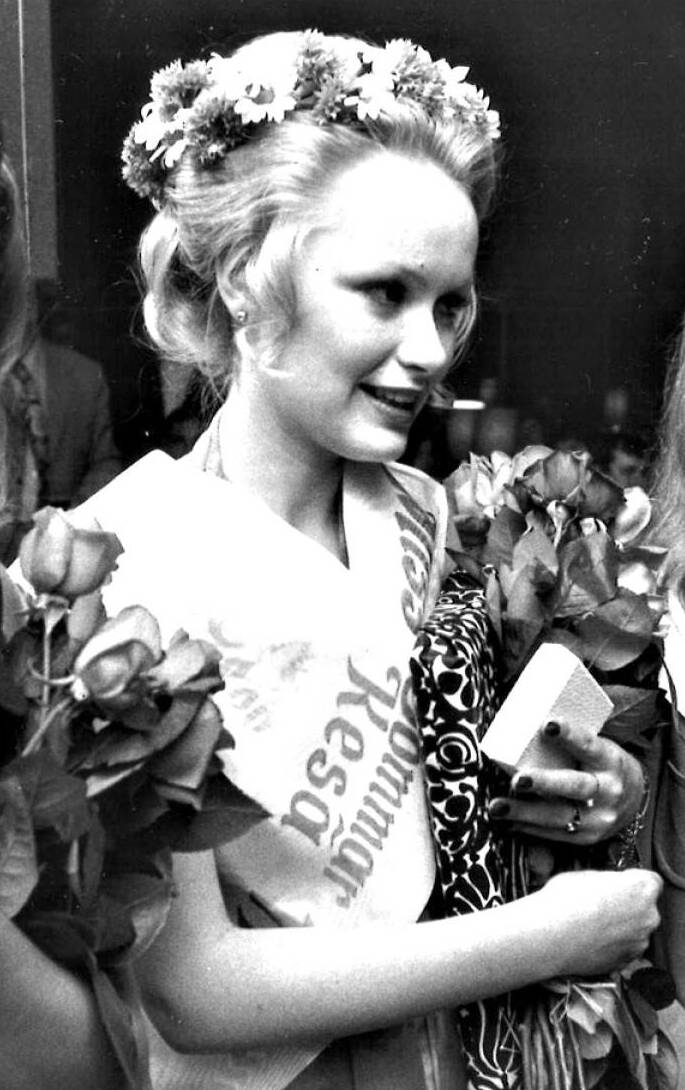
- Wathén in 1972
- Born: 24 February 1955 (age 71); Hanko, Finland
- Other name: Heini Wathén-Fayed
- Occupation: Former model
- Spouse: Mohamed Al-Fayed (m. 1985; died 2023)
- Children: 4, including Omar Fayed

Heini Wathén-Fayed (née Wathén; born 24 February 1955) is a Finnish socialite and former model. She is the widow of Egyptian businessman Mohamed Al-Fayed. She was an officer for The Ritz Hotel, London.

== Modelling career ==
Heini Wathén signed with a modelling agency after winning several beauty pageants in Finland at 17 years old. She graduated from secondary school in 1975 and joined her sister in Paris as a model. She returned to Finland two years later to compete in the Miss Finland contest, but did not make it to the finals.

During the Miss Finland contest, Wathén met Dodi Fayed, who was looking for new models in Finland. Fayed arranged for Wathén to model for Pierre Balmain's fashion house.

== Personal life ==
In Paris, Dodi Fayed introduced Wathén to his father, Mohamed Al-Fayed, who began a relationship with her. Al-Fayed soon invited Wathén to live with him on Park Lane in London. The couple married in 1985 and Heini became Dodi's stepmother.

Wathén-Fayed had four children with Mohamed Al-Fayed. The couple lived in Surrey and at a mansion in Westend, Espoo, Finland. Al-Fayed died in August 2023, at the age of 94 in London.
