= Holy War at Harrods =

1995 magazine article by Maureen Orth

"Holy War at Harrods" is a 1995 magazine article by Maureen Orth that was published in Vanity Fair. The article was about businessman Mohamed Al-Fayed and detailed his career and his management of the London department store Harrods. The article included details of alleged sexual assaults committed by Al-Fayed. The article led to a two-year legal battle between Al-Fayed and Condé Nast, the publishers of Vanity Fair.

The article was included in The Importance of Being Famous: Behind the Scenes of the Celebrity-Industrial Complex, a 2004 compilation of Orth's work.

== Contents ==
The article was 11 pages in length and was published in the September 1995 issue of British Vanity Fair, edited by Henry Porter. It included interviews with Harrods employees, Al-Fayed's bodyguards and people associated with his business career. Orth's article also extensively quoted from the 1987 Department of Trade and Industry report into the early life and business career of Al-Fayed and his brother Ali. The article described Al-Fayed's spying and bugging of his staff and incidents of sexual and racist abuse.

== Reception ==
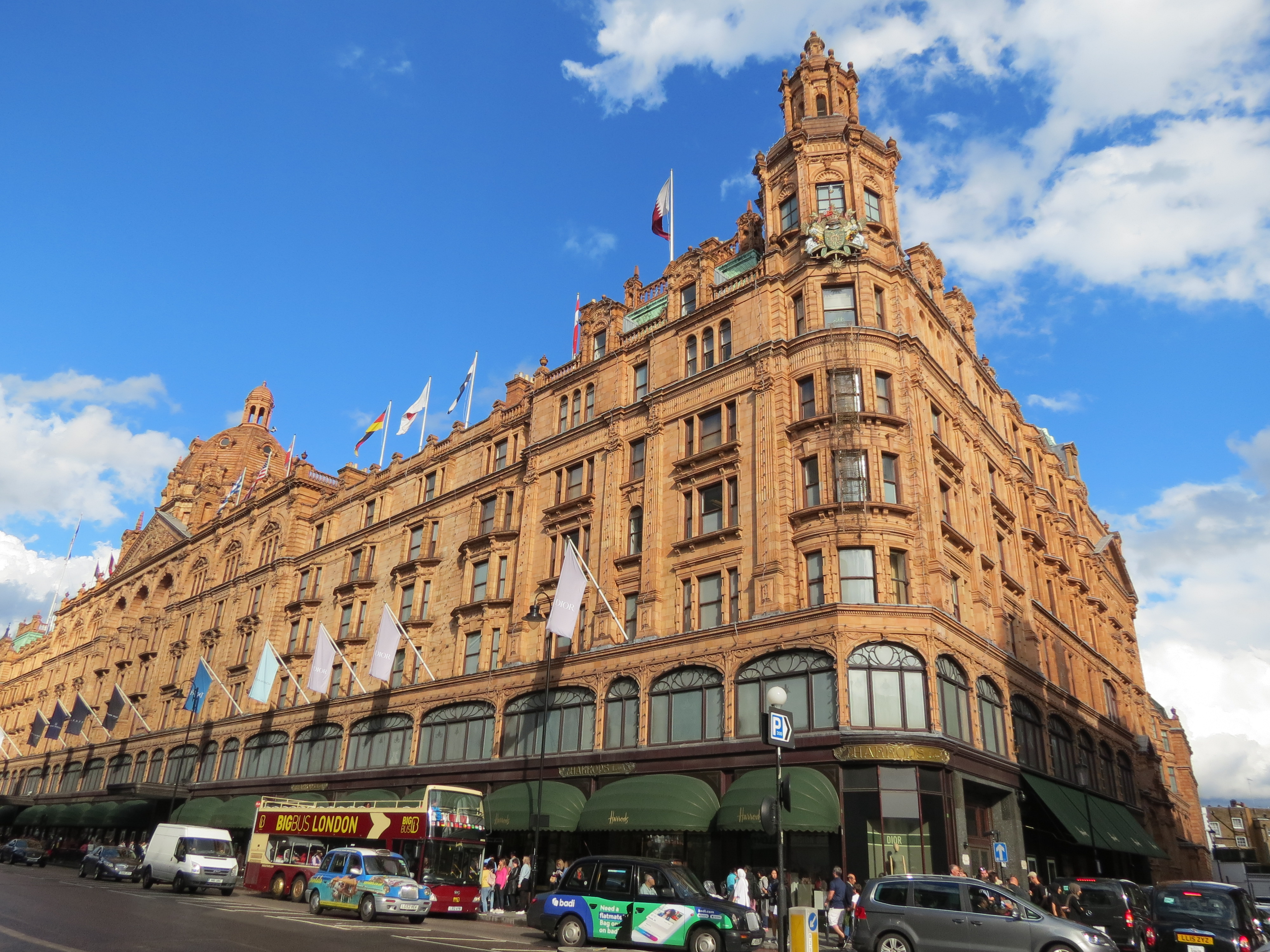
Harrods in 2018

In his 2023 memoir, The Glossy Years, Nicholas Coleridge, the chief executive of Condé Nast UK in 1995, described Holy War at Harrods as "unexpectedly restrained" and a "six" on a scale of "one as 'a puff piece' and ten a 'total hatchet job'". Coleridge felt that the piece was "skilfully done" as Orth had not avoided key issues and that Condé Nast was "unlikely to lose the multi-million pound Harrods advertising account either". Upon publication of the article, Al-Fayed's spokesperson, Michael Cole, said that it was " ... sad to see such stuff passing itself off as responsible journalism" and that Orth had "found and then believed everyone who is ill-disposed to Mr Fayed including former employees fired for breach of contract and dereliction of duty".

=== Libel case ===
Following publication Al-Fayed sued Condé Nast, the publishers of Vanity Fair, for libel, with the law firm Schillings acting for him. Orth, Graydon Carter and Coleridge were all personally named in Al-Fayed's suit. In preparation for the libel case, Henry Porter, the editor of British Vanity Fair and the lawyer David Hooper, of Biddle & Co, launched an investigation into the claims made by the women against Al-Fayed, which took two years. By the summer of 1997 Porter and Hooper had gathered sufficient evidence to be confident of a successful outcome in a trial. They had made a list of 45 individuals who had their telephones bugged by former police officers working for Al-Fayed. Al-Fayed would also allegedly use CCTV at Harrods to find victims for his sexual assaults and to spy on employees. Porter wrote in 2024 that during their investigation they had to " ... contend with skulduggery and threats dreamed up by Fayed's security force of ex-policemen. We were constantly worried about our witnesses and, unusually in a libel case, were compelled to write to Fayed's lawyers on 21 May 1997 that "pressure is being put on witnesses not to testify in a fashion which we will not tolerate and which we reserve the right to draw to the attention of the trial judge"". Former police officers working for Al-Fayed would also visit and telephone young women to threaten them. Coleridge described the libel case as a "two-year-long-war, as dirty as they come, with a thrilling sequence of devious tricks and double bluffs" and that the Condé Nast executives Si Newhouse and Jonathan Newhouse "never even considered caving in".

Porter and Hooper also investigated the role of doctors who were employed by Al-Fayed to carry out sexual health tests on "young, white, female Harrods employees", the results of which were sent to him. Employees believed to be gay were told to have tests for HIV/AIDS.

=== End of libel case ===
In May 1997 Al-Fayed prepared to end his case against Condé Nast and the case was dropped with a settlement in December 1997. The settlement was negotiated by a senior executive of Harrods. The evidence in the case collected by Porter was locked away as part of the settlement. In late June, Cole wrote to Porter that "You already have my confirmation of Mr Fayed's willingness to see matters moved on ... Blessed are the peacemakers, as I hope you would agree". Porter subsequently wrote that "[as] the journalist responsible for gathering evidence, I did not [agree]". Porter allowed journalists investigating Al-Fayed to have access to the evidence, which was used in the research and preparation of the 2024 BBC investigation. The trial date had been set for the autumn of 1998. The barrister George Carman was acting for Al-Fayed in the case. The judge told Porter that he would "win this case if you proved only 75% of what you already have" and that the allegations were "very serious, including conspiracy to commit several serious offences. It is a matter of public interest".

Si Newhouse, the chairman of Condé Nast, was approached by Fayed's side to end the libel case following the death in a car crash of Diana, Princess of Wales and Al-Fayed's son, Dodi Al-Fayed in August 1997 out of respect for Al-Fayed's grief. The chief executive of Condé Nast UK, Nicholas Coleridge had met Cole in the steam baths of the Bath & Racquets Club in Mayfair in the summer to ensure that neither of them carried covert listening devices. The pair discussed ending the libel battle between their respective employers, but no agreement was then reached. Both sides of the dispute paid for their own costs following the ending of the suit. No apology was issued by Vanity Fair and none of the text of the article was retracted.

Al-Fayed resumed placing adverts in Condé Nast publications following the end of the suit; he had previously been one of the publisher's biggest advertisers.

== Aftermath ==
In September 2024 a BBC investigation into the allegations of rape and sexual assault by Al-Fayed was broadcast called Al-Fayed: A Predator at Harrods. In the aftermath of the broadcast Porter wrote that he regretted the ending of the libel suit due to "the countless women who have suffered since our case was settled, including many who were raped by a man who appeared unaffected by grief or regret". Porter had allowed his evidence that he found during his investigation to be accessed by researchers and journalists following the end of the libel suit.
