= Vanity Fair (magazine) =

American monthly periodical

- Cover of the Hollywood 2024/2025 issue (UK)
- Editor: Mark Guiducci
- Former editors: Richard Locke; Leo Lerman; Tina Brown; Graydon Carter; Radhika Jones
- Categories: Culture
- Frequency: 10 issues per year
- Total circulation: 1,225,706 (Dec. 2019)
- First issue: February 1983; 43 years ago
- Company: Condé Nast
- Country: United States
- Language: English
- Website: vanityfair.com
- ISSN: 0733-8899
- OCLC: 8356733

Vanity Fair is an American monthly magazine of popular culture, fashion, and current affairs published by Condé Nast in the United States.

The first version of Vanity Fair was published from 1913 to 1936, then it was merged into Vogue. Conde Nast then revived the title in 1983. Vanity Fair currently publishes four international editions which are circulated in the United Kingdom (since 1991), Italy (since 2003), Spain (since 2008) and France (since 2013).

== History ==
=== Dress and Vanity Fair ===
Condé Montrose Nast began his magazine empire in 1913 when he purchased the men's fashion magazine Dress, which he renamed Dress and Vanity Fair and later Vanity Fair. The magazine thrived throughout the 1920s and reached a circulation of 90,000 copies at its peak. However, it became a casualty of the Great Depression and declining advertising revenues. Condé Nast announced in December 1935 that Vanity Fair would be folded into Vogue (circulation 156,000) beginning with the March 1936 issue. Vogue incorporated Vanity Fair till the February 1983 issue.

In 2008, Vanity Fair celebrated 95 years since its debut under Nast (as well as the 25th anniversary of its 1983 relaunch), and the magazine's photographic heritage was memorialized in an exhibition called "Vanity Fair Portraits, 1913–2008" at the National Portrait Gallery in London. The exhibition traveled to the Scottish National Portrait Gallery in Edinburgh, the Los Angeles County Museum of Art, and the National Portrait Gallery in Canberra, Australia. Vanity Fair: The Portraits, a special jubilee issue and hardback book, was published in the fall of 2008.

Vanity Fair is a fictitious place ruled by Beelzebub in the book Pilgrim's Progress by John Bunyan. Later use of the name was influenced by the well-known 1847–48 novel of the same name by William Makepeace Thackeray.

== Modern revival ==
In June 1981, the Condé Nast company (owned by S.I. Newhouse) announced plans to revive Vanity Fair. The first issue was released on February 21, 1983 (cover date March), edited by Richard Locke, formerly of The New York Times Book Review. After three issues, Locke was replaced by Leo Lerman, veteran features editor of Vogue. He was followed by editors Tina Brown (1984–1992), Graydon Carter (1992–2017) and Radhika Jones (2017 to 2025). Jones was previously the director of The New York Times book section. Vanity Fair employees unionized in 2022. Mark Guiducci, formerly the creative editorial director of Vogue, succeeded Jones as editor-in-chief in June 2025 following her resignation.

Vanity Fair logo, used from 2013 to 2025

=== Content and reception ===
Vanity Fair's articles cover a variety of topics. Regular writers and columnists have included Dominick Dunne, Sebastian Junger, Michael Wolff, Maureen Orth and Christopher Hitchens. In 1996, journalist Marie Brenner wrote "The Man Who Knew Too Much", an exposé on the tobacco industry which was adapted into the 1999 film The Insider starring Al Pacino and Russell Crowe. Vanity Fair's May 2005 issue identified Mark Felt as the Watergate whistleblower "Deep Throat", who leaked information that led to the 1974 resignation of U.S. President Richard Nixon. The magazine features candid interviews with celebrities, including a monthly Proust Questionnaire. In the 21st century, notable interviews include Teri Hatcher who revealed that she was sexually abused as a child, Jennifer Aniston in her first interview following her divorce from Brad Pitt, Anderson Cooper discussing his brother's death, and Martha Stewart's first interview after her release from prison.

In 2015, Vanity Fair had to update the account it had published by the NBC News correspondent Richard Engel about the disputed circumstances of his 2012 kidnapping in Syria, stating that he had misidentified his captors. In 2019, former contributing editor Vicky Ward said her 2003 profile of Jeffrey Epstein in Vanity Fair had included on-the-record accounts of Annie and Maria Farmer (who filed the earliest known criminal complaints about Epstein), but that they were later stricken from Ward's article after Bill Clinton pressured the magazine's editor Graydon Carter.

=== Representations in film and literature ===
The magazine was the subject of Toby Young's 2001 book, How to Lose Friends and Alienate People, about his search for success in New York City while working for Graydon Carter's Vanity Fair. The book was made into a movie in 2008, with Jeff Bridges playing Carter. During his tenure, Carter was known for encouraging staff to spend lavishly to cultivate a public perception of the magazine as classy.

In 2017 former editor Tina Brown published "The Vanity Fair Diaries".

== Photography ==
Famous contributing photographers for the magazine include Bruce Weber, Annie Leibovitz, Mario Testino and Herb Ritts, who have all provided the magazine with a string of lavish covers and full-page portraits of current celebrities. Among the most famous cover photographs is More Demi Moore, a 1991 portrait by Annie Leibovitz in which actress Demi Moore was naked and pregnant. The April 1999 issue featured an image of actor Mike Myers dressed as a Hindu deity for a photo spread by David LaChapelle. After criticism, both the photographer and the magazine apologized.

"I took part in a photo shoot that was supposed to be 'artistic' and now .... I feel so embarrassed .... I apologize to my fans who I care so deeply about."

— Disney and 15-year-old Miley Cyrus apologized on April 27, 2008 for a Vanity Fair portrait that gave the impression Cyrus was topless. She reversed her position in a 2018 post: "IM NOT SORRY Fuck YOU #10YearsAgo".

On April 25, 2008, Entertainment Tonight reported that 15-year-old Miley Cyrus had posed topless for a photo shoot by Annie Leibovitz for Vanity Fair. A Disney spokesperson described the photoshoot as an effort to "deliberately manipulate a 15-year-old to sell magazines". The full photograph was published as part of an April 27 New York Times story, and Cyrus released an apology statement that said the photos were intended to be 'artistic'. The New York Times clarified two days later that despite the impression that Cyrus had posed bare-breasted, she was wrapped in a bedsheet and not actually topless. In an Instagram story posted ten years after the incident, Cyrus reversed her position: "IM NOT SORRY Fuck YOU #10YearsAgo".

== Other Vanity Fair operations ==
=== Events ===
As a successor to a similar invitation-only event annually held by the late agent Irving Paul Lazar, the first Vanity Fair Oscar Party took place in 1994. During its first years, the magazine's Oscar party was co-hosted by producer Steve Tisch at Morton's in West Hollywood. At first, editor Graydon Carter kept the invitation list small, at around 120 for dinner. In 2008, in sympathy with a Writers Guild of America strike, Vanity Fair canceled its annual party. Between 2009 and 2013, the party was held at Sunset Tower. The 2014 edition took place in a temporary, 12,000-square-foot glass-walled structure at 8680 Sunset Boulevard. Vanity Fair makes a limited number of invitations available each year for charity. In 2021, Vanity Fair cancelled its annual party due to the COVID-19 pandemic.

In recent years, Vanity Fair and Bloomberg have hosted an after-party at the French ambassador's residence in Washington, D.C. following the White House Correspondents' Association dinner.

=== Video ventures ===
Condé Nast Entertainment launched a Vanity Fair YouTube channel in July 2013. In anticipation of its 100th anniversary that year, Vanity Fair co-produced 10 short films, one to celebrate each decade, from well-known documentary filmmakers like Barbara Kopple and including the film producer Judd Apatow, and actors Don Cheadle and Bryce Dallas Howard. In 2013, Condé Nast Entertainment struck a deal with Discovery Communications-owned cable channel Investigation Discovery for Vanity Fair Confidential, a crime and mystery documentary TV series based on stories from Vanity Fair magazine.Vanity Fair launched The Hive in June 2016 to cover its online coverage of business, politics, and technology. In January 2017, Vanity Fair's Hive and Condé Nast Entertainment partnered with Cheddar online TV channel to create a live weekly series called VF Hive on Cheddar. Editor Graydon Carter called the series a "representation of how people are consuming more voraciously than ever".

== Legal disputes ==
=== Mohamed Al-Fayed lawsuit ===
The businessman Mohamed Al-Fayed launched a two-year legal battle with Condé Nast, the publisher of Vanity Fair, due to details of alleged sexual assaults committed by Al-Fayed that were published in "Holy War at Harrods", a 1995 Vanity Fair article by Maureen Orth. In December 1997, Al-Fayed dropped the case and provided a settlement. The chief executive of Condé Nast UK, Nicholas Coleridge, had met Michael Cole, Al-Fayed's Director of Public Affairs, in the steam baths of the Bath & Racquets Club in Mayfair to ensure that neither of them carried covert listening devices. The pair discussed ending the libel battle between their respective employers, but no agreement was then reached. Both sides of the dispute paid for their own costs following the ending of the suit. No apology was issued by Vanity Fair and none of the text of the article was retracted.

=== Roman Polanski lawsuit ===
In 2005, Vanity Fair was found liable in a libel lawsuit from film director Roman Polanski due to a 2002 Vanity Fair article that said Polanski had made sexual advances toward a Norwegian model while traveling to the funeral of his wife Sharon Tate. The disputed details were included by the writer A. E. Hotchner who credited them to Lewis H. Lapham: the article recounted Lapham's story that at New York restaurant Elaine's in August 1969, Polanski had supposedly boasted he could turn the model into "the next Sharon Tate".

The trial began on July 18, 2005 in the British courts, which ultimately ruled the alleged scene did not occur on the date given because Polanski did not dine at the restaurant until three weeks later. The trial included testimonies from Mia Farrow and others, and the Norwegian former model disputed details. The case was notable because for the first time in English legal history, the court permitted Polanski to testify via a video link from his home in France where he was living as a fugitive from US law enforcement. Polanski was awarded damages by the High Court in London. Vanity Fair's Graydon Carter said "I find it amazing that a man who lives in France can sue a magazine that is published in America in a British courtroom."

== International editions and editors ==
Vanity Fair started an international edition in 1991, and there are now several. International editions are currently published in the United Kingdom (since 1991), Italy (since 2003, ISSN 1723-6673), Spain (since 2008), and France (since 2013). Previous international editions existed in Mexico (2015–2018) and Germany (2007–2009). Vanity Fair Germany launched in February 2007 at a cost of €50 million, then the most expensive new magazine in Germany in years and Condé Nast's biggest investment outside the United States. After circulation had plummeted from half a million to less than 200,000 per week, the German edition was shut down in 2009. The Italian Vanity Fair is published weekly.

| Country | Circulation dates | Editor-in-chief | Start year | End year |
|---|---|---|---|---|
| United States (Vanity Fair) | 1913–1936 | Frank Crowninshield | 1914 | 1936 |
| United States (Vanity Fair) | 1983–present | Richard Locke | 1982 | 1983 |
| United States (Vanity Fair) | 1983–present | Leo Lerman | 1983 | 1983 |
| United States (Vanity Fair) | 1983–present | Tina Brown | 1984 | 1992 |
| United States (Vanity Fair) | 1983–present | Graydon Carter | 1992 | 2017 |
| United States (Vanity Fair) | 1983–present | Radhika Jones | 2017 | 2025 |
| United States (Vanity Fair) | 1983–present | Mark Guiducci | 2025 | present |
| Italy (Vanity Fair Italia) | 1990–1991 | Paolo Pietroni | 1990 | 1991 |
| Italy (Vanity Fair Italia) | 2003–present | Marisa Deimichei | 2003 | 2004 |
| Italy (Vanity Fair Italia) | 2003–present | Carlo Verdelli | 2004 | 2006 |
| Italy (Vanity Fair Italia) | 2003–present | Luca Dini | 2006 | 2017 |
| Italy (Vanity Fair Italia) | 2003–present | Daniela Hamaui | 2017 | 2018 |
| Italy (Vanity Fair Italia) | 2003–present | Simone Marchetti | 2018 | present |
| United Kingdom (Vanity Fair London) | 1991–present | Tina Brown | 1991 | 1992 |
| United Kingdom (Vanity Fair London) | 1991–present | Graydon Carter | 1992 | 2017 |
| United Kingdom (Vanity Fair London) | 1991–present | Radhika Jones | 2017 | 2025 |
| United Kingdom (Vanity Fair London) | 1991–present | Mark Guiducci | 2025 | present |
| Germany (Vanity Fair Germany) | 2007–2009 | Ulf Poschardt | 2007 | 2008 |
| Germany (Vanity Fair Germany) | 2007–2009 | Nikolaus Albrecht | 2008 | 2009 |
| Spain (Vanity Fair España) | 2008–present | Lourdes Garzón | 2006 | 2017 |
| Spain (Vanity Fair España) | 2008–present | Alberto Moreno | 2017 | present |
| France (Vanity Fair France) | 2013–present | Anne Boulay | 2013 | 2019 |
| France (Vanity Fair France) | 2013–present | Joseph Ghosn | 2019 | 2021 |
| France (Vanity Fair France) | 2013–present | Olivier Bouchara | 2021 | present |
| Mexico (Vanity Fair México) | 2015–2018 | Lourdes Garzón | 2015 | 2017 |
| Mexico (Vanity Fair México) | 2015–2018 | Alberto Moreno | 2017 | 2018 |

== See also ==
- Condé Nast, publisher of Vanity Fair
- International Best Dressed Hall of Fame List
- World Architecture Survey, published by Vanity Fair in 2010
