= Mohamed Al-Fayed =

Egyptian businessman (1929–2023)

- محمد الفايد
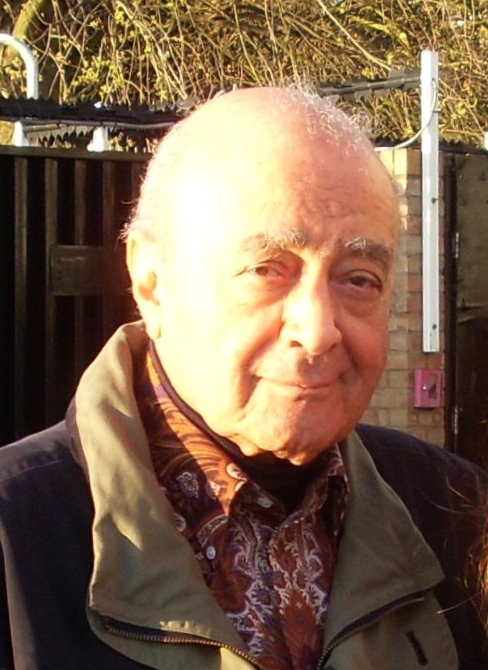
- Al-Fayed in 2007
- Born: 27 January 1929; Alexandria, Egypt
- Died: 30 August 2023 (aged 94); Westminster, London, England
- Burial place: Barrow Green Court
- Occupation: Businessman
- Spouses: Samira Khashoggi (m. 1954; div. 1956); Heini Wathén (m. 1985)
- Children: 5, including Dodi and Omar

Mohamed Abdel Moneim Al-Fayed (Note: Arabic: محمد عبد المنعم الفايد, romanized: Muḥammad ʿAbd al-Munʿīm al-Fāyid, Egyptian Arabic pronunciation: [mæˈħæmmæd ʕæbde‿lˈmenʕem elˈfæːjed].) (/ælˈfaɪ.ɛd/; 27 January 1929 – 30 August 2023) was an Egyptian businessman. His residence and primary business interests were in the United Kingdom from the mid-1960s, and his business interests included ownership of the Hôtel Ritz Paris, Harrods department store, and Fulham Football Club. At the time of his death in 2023, Forbes estimated his wealth at US$2 billion.

Fayed was married to Samira Khashoggi from 1954 to 1956. They had a son, Dodi, who was in a romantic relationship with Diana, Princess of Wales, when they both died in a car crash in Paris in 1997. Fayed claimed that the crash was orchestrated by MI6 on the instructions of Prince Philip, Duke of Edinburgh. In 2011, Fayed financially supported an unreleased documentary film, Unlawful Killing, that presented his version of events.

Fayed was the subject of media scrutiny and investigations into allegations of sexist and discriminatory practices at Harrods, including sexual harassment and assault. Early media scrutiny of sexual misconduct allegations against Al-Fayed was curtailed by his frequent threats of litigation. In 2024, the year following his death, he became the subject of multiple posthumous accusations of rape, with over 200 women making complaints of illegal activity.

== Early life ==
Fayed was born on 27 January 1929 in the Gomrok neighbourhood of Alexandria, in the Kingdom of Egypt, the eldest son of an Egyptian teacher. His family originated from Sharqia Governorate. His brothers Ali and Salah were his business colleagues.

At age 19, Al-Fayed was selling bottles of Coca-Cola on the streets of Alexandria; by age 21, he was selling Singer sewing machines. In 1952, Al-Fayed was hired by a friend, Tousson El Barrawi, and the 17-year-old Adnan Khashoggi for their furniture import business. Al-Fayed excelled at the business and impressed Adnan's father, Mohamed Kashoggi, the personal physician of the King of Saudi Arabia. In the early 1950s, Al-Fayed travelled to Europe for the first time, visiting France, Italy and Switzerland. Returning to Egypt, Al-Fayed confessed to his wife, Samira Kashoggi, Adnan Kashoggi's sister, that he had had an affair, and she demanded a divorce. Al-Fayed terminated his partnership with Adnan Kashoggi, and secretly withdrew £100,000 from Kashoggi's Al Nasr trading company. Kashoggi issued a writ against Al-Fayed for the return of the money, and later agreed with Al-Fayed to forgive the money and other loans and debts in return for Samira's freedom to remarry and return to Egypt. Following Egyptian President Nasser's threats to expropriate foreign businesses, Al-Fayed was able to take control of a small shipping company, owned by Leon Carasso, who wished to emigrate. Carasso later claimed that Al-Fayed had defaulted on the agreed payment for his business. Fayed also acquired interests in other transport companies at favourable prices. After Nasser ordered the confiscation of Egyptian property in 1961, Al-Fayed transferred ownership of his Middle Eastern Navigation Company to Genoa in Italy.

On 12 June 1964, Al-Fayed arrived in Haiti, then under the control of François "Papa Doc" Duvalier. Al-Fayed entered the country on a Kuwaiti passport, and introduced himself as Sheikh Mohamed Fayed. Shortly after his arrival, Duvalier cancelled a ten-year contract with a US company that gave them monopoly control over Haiti's oil industry and signed a similar contract with Al-Fayed for 50 years. Al-Fayed also worked with the geologist George de Mohrenschildt. He terminated his stay in Haiti six months later when a sample of "crude oil" provided by Haitian associates proved to be low-grade molasses. Al-Fayed promised to use his connections in Dubai to help bring investment to the Caribbean island, if they allowed him to build an oil refinery, and develop the wharf at Port-au-Prince. Al-Fayed had exclusive control over the collection of fees for docking, unloading, and loading at Haiti's main port, and this caused resentment in the Haitian shipping industry. Al-Fayed was 'tapped' for $30,000 by Duvalier, but rather than pay, and fearful of the growing anger of the shipping agents, he left Haiti in December 1964. Fayed later claimed that the Haitian government owed him $2 million. The 1988 Department of Trade and Industry (DTI) report on Al-Fayed's background stated "we have no doubt at all that Mohamed Fayed perpetrated a substantial deceit on the government and people of Haiti in 1964 ... he deprived the harbor authority of over US $100,000 of money it could ill-afford to lose".

Fayed then moved to England, where he lived in central London.

== Career in Dubai ==
Ingratiating himself in London's Arab expatriate community, Al-Fayed met an Iraqi businessman, Salim Abu Alwan, and through Alwan was introduced to Mahdi Al Tajir. Tajir was then an adviser to Sheikh Rashid bin Saeed Al Maktoum of the United Arab Emirates. Rashid was the Emir of Dubai, and oil was soon to be discovered in Dubai, which would transform the wealth of the emirate.

Tajir informed Al-Fayed that Dubai was penniless and needed to borrow £1 million to build modern harbour facilities. Al-Fayed secured a loan of £9 million from Imre Rochlitz, an American lawyer. Rochlitz's Jewish ancestry caused embarrassment to Tajir, and later caused Rochlitz to reject Al-Fayed's offer of a formal partnership. Al-Fayed earned £1.5 million commission from the contract for British engineering company Costain to carry out the work to the port. Al-Fayed also assisted in securing finance for the Dubai World Trade Centre. The banker David Douglas-Home of Morgan Grenfell was responsible for managing the contract. By the mid-1970s, Costain had gained over £280 million of contracts thanks to Al-Fayed and Tajir, and Al-Fayed bought 20.84% of Costain's shares. He was later appointed a company director.

With his earnings from commissions on various projects in Dubai, Al-Fayed bought a Rolls-Royce, a large chalet in Gstaad, and the remaining apartments of 60 Park Lane in Mayfair, where he had been living for the past few years.

In 1974, Al-Fayed met Roland 'Tiny' Rowland, a British businessman with extensive interests in Southern Africa, and the chairman of international conglomerate Lonrho. Fayed's complex professional relationship with Rowland dominated his life for the next 20 years, with legal repercussions continuing into the late 1990s.

Rowland persuaded Al-Fayed to exchange his shares in Costain for 5.5 million shares in Lonrho in March 1975, and Al-Fayed used the profit from the deal to buy another 3 million shares in Lonrho and become a director of the company. Al-Fayed soon became alarmed at Rowland's use of Lonrho's money to fund his lifestyle and to pay large bribes in Africa, as well as his syphoning off company profits into a secret bank account in Switzerland.

The British Department of Trade and Industry began to investigate Lonrho in early 1976, and an alarmed Al-Fayed quit the company in May 1976. He sold his Lonrho shares to Kuwaiti investors and bought back his Costain shares for £11 million. Tajir's influence in Dubai was waning by 1977, and Al-Fayed was excluded from the commission process for a new aluminium smelter, and the development of Jebel Ali, putting Costain's future profits at risk.

In 1993, Al-Fayed was visited at Harrods by Mohammed Alabbar, the director of Dubai's Department of Economic Development. Alabbar had been appointed by Sheikh Maktoum to eradicate the system of large commission payments from previous decades. Tajir was challenged in the British courts to repay his alleged excessive profits earned from the construction of Dubai's aluminium smelter, and Al-Fayed was targeted over his management contract of the Dubai World Trade Centre. Al-Fayed's contract to manage the centre was later terminated by the Maktoums, and Al-Fayed sued them for compensation estimated between £30 to 90 million. The case came to court in October 1994, and after trying to unsuccessfully settle the case with the Maktoums, Al-Fayed was due to testify on 17 October. Al-Fayed's lawyer informed the court that morning that he had been taken seriously ill with neck and back complications, and could not fly to Dubai as a result.

Alabbar had secretly taped Al-Fayed on his way to Harrods that morning, and the tapes were shown to the court the next day. Al-Fayed's lack of ill health was evident, and Al-Fayed was informed by his lawyer of the disastrous effect that his deception had on the case that day.

In the mid-1960s, he met the ruler of Dubai, Sheikh Rashid Bin Saeed Al Maktoum, who entrusted him with helping transform Dubai, where he set up IMS (International Marine Services) in 1968. Fayed introduced British companies including the Costain Group (of which he became a director and 30% shareholder), Bernard Sunley & Sons, and Taylor Woodrow to the emirate to carry out construction work.

=== Relationship with the Sultan of Brunei ===
Al-Fayed became a financial adviser to the then Sultan of Brunei Omar Ali Saifuddien III in 1966. Al-Fayed told Maureen Orth that he had known Hassanal Bolkiah, who succeeded Saifuddien on his abdication, since the Sultan's childhood and that they had met during the building of a trade centre in Brunei. Tiny Rowland told DTI inspectors that Al-Fayed had told him that he negotiated an introduction to the Sultan for $500,000 plus a percentage of any resulting business with an Indian holy man and alleged fraudster, Shri Chandra Swamiji Maharaj. Rowland later admitted this account was untrue.

In mid-1984, Al-Fayed received several powers of attorney and written authorisations from the Sultan to carry out tasks for him. These gave Al-Fayed access to large sums of the Sultan's money. The Sultan was then the richest man in the world. During this period, the bank of the three Fayed brothers, the Royal Bank of Scotland, received a transfer of hundreds of millions of dollars from Switzerland into their accounts. RBS assumed that the money belonged to the Sultan, but Al-Fayed told the bank that his portfolio was separate from the Sultan's. The DTI report noted that "It may be no more than coincidence that this vast increase in disposable wealth followed quickly on the admission of Mohamed to the Sultan's confidence ... It is, however, a very powerful coincidence."

Using a power of attorney, Al-Fayed bought the Dorchester Hotel for the Sultan in 1985. Al-Fayed accompanied the Sultan to 10 Downing Street to visit Prime Minister Margaret Thatcher in January 1985, with sterling in decline and threatening the economy. The Sultan, who had moved £5 billion of assets out of pounds, moved the assets back into sterling. Al-Fayed took credit for this and for persuading the Sultan to give half a billion pounds of contracts to British defence industries.

== Rowland and later business career ==
Fayed joined the board of the mining conglomerate Lonrho in 1975 and resigned in May 1976, selling his shares to Kuwaiti investors as the Department of Trade and Industry began investigating the company.

In 1998, Rowland, who died that year, accused Fayed of stealing papers and jewels from his Harrods safe deposit box. Fayed was arrested, along with the director of Harrods security, John MacNamara, and four other employees, but the charges were dropped. Sensitive documents were stolen, along with jewellery, rare stamps and a gold cigarette case, among other items. Fayed settled the dispute with a payment to Rowland's widow; he also sued the Metropolitan Police for false arrest in 2002, but lost the case. In 1994, House of Fraser went public, but Fayed retained ownership of Harrods. He unsuccessfully applied for British citizenship twice, in 1994 and 1999. It has been suggested that his feud with Rowland contributed to the first refusal.

In 1996, Al-Fayed bought the rights to the historic British humorous magazine Punch, and it was relaunched later that year, at a cost of £3 million, under new editor Peter McKay. Punch had previously been published from 1841 to 1992. The relaunch was not successful, with Punch failing to match its satirical competitor, Private Eye. Punch folded for a second time in 2002.

In January 1997, Al-Fayed established a new political organisation, The People's Trust, to promote a crusade against a "culture of violence". The establishment of The People's Trust followed Al-Fayed's support for anti-abortion candidates and the Christian Democrat, the newspaper of the Movement for Christian Democracy. The People's Trust planned to write to all candidates in the 1997 United Kingdom general election in order to identify a group of MPs who put "their consciences, their constituents and their country at the heart of their politics, rather than their party" The People's Trust was dissolved in September 1998 after failing to file its accounts.

After Vanity Fair published Maureen Orth's article "Holy War at Harrods", Al-Fayed sued the American magazine for libel in September 1995 but withdrew his suit in 1997. Al-Fayed invited Tom Bower to write his biography in 1996. Bower's biography, Fayed: The Unauthorized Biography was published in 1998. Al-Fayed announced his intention to sue, but withdrew his suit. Orth and Bower were both attempted victims of entrapment by Al-Fayed, with Al-Fayed's staff offering allegedly stolen documents to the writers.

=== Cash-for-questions ===
In 1994, in what became known as the cash-for-questions affair, Fayed revealed the names of MPs he had paid to ask questions in Parliament on his behalf, but who had failed to declare their fees. It saw Conservative MPs Neil Hamilton and Tim Smith leave the government in disgrace, and a Committee on Standards in Public Life established to prevent such corruption occurring again. Fayed also revealed that cabinet minister Jonathan Aitken stayed for free at the Ritz Hotel in Paris at the same time as a group of Saudi arms dealers, leading to Aitken's unsuccessful libel case and later imprisonment for perjury. During this period, Al-Fayed's spokesman was Michael Cole, a former BBC journalist.

Hamilton lost a libel action against Al-Fayed in December 1999 and an appeal against the verdict in December 2000. The former MP has always denied that he was paid by Al-Fayed for asking questions in Parliament. Hamilton's libel action related to a Channel 4 Dispatches documentary broadcast on 16 January 1997 in which Al-Fayed stated that the MP had received up to £110,000 in cash and other gratuities for asking parliamentary questions. Hamilton's basis for his appeal was that the original verdict was invalid because Al-Fayed had paid £10,000 for documents stolen from the dustbins of Hamilton's legal representatives by Benjamin Pell.

In 2003, Fayed moved from Surrey to Switzerland, alleging a breach in an agreement with the British tax authority. In 2005, he moved back to Britain, saying that he "regards Britain as home". He moored a yacht called the Sokar in Monaco prior to selling it in 2014.

=== House of Fraser group and Harrods ===
In 1984, Al-Fayed and his brother Ali, purchased a 30 per cent stake for £138 million in the House of Fraser, a group that included the Knightsbridge department store Harrods, from Tiny Rowland, the head of Lonrho. Lonrho had been pursuing control of the House of Fraser since 1977, and had been prevented from acquiring the company by the Monopolies and Mergers Commission in a 1981 ruling, although its purchase of The Observer was approved.

After his purchase of the House of Fraser shares, Al-Fayed demanded that Rowland leave the board of House of Fraser, and courted the chairman of House of Fraser, Roland Smith, who received a retroactive bonus once Al-Fayed had acquired the company. The Secretary of State for Trade and Industry, John Biffen, ruled that Lonrho must give an undertaking not to buy any more shares in the House of Fraser, a ruling that left Roland "incandescent". Following the ruling Rowland began to sell shares to Al-Fayed, whom he had met while Al-Fayed was briefly a director of Lonrho. Rowland later said that "I knew that Tootsie (as Rowland called Al-Fayed) could never afford to purchase the whole of House of Fraser."

Al-Fayed bought the remaining 70 per cent of the House of Fraser in early 1985 for £615 million, sparking a bitter feud between him and Rowland. The former editor of The Observer, Donald Trelford, believes that Rowland was "...certainly motivated in his vendetta against Al-Fayed by outrage at having been conned. But he was also convinced that his shareholders had been cheated." Rowland felt his shareholders had been cheated as he believed Al-Fayed had used a power of attorney that he held for the Sultan of Brunei, then the richest man in the world, to fund the purchase. Rowland's bitterness also came from his belief that Al-Fayed had lied to the British government about the sources of his wealth, and that the government had failed to investigate Al-Fayed's credentials and had approved the sale without a reference to the Monopolies and Mergers Commission (while Lonrho had faced three inquiries under the commission), and that the new trade secretary, Norman Tebbit, had prevented Lonrho from bidding while Al-Fayed's deal went through.

=== Origins of wealth ===
To take control of the House of Fraser group, the Al-Fayed brothers had to convince the British government that they possessed sufficient assets to securely purchase the group. The Al-Fayeds invented a spurious family history of old money for themselves. Represented by the investment bankers Kleinwort Benson and the law firm Herbert Smith, the Al-Fayeds' bankers submitted to the government a one and a half page summary of their assets, which the government accepted. The Al-Fayed brothers claimed they were from a family of wealthy cotton traders. Their wealth was estimated by their bankers, Kleinwort Benson, to total "several billion dollars". A press release by Kleinwort Benson stated that the Al-Fayeds were an "old established Egyptian family who for more than 100 years were ship owners, land owners and industrialists in Egypt." The report said that they were raised in Britain and fled Egypt following the rise to power of Gamal Abdel Nasser.

The DTI report came to very different conclusions about the scale of their wealth, stating that;

If people had known, for instance, that they only owned one luxury hotel; that their interests in oil exploration consortia were of no current value; that their banking interests consisted of less than 5 percent of the issued share capital of a bank and were worth less than $10 million; that they had no current interests in construction projects: that far from being 'leading shipowners in the liner trade' they only owned two roll-on roll-off 1600 ton cargo ferries; if all these facts had been known people would have been less disposed to believe that the Al-Fayeds really owned the money they were using to buy HOF (House of Fraser)

1988 DTI report into the background of the Fayed brothers

In March 1985, the Al-Fayeds announced a formal cash offer for House of Fraser of £615 million, which Kleinwort claimed was untethered by any borrowings. There has not yet been a comprehensive account of the Al-Fayeds' finances in 1985, but the DTI report claimed that by October 1984 the Al-Fayeds had at least $600 million in the Royal Bank of Scotland and in a Swiss bank at their disposal. "We were not told the source of any of these funds or given a credible story as to how and where they were obtained", said the DTI inspectors. The money the Al-Fayeds claimed as their own was apparently used as collateral in order to guarantee a loan of more than £400 million to buy House of Fraser.

Al-Fayed told Maureen Orth in an interview that "If you have a company with tremendous assets like Harrods...you have no problem. You don't need to use cash." The first loan, from a Swiss bank, was replaced with another loan secured by House of Fraser shares, the Al-Fayeds had acquired the House of Fraser with none of their own money used to purchase it. The Al-Fayeds ownership of Harrods was complete when the British government issued a press release announcing that it would not refer the Al-Fayeds' bid to the Monopolies and Mergers Commission.

During the final stages of the Al-Fayeds purchase of Harrods, Tiny Rowland wrote to the Secretary of State for Trade and Industry, Norman Tebbit, repudiating the Al-Fayeds story of the origin of their families' wealth. Rowland also enlisted the help of Ashraf Marwan, to aid him in his exposing of the Al-Fayeds. The Observer newspaper, owned by Rowland, was used to attack the Al-Fayeds. Al-Fayed issued a libel suit against The Observer, and other newspapers critical of the Al-Fayeds were routinely threatened or issued with similar writs. All critical reporting of the Al-Fayeds outside of the Observer was virtually stopped.

=== 1988 DTI Report ===
From 1985 until 1987, Rowland led a worldwide investigation into Al-Fayed and his acquisition of Harrods. He employed accountants and solicitors, private detectives and freelance journalists in an operation, said to cost many millions of pounds, that was beyond the scope of any newspaper inquiry. Illicit bugging devices were used and some of the money went in bribes to officials to unearth incriminating documents in Egypt, Haiti, Dubai, Brunei, France and Switzerland, allegedly proving fraudulent dealings by Al-Fayed and showing his humble origins and limited net worth.

The results of Rowland's investigations into the Al-Fayeds were given to the Sunday newspaper The Observer, owned by Lonrho. The Observer campaigned for an inquiry into the House of Fraser purchase, and an inquiry by inspectors from the Department of Trade and Industry was delivered in July 1988, but the DTI declined to publish it. Rowland obtained a copy in 1989, and the report was published in a special free 16-page edition of The Observer on a Thursday morning. Publishing the report helped put the DTI inspectors' findings into the public arena, helping The Observers libel defence, with the aim of pressuring the government into releasing the report. Lawyers from the DTI produced a court injunction and ordered all copies of The Observer's version of the report to be handed over or pulped. The report was officially published in 1990.

The DTI report said that the Al-Fayed brothers had 'dishonestly represented their origins, their wealth, their business interests and their resources to the Secretary of State, to the Office of Fair Trading, to the House of Fraser board and shareholders, and their own advisers' Rowland and the Lohnro group had previously been strongly criticised by a 1976 DTI report, and had been described by Prime Minister Edward Heath as "an unpleasant and unacceptable face of capitalism".

In 1993, the European Court of Human Rights dismissed a case brought by Al-Fayed and his brothers against the British Government, which had accused them of misrepresentation in the DTI report. They contended that the report had ruined their reputation and was not subject to appeal.

=== Ownership of Harrods ===
Harrods had entered a steady decline under Hugh Fraser, yet still accounted for half of the House of Fraser group's profits. Determined to restore Harrods' fortunes, Al-Fayed hired Brian Walsh as manager of House of Fraser. Walsh created divisions in the company, and more than 200 buyers resigned in the next two years. Following arguments with Al-Fayed, Walsh was fired in October 1987. To calm staff, Al-Fayed distributed envelopes containing £2,000 in cash. Following Walsh's departure, Al-Fayed moved his offices onto the fifth floor of Harrods, and took a more hands-on role as chairman of the store. Walsh was replaced by Michael Ellis-Jones, who was fired after eight weeks.

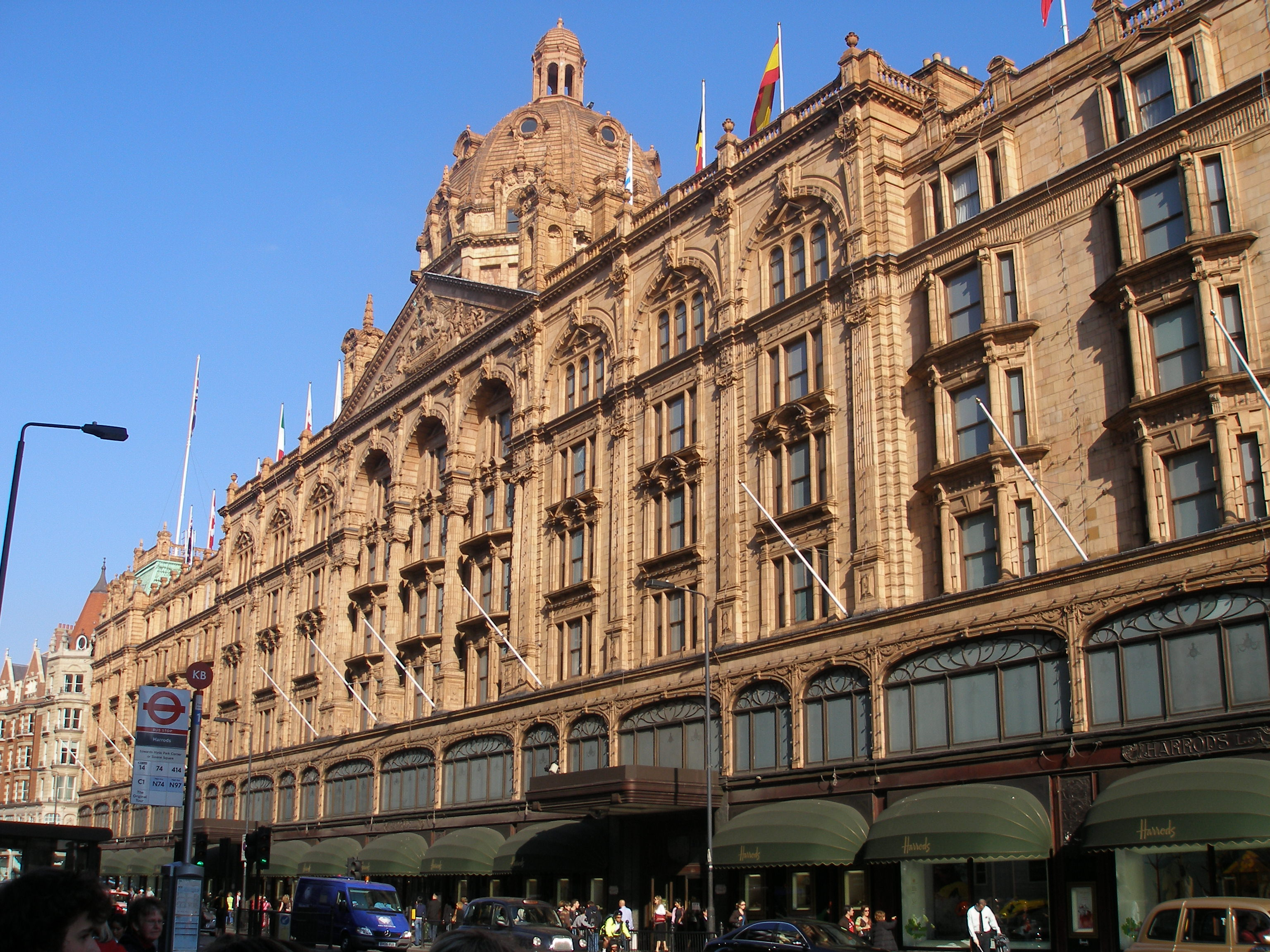
The Harrods Building

Christoph Bettermann became the deputy chairman of Harrods in 1990, after having worked for Al-Fayed in Dubai since 1984. Bettermann was approached to work in the Emirate of Sharjah in April 1991, and in June Bettermann told Maureen Orth, Al-Fayed "showed me a written transcript of a phone conversation between the headhunter and me. He accused me of breaking our trust by talking to these people. I told him, 'If you don't trust me, I resign. I cannot trust you if you bugged my phone.'" Bettermann quit his job at Harrods and went to work for an oil company in Sharjah.

Al-Fayed wrote to the ruler of Sharjah, and accused Bettermann of stealing large sums of money. Bettermann was cleared by three courts in which Fayed had pressed charges.

Al-Fayed delighted in retail theatre, and during his 25 years at Harrods dressed as a Harrods doorman, a boy scout and Father Christmas over the years. Celebrities were also hired to open the annual Harrods sale, and Harrods sponsored the annual Royal Windsor Horse Show as it had done since 1982. In 1997 Harrods' sponsorship of the horse show was terminated after Prime Minister John Major had urged the chairman of the show to find a new sponsor to save Queen Elizabeth II from association with Al-Fayed.

The artist and designer, William Mitchell, was hired by Al-Fayed to create an 'entertaining retail environment'; this resulted in the creation of an Egyptian Hall on the ground floor of Harrods and, following its success, the Egyptian Escalators, which replaced the store's central lifts. Mitchell also designed memorials for Dodi Fayed and Diana, Princess of Wales at Harrods. Al-Fayed claimed to have invested more than £400 million restoring Harrods, with £20 million or £75 million being spent on the Egyptian escalator.

In 1991, the House of Commons Trade and Industry Committee told the Governor of the Bank of England, Robin Leigh-Pemberton to order the Fayeds to transfer control of the Harrods Bank to trustees, after they found that the Fayeds were not "fit and proper" to run the bank. Al-Fayed bought his brother, Saleh, out of his interest in Harrods for £100 million in 1994. In 1994, before House of Fraser plc was relisted on the London Stock Exchange, Harrods was moved out of the group so that it could remain under the private ownership of Al-Fayed and his family.

==== Employee relations ====
Al-Fayed was concerned by the loyalty of his staff, and employed two young Greek women as spies, to report on their fellow employees. The telephones of the shop workers' trade union, USDAW were bugged. Employees were signed to three-month contracts, and were often fired without agreed compensation, and forced to go to an industrial tribunal. Al-Fayed also listened in to his employees, and secretly recorded conversations about their sex lives.

Al-Fayed would customarily fire employees who offended his idea of aesthetics, being most offended by overweight staff or black people. To avoid hiring black people, Harrods required applicants to submit photographs. The number of black people employed by Harrods was eventually half the number employed by other London stores.

Francesca Bettermann, Harrods former legal counsel, said of Al-Fayed "He likes a pretty face. He wouldn't hire someone who was ugly. He liked them light-skinned, well educated, English, and young...I remember there was something on the application form that said, 'Your colour, race' I said, 'You're not allowed to put that on the form,' and he said, 'Well, make sure they put proper photos in, then.'" In 1994, Harrods settled five racial-discrimination cases brought against the company, and, according to trade union officials, between June and September 1994, 23 of the 28 staff fired were black people, who had held mostly menial jobs.

A florist was rejected for employment by Harrods because she was black. The chairman of the subsequent industrial tribunal condemned Harrods's defence as 'malicious and dishonest', stating 'there was an act of blatant racial discrimination...by a very senior personnel officer working in a very large organisation...there was lying and deceit on the part of Harrods personnel to conceal the act of discrimination. There was dishonest testimony by Harrods personnel'.

==== Royal warrants ====
In August 2010, in a letter to the Daily Telegraph, Al-Fayed revealed that he had burnt Harrods's royal warrants, after taking them down in 2000. Harrods had held the Royal warrants since 1910. Describing the warrants as a "curse", Al-Fayed claimed that business had tripled since their removal. The Duke of Edinburgh removed his warrant in January 2000, and the other warrants were removed from Harrods by Al-Fayed in December, pending their five-yearly review. The Duke of Edinburgh had been banned from Harrods by Al-Fayed. Film of the burning of the warrants in 2009 was shown in the final scene of Unlawful Killing, a film funded by Al-Fayed and directed by Keith Allen.

==== Sale of Harrods ====
After denials that it was for sale, Harrods was sold to Qatar Holdings, the sovereign wealth fund of the emirate of Qatar in May 2010. A spokesman for Al-Fayed said "in reaching the decision to retire, [Al-Fayed] wished to ensure that the legacy and traditions that he has built up in Harrods would be continued." Harrods was sold for £1.5 billion.

Al-Fayed later said that he decided to sell Harrods following the difficulty in getting his dividend approved by the trustee of the Harrods pension fund. Fayed said, "I'm here every day, I can't take my profit because I have to take a permission of those bloody idiots...I say is this right? Is this logic? Somebody like me? I run a business and I need to take bloody fucking trustee's permission to take my profit". Al-Fayed was appointed honorary chairman of Harrods, for six months.

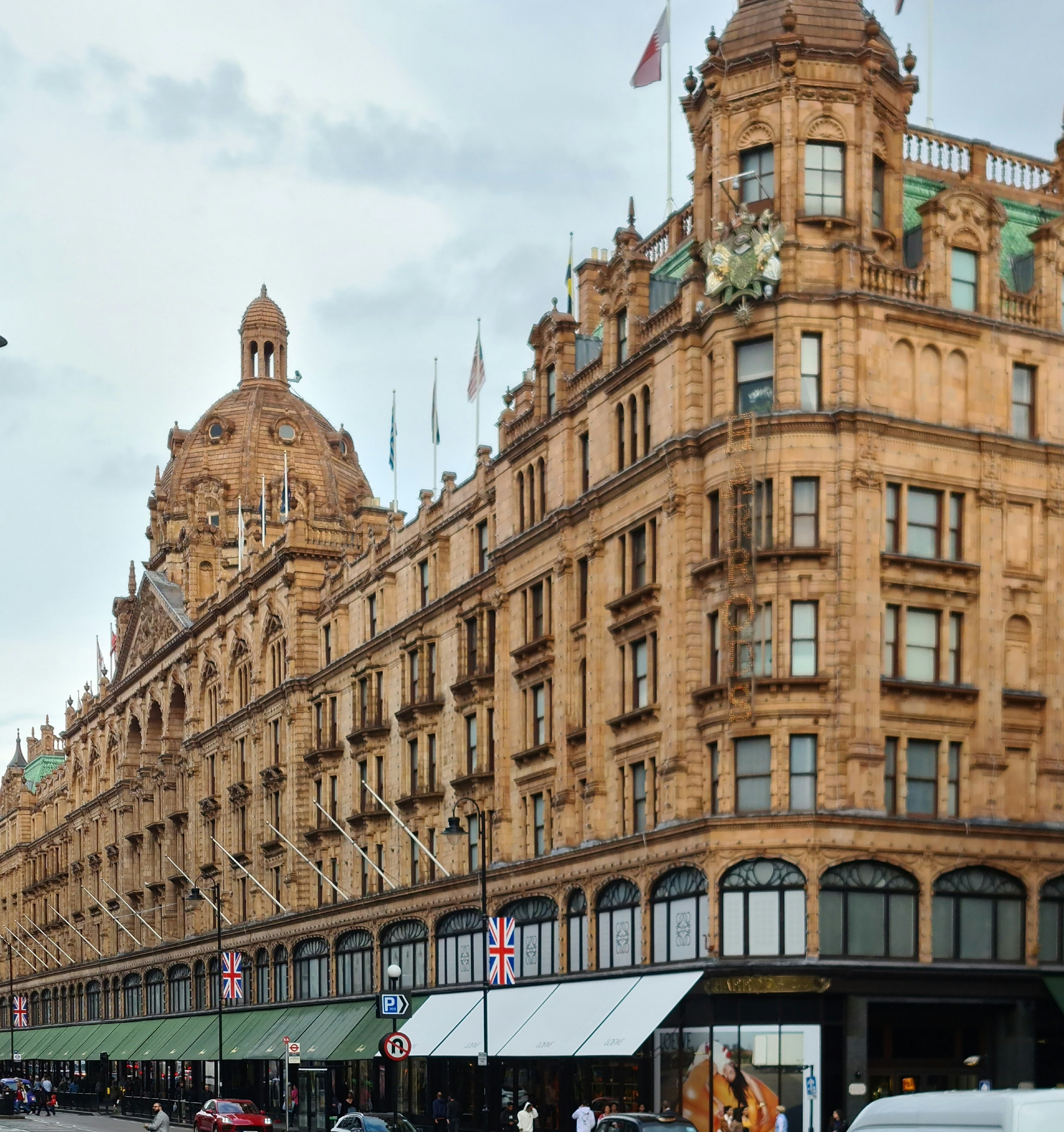
The Brompton Road frontage of Harrods in 2022

=== Scotland real estate ===
In 1972, Fayed purchased the Balnagown estate in Easter Ross in northern Scotland. From an initial 4.8 hectares (12 acres), Al-Fayed went on to build the estate up to 26,300 hectares (65,000 acres). He invested more than £20 million in the estate, restored the 14th-century pink Balnagown Castle, and created a tourist accommodation business. The Highlands of Scotland tourist board awarded Al-Fayed the Freedom of the Scottish Highlands in 2002, in recognition of his "efforts to promote the area".

As an Egyptian with links to Scotland, Al-Fayed funded a 2008 reprint of the 15th-century chronicle Scotichronicon by Walter Bower. The Scotichronicon describes how Scota, a daughter of an Egyptian Pharaoh, fled her family and landed in Scotland, bringing with her the Stone of Scone. According to the chronicle, Scotland was later named in her honour. The tale is disputed by modern historians. Al-Fayed later declared that "The Scots are originally Egyptians and that's the truth."

In 2009, Al-Fayed revealed that he was a supporter of Scottish independence from the United Kingdom, announcing to the Scots that "It's time for you to waken up and detach yourselves from the English and their terrible politicians...whatever help is needed for Scotland to regain its independence, I will provide it...when you Scots regain your freedom, I am ready to be your president."

=== Charity ===
Fayed set up the Al Fayed Charitable Foundation in 1987 aiming to help children with life-limiting conditions and children living in poverty. The charity works mainly with charities and hospices for disabled and neglected children in the UK, Thailand, and Mongolia. It works with charities including Francis House Hospice in Manchester, Great Ormond Street Hospital, and ChildLine. In September 1997, West Heath School in Sevenoaks, Kent, United Kingdom, was placed into receivership. West Heath was the former school of Diana, Princess of Wales. Al-Fayed bought the school for £2.5 million in May 1998 and it became the new premises for the Beth Marie Centre for Traumatised Children, which had previously been based in Sevenoaks. The school reopened as The New School at West Heath in September 1998. In 2011, Mohamed Al-Fayed's daughter Camilla, who had worked as an ambassador for the charity for eight years, opened the newly refurbished Zoe's Place baby hospice in West Derby, Liverpool.

=== Fulham F.C. ===
Al-Fayed bought west London professional football club Fulham F.C. for £6.75 million in 1997. The purchase was made via Bill Muddyman's Muddyman Group. His long-term aim was that Fulham would become a Premier League side within five years. In the 2000–01 season, Fulham won the First Division under manager Jean Tigana, winning 101 points and scoring 90 goals, and were promoted to the Premier League. This meant that Al-Fayed had achieved his Premier League aim a year ahead of schedule. By 2002, Fulham were competing in European football, winning the Intertoto Cup and participating in the UEFA Cup. Fulham reached the 2010 UEFA Europa League final, which they lost to Atletico Madrid, and continued to play in the Premier League throughout Al-Fayed's tenure as owner, which ended in 2013.

Fulham temporarily left Craven Cottage while it was being upgraded to meet modern safety standards. There were fears that the club would not return to the Cottage after it was revealed that Al-Fayed had sold the first right to build on the ground to a property development firm.

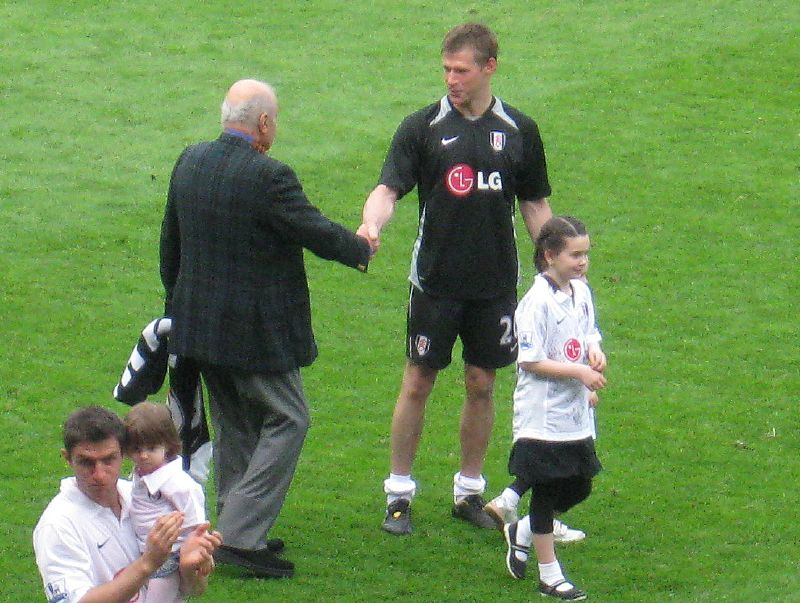
Al-Fayed congratulating Fulham goalscorer Brian McBride in May 2008

Fulham lost a legal case against former manager Tigana in 2004 after Al-Fayed had wrongly alleged that Tigana had overpaid more than £7m for new players and had negotiated transfers in secret. In 2009, Al-Fayed said that he was in favour of a wage cap for footballers, and criticised the management of The Football Association and Premier League as "run by donkeys who don't understand business, who are dazzled by money."

A statue of the American entertainer Michael Jackson was unveiled by Al-Fayed in April 2011 at Craven Cottage. In 1999, Jackson had attended a league game against Wigan Athletic at the stadium. Following criticism of the statue, Al-Fayed said "If some stupid fans don't understand and appreciate such a gift this guy gave to the world they can go to hell. I don't want them to be fans." The statue was taken down by the club's new owners in 2013; Al-Fayed blamed the club's subsequent relegation from the Premier League on the 'bad luck' brought by its removal. Al-Fayed then donated the statue to the National Football Museum. In March 2019, the statue was removed from the museum, with a spokesperson saying it had been planned for "several months" to introduce exhibits that "better represent" football; the removal followed accusations of child sexual abuse by Jackson in the documentary Leaving Neverland.

Under Al-Fayed, Fulham F.C. was owned by Mafco Holdings, based in the tax haven of Bermuda and in turn owned by Al-Fayed and his family. By 2011, Al-Fayed had lent Fulham F.C. £187 million in interest-free loans. In July 2013, it was announced that Al-Fayed had sold the club to Pakistani American businessman Shahid Khan, who owns the NFL's Jacksonville Jaguars.

== Business interests ==
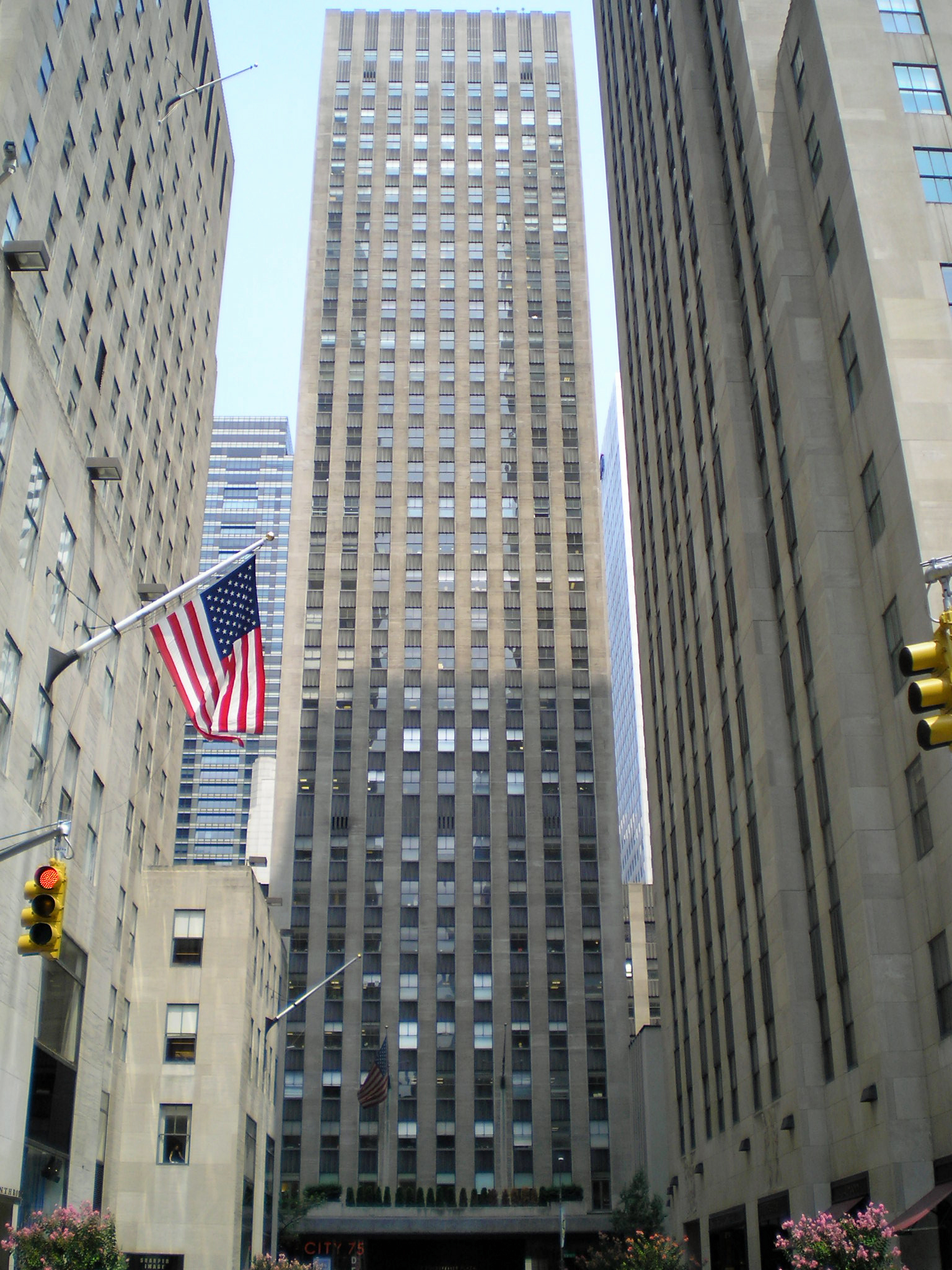
75 Rockefeller Plaza, New York

Al-Fayed's business interests included:

- Balnagowan Castle & Estates, Scottish Highlands
- 75 Rockefeller Plaza, New York City – built in 1947, originally the Esso Building, later the Time Warner Building; owned by Al-Fayed and managed and leased by RXR Realty

His major business purchases included:

- House of Fraser Group, including Harrods (1985, £615 million; sold 2010, £1.5 billion)
- Fulham Football Club (1997, £30 million; sold 2013 for between £150 and £200 million)
- After the death of Wallis Simpson, Fayed took over the lease of the Villa Windsor in Paris, the former home of the Duchess of Windsor and her husband, the Duke of Windsor, previously Edward VIII. Together with his valet Sydney Johnson, who had also been valet to the Duke, he organised the restoration of the villa and its collections.

=== Media interests ===
In 1996, Al-Fayed established Liberty Publishing, with the goal of the company stated as "to launch and acquire or take strategic interests in significant media businesses".

The chairman of Liberty Publishing was Stewart Steven, the former editor of the Evening Standard, with John Dux the chief executive, a former managing director of News International. Al-Fayed had failed in bids to buy the newspaper Today from Lonrho in 1986 and from News International in 1995. Al-Fayed believed that the British government had put pressure on Rupert Murdoch, CEO of News International not to sell the newspaper to him. Andrew Neil was recruited by Liberty Publishing, and helped agree a £4 million takeover of London News Radio. The takeover later collapsed.

Steven dined with Hugo Young, chairman of the Scott Trust at the Garrick Club, and offered a cheque for £17 million from Al-Fayed for The Observer newspaper. Young declined this offer, and another of £25 million. A women-only radio station, Viva Radio, was bought for £3 million in May 1996. Viva Radio was renamed Liberty Radio, and broadcast commentaries of Fulham F.C.'s home and away games. The station was sold to UCKG in 2000. Due to debts of £6.5 million, Liberty Publishing was wound down by Al-Fayed's brother, Ali, in 1996. Steven, Dux and Mike Hollingsworth were fired, but Andrew Neil was retained as a consultant.

=== Property ===
Al-Fayed owned 55 and 60 Park Lane, and a building on South Street, Mayfair. All three buildings were secretly connected to the Dorchester Hotel, which Al-Fayed purchased for Hassanal Bolkiah, the Sultan of Brunei.

In 1995, Westminster City Council believed that Hyde Park Residences, the company letting 170 luxury flats at 55 and 60 Park Lane, had been wrongly reporting the flats as let on long leases to avoid paying higher business rates due on short tenancies. The council demanded an additional £1.1 million, and Al-Fayed believed that the letting agent, Sandra Lewis-Glass had betrayed his confidence to the council. After bugging Lewis-Glass's telephone calls and placing her under surveillance, John McNamara, the head of Al-Fayed's security and a former Metropolitan Police officer, alleged to police that she had stolen two floppy disks worth 80 pence. Denying the accusation, Lewis-Glass was released without charge, and later sued for wrongful dismissal, winning £13,500.

In the early 1970s, Al-Fayed purchased the Castle St. Therese in the Parc de St Tropez on the French Riviera, a chalet in Gstaad, Switzerland, and Barrow Green Court and farm, near Oxted, Surrey.

In Bocardo SA v Star Energy UK the Supreme Court of the United Kingdom denied Al-Fayed compensation after an energy company, Star Energy, had drilled for oil under his Surrey estate. Al-Fayed originally won a share of the oil proceeds at the High Court, but was later told by appeal judges he could only claim damages. Bocardo SA was a company owned by Al-Fayed that owned his estates in Scotland and Surrey; it was based in Liechtenstein.

== Personal life ==
Fayed was married from 1954 to 1956 to Samira Khashoggi. He worked with his brother-in-law, Saudi Arabian arms dealer and businessman Adnan Khashoggi. In 1985, Fayed married the Finnish socialite and former model Heini Wathén, with whom he had four children, including Omar.

Sometime in the early 1970s, he began using the prefix al- (Arabic: ال) in his name, rendering his name in English as "al-Fayed" rather than simply "Fayed". In Arabic names, the word al-, in conjunction with the name of an ancestor, means family of or House of. This aristocratic prefix led to Private Eye magazine nicknaming him the "Phoney Pharaoh". His brothers Ali and Salah followed suit at the time of their acquisition of the House of Fraser in the 1980s, though by the late 1980s, both had backtracked on the practice. Max Hastings, the former editor of the Daily Telegraph, wrote that Al-Fayed had "harried" Conrad Black, the former owner of the Daily Telegraph, "in pursuit of his demand to be referred to in our newspaper as "Al Fayed". I sent the chairman a note, explaining that this was a long-running saga: "The Fayeds have been seeking for years to call themselves Al Fayed, just as a socially ambitious Frenchman might seek to style himself de Fayed, or a German von Fayed ... At one level, it is harmless if the Fayeds wish to call themselves kings of Sheba, but I always feel determined to demonstrate that we will not be threatened."

=== Death of Dodi Fayed ===
==== Background and relationship with Diana, Princess of Wales ====
Lady Diana Spencer married Charles, Prince of Wales, then heir apparent to the British throne in 1981, becoming Princess of Wales. She was an international celebrity and a frequent visitor to Harrods in the 1980s. Al-Fayed and Dodi first met Diana and Charles in July 1986 when they were introduced at a polo tournament sponsored by Harrods.

Diana and Charles divorced in 1996. She was hosted by Al-Fayed in the south of France in mid-1997, with her sons, Princes William and Harry. For the holiday, Fayed bought a 195 ft yacht, the Jonikal (later renamed the Sokar). Dodi and Diana later began a private cruise on the Jonikal and paparazzi photographs of the couple in an embrace were published. Diana's friend, the journalist Richard Kay, confirmed that Diana was involved in "her first serious romance" since her divorce.

Dodi and Diana went on a second private cruise on the Jonikal in the third week of August, and returned from Sardinia to Paris on 30 August. Later that day, the couple privately dined at the Ritz, after the behaviour of the press caused them to cancel a restaurant reservation. They planned to spend the night at Dodi's apartment near the Arc de Triomphe. In an attempt to deceive the paparazzi, a decoy car left the front of the hotel, while Diana and Dodi departed from the rear of the hotel in a Mercedes-Benz S280. The car was driven by the Ritz acting head of security Henri Paul. Five minutes later, the car crashed in the Pont de l'Alma tunnel. Dodi and Paul were found dead at this location; Diana died later in hospital. British bodyguard Trevor Rees-Jones, who sustained a serious head injury, was the sole survivor of the crash. Fayed arrived in Paris a day later and viewed Dodi's body, which was returned to the United Kingdom for an Islamic funeral.

==== Conspiracy theories ====
From February 1998, Al-Fayed maintained that the crash was a result of a conspiracy, and later contended that the crash was orchestrated by MI6 on the instructions of Prince Philip, Duke of Edinburgh. His claims were dismissed by a French judicial investigation, but Fayed appealed the verdict.

The British Operation Paget, a Metropolitan police inquiry that concluded in 2006, also found no evidence of a conspiracy. To Operation Paget, Al-Fayed made 175 "conspiracy claims".

An inquest headed by Lord Justice Scott Baker into the deaths of Diana and Dodi began at the Royal Courts of Justice, London, on 2 October 2007 and lasted for six months. It was a continuation of the original inquest that had begun in 2004.

At the Scott Baker inquest, Fayed accused the Duke of Edinburgh, the Prince of Wales, Lady Sarah McCorquodale, her sister, and numerous others, of plotting to kill the Princess of Wales. Their motive, he claimed, was that they could not tolerate the idea of the Princess marrying a Muslim.

Al-Fayed first claimed that the Princess was pregnant to the Daily Express in May 2001, and that he was the only person who had been told. Witnesses at the inquest who said the Princess was not pregnant, and could not have been, were part of the conspiracy according to Al-Fayed. Fayed's testimony at the inquest was roundly condemned in the press as farcical. Members of the British Government's Intelligence and Security Committee accused Fayed of turning the inquest into a 'circus' and called for it to be ended prematurely. Lawyers representing Al-Fayed later accepted at the inquest that there was no direct evidence that either the Duke of Edinburgh or MI6 were involved in any murder conspiracy involving Diana or Dodi. A few days before Al-Fayed's appearance, John MacNamara, a former senior detective at Scotland Yard and Al-Fayed's investigator for five years from 1997, was forced to admit on 14 February 2008 that he had no evidence to suggest foul play, except for the assertions Al-Fayed had made to him. His admissions also related to the lack of evidence for Al-Fayed's claims of the Princess's pregnancy and the couple's engagement.

The jury verdict, given on 7 April 2008, was that Diana and Dodi were "unlawfully killed" through the grossly negligent driving of Henri Paul, who was drunk, and the pursuing vehicles.

Al-Fayed's lawyers accepted that there was no evidence to support the assertion that Diana was illegally embalmed to conceal pregnancy, or that a pregnancy could be confirmed by any medical evidence. They also accepted that there was no evidence to support the assertion that the French emergency and medical services had played any role in a conspiracy to harm Diana. Following the Baker inquest, Al-Fayed said that he was abandoning his conspiracy campaign, and would accept the jury's verdict.

Journalist Dominic Lawson wrote in The Independent in 2008 that Al-Fayed sought to concoct "a conspiracy to cover up the true circumstances" of fatalities caused by the crash "involving an intoxicated and over-excited driver (an employee of Mohamed Fayed's Paris Ritz)". He "had remarkable success in persuading elements of the tabloid press, notably the Daily Express, to give the conspiracy a fair wind."

Al-Fayed financially supported Unlawful Killing (2011), a documentary film presenting his version of events. It was not formally released because of the potential for libel suits.

=== Nationality ===
Al-Fayed was born an Egyptian citizen, entered Haiti on a Kuwaiti passport, and left Haiti with a Haitian diplomatic passport with which he entered the United Kingdom in 1964. In 1970, Al-Fayed informed Mahdi Al Tajir that he and his brothers' Haitian diplomatic passports had expired, and their Egyptian passports made it difficult for them to obtain visas in many countries. Tajir secured Emirati passports for Al-Fayed, but not Emirati nationality. On the passport documents Al-Fayed had his date of birth changed from 1929 to 1933, making himself four years younger. His two brothers reduced their ages by ten years on their new passports.

The rulers of Dubai, the Al Maktoum family, had refused to renew the Fayeds' passports in 1993, and so they reverted to travelling on their original Egyptian passports. Mohamed and Ali Al-Fayed applied for British citizenship in early 1993. Ali's application was supported by Gordon Reece and Peter Hordern, and Mohamed's by Lord Bramall and Jeffrey Archer. The Al-Fayed brothers' application for British citizenship was rejected in December 1993, on the basis that the DTI report disqualified them from citizenship. Michael Howard, the Conservative home secretary, asked for the decision to be reviewed, fearing renewed embarrassment over his connections with alleged fraudster Harry Landy, which surfaced during the DTI investigation. The application was rejected again in February 1995, and in 1996 the High court declared that the home secretary could not deny, without explanation, the Al-Fayeds' citizenship requests. The Home Office later abandoned its appeal to the House of Lords against the High Court's decision.

In 1997, Jack Straw, the home secretary in the new Labour government, reconsidered the Al-Fayeds' citizenship request, but rejected Mohamed Al-Fayed's request in May 1999. Ali Al-Fayed had had his request for citizenship granted in March 1999.

The rejection was attributed to Al-Fayed's admitting that he bribed politicians and his breaking in to safety deposit boxes in Harrods. Al-Fayed described the decision as "perverse" and said he was a victim of the British establishment and "zombie" politicians.

=== Death ===
Al-Fayed died in London on 30 August 2023, aged 94. His cause of death was listed as old age and was announced on 1 September. He was buried that day at Barrow Green Court alongside Dodi, after a funeral service during Friday prayers at London Central Mosque.

== Sexual misconduct allegations ==
Al-Fayed has been accused by multiple women of sexual harassment and assault. Young women applying for employment at Harrods were often subjected to HIV tests and gynaecological examinations.

=== Early allegations ===
In "Holy War at Harrods", a 1995 profile of Al-Fayed for Vanity Fair, Maureen Orth described how, according to former employees, "Fayed regularly walked the store on the lookout for young, attractive women to work in his office. Those who rebuffed him would often be subjected to crude, humiliating comments about their appearance or dress... A dozen ex-employees I spoke with said that Fayed would chase secretaries around the office and sometimes try to stuff money down women's blouses". Al-Fayed sued Vanity Fair, resulting in a settlement with no damages paid, but requiring Vanity Fair to place all evidence in locked storage. Vanity Fair chose to settle in part out of sympathy for Diana's fatal crash.

In December 1997, the ITV current affairs programme The Big Story broadcast testimonies from former Harrods employees who spoke of how Al-Fayed routinely sexually harassed women in similar ways. Al-Fayed was interviewed under caution by the Metropolitan Police after an allegation of sexual assault against a 15-year-old schoolgirl in October 2008. The case was dropped by the Crown Prosecution Service when they found there was no realistic chance of conviction due to conflicting statements.

A December 2017 episode of Channel 4's Dispatches programme alleged that Al-Fayed sexually harassed three female Harrods employees, and attempted to "groom" them. One of the employees was aged 17 at the time. Cheska Hill-Wood waived her right to anonymity to be interviewed for the programme. The programme alleged Al-Fayed targeted young employees over a 13-year period.

Early media scrutiny of sexual misconduct allegations against Al-Fayed was curtailed by his frequent threats of litigation. Al-Fayed developed a reputation for spending large sums on litigation against media outlets reporting on sexual assault allegations against him. The lack of scrutiny was also attributed to the actions of Al-Fayed's security chief, John MacNamara, who allegedly threatened and surveilled potential witnesses and victims.

=== Sexual misconduct scandal ===
In September 2024, BBC News reported that more than 20 women who had worked at Harrods have alleged that Al-Fayed sexually assaulted them; five of these women accused him of raping them. Former manager of the women's club Fulham L.F.C., Gaute Haugenes said in September 2024 that to protect players from Al-Fayed they were not allowed to be left alone with him. He also said that members of staff were aware that he "liked young, blonde girls". A documentary, Al-Fayed: Predator at Harrods was broadcast on BBC Two which featured interviews with the women and explored evidence of the failure by Harrods to properly investigate the claims and the potential "cover-up" of abuse allegations. On 21 September 2024, Dean Armstrong KC, a barrister representing alleged victims, said his team had 37 clients, but that he had been contacted by 150 individuals with claims about Al-Fayed. On 26 September 2024, the Metropolitan Police said they would be exploring to see if anyone else should be pursued for criminal offences following the allegations made against Al-Fayed. On the same day, Harrods's managing director, Michael Ward, said Al Fayed "presided over a toxic culture of secrecy, intimidation, fear of repercussion and sexual misconduct".

By 26 September it was thought that around 200 women, who previously worked for Al Fayed, had spoken to investigators with claims of rape and sexual assault. In addition to reported sexual assault issues at Harrods, on 26 September sexual assault allegations were also made relating to Al-Fayed's ownership of Fulham FC between 1997 and 2013. On 27 September lawyers representing those making allegations against Al-Fayed said they were working with 60 women.

On 11 October the Metropolitan Police revealed that 40 new allegations, from 40 different people, including sexual assault and rape, had been made against Al-Fayed, covering a period between 1979 and 2013.

On 18 October, former Fulham Ladies F.C. captain Ronnie Gibbons said that she had been groped twice by Al Fayed and that he had forcefully tried to kiss her in his private office at the Harrods store in 2000, when she was 20 years old. By 21 October, Harrods announced that they were in the process of settling more than 250 claims for compensation brought by women who had alleged sexual misconduct by Al Fayed. By 31 October, 400 alleged victims or witnesses had presented themselves to lawyers concerning allegations of sexual misconduct. It was described, at the time, by a lawyer representing the Justice for Harrods Survivors group as "the worst case of corporate abuse of women the world has ever seen". Some women claimed that they had been sexually abused by both Al Fayed and his brother Salah, who died of pancreatic cancer in 2010.

In November 2024, it was found that the Metropolitan Police were told about allegations of sexual assault against Al Fayed ten years earlier than it had acknowledged. The Met had claimed that it first received such allegations in 2005. However, in 1995, the Met had received such allegations from Samantha Ramsay, who is now deceased. The BBC reported that "Samantha's family say the Met dismissed her claims. They believe that multiple women could have been saved from sexual abuse if the force had acted." The Met claimed that there was no history of Samantha's allegations on their computer system, "but that in 1995 some reports were paper-based and might not have been transferred." Ramsay's sister, Emma, recalled the police as having said at the time: "We've added it to a pile of other female names that we've got that have made the same complaint against Mohamed Al Fayed." The Metropolitan Police has said it is investigating more than five people it believes may have assisted or enabled Al Fayed's sexual offences. By the end of November 2024, the inquiry was looking into alleged offences between 1977 and 2014 with the youngest victim aged 13.

Al-Fayed's son, Omar, said that, in the light of the allegations, he was "horrified" and that they had "thrown into question the loving memory I had of (my father)". He also expressed his sorrow for the victims and stated that they "and public deserve full transparency and accountability".

On 13 August 2025, the BBC reported that 146 women and men came forward reporting about crimes regarding the Metropolitan Police's investigation. This is double the number reported back in October 2024. Harrods, that is now under new ownership, has offered victims, compensation of up to £385,000 and a formal apology for Mohammed Al Fayed's alleged crimes of the past. In March 2026 the Metropolitan Police said it had interviewed three women under caution on suspicion of aiding and abetting rape and human trafficking for sexual exploitation, and that 154 people had come forward to the investigation. Harrods allocated £62.3 million to a redress scheme, comprising £57 million for compensation and £5.3 million for legal and administrative costs. The scheme closed to new applications on 31 March 2026; by May 2026, 259 survivors had entered the process and more than 75 had received full compensation. In 2026 the Home Office recognised complainants as victims of human trafficking through the National Referral Mechanism, and the Independent Office for Police Conduct confirmed that one serving and four former Metropolitan Police officers were under investigation over the handling of the 2008 and 2013 inquiries.

In 2026, Charles, Earl Spencer mentioned in his book Swan Song that his sister Diana recounted with "revulsion" how, early in her relationship with Dodi Fayed, his father Mohamed had "dropped a hand onto her buttocks and squeezed them while saying in a leery, suggestive tone, 'And in Egypt, father-in-law gets first go…'".

== In media ==
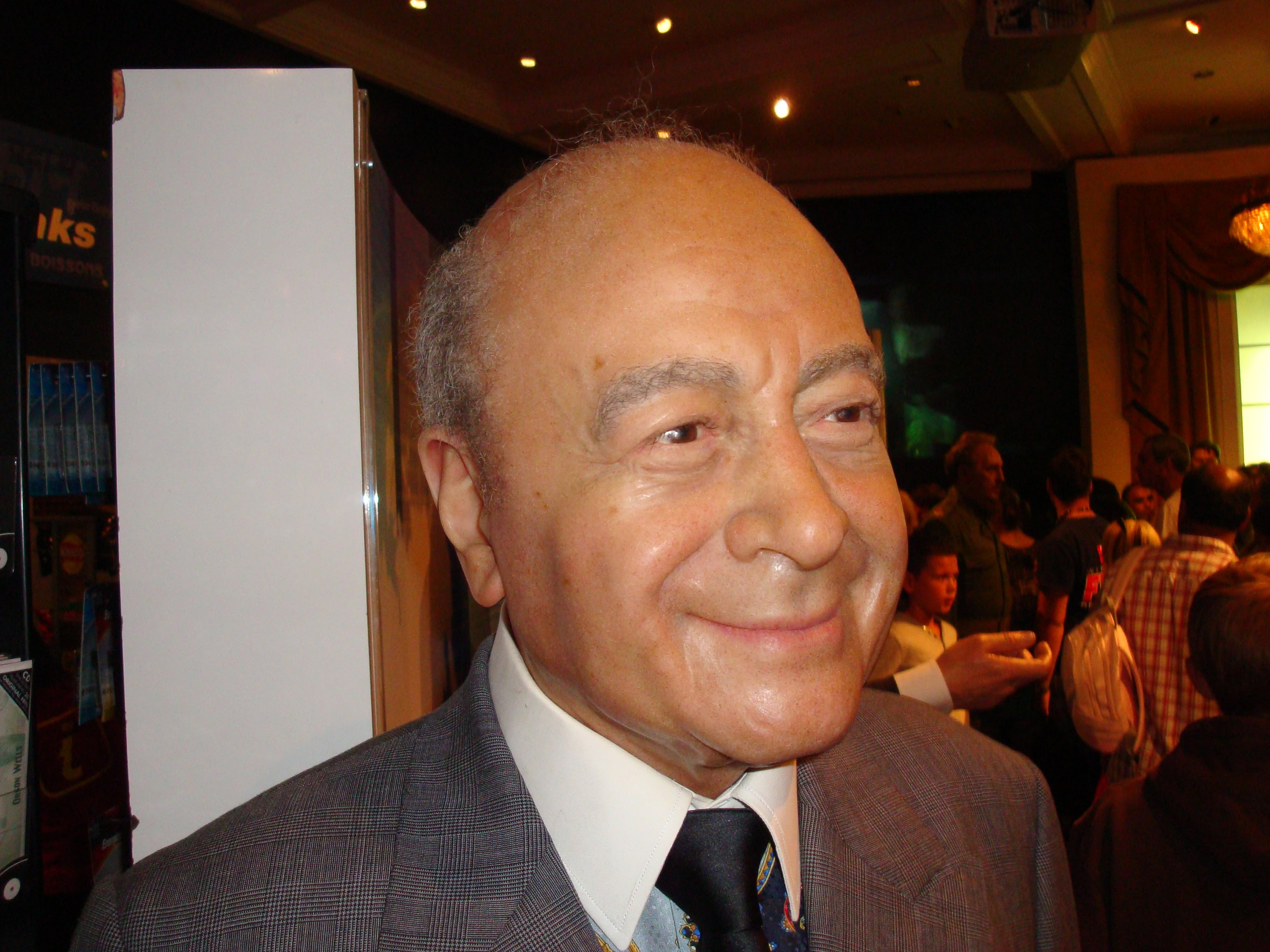
Wax sculpture of Al-Fayed, Madame Tussauds, London, July 2009

Al-Fayed appeared on an episode of Da Ali G Show in 2000, and the Howard Stern Show in 2007. Al-Fayed appeared on the 2011 edition of British Celebrity Big Brother, and set the housemates a task based on dressing up as ancient Egyptian mummies.

In the 2007 BBC sitcom Gavin & Stacey, Nessa recounts having a sexual relationship with Al-Fayed.

Al-Fayed was portrayed by Salim Daw in seasons 5 and 6 of The Crown. He expressed "deep sadness" and a connection to Al-Fayed upon the businessman's 2023 death.

== Bibliography ==
- Brooke, Henry; Aldous, Hugh Graham Cazalet (1988). House of Fraser Holdings Plc: Investigation Under Section 432 (2) of the Companies Act 1985: Report. H.M. Stationery Office. ISBN 978-0-11-514652-7.
