= Michael Cole (public relations) =

BBC journalist

- Born: 1943 (age 82–83)
- Occupations: Journalist; Royal Correspondent; Public relations spokesman
- Employers: BBC (1968–1988); Harrods (1988–1998)

Michael Dexter Cole (born March 1943) is a former BBC television journalist and royal correspondent. After leaving the BBC, he worked as director of public affairs for Harrods, and as the spokesman for its owner Mohamed Al Fayed.

== Journalism ==
Cole began his career in newspapers, before moving to television. After a period with the local news programme for Anglia Television, he worked on the BBC's Look East from the beginning of 1969. In 1973 he was one of three correspondents sent by the BBC to cover the Yom Kippur War from the Israeli side, his first assignment after becoming permanently based in London following brief periods in Northern Ireland. The reforms brought about by then BBC director-general Hugh Greene benefited news coverage according to Cole, but were accompanied by heavy drug use in some BBC departments.

Cole covered Margaret Thatcher's career following her election as Conservative Party leader in 1975, told her on camera that Airey Neave MP had been assassinated in 1979, and was on hand at the rescue of Norman Tebbit after the Brighton's Grand Hotel was bombed by the IRA in 1984.

=== Royal Correspondent ===
Cole served as a BBC Royal Correspondent. In 1987, Cole inadvertently revealed to a press correspondents' lunch some of that year's forthcoming Queen's Christmas message, apparently her reference to the Enniskillen bombing on Remembrance Day. According to Cole, he immediately told his employer what had happened, and found the "Cole the Mole" headlines which followed inappropriate. Cole's friend and fellow royal reporter James Whitaker, later said that Cole had spoken only in general terms and did not convey anything which was secret. The BBC apologised to the Queen for the lapse. Cole was not dismissed and was moved to a media and arts remit, remaining with the corporation for another 10 months.

== Later career ==
=== Mohamed Al Fayed ===
Cole first met Mohamed Al Fayed while working on a BBC programme about the Duke and Duchess of Windsor, The Uncrowned Jewels in 1987. He joined Harrods after leaving the BBC in 1988, telling journalist Nick Cohen days after the death of Diana, Princess of Wales that he loved Al Fayed like a father. However, Cole was also a victim of bugging because his boss did not trust many of his employees.

In 1997 Cole led negotiations to conclude a settlement to a libel action brought by Al Fayed against Vanity Fair. Al Fayed had sued the magazine following a 1995 article written by the U.K. editor Henry Porter which accused Al Fayed of racism, and covert surveillance of, and sexual misconduct against, Harrods' staff. The BBC returned to the allegations in 2024, following Al Fayed's death the previous year, in a documentary, Al-Fayed: Predator at Harrods which was broadcast on BBC Two. This led to reconsideration of the roles Cole, and other senior Harrods' staff, had played in allegedly enabling Al Fayed's sexual abuse.

Cole resigned from Harrods in 1998, taking early retirement at the age of 55. In 2008 he gave evidence to the inquest into the deaths in 1997 of Diana, Princess of Wales and Dodi Fayed, Mohamed Al Fayed's son.

=== Lecturing; public relations company ===
In 2012, he jointly delivered, with Vernon Bogdanor, a Commonwealth Parliamentary Association lecture, The Crown and the Commonwealth: An emblem of dominion or a symbol of free and voluntary association? at Westminster Hall, part of the Palace of Westminster.

He is the chair of Michael Cole & Company, his own public relations and broadcasting company. He has also written a column for the East Anglian Daily Times, and appeared in 1999 as a panellist on the BBC's satirical quiz, Have I Got News for You.
