= Mark Guiducci =

American editor

Mark Guiducci is an American editor currently serving as editorial director of Vanity Fair. He was previously the creative editorial director at Vogue.

== Early life and education ==
Guiducci grew up in San Diego. He is a 2010 graduate of Princeton University, where his thesis adviser "encouraged us to analyze clothes as much as any other part of an artwork."

== Career ==
After graduating from Princeton University, Guiducci was hired as a features associate by Vanity Fair in 2010, and he became arts editor for Vogue in 2012. In 2017, he left Vogue to take the reins of Garage magazine as editor in chief, then returned to Vogue in 2020 where he was named creative editorial director. In June 2025, Guiducci was appointed global editorial director of Vanity Fair, taking up the position at the end of the month.

In an August 2025 memo, Guiducci announced that Vanity Fair will be shifting its coverage away from "news aggregation, reviews, and trade coverage" and focus more on "money, politics, and style."
