= Alexander Vlahos =

Welsh actor, writer and director

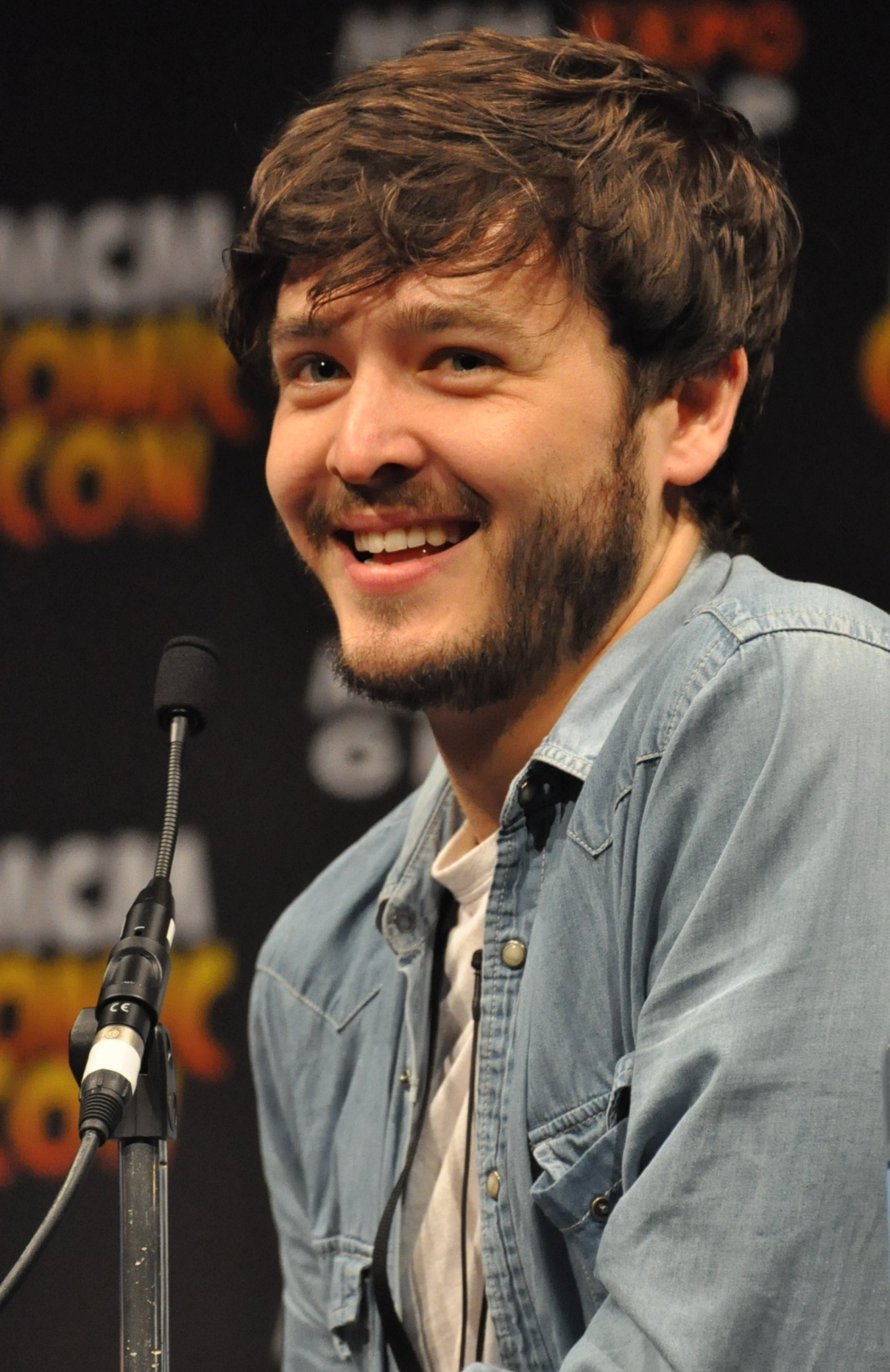
- Vlahos in 2013
- Born: 30 July 1988 (age 38); Tumble, Carmarthenshire, Wales
- Education: Royal Welsh College of Music & Drama
- Occupations: Actor; writer; director
- Years active: 2008–present
- Spouse: Julie van Rhijn (m. 2022)
- Children: 1

Alexander Vlahos (born 30 July 1988) is a Welsh actor, writer, and director best known for playing Philippe, Duke of Orléans, in the Canal+ television series Versailles. In 2012, Vlahos took the role of the adult Mordred, in the final series of the BBC One drama Merlin.

== Early life ==
Vlahos was born in Tumble, Carmarthenshire, before moving to Llantrisant, Mid Glamorgan. He is the son of a Greek father and a Welsh mother, and speaks both Welsh and English. He played ice hockey from ages eight to 18; for the Cardiff Devils, Great Britain and captained Wales. His love for the sport derives from watching the Mighty Ducks as a young child and he remains a fan of the media franchise. He trained in acting at the Royal Welsh College of Music & Drama in Cardiff, graduating in 2009.

== Career ==
He first appeared in the BBC Wales drama Crash in 2009, portraying Dylan. The following year, he appeared in the daytime medical soap opera Doctors in a week-long storyline entitled "Master of the Universe," in which he played the lead role of Lewis Cutler. The episodes were then nominated for "Best Single Episode" and "Spectacular Scene of the Year" at the British Soap Awards in 2010. Also in 2010, he appeared in both Pen Talar and The Indian Doctor, and the film Bright Lights.

In 2012, he earned the role of Private Keenan in Privates, a mini-television series about conscripts in the National Service set in the 1960s, for which he shaved his head. He also played the part of Mordred in series five of Merlin, a role originally played by Asa Butterfield in the first two series.

From 2012 to 2016, he played the role of Dorian Gray in Big Finish Productions' audio series The Confessions Of Dorian Gray. He has also written one of the episodes, "The Mayfair Monster," released in October 2013, and the audio play, HMS Surprise for the Bernice Summerfield box set New Frontiers, which was released in April 2013.

From 6 December 2013, Vlahos appeared in Fortune's Fool at The Old Vic. Mike Poulton's adaptation of Turgenev's play was directed by Lucy Bailey, in a new production which starred Iain Glen and Richard McCabe.

In July 2015, it was announced that he would be playing Bertie Potts in the mini audiobook series The Diary of River Song set in the Doctor Who universe, alongside Alex Kingston.

Since 2015, he portrayed Louis XIV's brother, Philippe I, Duke of Orléans, in the Franco-Canadian historical television series Versailles, about life at the French court, The first series premiered in November 2015. Series 2 was filmed in early 2016 and explores the lighter side to Philippe, the first time for Vlahos to portray a rather light-hearted character for an extended period of time. On 14 September 2016, producer Claude Chelli confirmed that Versailles has been renewed for a third season, which began filming in April 2017. In March 2018, Vlahos confirmed that the third season would also be Versailles' final one.

In the 2016 docudrama Barbarians Rising, a global co-production for The History Channel, Vlahos played the Roman emperor Valentinian in one episode. He also portrayed the Romanian philosopher and mathematician Maurice Solovine in one episode of Genius, National Geographic Channel's first scripted series.

From 11 February to 11 March 2017 in London, Vlahos starred La Ronde, directed by Max Gill, which was a modernised, gender-neutral version of the play by Arthur Schnitzler. A cast of four played the 10 characters randomly selected onstage every night by a roulette wheel. In the 2017 Big Finish Productions audio drama Hamlet, Vlahos played the title character.

In summer 2018, Vlahos played Romeo in Romeo and Juliet, and Catesby in Richard III at the Shakespeare's Rose Theatre in York, before returning to the Park Theatre in London to portray Captain Hook and Mr Darling in a stage production of Peter Pan.

Vlahos played the artist, Charles Lockhart, in the PBS show Sanditon which aired in 2022–2023.

He will be appearing in the Netflix movie, Irish Wish, in 2024.

== Personal life ==
In 2023, he revealed that he has been diagnosed with attention deficit hyperactivity disorder. Vlahos married Julie van Rhijn in February 2022. They had a second ceremony that May. In February 2024, the couple welcomed a son named River.

== Filmography ==
List of film performances
Title	Year	Role	Notes
Bright Lights	2010	Steff	Short film
Truth or Dare	2012	Luke	Also known in the United States as Truth or Die
Button Eyes	2013	Boy	Short film
The Head Hunter	2016	Herbert Mullin	
Irish Wish	2024	Paul Kennedy	
Firecracker	2024	Tom	
Cuori di Sale			

List of television performances
Title	Year	Role	Notes
Crash	2009–2010	Dylan	
Doctors	2010	Lewis Cutler	Recurring role
All Shook Up!	2010	Dafydd Hibbard	
Pen Talar	2010	Iolo	3 episodes
The Indian Doctor	2010	Tom Evans	Main role
The Tower	2011	Tom	Television film
Merlin	2012	Mordred	Recurring role
Privates	2013	Private Keenan	Recurring role
Versailles	2015–2018	Philippe I, Duke of Orléans	Main role
Barbarians Rising	2016	Valentinian III	1 episode
Prisoner Zero	2016	Zero	Voice
Genius	2017	Maurice Solovine	1 episode
Death in Paradise	2020	Max Newman	1 episode
Bang	2020	Dai	3 episodes
Outlander	2022-2023	Allan Christie	Recurring role
Sanditon	2022	Charles Lockhart	Recurring role

List of films directed
Title	Year	Notes
Lola	2020	Short film
Watchtower	2021	Short film
Here We Are	2022	Short Film
Bright World: So It Goes	2022	Music Video, Won Best Music Video at the International Film Festival of Wales

== Audiobooks ==
List of audio series and audiobooks
Title	Year	Producer	Role	Notes
Gallifrey	2011	Big Finish Productions		Season 4
The Confessions of Dorian Gray	2012-2016, 2019, 2020, 2022	Big Finish Productions	Dorian Gray	Seasons 1-5 and specials
Bernice Summerfield	2012	Big Finish Productions	Gray	Box set 3 "Legion"
Bernice Summerfield	2013	Big Finish Productions		Writer of "HMS Surprise" from Box set 4 "New Frontiers"
The Diary of River Song	2015	Big Finish Productions	Bertie Potts	Season 1
Doctor Who - The Lives of Captain Jack	2017	Big Finish Productions	The Stranger	
Hamlet	2017	Big Finish Productions	Hamlet	
These Old Shades	2021	Audible/Penguin		
The War Master	2022	Big Finish Productions	Dorian Gray	Season 8 Escape From Reality, Episode 4 "The Master of Dorian Gray"

== Theatre ==
Title	Year	Role	Director/Theatre
Fortune's Fool	2013	Pavel Yeletsky	Lucy Bailey
Macbeth	2013	Malcolm	Kenneth Branagh
La Ronde	2017	Various	Max Gill
Romeo and Juliet	2018	Romeo	Shakespeare's Rose Theatre
Richard III	2018	Catesby	Shakespeare's Rose Theatre
Peter Pan (play)	2018	Hook	Park Theatre
