= Jack Fox (actor) =

British actor (born 1985)

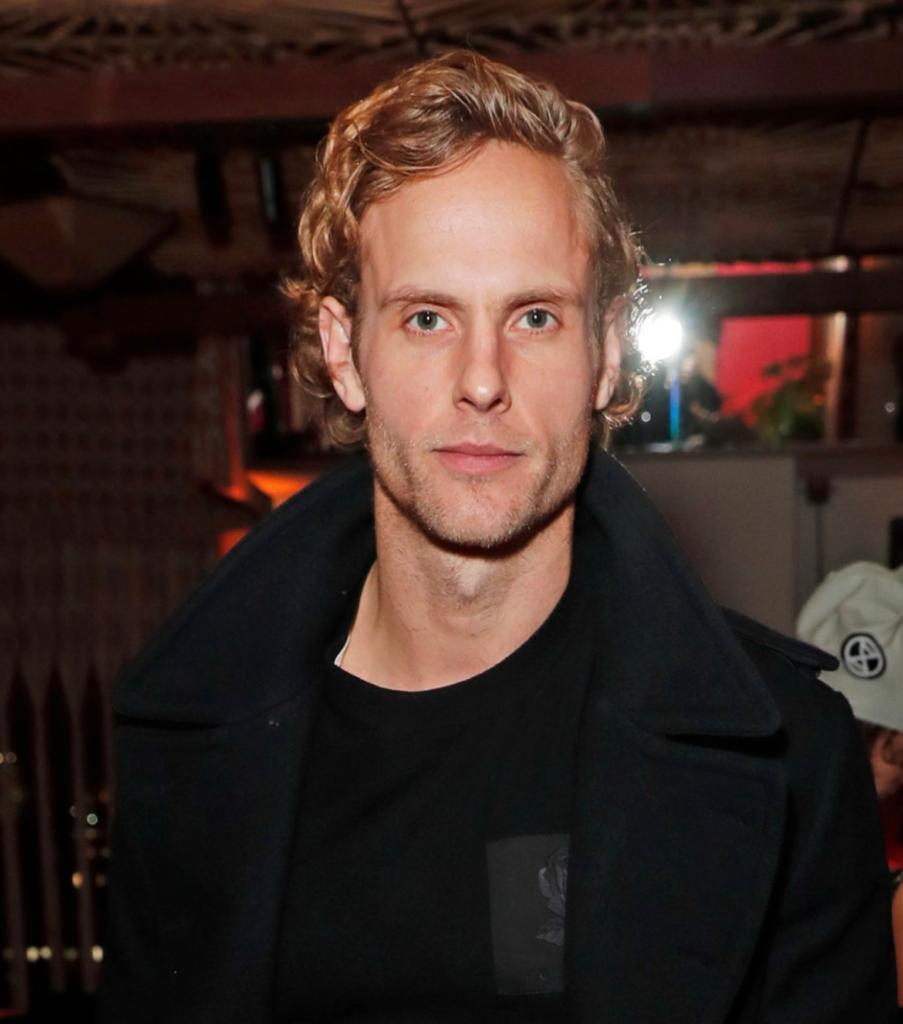
- Born: Jack Louis Fox; 17 September 1985 (age 41); London, England
- Education: The King's School, Canterbury; University of Leeds
- Occupation: Actor
- Years active: 2009–present
- Parent(s): James Fox; Mary Piper
- Family: Fox

Jack Louis Fox (born 17 September 1985) is a British actor.

Fox began his career in television starring in the Fresh Meat (2011). Roles in the Golden Globe-nominated National Geographic series Genius, BBC One’s Privates, Upstart Crow, NBC's Dracula, ITV’s Mr. Selfridge, Lewis, Midsomer Murders, and Crackle’s Snatch followed. He played a leading Role in Sky Atlantic's Riviera (2019), which smashed records for their biggest debut series ever, making it their most downloaded show in history. He played a lead role in Andrew Davies's ITV/Masterpiece (PBS) produced Sanditon (2020–2023). He appeared in the second season of BBC One's drama Cheaters (2024).

His film work includes the Oscar-nominated BAFTA winning feature Theeb, Johnny English, The Messenger, Kids in Love, Blood Moon.

Fox made his West End debut opposite his father, James Fox, in Dear Lupin (UK Tour, West End).

== Early life ==
Fox is a member of a family of distinguished actors. He was born to actor James Fox and Mary Elizabeth Piper on 17 September 1985 in London. His brother is actor Laurence Fox. He is the nephew of producer Robert Fox and the actor Edward Fox, who is the father of actors Emilia and Freddie.

He went to preparatory school at the Milbourne Lodge School, and then attended The King's School, Canterbury, and the University of Leeds, for which he received 2:1 honours in philosophy and theology.

== Career ==
After his graduation in 2009, Fox's first professional role was playing Perkin Warbeck in Channel 4’s TV Mini Series, Henry VIII: Mind of a Tyrant. His next role was to be found in ITV’s Lewis, in which he played the guest lead character of Alfie Wilkinson, opposite Kevin Whatley. In 2011, Fox was cast opposite Edmund Kingsley in Pierre Granier-Deferre’s Beast, in which he turned heads as the frightening and capable Robert. He then went onto star in Aml Ameen’s written and directed Hoorah, a military PTSD thriller. At the end of 2011, Fox was then cast in Channel 4’s critically acclaimed Fresh Meat, created by Jessie Armstrong and Sam Bain, in which he demonstrated his comedic touch, playing Ralph, a manipulative counterweight to Jack Whitehall’s JP, in an arc that spanned two seasons. A leading role in BBC One’s Privates, followed, in which he played the malevolent Private White-Bowne, directed by Brynn Higgins. At the start of 2013, Fox was then cast in NBC’s Dracula, as the expert swordsman Alastair Harvey, before moving onto ITV’s Mr. Selfridge.

In 2014 Fox made his stage debut, taking on the title role in Oscar Wilde's Dorian Gray at the Riverside Studios, where his performance was described by WhatsOnStage as "a revelation," with the critic noting, "Jack Fox brings a fresh, vibrant interpretation to the role, managing to capture Wilde's wit and complexity with ease, making the character's internal conflict both poignant and humorous" He was then cast by Naji Abu Nowar in Theeb, the story of a young Bedouin boy as he experiences a greatly hastened coming-of-age, as he embarks on a perilous desert journey to guide a British officer, played by Fox, to his secret destination. The film was a roaring success gaining Naji Abu Nowar the Venice Horizon's Award, collecting multiple accolades on the way to two BAFTA wins, and an Oscar Nomination.

Film Roles in The Messenger, directed by BAFTA winning director David Blair, and Kids in Love opposite Will Poulter and Cara Delevingne followed, before returning to television to work on the Golden Globe-nominated National Geographic series Genius opposite Geoffrey Rush. Fox was then cast in Ben Elton’s Upstart Crow opposite David Mitchell, before moving onto Working Title's Jonny English Strikes Again opposite Rowan Atkinson.

In the summer of 2015 Fox made his West End debut at the Apollo theatre in London. The two-hander named Dear Lupin, adapted by Michael Simkins from author Charlie Mortimer’s smash hit of the same name, was directed by Philip Franks. In which Fox starred opposite his father. The play was a huge success, with The Evening Standard giving it four stars, noting his "comedic timing" Additionally, The Stage commended the production for its "sharp wit and genuine warmth," crediting Fox's role in delivering "a compelling blend of humour and heartache"

In 2019 Fox was cast in Sky Atlantic's Riviera (2019), starring opposite Juliet Stevenson, Will Arnett, and Julia Stiles which smashed records for their biggest debut series ever. He played Nico Eltham, a psychopathic megalomaniac, bringing a "chilling sophistication" to the role that The Telegraph noted for its "mesmerising intensity" with his portrayal being met with widespread acclaim. Critics praised his performance as "one of the standout elements of the series." with The Independent highlighting Fox's ability to convey complexity, stating, "Jack Fox excels in making Nico Eltham a character to both fear and, in some peculiar way, root for," leading to him being the cover star for Rollacoaster's Autumn/Winter 2020 edition. He then moved onto Andrew Davies's ITV/Masterpiece (PBS) produced Sanditon (2019-2023), in which he played manipulative and narcissistic Edward Denham, opposite Theo James and Rose Williams, the show was critically acclaimed and spanned three seasons. His portrayal was described as "delightfully scheming yet captivating," adding vitality to the series. The Radio times lauded him for bringing "a delightful scheming energy to the series," embodying the character with a "vibrant blend of charm and ambition" with Collider commententing on his contribution to the show, saying, "Fox's portrayal of Edward Denham adds a necessary layer of tension and intrigue, with a performance that is both calculated and charismatic,"

In 2021, a return to comedy-drama followed, this time in a new format, eighteen ten-minute episodes, produced by Clerkenwell Films and directed by Elliot Hegarty. Cheaters would see him work with Josh Maguire, Susan Wokoma, and Callie Cooke, in this acclaimed comedy. The Guardian described his role as "refreshingly honest and layered," stating, "Fox delivers a performance that makes the character's moral ambiguity both compelling and credible," The success of the show lead to it being nominated for a Royal Television Society award.

At the start of 2022, he began production on Óskar Þór Axelsson’s Operation Napoleon, a film based on Arnaldur Indriðason's best selling book of the same name. He stars alongside Iain Glen, Wotan Wilke Möhring, and Ólafur Darri Ólafsson.

In 2024 Fox began work on Cheaters season 2, which was released later on in the year. Following on from the success of the first season the show was once again received well by critics, with The Guardian noting, "Jack Fox brings a nuanced blend of charm and vulnerability to his character, making the show's exploration of infidelity and personal growth both engaging and poignant," Due to the popularity of the show, there have been calls for further series, but there has been no official announcement thus far.

== Filmography ==
Year	Title	Role	Notes
2009	Henry VIII: The Mind of a Tyrant	Perkin Warbeck	Episode: Prince 1485–1509
2010	Lewis	Alfie Wilkinson	Episode: Your Sudden Death Question
2011	Beast	Robert	Short
2011–2013	Fresh Meat	Ralph	7 episodes
2012	Hoorah	Dennis	Short
2013	Privates	Private White-Bowne	TV Mini-Series
2013	Theeb	Edward	
2013	Dracula	Alastair Harvey	3 episodes
2014	Mr Selfridge	Jeremy	Episode: #2.3
2014	Blood Moon	Wade	
2015	The Messenger	Mark	
2016	Kids in Love	Lars	
2016	Level Up	Steve	
2017	Snatch	Beanie the Mixologist	
2017	Genius	Dr. Paul Weyland	
2017	Upstart Crow	Valentine	
2017	The Dark Side of the Sun	Charlie	
2018	Johnny English Strikes Again	Geoffrey	
2019	Riviera	Nico Eltham	14 episodes
2019–2023	Sanditon	Sir Edward Denham	20 episodes
2019	Midsomer Murders	Jude Deddington	
2022-2024	Cheaters	Zack	18 episodes
2023	Operation Napoleon	Steve Rush	
