= Diana: Last Days of a Princess =

Television Film

Genevieve O'Reilly on the DVD cover

Diana: Last Days of a Princess is a television movie broadcast in the United States by TLC on 12 August 2007 and subsequent dates. It also has aired on Five, UKTV History and UKTV Drama in the United Kingdom, RTÉ in Ireland, ProSieben in Germany, TF1 in France, RTP in Portugal, Channel 7 in Australia, Channel One in Russia, Jim in Finland and the History Channel in India.

The film purports to be a fairly accurate (albeit semi-fictionalized) account of the last two months in the life of Diana, Princess of Wales, leading up to her death on 31 August 1997. It is a mix of scripted scenes, actual news footage, and recent interviews with some of the principals present during the period portrayed, including Mohamed Al-Fayed and editors from The Sunday Mirror, giving it a hybrid drama-documentary feel. Much of Jenny Lecoat's teleplay is based on testimony found in the 800-page Paget Report, published in 2006 by the United Kingdom's Metropolitan Police Service following a four-year-long investigation.

Richard Dale directed a cast that includes Genevieve O'Reilly as Diana, Patrick Baladi as Dodi Al-Fayed, and Shaun Dooley as Al-Fayed family security guard Trevor Rees-Jones, Nadim Sawalha as Mohamed Al-Fayed, and Carlo Ferrante as Henri Paul, the driver of the car in which he, Diana, and Dodi were killed during a high-speed escape from paparazzi through the streets of Paris.

Halton House in Wendover, Buckinghamshire, UK, served as the backdrop for scenes taking place at the Hôtel Ritz Paris. Other film locations included Hertfordshire, Paris (including the Pont de l'Alma Tunnel in which the car crashed) and Cannes.

== Cast ==
- Genevieve O'Reilly as Diana, Princess of Wales
- Patrick Baladi as Dodi Al-Fayed
- Carlo Ferrante as Henri Paul
- Shaun Dooley as Trevor Rees-Jones
- Nadim Sawalha as Mohamed Al-Fayed
- James Barriscale as Kez Wingfield
