= Ordeal by Innocence (TV series) =

TV series

- Genre: Mystery; Drama; Thriller
- Based on: Ordeal by Innocence by Agatha Christie
- Screenplay by: Sarah Phelps
- Directed by: Sandra Goldbacher
- Starring: Bill Nighy; Anthony Boyle; Anna Chancellor; Morven Christie; Crystal Clarke; Christian Cooke; Alice Eve; Matthew Goode; Ella Purnell; Eleanor Tomlinson; Luke Treadaway
- Theme music composer: Stuart Earl
- Country of origin: United Kingdom
- Original language: English
- No. of episodes: 3

Production
- Executive producers: Basi Akpabio; James Prichard; Sarah Phelps; Karen Thrussell; Damien Timmer; Helen Ziegler; Gaynor Holmes
- Producer: Roopesh Parekh
- Cinematography: John Lee
- Running time: 57 minutes
- Production companies: Mammoth Screen; Agatha Christie Limited

Original release
- Network: BBC One
- Release: 1 April – 15 April 2018

Ordeal by Innocence (titled on-screen as Agatha Christie's Ordeal by Innocence) is a three-part television drama series that was first broadcast in April 2018 on BBC One. It is based on the Agatha Christie novel of the same name and is the third English-language filmed version to be broadcast. The drama stars Morven Christie, Bill Nighy, Anna Chancellor, Alice Eve and Eleanor Tomlinson amongst others.

The show was originally intended to be broadcast as part of the BBC Christmas programming but was held back due to original cast member Ed Westwick being accused of sexual assault. The accusation was denied and no charges were ultimately brought. The actor's scenes were later reshot, with Christian Cooke taking Westwick's place.

The series attracted positive reviews despite some backlash over the changes made to the plot. The direction and styling were afforded particular praise. The series was released on DVD through Universal Pictures UK on 11 March 2019.

== Synopsis ==
Wealthy heiress Rachel Argyll is found bludgeoned to death in her palatial home where she lives with her husband, Leo; their five adopted children Mary, Mickey, Jack, Tina, and Hester; and their maid, Kirsten Lindstrom. Jack is arrested for the crime as his fingerprints are found on the presumed murder weapon, but is killed in jail before he can stand trial.

Eighteen months later, Leo is set to marry his secretary Gwenda Vaughn, much to his children's dismay. A man named Arthur Calgary arrives and says he has an alibi for Jack: he had given him a lift at the time of the murder. Calgary claims to have been working in the Arctic since the murder and only just learned about it. Leo calls him a charlatan, and Mickey threatens him. Calgary is later approached by Mary's husband, Philip Durrant, who has become embittered towards the Argylls after being paralyzed in a car crash, and suggests they work together to extort money from the family. Calgary rejects his offer but promises to clear Jack's name. Flashbacks reveal that Rachel was a cruel and unloving mother who alienated her children, giving all of them a motive to murder her.

When Calgary returns to the Argyll estate, a car tries to run him down. The car crashes, killing the driver, Bellamy Gould, the police detective who investigated Rachel's murder. Calgary meets Leo and admits that he had lied about his background. He was a scientist who had worked on the atomic bomb and suffered a mental breakdown from guilt. On the night of the murder, Calgary had escaped from a mental asylum and was recaptured after giving Jack a lift. Calgary says that he saw another car on the road that night.

Durrant, who has antagonized many of the family members, is murdered by an injected overdose of morphine; his body is discovered next day by Leo and Calgary.

Flashbacks show the events leading up to Rachel's murder. Jack, in an attempt to goad his mother, had confronted her with the fact that Mickey and Tina had become lovers. In turn she had disclosed to him that Kirsten was his biological mother and Leo his father. Rachel had discovered Leo having sex with Gwenda and threatened to divorce him, and he had bludgeoned her to death with one of his Egyptian statuettes. Bellamy Gould helped to frame Jack out of revenge for Jack's affair with his wife. To prevent Jack from revealing the truth about his parentage, Leo and Bellamy conspired to have him killed before he could stand trial.

Back in the present, Calgary is taken back to the mental hospital on Leo's recommendation. Kirsten and the children confront Leo with their knowledge of his crime. Leo disappears, and the police drag a local lake looking for his body. The Argyll siblings visit Calgary at the mental hospital while Kirsten checks on Leo, imprisoned in the family's bomb shelter.

== Cast ==
- Bill Nighy as Leo Argyll, father, Rachel's husband and later engaged to Gwenda
- Anthony Boyle as Jack Argyll, son and accused murderer
- Anna Chancellor as Rachel Argyll, (Note: Catherine Keener was originally cast in the role of Rachel Argyll.) mother and murder victim
- Morven Christie as Kirsten Lindstrom, housekeeper
- Crystal Clarke as Tina Argyll, daughter
- Christian Cooke as Mickey Argyll, (Note: Ed Westwick was originally cast in the role of Mickey Argyll.) son
- Alice Eve as Gwenda Vaughn, former secretary engaged to Leo
- Matthew Goode as Philip Durrant, Mary's husband
- Ella Purnell as Hester Argyll, daughter
- Eleanor Tomlinson as Mary Durrant, daughter and Philip's wife
- Luke Treadaway as Doctor Arthur Calgary, Jack's potential alibi
- Brian McCardie as Bellamy Gould, chief detective
- Luke Murray as young Jack
- Hayden Robertson as young Hester
- Catriona McNicholl as young Mary
- Abigail Conteh as young Tina
- Rhys Lambert as young Mickey
- Frances Grey as Lydia Gould, Bellamy's wife
- Sammy Moore as Clive
- Sandy Welch as Doctor Edwin Morsuch
- Sandy Batchelor as Simon
- Stuart McQuarrie as Doctor
- Alexandra Finnie as young Kirsten

Changes in cast

== Production ==
The mystery drama was adapted for the screen by Sarah Phelps who was behind the previous two Christie adaptations for the BBC over the Christmas period (And Then There Were None and The Witness for the Prosecution). Phelps acknowledged changing some elements of the story, particularly the ending, and when asked about what the purists might think, she responded "I don’t give a bollocks about people saying it has to be pure. No, it doesn’t. If you want a pure adaptation, go and get someone else to do it."

The three-parter was filmed in, and around, the town of Inverkip in the Inverclyde district west of Glasgow. Ardgowan House was used as the Argyll family home of Sunny Point.

The series was originally intended to have been broadcast over the Christmas and New Year holidays of 2017/2018, but was cancelled due to the sexual assault allegations against Westwick. Its broadcast over the Eastertide of 2018 split the series into three episodes across three weeks which led to some dubbing it "ordeal by iPlayer".

== Reshoots ==
After the drama had completed filming, the actor playing the part of Mickey Argyll (Ed Westwick) was accused of sexual assault in 2014. In the wake of other sexual assault scandals in 2017, the BBC decided to delay the broadcast pending an investigation into the allegations against Westwick.

Ultimately, the BBC auditioned a new actor and re-shot Westwick's part with Christian Cooke. The BBC explained that as Ridley Scott had already done something similar with All the Money in the World (replacing Kevin Spacey with Christopher Plummer), they had decided to re-shoot too because, as they described it, "hundreds and hundreds of hours of people's hard earned work would have been lost". Westwick strenuously denied the allegations.

Forty-five minutes of footage from 35 scenes was shot over 12 days with Christian Cooke. The other actors in the production were drafted in and whilst most made the time, (one production personality described them all as very busy actors), not all of them were on set together at the same time. Alice Eve, who played Gwenda Vaughn, could not make it back from America and had to be split-screened into the new footage. The actor Christian Cooke praised the production staff in getting things organised so quickly and, apart from one scene where Cooke's character has icy breath (in what was supposedly mid-summer), most critics agreed that the re-shoot went very well and that the production was "seamless".

== Episodes ==
No.	Title	Directed by	Written by	Original release date
1	"Episode 1"	Sandra Goldbacher	Sarah Phelps	1 April 2018
2	"Episode 2"	Sandra Goldbacher	Sarah Phelps	8 April 2018
3	"Episode 3"	Sandra Goldbacher	Sarah Phelps	15 April 2018

== Reception ==
Lucy Mangan, writing in The Guardian, gave the first episode a maximum of five stars saying "The latest adaptation, rich, dark, adult and drawing on a backdrop of postwar grief and instability, are a far cry from the sunny – still murderous, but sunny – uplands scattered with millet seed for Joan Hickson to peck at as Miss Marple".

Michael Hogan, writing in The Sunday Telegraph, gave the episode four stars out of a possible five saying that "initially, it was ponderous and confusing, with time-hops and a wide cast of characters", but that later "the pace steadily picked up [and] by the end of the hour, this whodunit had its hooks into me". Also in The Sunday Telegraph, Ed Cumming described the series as "taut writing" but questioned the necessity for three episodes. He also noted that "everyone was so unlikeable".

The Times gave the first episode four stars out of five and noted that in spite of the production having to have 35 scenes re-shot with new actor Christian Cooke, the production was seamless. Similarly, the second episode was awarded four stars out of five. The reviewer lamented that the series had been "eked out over three weeks instead of a fortnight" but had described the episode as "rattling along rather nicely". Special mention was made of Matthew Goode who "...didn't just steal every scene he was in, he convinced us that the scene belonged to him in the first place". The third episode also garnered four stars out of five from The Times. Carol Midgley said the ending where Leo Argyll ended up being locked away in the bunker by Kirsten, "unexpected". She also said that the plot was "overboiled" and did not show whether the "Argyll children were in on it, or did they think he'd drowned?". Midgley liked it overall and said that "apart from those final shark-jumping moments, I relished every other dark, delicious thing that the writer Sarah Phelps did to the story".

The Radio Times reported that viewer feedback was positive although some had commented that the programme was confusing due to its forwards and backwards time jumps. Others criticised its soundtrack music and accused the male characters of looking too similar to each other.
