= Shaun Dooley =

British actor

- Education: Arden School of Theatre
- Years active: 1997–present
- Spouse: Polly Dooley (m. 1998)
- Children: 4

Shaun Dooley is an English actor, narrator and voice-over artist.

== Early life and education ==
Dooley attended Barnsley Youth Theatre in 1989 before going on to study at the Arden School of Theatre in Manchester between 1992 and 1995.

== Career ==
Dooley's first acting role was as Shaun in Groove on a Stanley Knife in 1997. He later played Ritchie Fitzgerald in Coronation Street from 1997 until 1998. He appeared occasionally in EastEnders as Tom Stuart between 2001 and 2004. He appeared in Series 1 of The Street. He had a role in P.O.W..

Dooley played Peter Harper in BBC drama series The Street. He also featured in the 2007 television docudrama Diana: Last Days of a Princess. Dooley portrayed Kieran in the British horror film Salvage. He portrayed police inspector Dick Alderman in all three parts of the Red Riding trilogy and in 2017 appeared as Reverend Michaelmas Winter in the Sky 1 drama Jamestown. Among his many voiceover roles, Dooley narrates the Discovery Channel series Gold Rush for its UK broadcast.

In 2019, Dooley and his wife Polly produced an album, Got It Covered, for Children in Need.

== Recognition and honours ==
Dooley received an honorary master's degree from Leeds Arts University in July 2025.

== Filmography ==
=== Film ===
Year	Title	Role	Notes
1997	Groove on a Stanley Knife	Shaun	Short film
2005	Pitch Perfect	Ellis	Short film
2006	Ex Memoria	Martin, carer	Short film
2007	The Mark of Cain	Corporal Gant	
2008	Eden Lake	Jon	Celador Films
2009	The Appointment	Karl	Short film
2009	Salvage	Kieran	
2009	Kandahar Break: Fortress of War	Richard Lee	
2011	The Awakening	Malcolm McNair	
2011	Junkhearts	Josh	
2012	Rachael	Dad	Short film
2012	The Woman in Black	Mr. Fisher, village innkeeper	Hammer Films
2012	Peekaboo	Andy	Short film
2012	Offender	Jackie Nash	
2014	The Karman Line	Dave	Short film
2014	Cowboy Ben	Cowboy Ben	Short film
2014	Blood Moon	Calhoun	
2014	Devil Makes Work	Devil	Short film
2017	Blood Shed	Jack	Short film
2018	Pond Life	Russ Buckfield	
2019	Official Secrets	John, Internal Security	
2019	The Corrupted	Eamonn McDonagh	
2023	Saltburn	Jeff Quick	
2023	The Toxic Avenger	Melvin Ferd (The Crusading Reporter)	
2024	Tyger	Neil	
2024	The Can	Adam	
2024	The Lord of the Rings: The War of the Rohirrim	Freca (voice)	
2025	Stay Calm	Stuart	Short film

=== Television ===
Year	Title	Role	Notes	Ref.
1997–1998	Coronation Street	Richie Fitzgerald	12 episodes	
1997–1998	Casualty	Fire Officer	Episodes: "The Golden Hour" & "Internal Inferno: Parts 1 & 2"	
1998	The Grand	Heckler	Series 2; episode 2	
1998	Dalziel and Pascoe	Robert Pascoe	Episode: "The Wood Beyond"	
1999	Peak Practice	Paramedic 2	Episode: "Race Against Time"	
1999	Warriors	Pte. John Hookway	Mini-series; 2 episodes	
2000	Holby City	Tom Gold	Series 3; episode: "Anyone Who Had a Heart"	
2001–2004	EastEnders	Reverend Tom Stuart	32 episodes	
2002	Shackleton	Hubert Hudson	Mini-series; 2 episodes	
2002	Plain Jane	PC Graham	Television film	
2002	Silent Witness	Paul Preston	Series 6: episodes: "The Fall Out: Parts 1 & 2"	
2002	P.O.W.	Brown	6 episodes	
2004	Foyle's War	Gordon Drake	Episode: "Enemy Fire"	
2005	The Royal	Martin Tomlinson	Episode: "It's What's on the Inside That Counts"	
2005	Holby City	Dave Wilson	Series 7; episode: "The Honeymoon Is Over"	
2005	New Tricks	Rick Mayo	Episode: "Family Business"	
2005	Murphy's Law	DC Ollington	Episodes: "The Goodbye Look", "Boy's Night Out" & "Hard Boiled Eggs and Nuts"	
2005	Vincent	Malcolm	Series 1; episode 3	
2005	Child of Mine	Simon	Television film	
2005	The Ghost Squad	Barry Mills	Episode: "Heroes"	
2006	Rosemary & Thyme	Becker	Episode: "Three Legs Good"	
2006	The Bill	Harvey Taylor	Episode: "A Day to Remember"	
2006	Vital Signs	Rob Glover	Series 1; episode 1	
2006	The Street	Peter Harper	Episodes: "The Accident" & "Stan"	
2006	Coming Up	Steve	Episode: "Heavenly Father"	
2006	Strictly Confidential	Gary Shelton	Series 1; episode 3	
2007	Mobile	DI George Fleming	Mini-series; episodes: "The Engineer", "The Soldier" & "The Boss"	
2007	Diana: Last Days of a Princess	Trevor Rees-Jones	Television film	
2008	Harley Street	Nick Marsh	Series 1; episode 2	
2008	Midsomer Murders	Mark Purdy	Series 11; episode: "Left for Dead"	
2008	Silent Witness	DI Adam Tranfield	Series 12; episodes: "Terror: Parts 1 & 2"	
2008	Apparitions	Liam	Mini-series; 2 episodes	
2008	Stovepipe	Lead role	HighTide's production at the West 12 Shopping Centre in Shepherd's Bush	
2009	Red Riding	Dick Alderman	Television film trilogy: "Red Riding 1974", "Red Riding 1980" & "Red Riding 1983"	
2009	Law & Order: UK	Jack Gilmore	Episode: "Love and Loss"	
2010	Five Days	Sgt. Don Parker	Series 2; 5 episodes	
2010	Married Single Other	Eddie	6 episodes	
2010	The Road to Coronation Street	Derek Bennett	Television film	
2010	Inspector George Gently	Darren Paige	Episode: "Gently Evil"	
2010	Moving On	Anthony	Episode: "Skies of Glass"	
2010	Accidental Farmer	Matt	Television film	
2011	Hustle	Cool Hand Cooper	Episode: "The Delivery"	
2011	South Riding	Mr. Holly	Mini-series; 3 episodes	
2011	Exile	Mike Eldridge	Mini-series; 3 episodes, alongside John Simm	
2011	Sugartown	Jason Burr	3 episodes	
2011	Postcode	Dean	2 episodes	
2011	The Borrowers	Robert Millman	Television film	
2011	Great Expectations	Joe Gargery	Mini-series; 3 episodes	
2012	Benidorm	Pete Garvey	Series 5, episode 3	
2012–2013	Misfits	Greg	Series 4 & 5; 16 episodes	
2013	Common Ground	Porno Bri	Episode: "Rupert"	
2013	The White Queen	Sir Robert Brackenbury	Mini-series; episodes: "The King Is Dead", "The Princes in the Tower" & "The Final Battle"	
2014	Our World War	Fred Firth	Mini-series; episode: "War Machine"	
2014	Wolfblood	Alexander 'Alex' Kincaid	Series 3; 6 episodes	
2014	The Game	DC Jim Fenchurch	Mini-series; 6 episodes	
2015	Broadchurch	Rickie Gillespie	Series 2, 6 episodes	
2015	Ordinary Lies	Dave	Episode: "Beth's Story"	
2015	This Is England '90	Mr. Lewis	Mini-series; episode: "Autumn"	
2015	Cuffs	DC Carl Hawkins	Mini-series; 8 episodes	
2016	Hoff the Record	Greg	Episode: "Wedding"	
2016	DCI Banks	Steve Richards	Series 5; 5 episodes	
2016	CBeebies Bedtime Stories	Himself - Storyteller	3 episodes	
2017	Jamestown	Reverend Michaelmas Whitaker	7 episodes	
2017	Gunpowder	Sir William Wade	Mini-series; 3 episodes	
2018	Doctor Who	Epzo	Episode: "The Ghost Monument"	
2018	Doctor Who Access All Areas	Himself - Guest	1 episode	
2019, 2021, 2025	The Witcher	King Foltest of Temeria	5 episodes	
2019, 2022	Gentleman Jack	Jeremiah Rawson	Series 1 & 2; 7 episodes	
2020	The Stranger	Doug Tripp	Mini-series; 8 episodes	
2021	It's a Sin	Clive Tozer	Mini-series; 5 episodes	
2021	Innocent	DCI Mike Braithwaite	Main role. Series 2; 4 episodes	
2021	Grantchester	Johnny Richards	Series 6; 4 episodes. DI Geordie Keating's fellow ex-prisoner-of-war	
2021	The Great British Bake Off	Himself - Contestant	Episode: "The Great Christmas Bake Off"	
2023	Black Mirror	Len Fisher	Episode: "Demon 79"	
2023	The Long Shadow	DCS Chris Gregg	Mini-series; 1 episode	
2023	Midsomer Murders	Eli Trask	Series 24; episode: "Book of the Dead"	
2023–2025	Changing Ends	Graham Carr	Series 1–3; 18 episodes	
2024	Mr Bates vs The Post Office	Michael Rudkin	Mini-series; 3 episodes	
2024	Vera	Matthew McSwain	Episode: "Tender"	
2024–present	Criminal Record	DS Kim Cardwell	Series 1 & 2; 16 episodes	
2025	Grace	Terrence Maxwell	Episode: "Find Them Dead"	

=== Narration ===
In addition to his acting work, Dooley has provided voice-overs for numerous film and TV documentaries, including:

Year	Title	Notes
2010	Gazza's Tears: The Night That Changed Football	ITV4 film
2010–2011	Britain's Underworld	National Geographic series; 6 episodes
2012	When Life Means Life	TV series
2012	Revealed	Channel 5 series; episode: "Nazi Temple of Doom"
2012	Space Dive	BBC documentary on the record-breaking skydive by Felix Baumgartner (UK version)
2012	Our War	Series 2. BBC documentary series on the war in Afghanistan as seen by the British Army soldiers
2013	Hillsborough - Never Forgotten	BBC TV Special
2013–2018	Speed with Guy Martin	Channel 4 series; 15 episodes
2014	The Miners' Strike and Me	ITV film
2014	Life and Death Row	BBC documentary series; episode: "Crises Stage"
2014	Tsunami: Survivors' Stories	ITV1 film
2014	Web of Lies	Series 1. Discovery Communications crime documentary series. The series was originally called Evil Online
2014–2017	Edge of Alaska	Discovery Channel reality TV series; 18 episodes
2015	Our Guy in India	Channel 4 mini-series; 2 episodes
2015	Richard III: The Princes in the Tower	Channel 4 TV film
2015	Strangeways: Britain's Toughest Prison Riot	BBC TV film
2015	Wastemen	BBC series; 3 episodes
2015	The Detectives	BBC series following Greater Manchester Police over the course of multiple investigations of serious crime; 3 episodes
2015	Panorama	BBC series; episode: "NHS: The Perfect Storm"
2015	Wild Space	Short film
2015	The Gift of Life	Channel 5 series; 3 episodes
2015	Guy Martin: The Last Flight of the Vulcan Bomber	Channel 4 TV film
2015	Our Guy in Latvia	Channel 4 TV Special
2015	The Force: Manchester	Sky 1 series which follows officers of Greater Manchester Police
2015–2023	SAS: Who Dares Wins	Channel 4 series; 45 episodes
2016	Abused: The Untold Story	BBC One TV film
2016	Sydney Harbour Patrol	Discovery Channel series; 2 episodes
2017	Idris Elba: Fighter	Discovery Channel mini-series
2017	Everest Rescue	Discovery Channel mini-series; 6 episodes
2017	American Justice	BBC Two series which follows prosecutors and cop in Jacksonville, Florida; 3 episodes
2017	The Detectives: Murder on the Streets	BBC Two documentary series shadowing members of Greater Manchester's Murder Investigation Team; 4 episodes
2017	Guy Martin WW1 Tank	Channel 4 TV film
2017	Guy Martin vs. The Robot Car	Channel 4 TV film
2017	Blitz: The Bombs That Changed Britain	BBC Two series; 4 episodes
2018	Four Days That Shook Britain	ITV documentary film which covers the four terrorist attacks of 2017, in England
2018	Our Guy in Russia	Channel 4 mini-series; 3 episodes
2018	Daydream Believers	Film
2018	Guy Martin: The World's Fastest Van?	Channel 4 TV film
2018–present	Surgeons: At the Edge of Life	BBC Two series; 28 episodes
2019	One Day in Gaza	BBC TV film
2019	Guy Martin: World's Fastest Tractor	Channel 4 TV film
2019	Railroad Australia	Quest documentary which covers the highs and lows of drivers and engineers of Australian freight and tourist trains
2019–2023	When Missing Turns to Murder	Netflix true crime documentary series; 20 episodes
2019–present	Celebrity SAS: Who Dares Wins	Channel 4 series; 55 episodes
2020–2021	Guy Martin's Best Bits	Channel 4 mini-series; 4 episodes
2021	Guy Martin's Battle of Britain	Channel 4 mini-series; 2 episodes
2021	Yellowstone Supervolcano: The Next Pompeii	Channel 5 TV film (UK version)
2021	Guy's Garage	Channel 4 mini-series; 4 episodes
2021	Guy Martin's Lancaster Bomber	Channel 4 TV film
2021	Extreme Ice Railroad	ITV series
2021	Gold Rush	Discovery Channel series
2022	Stolen: Catching the Art Thieves	BBC TV series; 3 episodes
2023	Guy Martin's Great British Power Trip	Channel 4 mini-series; 3 episodes
2023	Our Guy in Columbia	Channel 4 two-part documentary
2023–2025	Special Forces: World's Toughest Test	Fox series; 18 episodes
2024	Guy Martin's Lost WW2 Bomber	Channel 4 TV film
2024	Guy Martin: Top Gun	Channel 4 TV film
2024	Guy Martin: Arctic Warrior	Channel 4 mini-series; 2 episodes
2025	Our Guy in Vietnam	Channel 4 mini-series; 2 episodes
2025	Guy Martin: The British Train That Changed the World	Channel 4 TV Special
2025	Timberborn	Video game trailer
2026	Guy Martin's House Without Bills	Channel 4 TV Special

=== Radio ===
Year	Title	Role	Notes	Ref.
2009	Right Place, Wrong Time	Alan	BBC Radio 4 drama	
2015	The Farthest Shore	Ged	Judith Adams's adaptation of Ursula Le Guin's novel for Radio 4	

=== Video games ===
Year	Title	Role (voice)	Notes
2022	Elden Ring	Yura / Shabriri / Fire Giant / Kaiden Sellswords	
2022	Xenoblade Chronicles 3	Gray	English version
2024	Still Wakes the Deep	Roy	
