= Luc Chikhani =

French oral and maxillofacial surgeon

- Occupations: Oral and maxillofacial surgeon, researcher
- Known for: Rebuilding the face of Trevor Rees-Jones

Luc Chikhani is a French oral and maxillofacial surgeon best known for reconstructing the face of Trevor Rees-Jones, the former bodyguard of Dodi Fayed, after the car crash that killed Diana, Princess of Wales, Dodi Fayed, and their driver, Henri Paul. He was interviewed in Rees-Jones's book The Bodyguard's Story.

He is currently Consultant Maxillofacial Surgeon, Department of Maxillofacial Surgery, Teaching Pitié-Salpêtrière Hospital, Paris, France.

He has performed research on sialorrhea (excessive salivation), and has written about cosmetic use of botulinum toxin.

== Books ==
- Hervé Bozec; Luc Chikhani (2003). Ellipses (ed.). ORL stomatologie. La DCEM en questions-réponses (in French). p. 142. ISBN 978-2-7298-1539-4.
- Moriarty, Kate; Chikhani, Luc (2004). Toxine botulique: manuel d'utilisation en esthétique faciale (in French). Elsevier. ISBN 978-2-84299-657-4.
