= Cheaters (British TV series) =

2022 British television series

- Genre: Comedy; Sitcom
- Written by: Oliver Lyttleton
- Starring: Susan Wokoma; Joshua McGuire; Callie Cooke; Jack Fox
- No. of seasons: 2
- No. of episodes: 26

Production
- Production company: Clerkenwell Films

Original release
- Network: BBC One
- Release: 15 February 2022 – 3 December 2024

Cheaters is a British short-form sitcom first broadcast on BBC One in February 2022.

The first series, originally created for BBC Three by Oliver Lyttleton, consists of 18 10-minute episodes, broadcast as triple-features. The plot revolves around an adulterous couple and their paramours.

The second series consists of eight 15-minute episodes and was released on 19 November 2024 on BBC One, with all episodes available to view on BBC iPlayer.

== Cast and characters ==
=== Main ===
- Susan Wokoma as Fola
- Joshua McGuire as Josh
- Callie Cooke as Esther
- Jack Fox as Zack

=== Recurring ===
- Shiloh Coke as Georgia
- Andrea Valls as Nina
- Bronwyn James as Natalie (series 1)
- Tobi Bamtefa as Rohan (series 1)
- Glenn Wrage as Tim Regan (series 1)
- Jay Lycurgo as Paul (series 1)
- Victoria Broom as Karen (series 1)
- Adam Ayadi as Damien (series 1)
- Olumide Olorunfemi as Tiwa (series 2)
- Ceallach Spellman as Lars (series 2)
- Margaret Cabourn-Smith as Monica (series 2)
- Jason Thorpe as Eddie (series 2)

== Production ==
The cast includes Susan Wokoma, Joshua McGuire, Jack Fox and Callie Cooke. Guests include Jim Norton.

== Release ==
Cheaters premiered on BBC One on 15 February 2022.

In Australia, the series premiered on 10 HD based in Sydney and Melbourne.

The second series premiered on BBC One on 19 November 2024 with all episodes available on BBC iPlayer.

== Reception ==
Jack Seale of The Guardian gave the first series 4 out of 5 stars.
