= Sanditon (TV series) =

British television series

- Genre: Historical drama
- Based on: Sanditon by Jane Austen
- Developed by: Andrew Davies
- Starring: Rose Williams; Theo James; Anne Reid; Kris Marshall; Jack Fox; Crystal Clarke; Charlotte Spencer; Kate Ashfield; Leo Suter; Ben Lloyd-Hughes; Alexander Vlahos; Tom Weston-Jones
- Composer: Ruth Barrett
- Country of origin: United Kingdom
- Original language: English
- No. of series: 3
- No. of episodes: 20

Production
- Running time: 60 minutes
- Production company: Red Planet Pictures

Original release
- Network: Britbox; PBS; ITV
- Release: 25 August 2019 – 24 April 2023

Sanditon is a British historical drama television series adapted by Andrew Davies from an unfinished manuscript by Jane Austen and starring Rose Williams, Crystal Clarke, Theo James, and Ben Lloyd-Hughes. Set during the Regency era, the plot follows a young and naive heroine as she navigates the new seaside resort of Sanditon.

Due to the unfinished nature of the novel, the original work was used for the majority of the first episode, and then Davies used the developed characters to complete the story. The novel is set in a seaside town during a time of social change. At the time of her death in 1817, Austen had completed 24,000 words of the novel, amounting to eleven chapters together with part of a twelfth.

The series first aired on ITV in the United Kingdom on 25 August 2019 in eight parts, and in the United States on 12 January 2020 on PBS, which supported the production as part of its Masterpiece anthology. A second and third series were commissioned in May 2021, as part of a collaboration between PBS and BritBox, with ITV acquiring the series for later linear broadcast (i.e., broadcast programming; compare, OTT).

== Overview ==
=== Series 1 ===
A chance accident brings Charlotte Heywood to Sanditon, a seaside resort on the cusp of dramatic change. Spirited and unconventional, Charlotte is initially keen to experience everything the town has to offer but is then shocked by its scheming and ambitious inhabitants and intrigued by the secrets they share. When Charlotte is tactlessly forthright about the family of enthusiastic entrepreneur Tom Parker, she immediately clashes with his handsome but wild younger brother Sidney. Amidst the rival suitors and unexpected danger, can Charlotte and Sidney see past each other's flaws and find love?

=== Series 2 ===
Nine months on from Charlotte's dramatic exit from Sanditon, the seaside town is growing in popularity and brimming with lively characters, romance and intrigue. Charlotte soon attracts the attention of two new suitors, while Georgiana Lambe is determined to get up to mischief in the name of love. Tom Parker strives to rebuild Sanditon, while the secrets and lies of the dysfunctional Denhams continue to rock the foundations of Sanditon.

=== Series 3 ===
Accompanied by her fiancé, Charlotte returns to a thriving Sanditon as Georgiana prepares to celebrate her 21st birthday. During the festivities, Charlotte has an awkward reunion with Alexander Colbourne, bringing unresolved feelings and questions to the surface. Meanwhile, Georgiana faces an unexpected challenge and receives support from unlikely allies.

== Cast ==
=== Main ===
- Rose Williams as Charlotte Heywood
- Kate Ashfield as Mary Parker
- Crystal Clarke as Georgiana Lambe
- Turlough Convery as Arthur Parker
- Jack Fox as Sir Edward Denham
- Kris Marshall as Tom Parker
- Anne Reid as Lady Denham
- Lily Sacofsky as Clara Brereton (Series 1-2)
- Charlotte Spencer as Esther, Lady Babington née Denham (Series 1-2)

==== Series 1 ====
- Theo James as Sidney Parker
- Alexandra Roach as Diana Parker
- Matthew Needham as Mr. Crowe
- Mark Stanley as Lord Babington
- Leo Suter as James Stringer

==== Series 2 ====
- Maxim Ays as Captain William Carter
- Frank Blake as Captain Declan Fraser
- Rosie Graham as Alison Heywood
- Ben Lloyd-Hughes as Alexander Colbourne
- Alexander Vlahos as Charles Lockhart
- Tom Weston-Jones as Colonel Francis Lennox

==== Series 3 ====
- Sophie Winkleman as Lady Susan de Clermonte
- Liam Garrigan as Samuel Colbourne
- Emma Fielding as Lady Montrose
- Edward Davis as Henry "Harry" Montrose, the Duke of Buckinghamshire
- Alice Orr-Ewing as Lady Lydia Montrose
- Cai Brigden as Ralph Starling
- James Bolam as Rowleigh Pryce

=== Recurring cast ===
- Kevin Eldon as Mr. Hankins
- Adrian Scarborough as Dr. Fuchs
- James Atherton as Fred Robinson
- Sophie Winkleman as Susan, Lady Worcester, later Lady de Clemont
- Jack Brady as Mr. Howard
- Isobel Hawkridge, Molly Bishop, Isaac Vincent-Norgate as the Parker children: Alicia, Jenny and Henry

==== Series 1 ====
- Elizabeth Berrington as Mrs. Griffiths
- Mollie Holder as Phillida Beaufort
- Rob Jarvis as Isaac Stringer
- Jyuddah Jaymes as Otis Molyneux
- Ruth Kearney as Eliza Campion
- Kayleigh-Paige Rees as Julia Beaufort

==== Series 2 ====
- Sandy McDade as Miss Beatrice Hankins
- Flora Mitchell as Leonora “Leo” Colbourne
- Eloise Webb as Augusta Markham
- Flo Wilson as Mrs. Wheatley

=== Guest cast ===
- Sarah Belcher as Mrs. Heywood
- Clinton Blake as Sam Sidaway
- Liz May Brice as Mrs. Harries
- Jon Foster as Beecroft
- Adrian Rawlins as Mr. Heywood
- Tessa Stephens as Young Alison Heywood

== Episodes ==
=== Series overview ===
Series	Episodes	Originally released	
Series	Episodes	First released	Last released
1	8	25 August 2019	13 October 2019
2	6	20 March 2022	24 April 2022
3	6	19 March 2023	24 April 2023

=== Series 1 (2019) ===
No.	Episode	Directed by	Written by	Original release date	U.K viewers (millions)
1	Episode 1	Oliver Blackburn	Andrew Davies	25 August 2019	5.37
When a coach accident introduces Charlotte Heywood to the Parker family, she quickly seizes the opportunity to throw herself into the adventure she has craved by returning with them to Sanditon, a seaside resort that Tom Parker is developing. Charlotte, however, soon discovers that the inhabitants of the town behave in curious and unpredictable ways that she could never have imagined.
2	Episode 2	Oliver Blackburn	Andrew Davies	1 September 2019	4.52
Charlotte and Sidney Parker clash again, only for Charlotte to be left confused by a chance encounter. Tensions surround Miss Georgiana Lambe's arrival at Lady Denham's grand pineapple luncheon as she is black. Sir Edward and Esther Denham realise that Clara Brereton poses a significant threat to their ambitions.
3	Episode 3	Oliver Blackburn	Andrew Davies & Justin Young	8 September 2019	4.14
Charlotte sets out to avoid Sidney, until a serious accident forces them together, and to reappraise each other. When Tom Parker brings a new doctor to the town, he and Lady Denham clash, while Clara makes a bold move in her bid to outplay Edward and Esther.
4	Episode 4	Lisa Clarke	Justin Young	15 September 2019	3.83
The arrival of Georgiana's forbidden love causes Charlotte to question her opinion of Sidney. Meanwhile, Clara witnesses a moment between Esther and Edward that raises her suspicions about their relationship, with devastating consequences for Esther.
5	Episode 5	Lisa Clarke	Andrea Gibb	22 September 2019	N/A
Tensions between Tom and his labourers erupt during the Sanditon cricket match. Charlotte and Sidney continue to clash, resulting in Georgiana being placed in terrible danger, while Lord Babington offers Esther a glimpse of a better future.
6	Episode 6	Lisa Clarke	Justin Young	29 September 2019	3.74
Charlotte and Sidney find themselves at loggerheads, but must work together in an attempt to rescue an abducted Georgiana. Tom tries to save Sanditon and his marriage. As Lady Denham falls gravely ill, Edward and Clara enter into a scandalous arrangement to finally get their hands on her inheritance. Charlotte begins to see Sidney in a new light, and vice versa.
7	Episode 7	Charles Sturridge	Justin Young	6 October 2019	3.87
As the Sanditon summer regatta approaches, Sidney wrestles with his feelings towards Eliza Campion, his former sweetheart, and Young Stringer reveals his feelings to Charlotte. With Lady Denham at death's door, the tensions between Edward, Clara and Esther finally come to a head - with surprising consequences.
8	Episode 8	Charles Sturridge	Andrew Davies	13 October 2019	TBC
On the night of the Midsummer Ball, romantic interests are resolved. However, a fire leaves Tom on the verge of bankruptcy. Sidney tells Charlotte that, in order to save the Sanditon project and his brother's fortunes, he plans to marry Eliza Campion in order to acquire her wealth.

=== Series 2 (2022) ===
Series (Season) 2 and 3 were commissioned by the U.S. Public Broadcasting Service (PBS) for its Masterpiece anthology series. Season 2 premiered on 20 March 2022 in the US and Series 2 was broadcast from 22 July 2022 in the UK.

No.	Episode	Directed by	Written by	Original release date	U.S. viewers (millions)
1	Episode 1	Charles Sturridge	Andrew Davies and Justin Young	20 March 2022	N/A
A funeral takes place in Antigua. Charlotte Heywood returns to Sanditon eight months after her original visit. This time she is accompanied by her sister Alison. Sanditon has grown a lot since her last visit, there is excitement when a regiment of soldiers come to town and Georgiana is turning down fortune-hunting suitors daily. Meanwhile, Esther is staying with her aunt to get some sea air when Edward unexpectedly returns.
2	Episode 2	Charles Sturridge	Colin Bytheway	27 March 2022	N/A
Charlotte has decided not to marry and begins a new job as a governess for Mr. Colbourne, a reclusive widower. She struggles to form a relationship with her charges, Colbourne's daughter and niece. Edward is working hard to try to prove he has changed, but Esther and his aunt remain suspicious. Meanwhile, Colonel Lennox throws a dinner party for the town, during which Charles Lockhart, an eccentric artist, tries to gain Georgiana's attention.
3	Episode 3	Charles Sturridge	Janice Okoh	3 April 2022	N/A
Tom Parker is getting ready for Sanditon's annual fair amidst rumours that the soldiers have not been paying their debts in town. Charlotte continues her job as governess for Mr. Colbourne, working hard to gain the respect of his niece and daughter. Clara's return has Esther and Lady Denham suspicious of her true intentions. Charles Lockhart continues to try to woo Georgiana while Alison Heywood is being pursued by two handsome soldiers, although she favours Captain Carter.
4	Episode 4	Ethosheia Hylton	Ellen Talyer	10 April 2022	N/A
Lady Denham throws her annual garden party for all the villagers of Sanditon, which ends sourly for Colonel Lennox, Mr. Colbourne, and Charlotte. Colonel Lennox behaves badly in his dealings with Tom Parker and tells Charlotte that he had been close to Colbourne's wife but Colbourne had ruined her. Charles Lockhart continues to work on gaining Georgiana's trust and has begun painting her, while Alison is losing trust in Captain Carter. Meanwhile, the relationship between Esther and Clara is growing closer while Edward tries to take advantage of Clara's situation.
5	Episode 5	Ethosheia Hylton	Robin French	17 April 2022	N/A
The Sanditon ball takes place, and Captain Lennox's dealings with Tom are causing trouble with the villagers. Georgiana and Charles Lockhart have become closer, while Alison is unsure of her feelings. Mr. Colbourne and his girls have shown significant improvement, and Charlotte discovers the truth about his marriage and his wife's relationship with Lennox. Meanwhile, Edward and Clara continue their scheme to make Esther believe she is going mad.
6	Episode 6	Ethosheia Hylton	Andrew Davies	24 April 2022	N/A
Georgiana and the Parkers learn the true reason Sidney was in Antigua. Alison prepares to go back home disappointed in her search for a husband, but finally realises that Captain Fraser is in love with her. Clara confesses to her role in Edward's schemes against Esther and Lady Denham, and Esther realises her husband's letters have been concealed from her. Charlotte discovers secrets about the Colbourne family.

=== Series 3 (2023) ===
No.	Episode	Directed by	Written by	Original release date	U.S. viewers (millions)
1	Episode 1	Jennie Paddon	Andrew Davies and Justin Young	19 March 2023	N/A
Charlotte returns to Sanditon with her fiancé, farmer Ralph Starling, to celebrate Georgiana's 21st birthday and coming into her inheritance, leading to an awkward reunion with Mr. Colbourne when his family also return to Sanditon. Tom tries to encourage Mr. Pryce, a wealthy and successful businessman, to invest in Sanditon, only to meet opposition from Lady Denham when she realises a previous connection. Lady Denham continues to force Edward to endure physical and religious regimens to improve his moral conduct in order to regain her favour. Desperate to hide scandal and restore their family fortunes by coming to Sanditon, the Dowager Duchess of Buckinghamshire seeks spouses for her children and decides on Georgiana for her son, Henry Montrose, the Duke of Buckinghamshire, and Mr. Colbourne for her daughter, Lady Lydia. At Georgiana's party, Charles Lockhart interrupts with devastating news for Georgiana's future.
2	Episode 2	Jennie Paddon	Andrea Gibb	26 March 2023	N/A
Georgiana is unable to find a lawyer to take her case against Lockhart, until Mr. Colbourne recruits his estranged and infamous brother Samuel. However, she is discouraged when Samuel warns her of the attacks on her character which she will have to endure to win. Though Charlotte claims to be staying in Sanditon to support Georgiana, Lady de Clermonte is concerned that she is staying to avoid marrying Ralph and having a life on his farm. Harry Montrose, the Duke of Buckinghamshire, tries to help Arthur when his plans to hold a recital for King George IV featuring celebrated soprano Elizabeth Greenhorn go awry, and Arthur's honesty impresses Miss Greenhorn into performing despite the King's absence. Mr. Pryce reminds Lady Denham of their past to convince her about the building of a grand hotel in Sanditon, but Tom is dismayed their chosen site will displace the homes of local fishermen. Edward decides to pursue Augusta Markham, despite her warning that she is well aware that he is more interested in her impending inheritance. Inspired by Miss Greenhorn's performance, Georgiana decides to retain Samuel as her lawyer for the court case.
3	Episode 3	Jennie Paddon	Justin Young; Robin French	2 April 2023	N/A
Georgiana's former love Otis appears in London to offer her his support regardless of the trial's outcome. Though Georgiana wins, she realises that her social standing has changed and decides she has better protection from fortune hunters by continuing her 'courtship' arrangement with Harry Montrose. At Mr. Colbourne's shooting party, Lydia Montrose finds that she shares interests with Mr. Colbourne. Edward's request for permission to court Augusta is rejected by her uncle. Tom agrees to the seaside hotel site when he learns of the potential profit, but infuriates Mary when she learns that he has chosen money over people's homes. Lady Denham agrees to go for a buggy drive with Mr. Pryce. Mr. Colbourne confesses to Charlotte his love for her, but she upbraids him for not speaking earlier, and refuses to reciprocate because she feels she cannot break her promise to marry Ralph.
4	Episode 4	Steve Brett	Colin Bytheway	9 April 2023	N/A
Various relationships begin to flourish while others falter in Sanditon. Tom dismisses Mary's plans to improve the old town and is then upset that she finds support instead from Mr. Colbourne. Arthur and Harry's budding relationship is set back when Harry and Georgiana are engaged - Harry out of duty as a duke, and Georgiana to protect her fortune and reputation with a title. Ralph, misunderstanding Charlotte's misery in Sanditon, tries to persuade her to return to Willingden at once, but they are interrupted when Mr. Colbourne beseeches Charlotte to help him when it is discovered that Augusta has eloped with Edward Denham.
5	Episode 5	Steve Brett	Jo Spain	16 April 2023	N/A
Charlotte and Mr. Colbourne catch up with Edward Denham and Augusta. On Charlotte's advice, Mr. Colbourne tells Augusta he will respect her decision regarding Edward Denham, but Augusta is left brokenhearted when Edward says that he was only ever interested in her inheritance. Samuel Colbourne and Lady de Clermonte become closer. Georgiana is finally reunited with her long-lost mother, but tensions among friends and family increase over her impending marriage to Harry. Mary and Tom continue to fight over the fate of the old town, until Mary becomes seriously ill with a fever. Lady Denham begins to have doubts about her acceptance of Mr. Pryce's proposal. Ralph, realising that Charlotte is in love with Mr. Colbourne and only marrying him out of obligation, releases her from their engagement.
6	Episode 6	Steve Brett	Justin Young	23 April 2023	N/A
Mary recovers from her illness and Tom cancels his partnership with Mr. Pryce in favour of fulfilling Mary's plans for the old town. Lady Denham decides not to marry Mr. Pryce to keep her independence, but he offers another way to maintain their relationship. Seeing that Edward has shown improvement in his character, Lady Denham offers him a living as a clergyman. Realising their marriage would be miserable, Georgiana and Harry end their engagement so they can be with the people they love. Charlotte prepares to leave Sanditon believing Mr. Colbourne is engaged, while he still does not know that she has ended her own engagement. At the last moment they discover the truth, and marry. One year later, Charlotte runs a school in Sanditon alongside her new family.

== Production ==
Many of the Sanditon scenes were filmed in Somerset, including the seaside towns of Clevedon, Brean and Weston-super-Mare. Dyrham Park near Bath, Somerset was the location for Sanditon House. The bridge at Iford Manor was used in the first episode. Most of the interior filming was on interior and exterior sets built at The Bottle Yard Studios in Bristol.

Before the first series premiered in the United States, ITV cancelled it in December 2019. With the help of Masterpiece (PBS) and fans of the show, Sanditon was able to fundraise enough money to continue the series. Series two was announced to be released on 20 March 2022, followed by a third series. Three main actors from series one, Theo James, Mark Stanley, and Leo Suter had all moved on to new projects and did not return for series two.

With Theo James’ (Sidney Parker) departure from the series, new cast members were announced, with Rose Williams reprising her role as Charlotte Heywood. Series 2 began filming in July 2021. Season 2 premiered on PBS on March 20, 2022 and Series 2 aired on ITV on 22 July 2022. Season 3 premiered on PBS on March 19, 2023.

== Critical reception ==
The series opened to mixed reviews on Rotten Tomatoes but improved to receive a 100% Fresh rating for its third season. Some UK media outlets reported that viewers were shocked at the depictions of sex and nudity in the opening episode, considering it to be untrue to the works of Jane Austen.
