= Ordeal by Innocence =

1958 mystery novel by Agatha Christie

- Dust-jacket illustration of the first UK edition
- Author: Agatha Christie
- Cover artist: Not known
- Language: English
- Genre: Crime novel
- Publisher: Collins Crime Club
- Publication date: 3 November 1958
- Publication place: United Kingdom
- Media type: Print (hardback and paperback)
- Pages: 256 (first edition, hardcover)
- Preceded by: 4:50 from Paddington
- Followed by: Cat Among the Pigeons

Ordeal by Innocence is a mystery novel by British writer Agatha Christie, first published in the UK by the Collins Crime Club on 3 November 1958 and in the US by Dodd, Mead and Company the following year. The UK edition retailed at twelve shillings and sixpence (12/6) and the US edition at $2.95.

A crucial witness is unaware of his role as such until two years after a man is found guilty of a murder. When he realizes the information he holds, he re-opens the pain of loss in a family, and re-opens the question of who the murderer was two years ago.

This novel received mixed reviews at the time of publication, as reviewers were not generally comfortable with the psychological aspects of the story. The plot had her "customary ingenuity" but lacked "blitheness" and was "much too like an attempt at psychological fiction". Sympathy is evoked for too many characters, "but the unravelling is sound and the story well told." Another said there is ingenuity and a good ending, but the plot "lacks a central focus" and it appears that the "serious socio-psychological approach doesn't suit" Christie's writing. A later review considered it one of the better Christie novels of the 1950s, and noted that the author sometimes called it her own favourite.

== Plot summary ==
Geophysicist Arthur Calgary appears at the Argyle home Sunny Point two years after Rachel Argyle, wife and mother of five adopted children, was bludgeoned to death. Her son Jacko was tried and imprisoned for the crime, and died after 6 months in prison. Calgary explains that Jacko is innocent of murder, because his alibi was true. Calgary is the man who gave Jacko a lift into town and talked with him, at the time that the murder was known to have happened. Calgary is confused by the family’s reaction to his news. It had been difficult to face them with his failure to appear at the time of the trial, yet no one welcomes his effort for justice. Brother Micky Argyle realises immediately that there could be a murderer among them still, and visits Calgary in his hotel room to talk to him. As the new police investigations proceed, they suspect in turn Jacko's father Leo, his brother Micky, his sisters Mary, Tina and Hester, his father’s secretary Gwenda, and the long-time housekeeper Kirsten. Calgary visits the defence lawyer, who gives him more details of the event and some insights into the family, and the position which the news puts them all in. Calgary feels he must now assist the family in the new situation.

Dr Calgary was unaware of the trial because he was hit by a truck within hours after meeting Jacko, and a concussion blocked Calgary's recent memory. He left the country on a lengthy polar expedition when police were seeking the driver of the car. Jacko’s photo jogs his memory upon Calgary’s return to England; he recalls conversing with Jacko. Calgary feels his duty to justice to come forward, and the police accept his reasons for not appearing earlier.

Calgary next visits retired local doctor, Dr MacMaster, to ask him about Jacko. MacMaster was surprised when Jacko was convicted for killing Rachel, but not because murder was outside Jacko's 'moral range'. He sees Jacko as one too cowardly to kill another; instead, he would direct an accomplice. Calgary speaks to Maureen, who reveals Jacko's persuasive ways with older women: initiating affairs and then taking money from them. Hester visits Calgary in London, as she cannot take the tension at home. Each returns to Sunny Point. Calgary meets with one older woman who had fallen for Jacko’s compliments and given him money. The police gather new information from family members as they seek the murderer. Micky plans to meet with Tina, to learn what she did the night of the murder and tell her of his new job out of England. Mary Argyle and her husband Cmdr Philip Durrant stay at Sunny Point during this period of upset. Philip tries to find the guilty one among them and his efforts spur the killer to strike again.

At Philip’s request, Tina comes to Sunny Point. As she reaches his room, Kirsten is at the door with a tray, and they see that Philip is dead at his desk. Tina walks away until she collapses outdoors, where Micky sees her fall and carries her inside. Doctor Craig arrives and says that Tina has been stabbed in the back and must go to hospital.

Hester tells Calgary about Philip and Tina. Calgary heads to Superintendent Huish, who repeats the words Tina spoke in hospital, that the cup was empty, Philip's cup, meaning Kirsten was leaving not entering the room. At Sunny Point, Calgary reveals to all, in the library, that the killer is the housekeeper, Kirsten. Jacko had persuaded the plain Kirsten that he was in love with her, and persuaded her to murder Mrs Argyle to steal some money he wanted that his mother would not give him. Kirsten learns that Jacko was secretly married, by meeting his wife the day after the murder. Kirsten realises what a fool she has been and sees the evil in Jacko.

Once accused, Kirsten runs away from Sunny Point. The family expect the police will arrest her. While Mary mourns her beloved husband, her sister Hester professes her love for Arthur Calgary. She suspects that Tina and Micky will get together once Tina recovers. Leo feels free to remarry.

== Characters ==
- Arthur Calgary: a geophysicist who gave a lift to Jacko Argyle two years earlier, and then was out of the country when Argyle was on trial for murder. Thus, Calgary could not give his testimony, which would have backed up Argyle's statement. He does give it when he returns to England and learns what happened.
- Leo Argyle: Rachel's husband. He is a wealthy man with an interest in research on the history of economics and a calm personality.
- Rachel Argyle: Leo's wife, and mother of five adopted children. She had a strong instinct for mothering, and was also active in charity work. She inherited wealth from her parents which she set up in trusts for her children. She was murdered about two years before the novel opens.
- Mary Durrant (formerly Mary Argyle): eldest child of Leo and Rachel, about age 27, and the first child they adopted, while they were in New York City before World War II.
- Philip Durrant: Mary's husband; he served as a pilot in the war, when he married Mary. About two years before the novel opens, he contracted polio, paralyzing his legs.
- Michael "Micky" Argyle: adopted son of Leo and Rachel. He is angry that his birth mother did not seek him from Sunny Point after the war ended. He works as a car salesman in the nearby town.
- Jack "Jacko" Argyle: adopted son of Leo and Rachel; he died in prison of pneumonia, convicted of killing his mother. He had been both an amusing person and one of fierce anger, and already had a police record.
- Hester Argyle: adopted daughter of Leo and Rachel. She is about 20 and is challenged to find her own place in the world. She shows her strong emotions.
- Christina "Tina" Argyle: adopted daughter of Leo and Rachel. She came to them at age 3, and remembers no other parents. She works in a library in a nearby town and has her own place there. She is of mixed race, and has a calm personality.
- Kirsten Lindstrom: nurse and masseuse from Sweden, she joined the Argyle household during the war when Rachel opened their home as a place for children age 2 to 7, safe from the bombing of the second World War. She stays on as a housekeeper.
- Gwenda Vaughan: Leo Argyle's secretary for his research, in her late 30s. She lives in her own place, walking distance from Sunny Point. She and Leo were about to announce their engagement before the novel opens.
- Superintendent Huish: police officer who handled the first investigation and is called on to conduct the second with this new information.
- Dr MacMaster: retired local doctor who saw the children in the Sunny Point house, and formed views on the five children adopted by the Argyles.
- Mr Andrew Marshall: attorney for the Argyle family and the defense for Jacko at his trial.
- Donald Craig: young doctor in town, who is dating Hester Argyle. He loves her but he does not believe in her.
- Maureen Clegg: previously married to Jacko Argyle. He kept her a secret from his family until she appeared at Sunny Point the day after the murder. She works selling snacks in a movie theatre. Soon after Jacko died she married Joe Clegg, an electrician.
- Unnamed middle-aged woman: interviewed by Arthur Calgary, she had fallen for Jacko and tells how he fooled her with love when he planned to take her money.

== Literary significance and reception ==
Philip John Stead concluded his review in the Times Literary Supplement of 12 December 1958, with, "The solution of Ordeal By Innocence is certainly not below the level of Mrs Christie's customary ingenuity, but the book lacks other qualities which her readers have come to expect. What has become of the blitheness, the invigorating good spirits with which the game of detection is played in so many of her stories? Ordeal By Innocence slips out of that cheerful arena into something much too like an attempt at psychological fiction. It is too much of a conversation piece and too many people are talking – people in whom it is hard to take the necessary amount of interest because there is not enough space to establish them. The kind of workmanship which has been lavished on this tale is not a kind in which the author excels and the reader feels that Miss Marple and Poirot would thoroughly disapprove of the whole business."

Sarah Russell of The Guardian gave a short review to the novel in the 9 December 1958 issue when she said, "In this solving of a two-year-old family murder sympathy is, unusually with Miss Christie, evoked for too many people to leave enough suspects; but the unravelling is sound and the story well told."

Maurice Richardson said of this novel that "The veteran Norn has nodded over this one. There is ingenuity, of course, but it lacks a central focus. The characters are stodgy and there is little of that so readable, almost crunchable dialogue, like burnt sugar." He concluded, "The serious socio-psychological approach doesn't suit A C somehow. Only at the end with the big surprise do you feel home and dry."

Robert Barnard considered this novel as "One of the best of 'fifties Christies, and one of her own favourites (though she named different titles at different times). The Five Little Pigs pattern of murder-in-the-past, the convicted murderer having died in prison, innocent." His evaluation was that it was "Short on detection, but fairly dense in social observation. Understanding in treatment of adopted children, but not altogether tactful on the colour question: 'Tina's always the dark horse…Perhaps it's the half of her that isn't white.'"

== Adaptations ==
=== Film ===
Ordeal by Innocence (1985)

A film adaptation was released in 1985, directed by Desmond Davis. It starred Donald Sutherland as Arthur Calgary, Sarah Miles as Mary Durrant, Christopher Plummer as Leo Argyle, Ian McShane as Philip Durrant, Diana Quick as Gwenda Vaughan, and Faye Dunaway as Rachel Argyle.

The film's musical score by Dave Brubeck was criticised as inappropriate for its style of mystery. Pino Donaggio had already composed many pieces for the project, but was too busy to work on the project when various film edits needed re-scoring, so Brubeck took over from him. Donaggio's original score had swirling strings, lush melodies, and tension-filled passages.

=== Television ===
==== Agatha Christie's Marple (2007) ====
The novel was adapted for the third season of the ITV television series Agatha Christie's Marple featuring Geraldine McEwan as the eponymous Miss Marple in 2007, although the character was not in the original novel. The episode guest starred Denis Lawson as Leo, Stephanie Leonidas as Hester, Lisa Stansfield as Mary, and Jane Seymour as Rachel. This version made noticeable differences from the novel, such as having Jacko (Burn Gorman) executed by hanging instead of dying in prison of pneumonia.

Gwenda Vaughan (Juliet Stevenson) takes Philip Durrant's (Richard Armitage) place as the household member who is murdered by Kirsten (Alison Steadman) for coming too close to the truth. Omitted completely is Kirsten's attempt to silence Tina (Gugu Mbatha-Raw) and Micky (Bryan Dick) by stabbing Tina. There is also the addition of another adopted child, Bobby (Tom Riley), the twin brother of Jacko, who commits suicide after financial ruin. Kirsten is shown being arrested at the end, unlike in the original novel in which her arrest was not explicitly included in the actual text.

==== Les Petits Meurtres d'Agatha Christie (2009) ====
The novel was adapted as the second episode of the French television series Les Petits Meurtres d'Agatha Christie, airing in 2009.

==== Ordeal by Innocence (2018) ====
BBC One broadcast a three-episode series based on Ordeal by Innocence in 2018. It was filmed in Inverkip, Scotland, and stars Bill Nighy as Leo Argyll (changed from "Argyle" in the novel), Luke Treadaway as Arthur Calgary, Anna Chancellor as Rachel Argyll, Ella Purnell as Hester Argyll, Eleanor Tomlinson as Mary Durrant, Crystal Clarke as Tina Argyll, Morven Christie as Kirsten Lindstrom, Matthew Goode as Philip Durrant, Alice Eve as Gwenda Vaughan, and Anthony Boyle as Jack (not Jacko) Argyll. The script was written by Sarah Phelps, who also adapted the Christie miniseries And Then There Were None and The Witness for the Prosecution for the BBC. First scheduled to air in 2017, the series was delayed due to sexual allegations against actor Ed Westwick, who was originally cast as Mickey Argyll, which led to Westwick's scenes being reshot with Christian Cooke as Mickey.

The series features many differences from the original novel, including the ending, where the killer is revealed to be Leo instead of Kirsten. Additionally, Jack is depicted as having no involvement with Rachel's murder and is the biological son of Leo and Kirsten, resulting in Leo having him beaten to death in prison when he threatens to reveal his true parentage. The series also portrays Calgary as a former mental patient, which causes doubts toward his testimony as Jack's alibi.

=== Stage ===
The novel was also adapted into a stage play by Mary Jane Hansen performed for the first time by the New York State Theatre Institute in Troy, New York. The original run lasted from 4 to 17 February 2007, and included 14 performances.

=== Comics ===
Ordeal by Innocence was released by HarperCollins as a graphic novel adaptation on 1 July 2008, adapted and illustrated by "Chandre" (ISBN 0-00-727531-5). This was translated from the edition first published in France by Emmanuel Proust éditions in 2006 under the title of Témoin indésirable.

=== Radio ===
The BBC produced a radio adaptation by Joy Wilkinson, starring Mark Umbers as Arthur Calgary, Jacqueline Defferary as Gwenda, and Phoebe Waller-Bridge as Hester Argyle. It was first broadcast on BBC Radio 4 over three weeks beginning 17 March 2014.

== Publication history ==
- 1958, Collins Crime Club (London), 3 November 1958, Hardcover, 256 pp
- 1959, Dodd Mead and Company (New York), 1959, Hardcover, 247 pp
- 1960, Pocket Books (New York), Paperback, 211 pp
- 1961, Fontana Books (Imprint of HarperCollins), Paperback, 192 pp
- 1964, Ulverscroft Large-print Edition, Hardcover, 256 pp

In the UK the novel was first serialised in the weekly magazine John Bull in two abridged instalments from 20 September (Volume 104, Number 2725) to 27 September 1958 (Volume 104, Number 2726) with illustrations by "Fancett".

In the US, the first publication was in the Chicago Tribune in thirty-six parts from Sunday, 1 February to Saturday, 14 March 1959 under the title of The Innocent.

An abridged version of the novel was also published in the 21 February 1959 issue of the Star Weekly Complete Novel, a Toronto newspaper supplement, with a cover illustration by Russell Maebus.
