= Patrick Baladi =

English actor

- Born: Patrick Baladi; Sutton Coldfield, West Midlands, England
- Education: Royal Central School of Speech and Drama
- Occupation: Actor
- Years active: 1995–present

Patrick Baladi is an English actor. He is best known for playing Neil Godwin in the BBC sitcom The Office, Michael Jackson in the Sky 1 drama Stella, Stephen Holmes in the ITV thriller Marcella, and jailed solicitor Jimmy Lakewell in the BBC drama Line of Duty.

== Early life and education ==
Baladi was born in Sutton Coldfield, West Midlands. His father was a Syrian gynaecologist and obstetrician, and his mother a midwife.

Baladi was brought up in Libya and educated at Stonyhurst College, in Hurst Green, Lancashire. There he played rugby in the First XV, and won the Charles Laughton Prize for acting.

After school he went on to train as an actor at the Central School of Speech and Drama in London, where he became friends with Martin Freeman.

== Career ==
Baladi is known for his portrayal of David Brent's nemesis, Neil Godwin, in the BBC's hit comedy-mockumentary series, The Office. He appeared in the second and final series of the award-winning show, as well as the subsequent The Office Christmas Special.

In addition to The Office, Baladi has appeared in various films and television shows, including Bodies, Kidnap and Ransom, as Philip Shaffer, ITV (2011), Alpha Male, Bridget Jones: The Edge of Reason, Beyond The Pole, POW, Lady Audley's Secret, Grafters, Silent Witness, The International, Party Animals, Mistresses, Rev., Sensitive Skin, Privates, Stella, Line of Duty, A Touch of Frost and Midsomer Murders.

Baladi portrayed Dodi Al-Fayed in the 2007 television docudrama Diana: Last Days of a Princess. In 2008 he had a small role in the romantic comedy Last Chance Harvey, appearing alongside Emma Thompson. He is also a stage actor who has appeared in numerous productions by the Royal Shakespeare Company, such as Hamlet and Much Ado About Nothing. He starred in the comedy No Heroics as Excelsor.

== Personal life ==
Baladi married Gemma Walker and had one daughter before they divorced.

Baladi remarried to Janie Erith, and the couple had a daughter in 2016.

In 2017, Baladi set up a booth at the Malthouse Emporium, an antiques and furniture centre in Stroud in Gloucestershire.

== Filmography ==
=== Film ===
Year	Title	Role	Notes
2000	Lady Audley's Secret	Sir Harry Towers	TV film
2001	High Heels and Low Lifes	Car Driver	
2004	Bridget Jones: The Edge of Reason	Steward	
2004	Low Street	Young Man	Short film
2006	Alpha Male	Clive Lamis	
2006	The Only Boy for Me	Mack	TV film
2007	Diana: Last Days of a Princess	Dodi Al Fayed	TV film
2007	World of Wrestling	Rollerball	Short film
2008	Consuming Passion: 100 Years of Mills & Boon	Dr Grant/Dr Steele	TV film
2008	Last Chance Harvey	Simon	
2009	The International	Martin White	
2009	Beyond the Pole	Robert	
2009	Jubilee	Nick Bright	Short film
2009	Octavia	Jeremy West	TV film
2010	StreetDance 3D	Mr. Harding	
2011	Honeymoon for One	Greg Young	TV film
2011	Demons Never Die	Gary Hudson	
2012	N.F.A. (No Fixed Abode)	Adam	
2012	Now Is Good	Richard	
2013	Eve	Editor	Short film
2013	Rush	John Hogan	
2015	Chasing Robert Barker	Olly Clifford	
2016	The Windmill Massacre	Douglas West	
2017	The Kidnapping of Richard Franco	Richard Franco	Short film

=== Television ===
Key
†	Denotes television productions that have not yet been released

Year	Title	Role	Notes
1995	Soldier Soldier	Orderly Sergeant	Episode: "Leaving"
1996	Dalziel and Pascoe	Anthony Wilkes	Episode: "A Clubbable Woman"
1996	Sharman	George	Episode: "Series 1, Episode 1"
1997	Ivanhoe	Joseph	Episode: "Part Three"
1998	Grafters	Will	Recurring role, 2 episodes
2001	Perfect World	Jeremy	Episode: "Best Man"
2001	Midsomer Murders	Steve Ramsey	Episode: "The Electric Vendetta"
2001	Masterpiece Theatre	Italian Video Suiter	Episode: "The Merchant of Venice"
2001	Casualty	Gary Fox	Episode: "Lost and Found"
2002	Heartbeat	Ray Thompson	Episode: "From Ancient Grudge"
2002–2003	The Office	Neil Godwin	Series regular, 8 episodes
2003	Messiah 2: Vengeance Is Mine	Jonathan	Miniseries, 2 episodes
2003	EastEnders	Dom	Episode: "25 March 2003"
2003	Real Crime	Dimitri Horne	Episode: "Lady Jane"
2003	P.O.W.	Captain Attercombe	Series regular, 6 episodes
2004	The Afternoon Play	Peter Hamilton	Episode: "Venus and Mar"
2004	A Touch of Frost	Edward D'arblay	Episode: "Dancing in the Dark"
2004	New Tricks	Greg Johnson	Recurring role, 3 episodes
2004–2006	Bodies	Dr. Roger Hurley	Series regular, 17 episodes
2005	Sensitive Skin	Michael Dorkins	Episode: "Series 1, Episode 5"
2006	My Family	Tony	Episode: "Dentally Unstable"
2006	Agatha Christie's Poirot	Rowley Cloade	Episode: "Taken at the Flood"
2006	Heartbeat	Guy Maitland	Episode: "Intelligence Matters"
2007	Party Animals	James Northcote	Series regular, 8 episodes
2008	No Heroics	Excelsor	Series regular, 6 episodes
2008	Silent Witness	Peter Ellis	Episode: "Finding Rachel"
2008–2010	Mistresses	Richard Dunlop	Series regular, 15 episodes
2009	The Old Guys	Reverend Phil	Episode: "Courtesan"
2009	Hotel Babylon	Ed Martyn	Recurring role, 2 episodes
2009	Big Top	Andy James	Episode: "Boyfriend"
2010	Identity	AC Hugh Wainwright	Recurring role, 4 episodes
2010	Agatha Christie's Marple	Jonathan Frayn	Episode: "The Blue Geranium"
2010	Casualty	Sam Fulton	Episode: "A Day in a Life"
2011	Kidnap and Ransom	Philip Shaffer	Recurring role, 3 episodes
2011	Garrow's Law	General Picton	Episode: "Series 3, Episode 3"
2012	Hustle	DI Sid Fisk	Episode: "Curiosity Caught the Kat"
2012	Cardinal Burns	Various roles	Episode: "Series 1, Episode 5"
2012	Lewis	Robert Fraser	Episode: "The Indelible Stain"
2012	The Midnight Beast	Jay Chithole	Episode: "Boyband"
2012	Vexed	Mark Armstrong	Episode: "Series 2, Episode 6"
2012	DCI Banks	Martin Fleming	Episode: "Dry Bones That Dream"
2012	The Poison Tree	Francis	Miniseries, 2 episodes
2013	Privates	Captain Gulliver	Recurring role, 5 episodes
2013	Ripper Street	Sidney Ressler	Episode: "The King Came Calling"
2013	Death in Paradise	Daryl Dexter	Episode: "An Unholy Death"
2013	Jo	Serge Montaigne	Episode: "Pigalle"
2013	It's Kevin	Various roles	Episode: "Series 1, Episode 3"
2013	Waterloo Road	Julian Noble	Episode: "Dirty Laundry"
2013	Law & Order: UK	Richard McGrath	Episode: "Fatherly Love"
2014	Rev.	Rob	Episode: "Series 3, Episode 2"
2014–2017	Stella	Michael Jackson	Series regular, 36 episodes
2016	Marcella	Stephen Holmes	Recurring role, 7 episodes
2017, 2021	Line of Duty	Jimmy Lakewell	Recurring role, 2 series, 7 episodes
2018	No Offence	Lionel Dirkin	Recurring role, 3 episodes
2018–2019	Berlin Station	Dominic Kingsbury	Recurring role, 2 episodes
2019	Grantchester	Archer Davis	Episode: "Series 4, Episode 2"
2019	Vera	Ross Varsey	Episode: "Cold River"
2019	Shakespeare & Hathaway: Private Investigators	Alfred D'Angelo	Episode: "In My Memory Lock'd"
2019	Timewasters	Jonty	Episode: "By Any Means Necessary"
2019	Warrior	Senator Crestwood	Recurring role, 3 episodes
2019–2020	Semi-Detached	Ted	Series regular, 6 episodes
2020	Casualty	Liam Barnett	Episode: "Series 34, Episode 21"
2020–2022	Breeders	Darren	Recurring role, 14 episodes
2021	Ted Lasso	John	Episode: "Goodbye Earl"
2021	Silent Witness	Ron Radford	Episode: "Bad Love"
2022	Sister Boniface Mysteries	Lesley Canon	Episode: "Crimes and Miss Demeanours"
2022	The Playlist	Jim Anderson	Episode: "The Artist"
2024	D.I. Ray Series 2	DI Patrick Holden	Episode: "Crimes and Miss Demeanours"
2025	The War Between the Land and the Sea	Sir Keith Spears	Miniseries, 3 episodes
2025	Little Disasters	Andrew	Series regular, 6 episodes
2025	The Hack	John Whittingdale	Episode 1,3,7
2026 †	Number 10 †		Upcoming series

=== Theatre ===
Year	Title	Role	Venue	Notes
1995	Mother Courage and Her Children	First Soldier	Olivier Theatre, London	
1998	Camino Real	Officer	Young Vic, London	with Royal Shakespeare Company
1998	Much Ado About Nothing	Borachio	Royal Shakespeare Theatre, Stratford-upon-Avon	with Royal Shakespeare Company
1999	Battle Royal	Galdini	Lyttelton Theatre, London	
1999	The Backroom	Dallas	Bush Theatre, London	
2000	Albert Speer	Theodor Ganzenmuller	Lyttelton Theatre, London	
2000	A Taste of Honey	Peter	Watford Palace Theatre, Watford	
2001	Finding the Sun	Benjamin	Cottesloe Theatre, London	
2002	Dealer's Choice	Frankie	Birmingham Repertory Theatre, Birmingham	
2002	My Night with Reg	John	Birmingham Repertory Theatre, Birmingham	
2008	Purgatorio	Man	Arcola Theatre, London	
2011	Loyalty	Tony Blair	Hampstead Theatre, London	
