= Theeb =

2014 film

- Film poster
- Directed by: Naji Abu Nowar
- Written by: Naji Abu Nowar; Bassel Ghandour
- Produced by: Bassel Ghandour; Rupert Lloyd; Nadine Toukan; Nasser Kalaji; Laith Majali; Diala Al Raie; Yanal Kassay
- Starring: Jacir Eid; Hassan Mutlag; Hussein Salameh; Jack Fox; Marji Audeh
- Cinematography: Wolfgang Thaler
- Edited by: Rupert Lloyd
- Music by: Jerry Lane
- Production companies: Bayt Al Shawareb; Noor Pictures; Immortal Entertainment
- Distributed by: MAD Solutions (MENA); New Wave Films (UK)
- Release dates: 4 September 2014 (Venice); 19 March 2015 (UAE); 19 March 2015 (Jordan); 14 August 2015 (UK)
- Running time: 100 minutes
- Countries: Jordan; United Kingdom; United Arab Emirates; Qatar
- Languages: Hejazi Arabic; English
- Box office: $774,556

Theeb (Arabic: ذيب, romanized: dhīb, lit. 'wolf' [ðiːb]) is a 2014 co-produced by Bassel Ghandour period drama thriller film co-written with Bassel Ghandour and directed by Naji Abu Nowar. It is a coming-of-age story about a Bedouin boy, Theeb, who must survive in the wide-open Wadi Rum desert. The film takes place during the Middle Eastern theatre of the First World War, in the wake of the Great Arab Revolt against the ruling Ottoman Empire. The film used non-professional actors from the Bedouin community in southern Jordan, and is considered a "Bedouin Western". It has also been described as a coming-of-age film. Theeb is an international co-production from Jordan, the United Kingdom, the United Arab Emirates (UAE) and Qatar.

The film premiered in the Horizons section at the 71st Venice International Film Festival on 4 September 2014, where Abu Nowar won the award for Best Director. It was nominated for the Best Foreign Language Film at the 88th Academy Awards, making it the first Jordanian nomination ever. At the 69th British Academy Film Awards, Theeb was nominated for Best Film Not in the English Language, where Naji Abu Nowar and Rupert Lloyd won the Outstanding Debut by a British Writer, Director or Producer.

== Plot ==
In 1916, recently orphaned brothers Hussein and Theeb, the second and third sons of a Bedouin sheik of the Howeitat tribe, come from a family of pilgrim guides and are accustomed to a nomadic lifestyle. One night, their camp is visited by Edward, a British officer, and an Arab named Marji. Custom requires that a goat be slaughtered for the visitors, but Theeb, still a boy, has great difficulty bringing himself to do it. The officer is carrying a wooden box, rumoured to contain gold, which piques Theeb's curiosity. Hussein is asked to guide them to a Roman well lying on the pilgrims' trail, next to the strategic Ottoman railway. Men at the camp warn that the trail is rife with bandits. Theeb wants to join, but his brother insists on leaving him behind. The next day, as the group leaves, the boy disobeys his brother and follows them, managing to catch up after a day's walk. Despite objections from Hussein and Marji concerning Theeb's presence and fear for his safety, Edward is adamant about continuing their travel immediately, so Theeb stays with the group.

They reach the well, only to discover dead bodies have been thrown into it. The group then notices that they are being watched by a group of men in the distance. They quickly escape, but Edward insists that they continue. Hussein leads them to another nearby well in a canyon, where they are ambushed. Edward and Marji are suddenly shot dead from a distance. Hussein and Theeb hide from the raiders; when night falls, another engagement with the raiders leaves Hussein dead. While trying to escape, Theeb falls into the well, but manages to climb up the next day. He buries his murdered brother.

Theeb spends the day wandering around the canyon and eventually notices a camel heading towards him from the distance. He approaches the camel and finds an unconscious man collapsed on top. The next day, Theeb wakes up to see the man staring at him. He is Hassan, a gravely injured mercenary who is one of the perpetrators of the ambush. Theeb is too small to get the camel to obey him, and Hassan is too injured to move. They are initially aggressive and hostile but soon realise that they need each other's help to survive.

Theeb spends some time with Hassan, feeding and healing him. Hassan asks Theeb not to betray him, considering how he let Theeb eat with him. The next day, the pair mount the camel and head towards an Ottoman rail station. They bump into Arab revolutionaries who ask Hassan questions regarding his modern Western belongings – they are looking for the British officer, who had coordinated an attack with them against the Ottomans on the Hejaz railway. Allowed to pass, the two continue towards the rail station. On their way there, they pass by a part of the railway where dozens of dead Arab revolutionaries lie. They had been waiting for the British officer, with his wooden box detonator, which was intended to blow up the railway. At the station, Hassan sells the Englishman's belongings to an Ottoman officer. The officer offers Theeb a coin as well, which Theeb declines, having realized that Hassan was being paid money for items he stole after killing his brother. Theeb then waits outside the station for Hassan to come out, then shoots him dead. Theeb explains to the Ottoman officer who has rushed out that Hassan killed his brother. The officer tells Theeb to go home, and he rides off into the desert.

== Cast ==
- Jacir Eid Al-Hwietat as Theeb
- Hussein Salameh Al-Sweilhiyeen as Hussein
- Hassan Mutlag Al-Maraiyeh as The Stranger
- Jack Fox as Edward
- Marji Audeh as The Guide

== Production ==
=== Development ===
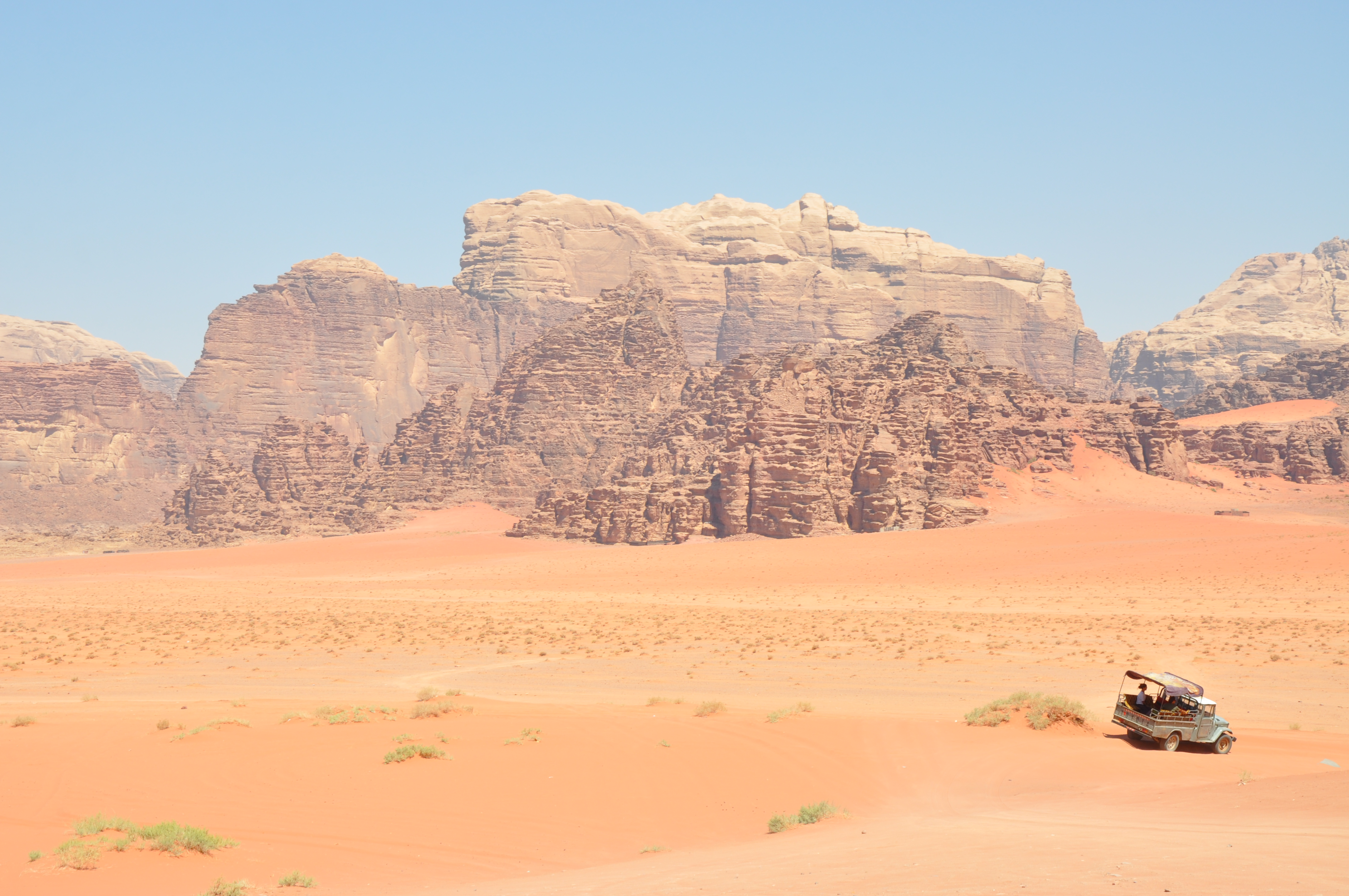
Most of Theeb was filmed in Wadi Rum, in southern Jordan.

Bassel Ghandour wrote the script and shared it with Naji Abu Nowar with the idea to do a short film. Abu Nowar reverted and suggested this be a feature film, and from there the story begins. While preparing to do the film, Ghandour, Abu Nowar, and producer Rupert Lloyd spent a year in the desert living in Shakrieh village with the local community, learning the Bedouin lifestyle. Initially, the filmmakers planned to have women characters involved. This was hindered by the fact that they wanted to use non-professional actors and found no women from the Bedouin communities willing to act in a film. They considered bringing professional actresses but they did not know the Bedouin dialect, so the film would have lost some of its authenticity. Jack Fox as the British officer was the only professional actor involved; the Bedouins had never participated in any type of acting. Several workshops took place to prepare the Bedouin actors for the film, who were chosen by auditions.

Abu Nowar initially did not like Jacir, the actor playing Theeb. "He was so shy and quiet, I never considered him, but when you put him on camera, he [turns into] a different person. Immediately it became obvious. And so he was the first person we cast and we never looked back or at anyone else." The funding, although inadequate[opinion], was secured by private sector investors, as well as several institutions; King Abdullah II fund for development, Doha film institute, and Abu Dhabi-based Sanad film fund.

=== Filming ===
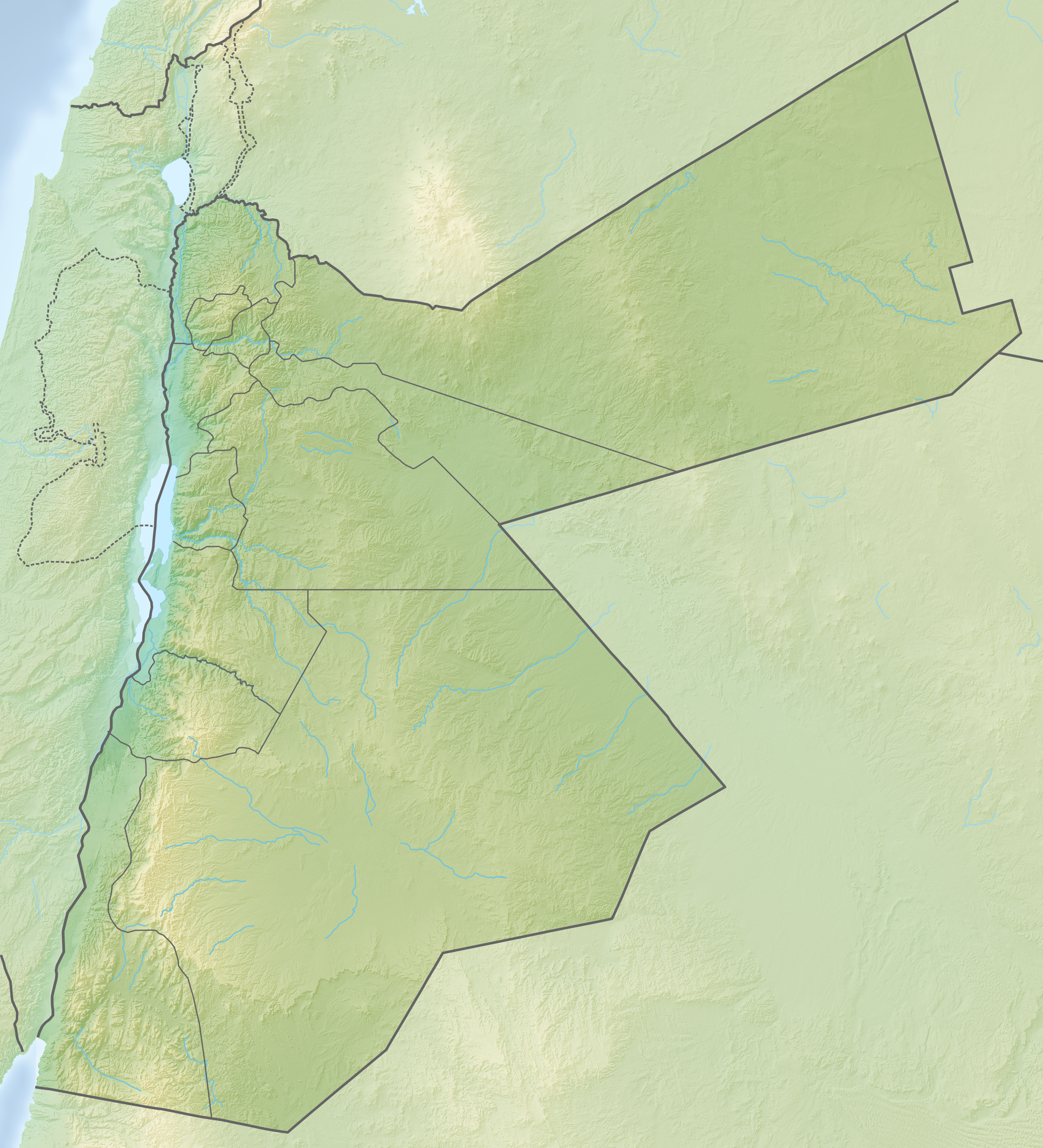
Filming locations for Theeb

Jordan's filming community had been preoccupied with Kathryn Bigelow's terrorism drama Zero Dark Thirty and so filming had to be postponed. The production team filmed in the same area where David Lean shot Lawrence of Arabia in the early 1960s; they had to avoid these locations due to heavy tourist activity. Filming took place in three locations; Theeb's tribal encampment was shot in Wadi Araba, next to the Israeli military border zone, the pilgrim's trail was shot in Wadi Rum, and the Ottoman fortress was shot at Qasr Dab'ah about 40 km south-southeast of Amman. A canyon, where the group in the film are ambushed, took several months to find and required a specific type of geography. It took the team an hour of off-roading to get to the canyon every day. Because that specific filming location was required, plans to organise the shoot as a nomadic unit were impractical. It would have been too costly and too dangerous to camp in the location area, where no cell phone reception reached. Instead, they lived in a nearby tourist desert camp. The camp had running water and a generator but still involved some off-roading and didn't have phone reception.

Among the major difficulties the crew faced during the five-week shoot were sand and heat. In Wadi Rum, they were hit with flash floods, storms, and rain. In Wadi Araba, temperatures routinely surpassed 40 °C. Abu Nowar recalls: "We consistently got stuck in the sand, I can't count the amount of times the Bedouin had to rescue us." During post-production, Lloyd realised that a key sequence in which Theeb climbs out of a desert well would have to be reshot, as it was visible that Eid was unable to swim. Abu Nowar spent four months of weekends teaching Eid to swim, before reshooting the entire sequence with a wig to cover his now-shorter hair. Abu Nowar told The Times' critic Kate Maltby: "I was doing take after take, desperately hoping it wasn’t going to float off in the water."

=== Visual effects ===
Due to the film's low budget, producers turned to students at San Francisco's Academy of Art University to help them with the visual effects.

== Release ==
Theeb premiered in Jordan in Shakiriyah village, where the film originated. The premier was attended by the Bedouin community of the village and by people from all over Jordan. It had its international premiere at the 2014 Venice Film Festival, where Abu Nowar won the award for Best Director in the Horizons category. Following this, the film went on to an outstanding box office run in eleven Arab countries.

=== Critical response ===
Theeb received positive reviews, and has been described as "Bedouin-Western" by some critics. On the review aggregator website Rotten Tomatoes, the film holds a 97% approval rating, and an average rating of 7.6/10, based on reviews from 72 critics. The website's critical consensus states, "Led by an outstanding performance from Jacir Eid Al-Hwietat in the title role, Theeb is a startlingly assured first effort from director/co-writer Naji Abu Nowar." On Metacritic, the film has received a weighted average score of 80 out of 100, based on 17 critics, indicating "Generally favorable reviews".

In his review for The Guardian, Jonathan Romney rated the film three out of five stars, calling it "Magnificently shot in Jordan", "Involving rather than totally gripping", and praised its "unimpeachable ring of authenticity". Writing for Time Out, Trevor Johnston gave the film four out of five stars. Added that it had "eye-searing landscapes and a fascinating historical setting" he finished his review with "A truly memorable first feature". Jay Weissberg writing for Variety described Theeb as " a classic adventure film of the best kind, and one that’s rarely seen these days".

Matt Damon was in Jordan during the filming phase of The Martian, and was shown the trailer of the movie. He commented "Damn, this was not shot on digital, right? This looks incredible, man. I can't tell you how impressive this is. You guys are doing remarkable things in cinema. I really want to watch it". After Theeb was nominated for an Oscar, Queen Noor tweeted, "Alf, alf Mabrouk to all who contributed to TheebFilm for its Oscars2016 nomination! Very proud of you." Queen Rania tweeted "Thrilled about Theeb’s nomination for the Oscars, a Jordanian production shot in the beautiful mountains of Wadi Rum. I hope it wins!" Experts said that Theeb's success is likely to boost international interest in shooting in Jordan.

=== Accolades ===
List of accolades
Award / Film Festival	Category	Recipient(s)	Result
88th Academy Awards	Best Foreign Language Film	Jordan	Nominated
69th British Academy Film Awards	Best Film Not in the English Language	Naji Abu Nowar	Nominated
69th British Academy Film Awards	Outstanding Debut by a British Writer, Director or Producer	Naji Abu Nowar, Rupert Lloyd	Won
71st Venice International Film Festival	Best Director (Horizons)	Naji Abu Nowar	Won
71st Venice International Film Festival	Best Film (Horizons)	Naji Abu Nowar	Nominated
Beijing International Film Festival	Best Picture by a New Director	Naji Abu Nowar	Won
Buenos Aires International Festival of Independent Cinema	Best Film	Naji Abu Nowar	Nominated
43rd Belgrade International Film Festival	Best Film	Naji Abu Nowar	Won
43rd Belgrade International Film Festival	Best Script	Naji Abu Nowar, Bassel Ghandour	Won
Dubai International Film Festival	Best Film from the Arab World	Naji Abu Nowar	Won
Dubai International Film Festival	FIPRESCI Prize for Best Narrative Feature	Naji Abu Nowar	Won
Abu Dhabi Film Festival	Best Film from the Arab World	Naji Abu Nowar	Won
Abu Dhabi Film Festival	Best Narrative Film	Naji Abu Nowar	Won
Abu Dhabi Film Festival	New Horizons Competition	Naji Abu Nowar	Nominated
32nd Miami International Film Festival	Jordan Alexander Ressler Screenwriting Award	Naji Abu Nowar	Won
Cairo International Film Festival	Jury Prize for Best Cinematography and Artistic Direction	Naji Abu Nowar	Won
Asia Pacific Screen Awards	Best Youth Feature Film	Naji Abu Nowar, Bassel Ghandour, Rupert Lloyd, Nasser Kalaj, Laith Majali	Nominated
Las Palmas de Gran Canaria International Film Festival	Audience Award	Naji Abu Nowar	Won
Beijing International Film Festival	Best Debut Film	Naji Abu Nowar	Won
London Film Festival	Best First Feature	Naji Abu Nowar	Nominated
Malmö Arab Film Festival	Best Feature Film	Naji Abu Nowar	Won
Camerimage	Best Directorial Debut	Naji Abu Nowar	Won
Glasgow Film Festival	Audience Award	Naji Abu Nowar	Nominated
Fribourg International Film Festival	Grand Prix	Naji Abu Nowar	Nominated
Filmfest München	Best Film By An Emerging Director	Naji Abu Nowar	Nominated

== See also ==
- List of submissions to the 88th Academy Awards for Best Foreign Language Film
- List of Jordanian submissions for the Academy Award for Best Foreign Language Film
