= Empire of Light =

2022 British-American drama film by Sam Mendes

- Theatrical release poster
- Directed by: Sam Mendes
- Written by: Sam Mendes
- Produced by: Pippa Harris; Sam Mendes
- Starring: Olivia Colman; Micheal Ward; Monica Dolan; Tom Brooke; Tanya Moodie; Hannah Onslow; Crystal Clarke; Toby Jones; Colin Firth
- Cinematography: Roger Deakins
- Edited by: Lee Smith
- Music by: Trent Reznor; Atticus Ross
- Production company: Neal Street Productions
- Distributed by: Searchlight Pictures
- Release dates: 3 September 2022 (Telluride); 9 December 2022 (United States); 9 January 2023 (United Kingdom)
- Running time: 115 minutes
- Countries: United Kingdom; United States
- Language: English
- Box office: $11.4 million

Empire of Light is a 2022 romantic drama film directed, written, and co-produced by Sam Mendes. Set in an English coastal town in the early 1980s, the film is about the power of human connection during turbulent times. It stars Olivia Colman, Micheal Ward, Monica Dolan, Tom Brooke, Tanya Moodie, Hannah Onslow, Crystal Clarke, Toby Jones and Colin Firth.

The film premiered at the 49th Telluride Film Festival on 3 September 2022, and was released by Searchlight Pictures through a limited theatrical release in the United States on 9 December 2022 and theatrically in the United Kingdom on 9 January 2023. At the 80th Golden Globe Awards, Colman was nominated for Best Actress in a Motion Picture – Drama, while Ward received a nomination for Best Actor in a Supporting Role at the 76th British Academy Film Awards. Roger Deakins was a nominee for Best Cinematography at the 95th Academy Awards.

== Plot ==
In 1980, Hilary Small works as a duty manager at the "Empire Cinema", Margate, on the north coast of the English county of Kent. Hilary struggles with bipolar disorder, lives alone, has been prescribed lithium by her GP, and is having extramarital sex with her boss Donald Ellis.

New employee Stephen, who is Black British and lives with his mother Delia, a nurse, starts his new job at the cinema. Hilary is taken with the handsome and charming Stephen, and the two bond when she shows him the cinema's beautiful but disused upper floor. Hilary becomes jealous when Stephen begins hanging out with Janine, a younger employee. While watching New Year's Eve fireworks from the cinema roof, Hilary impulsively kisses Stephen. The two of them begin a sexual relationship. Hilary cuts off Donald and, happy about the new relationship, stops taking her medication.

Hilary sees Stephen being harassed by a group of skinheads on the street and later deal with a racist customer and Stephen confides in her about the racism he faces. Hilary and Stephen go to the beach, where Stephen tells her about his first love, Ruby, who works at the same hospital as his mother. When Stephen asks about her past, she goes on an agitated rant about men and angrily destroys a sand castle they had been building. Neil, a colleague, discovers their relationship and warns Stephen of Hilary's mental health. He tells Hilary it would be best if they end their sexual affair. Donald informs the workers that the cinema has been chosen for the regional premiere of Chariots of Fire. At the premiere, a manic Hilary gets on stage and delivers an agitated speech before informing Donald's wife about their affair. Hilary's mental health deteriorates. While Stephen is at her flat checking on her, mental-health authorities break down her door and take her to be re-institutionalised.

Weeks later, back at the theatre, Donald has been replaced and Stephen begins training with Norman, the cinema's projectionist. He runs into Ruby at the cinema, and they start dating again. Hilary is released from the hospital and returns to work. Stephen advises her to see a movie at the cinema, something she has never done. During her welcome-back party, a skinhead crowd looking for trouble marches past the theatre. When they see Stephen, they break in and assault him. Hilary accompanies him to the hospital, where she meets Stephen's mother. As Stephen recovers, Hilary initially stays away. Norman confides in her that he has a son he has not seen in many years because he abandoned his family and advises her not to run away. She visits Stephen in the hospital. His mother tells Hilary that she makes Stephen happy. An overjoyed Hilary rushes back to the theatre and has requests Norman to play any movie for her; Norman picks Being There.

Stephen returns to the cinema but informs Hilary that, following her advice, he has decided to return to college and will be leaving town. Stephen remembers his times with Hilary at a going-away dinner with Ruby and his mother. The two meet in a park, where Hilary gives him a book and finally bids him goodbye. As Stephen leaves on the train, he reads from the book High Windows by Philip Larkin.

== Cast ==
- Olivia Colman as Hilary Small
- Micheal Ward as Stephen Murray
- Colin Firth as Donald Ellis
- Toby Jones as Norman
- Tom Brooke as Neil
- Tanya Moodie as Delia Murray
- Hannah Onslow as Janine
- Crystal Clarke as Ruby
- Monica Dolan as Rosemary Bates
- Sara Stewart as Brenda Ellis
- Ron Cook as Mr Cooper
- Justin Edwards as Jim Booth
- Jamie Whitelaw as Sean

== Production ==
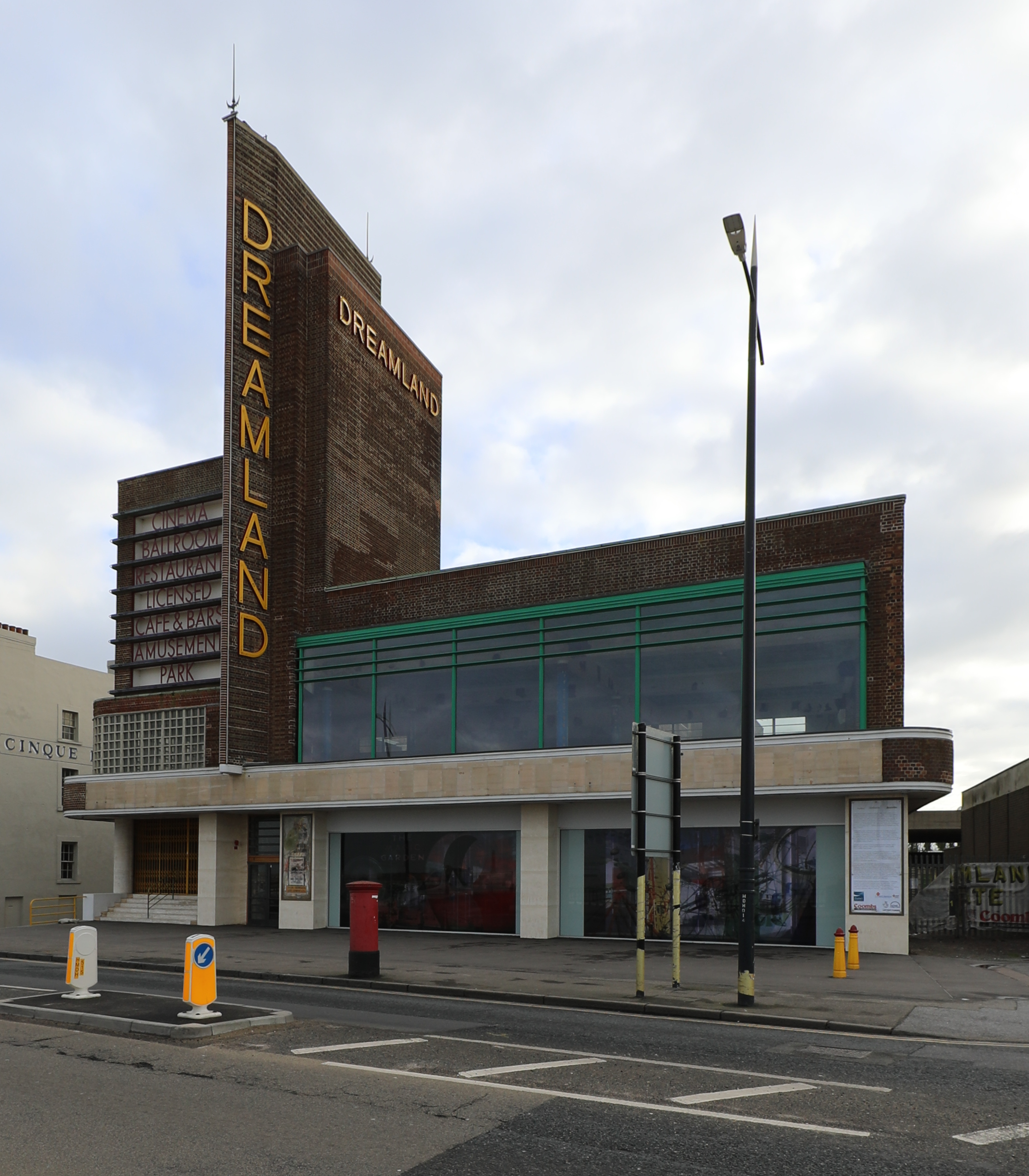
The Dreamland Margate Cinema signage was changed to "Empire Cinema" during production of the film.

It was announced in April 2021 that Sam Mendes had set his next film, which he would write and direct himself at Searchlight Pictures. Olivia Colman was in talks to star and Roger Deakins was announced as cinematographer. Colman was confirmed in July, with Micheal Ward also joining the cast. In December, Colin Firth, Toby Jones, Crystal Clarke and Tanya Moodie were added to the cast. Tom Brooke and Hannah Onslow were confirmed to star in late February. Trent Reznor and Atticus Ross composed the film's score.

Filming began on 7 February 2022 at Margate on the Isle of Thanet in Kent. The Dreamland Margate Cinema building was remodelled and renamed until 15 May 2022.

The film includes several pieces of music that are being played on a record player in the film, such as Bob Dylan's "It's Alright, Ma (I'm Only Bleeding)", Cat Stevens's "Morning Has Broken" and Joni Mitchell's "You Turn Me On, I'm a Radio".

== Release ==
Empire of Light premiered at the Telluride Film Festival on 3 September 2022. It received a limited theatrical release by Searchlight Pictures in the United States on 9 December 2022 and was released theatrically in the United Kingdom on 9 January 2023.

The film was released for VOD on 7 February 2023, followed by a Blu-ray and DVD release on 21 February 2023.

== Reception ==
=== Critical response ===
On the review aggregator website Rotten Tomatoes, 44% of 263 critics gave the film a positive review. The site's critics consensus reads: "Empire of Light contains some fine performances and a few flashes of brilliance, but this tribute to the magic of cinema is disappointingly mundane." On Metacritic, the film has a weighted average score of 54 out of 100, based on 48 critics, indicating "mixed or average reviews". A more favourable review in The Guardian said the film was a "poignant, wonderfully acted drama".

Matt Zoller Seitz of RogerEbert.com, rating the film 2.5 out of 4 stars, wrote that it "starts out a bit dim and unfocused and becomes sharper and more illuminating as it unreels." He also praised Roger Deakins' cinematography and Olivia Colman's performance, but was more critical of the character of Stephen: "[H]e remains an abstraction for too long, to the point where it looks like the film is setting him up as more of a plot device (or sacrificial lamb) than a man. The movie trembles with intimations of impending doom for Stephen, and the dialogue mentions then-recent racial incidents. But [Sam] Mendes presents his anger, fear and distress with the same dissociated stare that freezes Hilary in her tracks when she sees skinheads tormenting Stephen on a sidewalk."

=== Accolades ===
Award	Date of ceremony	Category	Recipient(s)	Result	Ref.
AARP Movies for Grownups Awards	28 January 2023	Best Grownup Love Story	Empire of Light	Nominated	
Academy Awards	12 March 2023	Best Cinematography	Roger Deakins	Nominated	
Alliance of Women Film Journalists	5 January 2023	Best Cinematography	Roger Deakins	Nominated	
American Society of Cinematographers	5 March 2023	Feature Film	Roger Deakins	Nominated	
Black Reel Awards	6 February 2023	Outstanding Supporting Actor	Micheal Ward	Nominated	
Black Reel Awards	6 February 2023	Outstanding Breakthrough Actor	Micheal Ward	Nominated	
British Academy Film Awards	19 February 2023	Best Actor in a Supporting Role	Micheal Ward	Nominated	
British Academy Film Awards	19 February 2023	Outstanding British Film	Sam Mendes and Pippa Harris	Nominated	
British Academy Film Awards	19 February 2023	Best Cinematography	Roger Deakins	Nominated	
Critics' Choice Awards	15 January 2023	Best Cinematography	Roger Deakins	Nominated	
Florida Film Critics Circle	22 December 2022	Best Cinematography	Roger Deakins	Nominated	
Florida Film Critics Circle	22 December 2022	Best Score	Trent Reznor and Atticus Ross	Runner-up	
Golden Globe Awards	10 January 2023	Best Actress in a Motion Picture – Drama	Olivia Colman	Nominated	
Golden Reel Awards	26 February 2023	Outstanding Achievement in Sound Editing – Feature Dialogue / ADR	Oliver Tarney and Rachael Tate	Nominated	
Guild of Music Supervisors Awards	5 March 2023	Best Music Supervision in a Trailer – Film	Matthew Bailey and Shawn Stevens ("Home")	Nominated	
Hollywood Music in Media Awards	16 November 2022	Best Original Score – Feature Film	Trent Reznor and Atticus Ross	Nominated	
Houston Film Critics Society	18 February 2023	Best Original Score	Trent Reznor and Atticus Ross	Nominated	
Las Vegas Film Critics Society	12 December 2022	Best Actress	Olivia Colman	Nominated	
Las Vegas Film Critics Society	12 December 2022	Best Cinematography	Roger Deakins	Nominated	
London Film Critics' Circle	5 February 2023	British Actress of the Year	Olivia Colman (Note: also for Joyride, Puss in Boots: The Last Wish, and Scrooge: A Christmas Carol)	Nominated	
Satellite Awards	3 March 2023	Best Cinematography	Roger Deakins	Nominated	
Satellite Awards	3 March 2023	Best Costume Design	Alexandra Byrne	Nominated	
Toronto International Film Festival	8–18 September 2022	TIFF Ebert Director Award	Sam Mendes	Won	
Washington D.C. Area Film Critics Association	12 December 2022	Best Cinematography	Roger Deakins	Nominated	
Women Film Critics Circle	19 December 2022	Best Screen Couple	Olivia Colman and Micheal Ward	Nominated	
