= P.O.W. (TV series) =

- Also known as: P.O.W; POW
- Genre: War drama
- Created by: Matthew Graham; Matt Jones
- Written by: Matthew Graham; Matt Jones
- Directed by: Roger Gartland; John Strickland
- Starring: James D'Arcy; Anatole Taubman; Ewan Stewart; Shaun Dooley; Craig Heaney; Patrick Baladi; Joe Absolom; Sam Spruell; Marius Jampolskis; Amelia Curtis
- Composer: Debbie Wiseman
- Country of origin: United Kingdom
- Original language: English
- No. of series: 1
- No. of episodes: 6

Production
- Executive producers: George Faber; Matt Jones; Charles Pattinson
- Producers: Victoria Fea; Gary Tuck
- Production location: Lithuania
- Running time: 48 Mins (Without Adverts)
- Production companies: Company Pictures; Company Television

Original release
- Network: ITV
- Release: 10 October – 14 November 2003

Related
- Colditz; Island at War

P.O.W. is a television series consisting of 6 episodes, broadcast on ITV in 2003. The series starred James D'Arcy and Joe Absolom. The drama series is based on true stories, set in Germany in the year 1940 and follows the character of Jim Caddon as he is captured after his plane crashes during a bombing raid over Normandy. In contrast to previous entries in the World War Two prison escape genre such as The Colditz Story, it concentrated on escape attempts by other ranks rather than officers. The title "P.O.W." stands for "prisoner of war".

A second series was not commissioned, though ITV followed it with several other World War Two dramas including Colditz and Island at War.

== Cast ==
- James D'Arcy as Jim Caddon
- Joe Absolom as Drew Pritchard
- Anatole Taubman as Kommandant Dreiber
- Shaun Dooley as Brown
- Ewan Stewart as John Stevens
- Craig Heaney as Larry Boyd
- Patrick Baladi as Captain Attercombe
- Sam Spruell as Wilkes
- Amelia Curtis as Alice Dreiber

== Episodes ==
Title	Directed by	Written by	Original release date
"Episode 1"	John Strickland	Matthew Graham	10 October 2003
Shot down in October 1940, RAF Sgt. Jim Caddon finds himself in the German administered POW camp, Stalag 39. Caddon is a bit of a hot head and ill-tempered about being detained or the order by his senior officer, Capt. Baladi, to cease any escape plans. Caddon gets involved with the escape plans of Sam Shanklin. They will infest the hut with fleas, and secret Shanklin in a mattress while they go to delousing. The Germans burn the mattresses killing Shanklin.
"Episode 2"	John Strickland	Matthew Graham & Stephen Davis	17 October 2003
Fellow POWs are leery of the new arrival, Harry Freeman, when it is learned he is a fluent German speaker. Jim Caddon disagrees. He and Freeman are assigned to a recon mission of the area surrounding Stalag 39. Harry recuses himself at last moment. Caddon reconsiders his opinion about Freeman. Drew Pritchard gets involved in the issue. Cricket eliminates the oxygen supply for the tunnelers.
"Episode 3"	John Strickland	Chris Lang	24 October 2003
When one of the men is found murdered, Capt. Attercombe decides to launch his own investigation and keep the death a secret from Kommandant Dreiber. The dead man had recently received a letter from his girlfriend telling him she had married a local police constable. He was deeply humiliated and had threatened several of his fellow prisoners about not telling anyone about the situation. When Robbie Crane confesses to the crime, he is to be turned over to the camp authorities, but Drew Pritchard has a better solution. With the assistance of another man, Crane escapes.
"Episode 4"	Roger Gartland	Clive Dawson	31 October 2003
When told by Captain Attercombe that he has been taken off the escape list and will not be accompanying those using the tunnel, Jim Caddon decides the time has come to make a break for it. Unexpectedly joined by Larry Boyd, they decide to follow the same route to be used by those who will soon escape through the tunnel. It does not take long for the Germans to realize the men have escaped and a Gestapo officer leads the hunt. Caddon is wounded during the escape. He is healed by Hanna, a German woman who has no loyalty to the Nazis. They end up having sex, but Caddon is betrayed the next morning by a Nazi-loyal friend of Hanna. Caddon makes a run for it, running into Boyd. The two are caught by Feltmann of the Gestapo. Feltmann non-fatally shoots Boyd and Caddon strangles him to death with his own shotgun. When Caddon and Boyd realize that their mates will be walking into a trap, they have to decide whether to give themselves up and return to the camp to warn them.
"Episode 5"	Roger Gartland	Tom Grieves	7 November 2003
The Gestapo have determined that a downed airman POW is an enemy spy. Three new arrivals are suspected and are brutally interrogated. Jim Caddon is one of them. None will confess. Gestapo officer, Major Stahl, decides to execute prisoners until someone comes forward. Caddon goes on a very special mission.
"Episode 6"	Roger Gartland	Matthew Graham	14 November 2003
The POWs learn from their radio the camp is to experience a massive air raid. They believe it an opportunity to stage a mass escape via their incomplete tunnel. While they push to complete the short distance into the woods their plans change when there is a but a cave-in. Drew Pritchard determines to continue with an escape by stealing a travel pass from Kommandant Dreibers' office. Dreiber subjects Pritchard to interrogation to determine what is going on.

== Production ==
The series was filmed in Lithuania and first broadcast on television on 10 October 2003.

== Home release ==
After the series aired it was released on DVD, by Acorn Media UK, containing the following extras:

- Production notes
- Picture gallery
- Interactive menus
- Scene selection
- P.O.W. Hooch recipe
- Cast filmographies
- P.O.W. slang dictionary
