= Blood Moon (2014 film) =

- Poster
- Directed by: Jeremy Wooding
- Written by: Alan Wightman
- Produced by: Jeremy Wooding; Michael Vine
- Starring: George Blagden; Tom Cotcher
- Cinematography: Jono Smith
- Edited by: Kant Pan
- Music by: Toby Pitman
- Production company: Uncork'd Entertainment
- Release date: August 25, 2014 (FrightFest)
- Running time: 90 minutes
- Country: United Kingdom
- Language: English

Blood Moon is a 2014 British horror Western film produced and directed by Jeremy Wooding. The film premiered at the 2014 Film4 FrightFest.

== Plot ==
In 1887, Colorado, three men & two women are traveling on a horse-drawn stagecoach, heading for Denver by way of a nearby mining town. A fourth man, a gunslinger, joins them on the way, his horse having broken its leg. By the time they reach the town, they find it deserted, with a blood-red moon in the sky. During the night, they are attacked by two outlaws who have just robbed a bank and are fleeing the law. However, before long, both groups find themselves under attack from a far more dangerous threat. One by one, they are all killed.

== Cast ==
- George Blagden as Jake Norman
- Tom Cotcher as Lloyd Walker
- Barrington de la Roche as Ahiga
- Raffaello Degruttola as Jeb Norton
- Shaun Dooley as Calhoun
- Jack Fox as Wade
- Dave Fulton as Glen
- Corey Johnson as Hank Norton
- Tony Law as Yancy
- Eleanor Matsuura as Black Deer
- Amber Jean Rowan as Sarah Norman
- Kerry Shale as Father Domenic
- Anna Skellern as Marie
- David Sterne as Charlie Packham
- Joan Walker as Joanie Loumis
- Ben Warwick as Taylor
- George Webster as Henry Lester
- Ian Whyte as skinwalker

== Reception ==
Zoe Rose Smith of Scream magazine wrote "Blood Moon's biggest flaw was that it lacked any real plot line that could have surprised me or possibly made me want to discuss it with someone". Writing for Screen International, Kim Newman called it "a rare serious entry in the 'steak and kidney western' sub-category and combines elements from classic American cowboy films with a Native American spin on the werewolf legend". Phil Wheat of Nerdly called the film "a surprisingly great monster movie", while Jennie Kermode of Eye for Film, who reviewed its DVD release wrote that "[the film] falls short on ambition, but there's still plenty here to enjoy".

A rank of 65 out of a 100 was awarded to Blood Moon by Culture Crypt.

According to Bob Brinkman of the Horror News Network "Blood Moon is truly a great film".
