= Privates (TV series) =

- Genre: Drama
- Written by: Damian Wayling
- Directed by: Bryn Higgins
- Starring: Alexander Vlahos; Jack Fox; Billy Seymour; Ross Anderson; Sam Swann; Matthew Aubrey; Conor MacNeill; David Kirkbride
- Country of origin: United Kingdom
- Original language: English
- No. of series: 1
- No. of episodes: 5

Production
- Producer: Nick Pitt
- Production location: Yorkshire
- Running time: 45 minutes
- Production company: Twenty Twenty Television

Original release
- Network: BBC One
- Release: 7 January – 11 January 2013

Privates is a 2013 BBC One drama television series set in 1960. It follows the stories of eight privates who are part of the last intake of National Service, and their relationships with their officers and non-commissioned officers, civilian staff and families. The series was written by Damian Wayling, directed by Bryn Higgins and produced by Nick Pitt.

The setting is the fictional North Yorkshire Regiment, although the characters are from a variety of backgrounds including London, Liverpool, Scotland, Wales and Northern Ireland. Filmed in Northern Ireland, extras were provided by soldiers, wives and families of 2nd Battalion, The Rifles. Locations included Ballykinler Army Base, Tyrella Beach and South Promenade Newcastle.

== Cast ==
- Alexander Vlahos as Private Tom Keenan
- Jack Fox as Private White-Bowne
- Billy Seymour as Private Eddie Wratten
- Ross Anderson as Private Gordon Lomax
- Sam Swann as Private Rothman
- Matthew Aubrey as Private Owen Davies
- Conor MacNeill as Private McIllvenny
- David Kirkbride as Private Hoy
- Marc Silcock as Lance Corporal Jimmy Hobbs
- Phil McKee as Corporal Barrowman
- Michael Nardone as Sergeant Michael Butcher
- Richard Katz as Captain Viktor Bulgakov
- Patrick Baladi as Captain Colin Gulliver
- Emma Stansfield as Audrey Gulliver
- Sara Vickers as Connie Charles
- Sasha Frost as Norah Preston

=== Character profiles ===
- Private White Bowne is an educated upper class conservative. He was a member of the Officers' Training Corps (presumably whilst at university or Eton). He hates the fact he has been called up as he has no interest in serving in the army or becoming an officer. White-Bowne claims to have an 'escape plan', which in episode 2 is revealed (after he steals use of the Captain's phone) to involve the Conservative Association of the area he lives in. The rest of the section have a love/hate relationship with White-Bowne, his perceived natural superiority doesn't quite wash with the men of Two Section, and his activities often result in the belittling of section members.
- Private Wratten is a streetwise, smartly dressed young male. His accent and clues in his dialogue suggest he is from London. When asked by the Corporal and Sergeants if he has had any form of training from a military institution, he claims to be part of "The Firm", a gang led by the infamous Kray Twins but it is unknown whether this is true or bravado. In episode 2 it is revealed he has a young son, as questioning by Private White-Bowne reveals.
- Norah Preston is the fiancée of Lance Corporal Hobbs, and works on the base. Her relationship with Lance Corporal Hobbs is controversial in 1960's Britain due to her ethnicity, although the only people that show any form of objection are allegedly Hobbs's parents as she appears to be popular with both NAAFI staff as well as soldiers and officers. However the army care not for her race and are one of her employers. However, her father, a former soldier in the British Army emigrated to the United States following his ill-treatment he was subject to whilst completing his service due to his race and ethnicity. She deceitfully hides the offer of amnesty the army offers her fiancée Norah tries to emigrate to Liverpool, and later the United States, with her AWOL fiancée but is left standing at the station whilst Hobbs returns to the base.

== Episode list ==
No.	Title	Directed by	Written by	Original release date
1	"Episode One"	Bryn Higgins	Damian Wayling	7 January 2013
Lance Corporal Jimmy Hobbs proposes to his girlfriend Norah, who works in the army canteen (NAAFI), and then goes AWOL after being chased by Private Keenan. Sergeant Butcher sees a man by his motorbike on the pier, dressed in a homemade general's uniform and speaking only in the dialogue of David Niven; he is Private Lomax. Corporal Barrowman, having taken a dislike to Private Wratten, initiates a search for a 'stolen' watch and pronounces Wratten the thief. After lights out, the men deal with dislocation in their own way: Keenan writes in his journal, Hoy cries and Lomax is nowhere to be seen.
2	"Episode Two"	Bryn Higgins	Damian Wayling	8 January 2013
Lomax fakes taking the sedative that Nurse Connie gave him and much to her surprise suddenly starts to speak like Bette Davis. Jimmy tells Norah he has a plan. Keenan apologizes to Connie for being strident about his pacifist views last time they met and asks Connie if they could talk, somewhere private. Two Section undergoes bayonet training. It's a visceral process and most do it badly. It prompts Davies to wonder if he has what it takes to be a soldier. Sergeant Butcher visits a woman at the Imperial Hotel in nearby Ravensea.
3	"Episode Three"	Bryn Higgins	Damian Wayling	9 January 2013
Two Section is on the assault course. Barrowman tells the men that if they beat One Section's time they will get a crate of beer: if they don't, they will be peeling spuds for the regimental dinner that evening. White-Bowne tells Captain Gulliver that he is standing in the Oldham East by-election and will thus get exemption from National Service. Hobbs, waiting in an army cell after being AWOL, fears the worst. Lomax hides a wrapped package under his pillow. Keenan and Connie have dinner together.
4	"Episode Four"	Bryn Higgins	Damian Wayling	10 January 2013
Barrowman continues training with Two Section and simulates a gas attack, during which Wrattan collapses. While the sections wait by the barrack room clock for their leave to begin, the nuclear attack warning sounds. Barrowman and Hobbs salute the impending Armageddon with a bottle of whisky. Hobbs, now slightly drunk, confronts Norah about their relationship. White-Bowne has found out that Barrowman used to be a sergeant and thinks Hobbs might know the story of why he was demoted to corporal.
5	"Episode Five"	Bryn Higgins	Damian Wayling	11 January 2013
Preparations for the Remembrance Day parade begin as a telegram arrives telling that Davies' grandfather has died, the one his family had suspected of being a coward. Captain Gulliver tells Audrey that their life will begin anew when he hands in his resignation that day. Wratten visits Barrowman in hospital and Barrowman tells his story. Keenan's curiosity about Davies' grandfather leads him to uncover the truth about the grandfather's army record. White-Bowne and Rothman appear in front of the Conservative selection panel and make their respective pitches to be the next candidate. Sergeant Butcher asks Captain Bulgakov whether Lomax is really mad or just faking it.
