= Great Britain ice hockey team =

Great Britain ice hockey team may refer to:

- Great Britain men's national ice hockey team
- Great Britain women's national ice hockey team
