= Crystal Clarke =

American actress

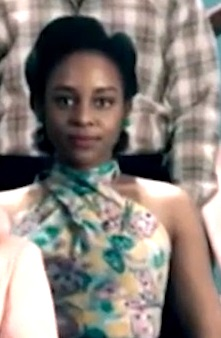
- Clarke in Ordeal by Innocence 2018
- Born: 1993/1994; New Jersey, U.S.
- Education: Royal Conservatoire
- Occupation: Actress
- Years active: 2013–present

Crystal Clarke (born 1993 or 1994) is an American actress. She is best known for her roles as Tina Argyll in the BBC and Amazon Prime miniseries Ordeal by Innocence (2018) and Georgiana Lambe in the ITV and PBS adaptation of the Jane Austen novel Sanditon (2019–2023).

== Early life ==
Clarke was born and raised in Essex County, New Jersey, to Caribbean parents; her mother is from Trinidad and her father was from Guyana. She has one older brother. Clarke attended Newark Arts High School, graduating in 2011. She also spent part of her childhood in Tennessee. Clarke made the decision to leave the United States to pursue acting because she felt her race and class put her at a disadvantage. Clarke moved to Glasgow to attend the Royal Conservatoire and graduated in 2014.

== Career ==
Clarke made her West End theatre debut as Hester Worsley in Dominic Dromgoole's revival of A Woman of No Importance. She had roles in the Force Awakens, and Last Jedi installments of Star Wars. She, Lupita Nyong'o and Maisie Richardson-Sellers were the first three black actresses to appear in a Star Wars film in the former. She also appeared in the 2019 Black Mirror episode "Smithereens" and the Channel 5 film Agatha and the Curse of Ishtar.*

Clarke played Tina Argyll in the 2018 mini-series adaptation of Agatha Christie's Ordeal by Innocence. In 2019, Clarke began starring as Miss Georgiana Lambe in the ITV and Masterpiece adaptation of Jane Austen's novel Sanditon. Lambe is the only black character written by Austen. In 2022, Clarke played Magali in The King's Daughter. The same year, she appeared in Sam Mendes' romantic drama film Empire of Light. In 2023, she played Amber (Ruby) Bradfield in Blindspot, a four-part UK series.

== Filmography ==
=== Film ===
Key
†	Denotes works that have not yet been released

Year	Title	Role
2015	Woman in Gold	Cashier
2015	Star Wars: The Force Awakens	Ensign Goode
2016	Assassin's Creed	Samia
2017	Star Wars: The Last Jedi	Resistance Transport Pilot
2021	The Electrical Life of Louis Wain	Alicia Simmonds
2022	The King's Daughter	Magali
2022	Empire of Light	Ruby

=== Television ===
Year	Title	Role	Notes
2018	Ordeal by Innocence	Tina Argyll	Miniseries
2019	Black Mirror	Tipi	Episode: "Smithereens"
2019	Agatha and the Curse of Ishtar	Pearl Theroux	Television film
2019–2023	Sanditon	Miss Georgiana Lambe	Main role
2020	Roadkill	Nadia Baker	2 episodes

=== Video games ===
Year	Title	Role	Notes
2016	Star Ocean: Anamnesis	Sophia	English version

== Stage ==
Year	Title	Role	Notes
2014	The Gamblers	Krugel	Tour
2017	A Woman of No Importance	Hester Worsley	Vaudeville Theatre, London
