= Naji Abu Nowar =

British-Jordanian filmmaker

Naji Abu Nowar ناجي أبو نوار
- Born: 1981 (age 44–45); Oxford, United Kingdom
- Education: King's College London
- Occupation: Film director
- Years active: 2009–present
- Awards: Outstanding Debut by a British Writer, Director or Producer

Naji Abu Nowar (Arabic: ناجي أبو نوار; born 1981) is a British-Jordanian film director, writer and producer. Best known for his works Death of a Boxer (2009), Till Death (2012) and Theeb (2014) for which he received wide spread acclaim and recognition, including a Best Foreign Language Film nomination at 88th Academy Awards, nomination for Best film not in the English language, and the BAFTA Award for Outstanding Debut by a British Writer, Director or Producer at the 69th British Academy Film Awards. Theeb is the first Jordanian film to receive an Oscar nomination.

== Early life and education ==
Abu Nowar was born in Oxford in 1981, from a Jordanian military family. He is the youngest of thirteen half-siblings. As a child, he heard stories from his father about chivalrous and courageous Bedouin warriors, which later influenced his film making. In an interview with The Times' Kate Maltby, he said: "I’ve always had a sympathy for people caught between different pressures."

When Abu Nowar was 10 years old, his family moved to Jordan. He later returned to England to complete his A Levels and attend King's College London where he focused on war studies. He used some of the strategic and organizational skills acquired at college during the making of his movie, Theeb. Early in his career, Abu Nowar and his friend Rupert Lloyd got jobs laying dance floors. When they won their first BAFTA, they would dance on a floor they had constructed years earlier at the Grosvenor House Hotel.

Abu Nowar returned to Amman in 2004, where he took up residence.

== Career ==
In 2005, Abu Nowar was accepted into the RAWI Screenwriters lab, a project sponsored by the Royal Film Commission and the Sundance Institute to support film makers. With this support, he developed his first screenplay Shakoush (Hammer).

In 2009, Abu Nowar wrote and directed Death of a Boxer, an eight-minute film that appeared at The Palm Springs International Shortest, The Dubai International Film Festival, the Miami Short Film Festival, and the Franco-Arab Film Festival.

Following the success of Death of a Boxer, Abu Nowar had difficulty launching his next project, due to funding issues and ideas that were not strong enough to come to fruition. He had co-written a Bedouin western with Rupert Lloyd in 2003, but it was not until he met producer and screen-writer Bassel Ghandour that the idea for Theeb came together. The two decided to adapt a screenplay, written by Ghandour, into a full-length feature film.

Abu Nowar describes the film Theeb as a "Bedouin Western", with nods to Akira Kurosawa's samurai films and American westerns. During the writing of the film, Abu Nowar, Ghandour and Lloyd lived for a year in Wadi Rum and Wadi Arabeh located in southern Jordan to meet local Bedouins and better understand their folklore in an attempt to portray the people and their way of life authentically. Funding, though inadequate, was secured by private sector investors, as well as several institutions: King Abdullah II fund for development, Doha film institute and Abu Dhabi-based Sanad film fund.

The film, released in 2014, received widespread acclaim and recognition for its success. Abu Nowar dedicated the film to artist and architect Ali Maher, an iconic figure in Jordan. Maher, who offered support to Abu Nowar when he first arrived in Jordan in 2004, died in 2013 and only got to see the movie's trailer.

In February 2015, Abu Nowar was among the honorees who were invited by King Abdullah and Queen Rania to Al Husseiniya Palace, for an event in which the attendees were praised for their entrepreneurship and good citizenship.

Abu Nowar has plans for future films and hopes to feature Bedouin women, which was previously frowned upon by the Bedouin community.

== Work ==
- Death of a Boxer (2009)
- Theeb (2014)

== Awards ==
He received following awards and nominations for films

=== For Theeb ===
- 2014: Venice Film Festival
  - Venice Horizons Award (Best Director) – won
  - Venice Horizons Award (Best Film) – nom
- 2014: Tokyo Filmex
  - Grand Prize – nom
- 2014: London Film Festival
  - Sutherland Award (First Feature Competition) – nom
- 2014: Camerimage
  - Best Directorial Debut – won
- 2014: Cairo International Film Festival
  - Jury Prize for Best Cinematography and Artistic Direction – won
- 2014: Abu Dhabi Film Festival
  - FIPRESCI Prize (Best Narrative Film) – won
  - New Horizons Competition (Best Film from the Arab World) – won
  - Black Pearl Award (New Horizons Competition) – nom
- 2015: Palm Springs International Film Festival
  - New Voices/New Visions Grand Jury Prize – nom
- 2015: Munich Film Festival
  - CineVision Award (Best Film By An Emerging Director) – nom
- 2015: Glasgow Film Festival
  - Audience Award – nom
- 2015: Fribourg International Film Festival
  - Grand Pix – nom
- 2015: FEST International Film Festival
  - Belgrade Victor (Best Film) – won
  - Audience Award (Best Script) – won
- 2015: Buenos Aires International Festival of Independent Cinema
  - Best Film (International Competition) – nom
- 2016: BAFTA Awards
  - Outstanding Debut by a British Writer, Director or Producer – won
  - Best Film Not in the English Language – nom
- 2016: Academy Awards
  - Best Foreign Language Film – nom

=== For Death of a Boxer ===
- 2009: Dubai International Film Festival
  - Muhr Arab Award – (Short) – nom
