= Trevor Rees-Jones (bodyguard) =

British author and former bodyguard (born 1968)

- Born: Trevor Rees; 3 March 1968 (age 58); Rinteln, West Germany
- Occupation: Author
- Known for: Death of Diana, Princess of Wales
- Spouses: Sue Jones (m. 1995; div. 1997) Ann Scott (m. 2003)

Trevor Rees-Jones (also known as Trevor Rees; born 3 March 1968) is a British author and former bodyguard who was badly injured and the only survivor in the car crash in Paris that killed Diana, Princess of Wales, in 1997. Because he sustained a serious head injury, Rees-Jones does not recall any details from the crash.

Some media reports claimed that Rees-Jones was wearing a seat belt and survived, but investigations revealed that none of the occupants of the car were wearing a seat belt.

== Early life ==
Trevor Rees-Jones was born on 3 March 1968 in Rinteln, West Germany, the middle-born of three boys of Colin Rees, a surgeon in the British Army, and Gill, a nurse. He has an older brother, Gareth, and younger brother, John. At age 10, Rees-Jones returned with his family to Oswestry, Shropshire near his father's childhood home. At Fitzalan High School, Rees-Jones enrolled in the Combined Cadet Force.

== Military career and first marriage ==
In 1987, Rees-Jones enlisted in the 1st Battalion of the Parachute Regiment, served one tour of duty in Northern Ireland and was awarded the General Service Medal.

On 12 August 1995, Rees-Jones married his first wife, Sue Jones, in Oswestry, where the couple had met at Fitzalan High School. He filed for divorce in June 1997.

== Car crash, injuries, and aftermath ==
On 31 August 1997, Rees-Jones was seriously injured in the car crash in the Pont de l'Alma tunnel in Paris, France that resulted in the death of Diana, Princess of Wales. The princess's companion, Dodi Fayed, and their chauffeur, Henri Paul, were found dead inside the car; Rees-Jones was the sole survivor of the crash. He was conscious after the crash, but his face was flattened, with numerous bones broken or crushed, and was reconstructed afterwards with old family photographs for guidance by French facial doctor Luc Chikhani, with about 150 pieces of titanium to hold the bones together and to recreate the former shape. Within about one year, Rees-Jones' face was nearly back to normal.

Hospital care costs were paid by Dodi's father, Mohamed Al-Fayed, Rees-Jones' employer at the time of the crash, and the rest by the British National Health Service (NHS). At first, it was widely rumoured that Rees-Jones had lost his tongue in the crash, but this was not true. He underwent a ten-hour operation to restore his jaw to its former condition.

After spending more than a month in hospital, Rees-Jones finally returned to the United Kingdom on 3 October 1997. At the time, he was able to communicate only by whispering and writing down answers. Rees-Jones resigned from his job as a bodyguard on 19 May 1998. Al-Fayed was reported as saying that his job would be available if he wished to return.

== Recovery and later life ==
Following recovery from his injuries, Rees-Jones moved back to Oswestry and worked in a shop. He remarried on 15 February 2003, to Ann Scott, a teacher at Belvidere School, Shrewsbury. The ceremony took place in Welshpool, Wales.

Rees-Jones wrote a book, published in 2000 and titled The Bodyguard's Story: Diana, the Crash, and the Sole Survivor (ISBN 0-446-61004-6), about his experiences, with the help of ghostwriter Moira Johnston. The book reconstructed the events from Rees-Jones's partial memories and those of his family and friends.

== In popular culture ==
Rees-Jones is portrayed by actor Harry Anton in season 6 of the TV series The Crown.
