= Cinema of Luxembourg =

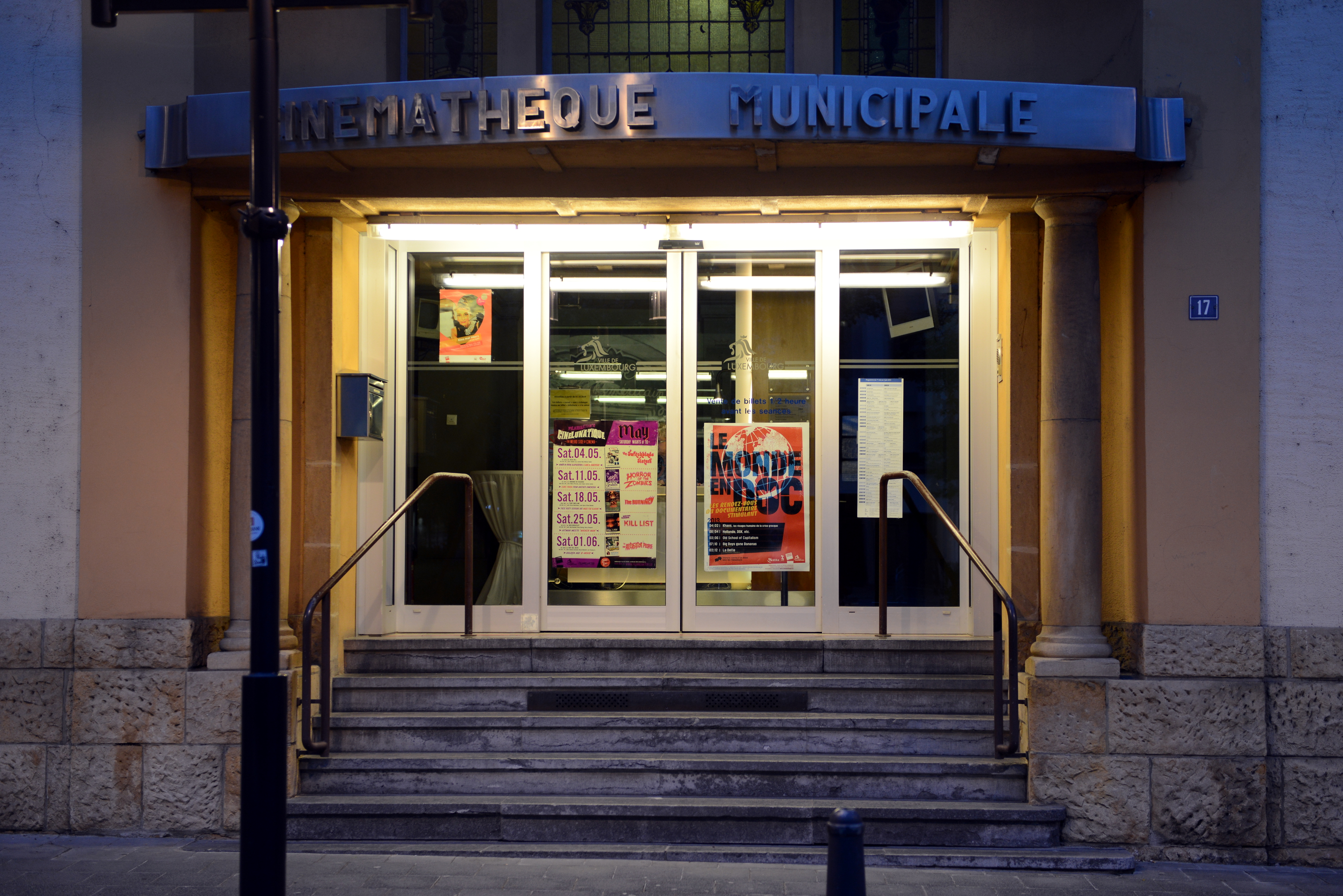
- Cinémathèque de la Ville de Luxembourg
- No. of screens: 33 (2011)
  - Per capita: 7.1 per 100,000 (2011)

Produced feature films (2011)
- Fictional: 13 (81.3%)
- Animated: 1 (6.3%)
- Documentary: 2 (12.5%)

Number of admissions (2011)
- Total: 1,280,000
  - Per capita: 2.4 (2012)

Gross box office (2011)
- Total: €9.4 million

The Luxembourgish film industry is quite small. However, many films have been made in the country, both by native filmmakers and by people from other countries.

In 1993, Dammentour by Paul Scheuer (AFO-Productions) and Hochzäitsnuecht (Paul Cruchten) won awards at the Max Ophüls Festival in Saarbrücken.

Since 2003, the Luxembourg Film Award is awarded for the best productions of Luxembourgish cinema.

== List of native feature films made in Luxembourg (selection) ==
- L'amour, oui! mais...(1970) directed by Philippe Schneider
- Wat huet e gesot? (1981) directed by Paul Scheuer, Georges Fautsch and Maisy Hausemer
- When the Music's Over (1981) directed by Andy Bausch (8 mm)
- E Fall fir sech (1984) directed by Menn Bodson and Marc Olinger starring Josiane Peiffer and René Pütz
- Congé fir e Mord (1983) directed by Paul Scheuer starring Josiane Peiffer and Paul Scheuer
- Déi zwéi vum Bierg (1985) directed by Menn Bodson, Gast Rollinger and Marc Olinger starring Fernand Fox
- Gwyncilla, Legend of Dark Ages (1986) directed by Andy Bausch starring Géraldine Karier and Thierry van Werveke
- Die Reise das Land (1986) directed by Paul Kieffer and Fränk Hoffmann starring Mathias Kniesbeck and André Jung
- Troublemaker (1988) directed by Andy Bausch starring Thierry van Werveke and Jochen Senf
- De falschen Hond (1989) directed by Menn Bodson, Gast Rollinger and Marc Olinger starring André Jung
- Mumm Sweet Mumm (1989) directed by Paul Scheuer, Georges Fautsch and Maisy Hausemer starring Josiane Peiffer
- A Wopbopaloobop A Lopbamboom (1989) directed by Andy Bausch starring Désirée Nosbusch, Sabine Berg and Thierry van Werveke
- Schacko Klak (1990) directed by Paul Kieffer and Fränk Hoffmann starring André Jung, Paul Greisch and Myriam Muller
- Hochzäitsnuecht (1992) directed by Pol Cruchten starring Myriam Muller and Thierry van Werveke
- Dammentour (1992) directed by Paul Scheuer, Georges Fautsch and Maisy Hausemer starring Josiane Peiffer and Germain Wagner
- Three Shake-a-leg Steps to Heaven (1993) directed by Andy Bausch starring Thierry van Werweke, Udo Kier, Eddie Constantine and Désirée Nosbusch
- Back in Trouble (1997) directed by Andy Bausch starring Thierry van Werveke and Moritz Bleibtreu
- Le Club des Chômeurs (2001) directed by Andy Bausch starring Thierry van Werveke, André Jung and Myriam Muller
- Rendolepsis (2003) directed by Marc Barnig
- La Revanche (2004) directed by Andy Bausch starring Thierry van Werveke, André Jung and Sascha Ley
- Zombie Film (2005) directed by Patrick Ernzer & Mike Tereba
- Perl oder Pica (2006) directed by Pol Cruchten
- E Liewe laang (1991) directed by Marc Olinger
- Who's Quentin? (2006) directed by Sacha Bachim
- Reste bien, mec! (2009) directed by Adolf El Assal
- The Treasure Knights and the Secret of Melusina (2012)
- Heemwéi (2014) directed by Sacha Bachim
- Mammejong (2015) directed by Jacques Molitor
- Baby(a)lone (2015) directed by Donato Rotunno
- Eng nei Zäit (2015) directed by Christophe Wagner
- Voices from Chernobyl (2016) directed by Pol Cruchten
- Kropemann (2016) directed by Patrick Ernzer
- Rusty Boys (2017) directed by Andy Bausch
- Gutland (2017) directed by Govinda Van Maele
- De Superjhemp retörns (2018) directed by Félix Koch
- Péitruss (2019) directed by Max Jacoby
- De Buttek (2019) directed by Luc Feit

== List of native documentary films made in Luxembourg (selection) ==
- Il est un petit pays (1937) directed by René Leclère
- Hamilius: Hip Hop Culture in Luxembourg (2010)

== List of foreign films made in Luxembourg (selection) ==
=== Canada ===
- Falling Through (2000) - directed by Colin Bucksey and starring James West and Marjo Baayen

=== France ===
- Une liaison pornographique (1999) - directed by Frédéric Fonteyne and starring Nathalie Baye and Sergi López
- Elles (1997) directed by Luis Galvão Teles starring Miou-Miou, Marthe Keller and Marisa Berenson

=== United Kingdom ===
- 8½ Women (1999) - directed by Peter Greenaway and starring John Standing and Matthew Delamere
- Dog Soldiers (2002) - directed by Neil Marshall and starring Kevin McKidd and Sean Pertwee

=== United States ===
- The Diva of Mars (1980) - directed by Andy Chagny
- A House in the Hills (1993) - directed by Ken Wiederhorn and starring Michael Madsen and Helen Slater
- An American Werewolf in Paris (1997) - directed by Anthony Waller and starring Tom Everett Scott and Julie Delpy
- The First 9½ Weeks (1998) - directed by Alex Wright and starring Paul Mercurio, Clara Bellar, and Malcolm McDowell
- Fortress 2 (1999) - directed by Geoff Murphy and starring Christophe Lambert
- The New Adventures of Pinocchio (1999) - directed by Michael Anderson
- New World Disorder (1999) - directed by Richard Spence and starring Rutger Hauer, Andrew McCarthy, and Tara FitzGerald
- Wing Commander (1999) - directed by Chris Roberts and starring Freddie Prinze, Jr., Saffron Burrows, and Matthew Lillard
- Shadow of the Vampire (2000) - directed by E. Elias Merhige and starring John Malkovich and Willem Dafoe
- CQ (2001) - directed by Roman Coppola and starring Jeremy Davies and Angela Lindvall
- The Girl with a Pearl Earring (2003) - directed by Peter Webber and starring Scarlett Johansson, Colin Firth, Tom Wilkinson and Cillian Murphy
- The Merchant of Venice (2004) - directed by Michael Radford and starring Al Pacino, Jeremy Irons and Joseph Fiennes
- Retrograde (2004) starring Dolph Lundgren. Film was shot in Italy but partly produced in Luxembourg.

== See also ==
- List of Luxembourgish submissions for the Academy Award for Best International Feature Film
- Cinema of the world
- World cinema
