= List of Luxembourgish films =

This is a list of films produced or filmed in Luxembourg, including numerous films made for television in the country. Many of them may have been co-produced with Germany, France or Belgium.

== A ==
- An American Werewolf in Paris (1997)

== B ==
- Baby(a)lone (2015)
- Babysitting (2001)
- Back in Trouble (1997)
- Le Bal des pantins (2001)
- Barrage (2017)
- Belgique - le charme de l'Ardenne (1922)
- La Belle et la bête (1946)
- Benjamin Blümchen (1997)
- Bernadette (1988)
- Biouel (1996)
- Black Dju (1996)
- Blind Spot (2012)
- Blut in der Spur (1979)
- Bob's Beach (2003) (TV)
- Bracia (2005)
- Brudermord (2005)
- Butterflies (2005/I)
- Bye Bye Blackbird (2005)

== C ==
- Call Her Madam (1998) (V)
- Calvaire (2004)
- Cargo, les hommes perdus. (2007)
- Caught in the Act (2004) (TV)
- La Chambre obscure (2000)
- Chasseurs de dragons (2008)
- Christie Malry's Own Double-Entry (2000)
- Le Club des chômeurs (2001)
- Comme tout le monde (2006)
- Comme t'y es belle! (2006)
- Confessions of an Ugly Stepsister (2002) (TV)
- Corto Maltese, la cour secrète des arcanes (2002)
- CQ (2001)

== D ==
- Deepfrozen (2006)
- Déi zwéi vum Bierg (1985)
- Dog Soldiers (2002)
- Du poil sous les roses (2000)

== E ==
- Ech war am Congo
- L'École de la chair (1998)
- Edelweißpiraten (2004)
- Edward J. Steichen (1995)
- Elegant (2006)
- Elenya (1992)
- Elles (1997)
- The Emperor's Wife (2003)
- The Enemy (2001/I)
- Erè mèla mèla (2001)
- Eros (2004)
- Etre et Vivre Avec (2007)
- Expo 150 - De film (1989)
- Extreme Ops (2002)

== F ==
- Falling Through (2000)
- Fast Film (2003)
- FeardotCom (2002)
- La Femme de Gilles (2004)
- Les Feux follets (2003)
- Le Fils du requin (1993)
- Flawless (2009)
- Flitze Feuerzahn (1997)
- Fortress 2 (1999)
- Les Fourmis rouges (2007)
- Fragile (1998)
- Freigesprochen (2007)

== G ==
- Les Gens qui s'aiment(2000)
- Girl with a Pearl Earring (2003)
- Globi and the Stolen Shadows (2003)
- A Good Woman (2004)
- Goodbye Bafana (2007)
- Gwyncilla: Legend of Dark Ages (1986)

== H ==
- The Headsman (2005)
- Heemwei - Eng Odyssee (2014)
- Heim ins Reich - Wéi Lëtzebuerg sollt preisesch ginn (2004)
- Here Come the Littles (1985)
- Histoire(s) de jeunesse(s) (2001)
- Hochzaeitsnuecht (1992)
- L'Homme au cigare (2003)
- The Hound of London (1993) (TV)
- A House in the Hills (1993)
- House of Boys (2007)
- How the Toys Saved Christmas (1996)
- Hurensohn (2004)

== I ==
- Ice Cream Sundae (2001)
- Il est un petit pays (1937)
- Im Anfang war der Blick (2002)
- In a Dark Place (2006)
- Irina Palm (2007)
- Isabelle (1998)
- Isegrim & Reineke (2004) (TV)
- Istanbul (1985)

== J ==
- J'ai toujours voulu être une sainte (2003)
- Jaime (1999)
- J'aurais voulu être un danseur (2007)
- Je pense à vous (1992)
- La Jungle (2006)

== K ==
- Kirikou et la sorcière (1998)
- Kruistocht in spijkerbroek (2006)

== L ==
- The Last Ashes (2023)
- Lapislazuli: In the Eyes of the Bear (2006)
- Lilacs (2007)
- The Lodge (2004)
- Lorenz im Land der Lügner (1997)
- Love and Virtue (2008)
- Luc et Marie (1995)
- Lumen (2007)

== M ==
- Madame Edouard (2004)
- Maigret et le fou de Sainte Clotilde (2002) (TV)
- Massacre pour une orgie (1966)
- Masz na imie Justine (2005)
- Match Point (2005)
- Max et Bobo (1998)
- Mécanomagie (1996)
- The Merchant of Venice (2004)
- Midnight Man (1995) (TV)
- Minotaur (2006)
- Miss Montigny (2005)
- Mon nom est femme (1968)
- Mondo veneziano (2005)
- Moonlight (2002)
- More (1969)
- The Musketeer (2001)

== N ==
- Nebel (2000)
- The Nebula Dawn (2006)
- Der Neunte Tag (2004)
- Never Die Young (2013)
- New World Disorder (1999)
- Nha fala (2002)
- Nightworld: Lost Souls (1998) (TV)
- No Star (2006)
- Noces (2016) - See A Wedding (at the section "W")
- Nue propriété (2006)
- Nuits d'Arabie (2007)

== O ==
- Octane (2003)
- On Dangerous Ground (1996) (TV)
- On ferme! (1999)
- One Against the Wind (1991) (TV)

== P ==
- Pano ne passera pas (1969)
- Les Perdants n'écrivent pas l'histoire (2001)
- Perl oder Pica (2006)
- Petites misères (2002)
- Pierre Molinier, 7 rue des Faussets (1976)
- The Pillow Book (1996)
- PiperMint (2004)
- The Plot Spoiler (2006)
- The Point Men (2001)
- Le Pont rouge (1991)
- Portrait d'artiste: Charles Kohl (1998)
- Pourquoi se marier le jour de la fin du monde? (2000)
- La Promesse (1996)

== Q ==
- Quatrième palier (1999)

== R ==
- Rag Tale (2005)
- Réfractaire (2008)
- Die Reise das Land (1987)
- Renaissance (2006)
- Rencontre avec le dragon (2003)
- Rendolepsis (2003)
- Retour à Gorée (2007)
- Retrato de Família (1992)
- Retrograde (2004)
- La Revanche (2004)
- The Ride (2002)
- River Tales (2020)
- Roger (1996)
- Le Roman de Renart (2005)

== S ==
- Salut cousin! (1996)
- Save Angel Hope (2007)
- Schacko Klak (1989)
- Schmol (2004)
- Secret Passage (2004)
- Das Sein und das Nichts (2007)
- Les Sept péchés capitaux (1992)
- Le Serpent a mangé la grenouille (1998)
- Something About Pizza (2005)
- Starfly (2005)
- Sub Down (1997)
- Superstition (2001)
- The Safe House (2025), in competition at the 75th Berlin International Film Festival

== T ==
- Tale of the Mummy (1998)
- Le Tango des Rashevski (2003)
- T'Choupi (2004)
- The Tell Tale Heart (2005)
- Tempesta (2004)
- Tempo (2003)
- Terre rouge (1989)
- The Thief Lord (2006)
- Three (2005)
- Three Shake-a-leg Steps to Heaven (1993)
- Timestamp (2025)
- Tour de force (2005)
- Tristan et Iseut (2002)
- Troublemaker (1988)
- The Tulse Luper Suitcases, Part 1: The Moab Story (2003)
- Turandot at the Forbidden City of Beijing (1999) (TV)
- De Tweeling (2002)

== U ==
- Une liaison pornographique (1999)

== V ==
- Le Ventre de Juliette (2003)
- Verrouillage central (2001)
- Victims (2007)
- Villa des Roses (2002)
- Visions of Europe (2004)
- Voices from Chernobyl (2016)

== W ==
- W (2003)
- A Wedding (Noces in French) (2016) - A co-production with Belgium, France, and Pakistan
- Who's Quentin? (2005)
- Wing Commander (1999)
- The Woman Without a Body and the Projectionist (1984)

== Y ==
- Ya Rayah (2000)
- Yoon (2007)
- Your Chicken Died of Hunger (2002)
