= List of Luxembourgish submissions for the Academy Award for Best International Feature Film =

Best International Feature Film submissions from Luxembourg

Highlights
- Debut: 1997
- Submissions: 21
- Nominations: none
- Oscar winners: none

Luxembourg has submitted films for the Academy Award for Best International Feature Film (Note: The category was previously named the Academy Award for Best Foreign Language Film, but this was changed to the Academy Award for Best International Feature Film in April 2019, after the Academy deemed the word "Foreign" to be outdated.) since 1997. The Foreign Language Film award is handed out annually by the United States Academy of Motion Picture Arts and Sciences to a feature-length motion picture produced outside the United States that contains primarily non-English dialogue.

As of 2026, Luxembourg ha submitted twenty films, but none of them have been nominated.

== Submissions ==
The Academy of Motion Picture Arts and Sciences has invited the film industries of various countries to submit their best film for the Academy Award for Best International Feature Film since 1956. The International Feature Film Committee oversees the process and reviews all the submitted films. Following this, they vote via secret ballot to determine the five nominees for the award.

Because of Luxembourg's small size, most submitted films were co-productions with neighboring countries. Pol Cruchten is the most submitted filmmaker, representing the country three times.

In 2006, AMPAS disqualified Your Name is Justine, arguing that Luxembourg did not have sufficient artistic control over the multi-national film, which was directed by a Poland-based Venezuelan filmmaker, set in Germany and Poland, shot mostly in Polish and English but funded primarily by Luxembourg. The film was originally considered to represent Poland, but it failed to make Poland's four-film shortlist that year and it was subsequently selected to represent Luxembourg.

From 2010 to 2012, Luxembourg's Selection Committee met each year and announced that the country would not send a film due to a lack of suitable candidates.

Ever since the controversy of 2006, all of Luxembourg's Oscar submissions have been directed by native-born Luxembourgish directors, with the exception of Tel Aviv on Fire (2019) directed by Sameh Zoabi, a Palestinian filmmaker who holds Israeli citizenship, which was also one of five films shortlisted by Israel. Although set in Israel and the West Bank, it was filmed mostly in Luxembourg with a largely locally based crew.

Below is a list of the films that have been submitted by Luxembourg for review by the academy for the award by year and the respective Academy Awards ceremony.

Year (Ceremony)	Film title used in nomination	Original title	Language(s)	Director(s)	Result
1997 (70th)	Women	Elles	French, Portuguese	Luís Galvão Teles	Not nominated
1998 (71st)	Back in Trouble		Luxembourgish, German	Andy Bausch	Not nominated
2002 (75th)	Dead Man's Hand	Petites misères	French	Philippe Boon & Laurent Brandenbourger	Not nominated
2003 (76th)	I Always Wanted to Be a Saint	J'ai toujours voulu être une sainte	French	Geneviève Mersch	Not nominated
2005 (78th)	Renart the Fox	Le Roman de Renart	French	Thierry Schiel	Not nominated
2006 (79th)	Your Name is Justine	Masz na imię Justine	Polish, English	Franco de Pena	Disqualified
2007 (80th)	Little Secrets	Perl oder Pica	Luxembourgish	Pol Cruchten	Not nominated
2008 (81st)	Nuits d'Arabie		French, Arabic, Luxembourgish	Paul Kieffer	Not nominated
2009 (82nd)	Refractaire	Réfractaire	French	Nicolas Steil	Not nominated
2013 (86th)	Blind Spot	Doudege Wénkel	Luxembourgish	Christophe Wagner	Not nominated
2014 (87th)	Never Die Young		French	Pol Cruchten	Not nominated
2015 (88th)	Baby(a)lone		Luxembourgish	Donato Rotunno	Not nominated
2016 (89th)	Voices from Chernobyl	La supplication	French	Pol Cruchten	Not nominated
2017 (90th)	Barrage		French	Laura Schroeder	Not nominated
2018 (91st)	Gutland		Luxembourgish, German	Govinda Van Maele	Not nominated
2019 (92nd)	Tel Aviv on Fire	תל אביב על האש	Hebrew, Arabic	Sameh Zoabi	Not nominated
2020 (93rd)	River Tales	Cuentos del río	Spanish	Julie Schroell	Not nominated
2021 (94th)	Io sto bene		Italian, French, Luxembourgish	Donato Rotunno	Not nominated
2022 (95th)	Icarus	Icare	French	Carlo Vogele	Not nominated
2023 (96th)	The Last Ashes	Läif a Séil	Luxembourgish	Loïc Tanson	Not nominated
2025 (98th)	Breathing Underwater	Hors d’haleine	French, Luxembourgish, Spanish	Eric Lamhène	Not nominated
2026 (99th)	Child		French, English	Cyrus Neshvad	Pending

== See also ==
- List of Academy Award winners and nominees for Best International Feature Film
- List of Academy Award-winning foreign language films
- Cinema of Luxembourg
