= Tarbouriech =

Tarbouriech is a French surname. Notable people with the surname include:

- Bonnafet Tarbouriech (born 1952), French actor
- Émile Tarbouriech (1811–1885), French politician
- Ernest Tarbouriech (1865–1911), French politician
- Sophie Tarbouriech (born 1964), French control theorist
