= Lale Yavaş =

Swiss and Turkish actress (born 1978)

Lale Yavaş (born 1978 in Brugg) is a Swiss and Turkish actress.

== Biography ==
Born in 1978 in Zürich, she studied arts at the University of Bern. After finishing her studies, she landed roles in Alles wird gut, I was a Swiss banker, and Imbissness. In 2005, she received a lot of praise for her role in the film Zeit der Wünsche, and was subsequently rewarded with the Adolf Grimme Prize for best "new cinematic talent". In 2006, she acted in Der Letzte Zug with Gedeon Burkhard. Her latest role is in famous Luxembourgian director Andy Bausch's Deepfrozen opposite actor Peter Lohmeyer.

Since 2005, she has been playing a coroner in the German crime series Tatort produced by Saarländischer Rundfunk.

== Selected filmography ==
- 2003 — Imbissness
- 2004 — Das Paar im Kahn
- 2005 — Zeit der Wünsche (TV) — Melike
- 2005 — Tatort (TV series)
- 2006 — Tod eines Keilers
- 2006 — The Last Train
- 2006 — Deepfrozen
- 2006 — Hatırla Sevgili (Turkish TV Series)
- 2007 — Güzelliğin On Par’ Etmez
- 2008 — Evet, I Do!

Awards
Preceded by Tilbe Saran	Golden Orange Award for Best Supporting Actress; 2012 for Güzelliğin On Par’ Etmez	Succeeded by incumbent
