= Breathing Underwater =

Breathing underwater or underwater breathing may refer to:

- Aquatic respiration
- Underwater breathing apparatus
- Liquid breathing

== Creative works ==
- Breathing Under Water (film), by Susan Murphy Dermody (1993)
- Breathing Underwater (film), a 2024 Luxembourgish film
- Breathing Underwater, a 2001 novel by Alex Flinn
- Breathing Under Water (album), a 2007 album by Anoushka Shankar and Karsh Kale
- Breathing Underwater (album), a 2009 album by Marié Digby
- "Breathing Underwater", a 2012 song by Metric from Synthetica
- "Breathing Underwater", a 2016 song by Hollywood Principle featured in the Music of Rocket League and the 2017 album Starting Over.
- "Breathing Underwater" (song), by Emeli Sandé (2016)
