= My Voice =

My Voice may refer to:

- My Voice (film), a 2002 international film directed by Flora Gomes
- My Voice (album), a 2017 album by South Korean singer Taeyeon
