= Thierry Van Werveke =

Luxembourgish actor

Thierry van Werveke
- Born: 23 October 1958; Geneva, Switzerland
- Died: 12 January 2009 (aged 50); Luxembourg City, Luxembourg
- Occupation: Actor
- Years active: 1988–2009

Thierry van Werveke (23 October 1958 – 12 January 2009) was a Luxembourgish actor. He appeared in over 60 films and television shows between 1988 and 2009. He starred in Hochzäitsnuecht, which was screened in the Un Certain Regard section at the 1992 Cannes Film Festival.

== Life ==
His first film experiences were in 1982 in Andy Bausch's short film Stefan. After this, he appeared in all of Bausch's films, generally in the starring role. Soon, he came to other directors' attention: he appeared in films by Paul Kieffer (Schacko Klak), Marc Olinger (De falschen Hond) and Pol Cruchten (Hochzäitsnuecht). Abracadabra, by Harry Cleven, was his first film in French. In his role as the Belgian "Henk" in Knockin' on Heaven's Door, a great success in Germany, he became known to the German public.

He regularly appeared in German films, TV films and series. For his role in Offside he received the Adolf-Grimme-Preis in 2008. He also often acted in Luxembourgish theatre productions, often directed by Frank Hoffmann. As the singer of the groups Nazz Nazz, Taboola Rasa and Luxus he also had a loyal following.

The last film in which he had a starring role was inthierryview, filmed by Andy Bausch as a sort of retrospective portrait and homage in 2008, after it had become known that Van Werveke was very ill.

He died on 11 January 2009 at the age of 50.

== Selected filmography ==
- Stefan (1982)
- Lupowitz (1982)
- ... der Däiwel (1984)
- Van Drosselstein (1984)
- Gwyncilla, Legend of Dark Ages (1986)
- Troublemaker (1988) - Jacques Guddebuer
- De falschen Hond (1989) - Le chef des 'Brésiliens'
- A Wopbopaloobop A Lopbamboom (1989) - Petz Zamponi
- Schacko Klak (1989) - Eck
- Heartbreakhotel (1990)
- Abracadabra (1992) - Naze
- Dead Flowers (1992) - Alex
- Hochzäitsnuecht (1992) - Christian
- Three Shake-a-leg Steps to Heaven (1993) - Jängi Jacoby
- Die Rebellion (1993, TV Movie) - Willi
- Wilde Jahre (1994) - Paul
- Hasenjagd (1994) - Berghammer
- I Promise (1994) - Ferri
- Life Is a Bluff (1996) - Pfeife
- Knockin' on Heaven's Door (1997) - Henk - der Belgier
- Back in Trouble (1997) - Johnny Chicago
- Caipiranha (1997) - Jürgen Grabowski
- The Polar Bear (1998) - Norbert
- Kai Rabe gegen die Vatikankiller (1998) - Aufnahmeleiter
- Die 3 Posträuber (1998) - Schräger Otto
- Eduard's Promise (1998)
- Now or Never: Time Is Money (2000) - Josef Mikesch
- Electric theatre (2000, Documentary)
- Nach der Zeit (2000)
- A Goddamn Job (2001) - Jonathan
- Auf Herz und Nieren (2001) - Glotze
- Elephant Heart (2001) - Kopella
- Wolfzeit (2003) - Jean
- Le Club des Chômeurs (2003) - Jerôme Klein dit Géronimo
- La Revanche (2004) - Jérôme Klein
- Elegant (2004, Short)
- Offside (2005) - Baba Can
- The last 50 hours of Frankie Blue (2006, Short)
- Bye Bye Blackbird (2006) - Man on Girder
- Deepfrozen (2006) - Lars
- Tabula rasa (2006, Short) - David
- Perl oder Pica (2006) - Mr. Pendelmeyer
- Freigesprochen (2007) - Hotelier
- Luftbusiness (2007)
- Tausend Ozeane (2008) - Ulrich Willer
- 1½ Knights: In Search of the Ravishing Princess Herzelinde (2008) - Siegfried
- inthierryview (2008)
- Réfractaire (2009) - Edouard
- The Welfare Worker (2009) - Aschwanden
- Robber Girls (2009) - Reisig
- Lingo vino (2009, Short) - Briefträger
