= Luc Schiltz =

Luxembourgish actor (born 1980)

- Born: 16 December 1980 (age 44); Luxembourg
- Occupation: Actor
- Years active: 2007–present
- Known for: Capitani

Luc Schiltz (born 16 December 1980) is a Luxembourgish actor best known to international audiences for his role in the Netflix series Capitani.

== Career ==
From 2003 to 2007, Schiltz studied drama at the Royal Conservatory of Liège, in Belgium. After graduating, he began taking acting jobs, both in theatre and on the screen, working in Luxembourg and Brussels.

In the 2016 edition of the Luxembourg Film Award, he won "Best Artistic Contribution" for his role in the film Eng nei Zäit and in 2021, he was named Best Actor for Capitani.

== Selected filmography ==
=== Film ===
List of film appearances, with year, title, and role shown
Year	Title	Role	Notes
2009	The Boat Race	ER doctor	
2015	The Brand New Testament	doctor	
2015	Eng nei Zäit	Jules	
2016	Team Spirit	Colin Blake	
2021	The Restless	bakery customer	
2023	The Last Ashes	Pier	
2024	Breathing Underwater	Marc	

=== Television ===
List of television appearances, with year, title, and role shown
Year	Title	Role	Notes
2019	Unité 42	Jeff	4 episodes
2019–22	Capitani	Luc Capitani	24 episodes
2020	Cellule de crise	Mathias Adler	6 episodes
