= Pétur Óskar Sigurðsson =

Icelandic actor and musician (b. 1984)

- Born: 21 August 1984 (age 41); Luxembourg
- Occupations: Actor; musician; footballer

Pétur Óskar Sigurðsson (born 21 August 1984) is an Icelandic actor and musician and a former football player in the Besta deild karla league. He has played on stage in Germany, Iceland and Poland, among others, and has appeared in television series such as Tatort and Das Traumschiff.

== Biography ==
Pétur Óskar was born in Luxembourg on 21 August 1984. He played football professionally from 2002 for several football clubs. He was forward for FH Hafnarfjörður, the Icelandic Champion in 2006, Breiðablik and ÍBV Vestmannaeyjar. He moved to ÍR Reykjavík in 2010. He belonged briefly to the Iceland men's national under-21 football team. During the 2010–11 season, he had to give up his football career due to injuries.

He moved to Paris where he trained acting at the Cours Florent drama school from 2010 to 2013. He studied further at a workshop of the Schaubühne am Lehniner Platz in Berlin held by Thomas Ostermeier and Falk Richter. He played at the F.I.N.D. – Festival Internationale Neue Dramatik of the Schaubühne and at the Tjarnabíó Theatre in Reykjavík, among others. He played as a guest at the Gdańsk Shakespeare Theatre in 2023.

He participated in short films from 2012, followed by roles in feature films. In the 2018/19 season he was a member of the recurring cast of the second season of the television series Trapped. In 2019 he played in the Luxembourg crime series Capitani. In the 2024 Tatort episode Borowski und der Wiedergänger, he played the womaniser Tobias Exner alongside Cordelia Wege as his wife Greta. He portrayed the mysterious Jon in an Iceland episode of the Das Traumschiff series, first aired Easter 2026.

As a musician, he uses the stage name Oscar Leone, producing indie rock songs with country elements. He appeared at the Rockhal in Esch-sur-Alzette in 2021, and played for the opening of the Stade de Luxembourg.

Pétur Óskar is fluent in Icelandic, German, French, English and Luxembourgish; he is a resident of Reykjavík and Berlin.
