= Luxembourg Film Award =

Luxembourg Film Award Lëtzebuerger Filmpräis
- Logo of the award
- Awarded for: Excellence in Luxembourgish cinema
- Country: Luxembourg
- Presented by: d'Filmakademie
- First award: 2003
- Website: www.filmprais.lu

The Luxembourg Film Award (officially in Luxembourgish: Lëtzebuerger Filmpräis) is a film award to honour the best in the cinema of Luxembourg. It has been awarded every two years since 2003.

It is organised by the Luxembourg film academy D'Filmakademie.

== Background ==
Between 1997 and 2006, a different festival specialised in fantasy films was organised in the country, the Cinénygma Luxembourg International Film Festival. Awards were already presented during this festival, albeit not specifically to films produced in Luxembourg.

The Luxembourg Film Award was created in 2003, not only to reward the best productions of the local film industry, but also "to highlight quality works, to encourage film creation, to promote the development of the film industry in Luxembourg and to draw public attention to Luxembourg productions." For this reason, the Luxembourg State plays a role in the organisation of the film award. The first edition was organised jointly by the Film Fund Luxembourg, which depends on the Ministry of Communication, and the Ministry of Culture.

In principle, the ceremony is organised every two years, because the national film production is not sufficiently large to present the awards every year.

In 2021, the award ceremony was live streamed for the first time on rtl.lu. Already in 2003, there had been discussion of broadcasting the ceremony on TV. Between 2012 and 2016 it was organised simultaneously with the Luxembourg City Film Festival.

A jury selected the award winners in the different categories during the first five editions. These categories were "Best Luxembourgian Film", "Best Short Film", "Best Co-Production" and "Best Artistic Contribution" and "Best Technical Contribution". These categories reflect the nature of the film industry in Luxembourg, in which many films are produced jointly with production companies in other countries. Nominees in the category "Best Artistic Contribution" came from diverse professions, including editing, cinematography and production design, while actors, directors and screenwriters could be nominated in the category "Best Technical Contribution".

The most prestigious prize of the "Best Luxembourgian Film" has evolved over time. During the first couple editions, both feature films and documentaries could be awarded. In 2007, it was split and awarded for both types of films, before a separate category for "Best Documentary" was introduced for the fourth edition in 2009.

In addition to the five main categories, there were other categories whose winners were not decided by the jury, such as the award for the best newcomer (director or actor) which was awarded by the organising committee, the award for the best European film which was awarded by the press critics, or the public's choice award, for which the public could vote by SMS.

Since the 6th edition in 2014, the jury has been replaced by a vote of the members of the then newly created Luxembourg film academy (D'Filmakademie).

Only in 2018, a category specifically for actors was introduced.

=== Nomination and awarding procedure ===
The winners in the different categories are chosen by the members of the Luxembourg film academy.

To be eligible as an individual, candidates need to have Luxembourgian citizenship or be a resident, be on a list of the Luxembourg Film Fund or have a "proven cultural link with Luxembourg".

Since the 7th edition, the organisers make a pre-selection and not every candidate for which an application was submitted and who was eligible was automatically nominated. This had to be changed because of many nominations: in 2012 74 persons were nominated in the category "Best Artistic Contribution" and 51 persons in the category "Best Artistic Contribution".

Every category needs to have at least three nominees, or the prize may not be awarded in this category. Since 2012, maximum five films or persons are nominated per category.

Against payment of a few, an application for nomination can be submitted for every film that was shown in cinema, on TV or that was released on DVD or shown at a recognised film festival. In 2021, because of the coronavirus pandemic, it was exceptionally possible to nominate works that had only been released online. The costs for submission of an application were 500 Euro for a feature film, which was defined as any film with a length of at least 50 minutes.

=== Award Sculpture ===
The award sculpture was designed in 2003 by the local sculptor Patricia Lippert. It represents the profile of a human face. The logo of the award is a drawing of the sculpture.

== Awards ceremonies ==
The following is a listing of all Magritte Awards ceremonies.

#	Year	Date	"Best Luxembourgian Film" winner	"Best Coproduction" winner
1st	2003	10 October	ex aequo: I Always Wanted to Be a Saint; L'homme au cigare	A Piece of Sky
2nd	2005	14 October	Heim ins Reich	Girl with a Pearl Earring
3rd	2007	30 November	Plein d'essence (Best Documentary); Your Name is Justine (Best Feature Film)	Irina Palm
4th	2009	4 December	House of Boys	Bride Flight
5th	2012	9 March	Hot Hot Hot	Illegal
6th	2014	7 March	Blind Spot	Hannah Arendt
7th	2016	5 March	Tomorrow After the War	The Brand New Testament
8th	2018	22 September	Gutland	A Wedding
9th	2021	26 November	De Superjhemp retörns	Collective
10th	2023	11 November	Kommunioun	Corsage
11th	2025	22 November	Breathing Underwater	All We Imagine as Light
