= Gutland =

Gutland can mean:

- Gotland, the largest island and a province of Sweden
- Gutland (Luxembourg), a region of southern Luxembourg
- Gutland (film), a 2017 film
