= Summer of '62 =

- French: Cartouches gauloises
- Directed by: Mehdi Charef
- Written by: Mehdi Charef
- Produced by: Michele Ray-Gavras
- Starring: Tolga Cayir; Julien Amaté; Hamada; Thomas Millet
- Cinematography: Jérôme Almeras
- Edited by: Yorgos Lamprinos
- Music by: Armand Amar
- Production companies: KG Productions; Pathé Distribution; Battam Films
- Distributed by: Pathé Films
- Release date: May 2007 (Cannes Film Festival)
- Country: France
- Language: French

Summer of '62 (French: Cartouches gauloises) is a 2007 French film, filmed in Algeria and directed by Mehdi Charef. It was screened out of competition at the 2007 Cannes Film Festival.

== Plot ==
The plot concerns the final stages of the Algerian War of Independence in the summer if 1962, as seen through the eyes of Ali, the 11-year-old son of an FLN moudjahid, his mother and his French and Arab friends, as they experience the massive social changes of the end of French rule. The ensemble cast consists mostly of amateur actors.

== Cast ==
- Hamada - Ali
- Zahia Said - Aïcha
- Thomas Millet - Nico
- Tolga Cayir - Gino
- Julien Amate - David
- Nassim Meziane - Paul
- Aurore Labrugère - Julie
- Nadia Samir - Habiba
- Bonnafet Tarbouriech - Barnabé (Station Chief)
- Mohamed Dine Elhannani - Djelloul
- Betty Krestinsky - Rachel
- Assia Brahmi - Zina
- Marc Robert - Lt. Laurent
