= 1½ Knights: In Search of the Ravishing Princess Herzelinde =

2008 film by Til Schweiger

1 1/2 Knights: In Search of the Ravishing Princess Herzelinde
- German theatrical release poster
- Directed by: Til Schweiger
- Written by: Oliver Philipp; Oliver Ziegenbalg
- Produced by: Til Schweiger; Thomas Zickler
- Starring: Til Schweiger; Rick Kavanian; Julia Dietze; Thomas Gottschalk; Udo Kier
- Cinematography: Christoph Wahl
- Edited by: Charles Ladmiral; Olivia Retzer
- Music by: Stefan Hansen; Dirk Reichardt
- Production companies: Warner Bros. Film Productions Germany; Barefoot Films; Lionheart Entertainment; SevenPictures Film
- Distributed by: Warner Bros. Pictures
- Release date: 18 December 2008 (Germany)
- Running time: 115 minutes
- Country: Germany
- Language: German
- Box office: $16 million

1 1/2 Knights: In Search of the Ravishing Princess Herzelinde (German: 1 1/2 Ritter – Auf der Suche nach der hinreißenden Herzelinde) is a 2008 German film directed by Til Schweiger. It stars Til Schweiger, Rick Kavanian, Julia Dietze, Thomas Gottschalk and Udo Kier. The film centers on two knights, Lanze (Schweiger) and Erdal (Kavanian) who are trying to save kidnapped Princess Herzelinde (Dietze) from the Black Knight (Tobias Moretti). Some characters from Der Ring des Nibelungen by Richard Wagner, such as Siegfried (Thierry van Werveke) and Brünnhilde (Stefanie Stappenbeck) appear in the film.

== Plot ==
In the Middle Ages, the dodgy businessman Count Luipold Trumpf approaches the financially troubled King Gunther to court his daughter, Princess Herzelinde. Herzelinde refuses, and so Trumpf has her kidnapped by the Black Knight. So the shy and naive knight Lanze – the princess's bodyguard – and the Turkish petty thug Erdal, the "half" knight, set out to free Princess Herzelinde from the Black Knight's clutches. Aside from their quest constantly being disrupted by the people they meet during their travels, Lanze and Erdal also fall victim to an insidious plot by the royal family. Erdal invents the Döner kebab along the way. Roberto Blanco makes a guest appearance as the beverage supplier for the Black Knight's hippie commune. In the end, with the help of his friend Erdal, the naive knight Lanze becomes sensitive and learns to talk to women, and is allowed to marry his sweetheart Herzelinde.

== Cast ==
- Til Schweiger as Knight Lanze
- Rick Kavanian as Half–Knight Erdal
- Julia Dietze as Princess Herzelinde
- Thomas Gottschalk as King Gunther
- Udo Kier as Luipold Trumpf
- Tobias Moretti as the Black Knight
- Mark Keller as Prince Gustav
- Ralph Herforth as Walter Sattler
- Gregor Bloéb as Jailer
- Thierry van Werveke as Siegfried
- Stefanie Stappenbeck as Brünnhilde
- Tim Wilde as Jailer's Assistant
- Anna Maria Mühe as Maid
- Denis Moschitto as the Archer
- Hannelore Elsner as Witch
- Johannes Heesters as an old scientist
- Dieter Hallervorden as the Horse Seller
- Roberto Blanco as Roberto
- Helmut Markwort as the Chief of the Tabloid

== Development ==
=== Music ===
The 1 1/2 Knights – In Search of the Ravishing Princess Herzelinde soundtrack album was released through Interscope Records on 19 December 2008, and includes the song "Walta Sattla", performed by Til Schweiger. In its review of the album, Bild wrote that "unlike the film itself, the soundtrack is just beautiful, not a funny parade".

== Critical reception ==
The film earned mostly negative reviews from film critics. German newspaper Süddeutsche Zeitung described it as an "embarrassing parade of celebrities", "[...] Til Schweiger has got both the critics and the press to hate him for this film. Not without reason. [...] The film is just as lame as its trailer". TV Movie.de wrote, "If the jokes were better and went beyond adolescent humor, it would become a real comedy". Cinefacts.de added that "Til [Schweiger] once again tried in the comedy genre, but that, unlike his previous films Barfuss and Keinohrhasen, it lacks gags". Dorit Koch from General Anzeiger Bonn wrote "Though the film lacks good gags, the famous cast will attract the audience". Cinema.de described the film as a "shallow medieval farce with a few funny ideas". "Til Schweiger directs and stars in his middle age film with childish jokes and Monty Python style. You can try to find it funny, but you won't", the Die Welt wrote.

== Release ==
Country	Release date	Title	Notes
Germany	18 December 2008	1 1/2 Ritter – Auf der Suche nach der hinreißenden Herzelinde	
Switzerland	18 December 2008	1 1/2 Ritter – Auf der Suche nach der hinreißenden Herzelinde	
Austria	19 December 2009	1 1/2 Ritter – Auf der Suche nach der hinreißenden Herzelinde	
Russia	26 February 2009	Полтора рыцаря: В поисках похищенной принцессы Херцелинды	
Hungary	26 March 2009	1 és 1/2 lovag – Az elbűvölő Herzelinde hercegnő nyomában	Straight-to-DVD

== Other media ==
A video game based on the film was developed by Daedalic Entertainment and published by Warner Bros. Interactive Entertainment.
