= Hot Hot Hot (film) =

- Theatrical release poster
- Directed by: Beryl Koltz
- Written by: Beryl Koltz
- Produced by: Samsa Film; Amour Fou; Artémis Productions
- Starring: Rob Stanley; Joanna Scanlan; Gary Cady; Amber Doyle; Angela Bain; Jane Goddard; Bentley Kalu
- Music by: André Dziezuk
- Release date: 30 September 2011 (Hamburg Film Festival)
- Countries: Luxembourg; Austria; Belgium
- Language: English

Hot Hot Hot is a 2011 Luxembourg-Austrian-Belgian co-production film directed by Beryl Koltz.

== Plot ==
Ferdinand is a shy, introverted man in his forties who has spent his entire career working at Fish Land, a large aquarium within the globalized leisure complex "Worlds Apart." Devoted to his work with fish, he leads a largely solitary life. When Fish Land undergoes a six-month renovation, he is temporarily transferred to another section of the complex, the Finnish-Turkish Delight, a facility centered on saunas and hammams. There, he finds himself confronted with an unfamiliar environment marked by nudity, sensuality, and a culture of relaxation. The film follows his gradual adjustment to this new world and his personal transformation over the course of the experience.

== Cast ==
- Rob Stanley as Ferdinand
- Joanna Scanlan as Mary-Ann
- Amber Doyle as Isadora
- Angela Bain as Eleanor

== Release ==
Hot Hot Hot premiered at the Hamburg Film Festival on 30 September 2011, after which it screened at film festivals such as the Busan International Film Festival and Tirana International Film Festival. It was later given a theatrical release in Luxembourg during March 2012.

== Awards ==
- Best Luxembourg Feature Film at Luxembourg Film Award (2012, won)
- Best Director at Tirana International Film Festival (2012, won - Beryl Koltz)
