= Ambroise Michel =

French actor, director and writer (born 1982)

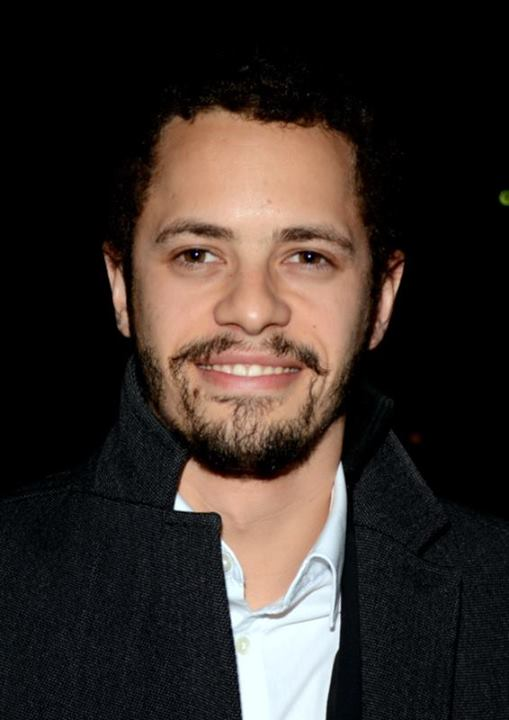
- Ambroise Michel at the ceremony of 19th Lumière Awards.
- Born: 31 March 1982 (age 43); Meaux, Seine-et-Marne, France
- Occupations: Actor, director, writer
- Years active: 1995–present

Ambroise Michel (born 31 March 1982) is a French actor, director and writer.

== Theater ==
Year	Title	Author	Director	Notes
1995	Le Prix du danger	Philippe Brétin	Philippe Brétin	Theatre le Bataclan
1995–98	Quand les Sales Gosses les imitent	Philippe Brétin	Philippe Brétin (2)	Olympia
1996–97	Les Misérables	Victor Hugo	Philippe Brétin (3)	Théâtre de la Gaîté-Montparnasse
1998	L'Affaire de la rue de Lourcine	Eugène Marin Labiche	Alain Paris	Theatre de Coulommiers
2000	Iphigénie	Jean Racine	Jacky Bougault	Theatre de Coulommiers
2001	Jacob Jacobson	Stéphan Boublil	Stéphan Boublil	Theatre de Proposition
2002	The Trojan War Will Not Take Place	Jean Giraudoux	David Sztulman	Théâtre du Gymnase Marie Bell
2003	Prêts pour l'"Action !"	Ambroise Michel	Ambroise Michel	Theatre de Coulommiers
2004	Berenice	Jean Racine	Samy Cohen	Theatre de Ménilmontant
2004	Littoral	David Sztulman	David Sztulman (2)	Théâtre du Gymnase Marie Bell
2004	Bienvenue à bord	Ambroise Michel	Ambroise Michel (2)	Theatre de Coulommiers
2006	Frankenstein	Mary Shelley	Christophe Dagobert	Château de Goulaine
2007	Le Fossé de l'aumône	Olivier Bruhnes	Olivier Bruhnes	Théâtre du Rond-Point
2007–08	Bad Trip	Ambroise Michel	Richard Guedj	Theatre du Lacydon
2008	À la manière d'eux ...	Richard Guedj	Richard Guedj (2)	Théâtre du Gymnase Marie Bell
2009	One parodie show	Benjy Dotti	Ambroise Michel (3)	Théâtre du Rond-Point
2009	A une heure du bonheur	Ichem Saibi	Ambroise Michel (4)	Théâtre du Rond-Point
2012	Bad Trip	Ambroise Michel	Richard Guedj (3)	Festival d'Avignon

== Filmography ==
Year	Title	Role	Director	Notes
1998	Fugue en ré	Julien Moreau	Christian Faure	TV movie
1999	Le G.R.E.C.	Kévin	Emmanuel Fonlladosa	TV series (1 episode)
2000	Suite en ré	Julien Moreau	Christian Faure (2)	TV movie
2004-2022	Plus belle la vie	Rudy Torres	Several	TV series (1 800 episodes)
2005	Adèle et Kamel	The friend	Vincent Monnet	TV movie
2006	Une Mère		Didier Granier-Deferre	TV movie
2006-10	Collection Fighters	Various	Ambroise Michel	Web Series
2009	Vidéo Club	Max	Jean-Yves Fayolle	TV series (1 episode)
2009	Eden Staff		Ambroise Michel (2)	TV series (1 episode)
2010	Tu Me Manques	The man	Jean-Marie Antonini	Music video
2011	Une epine d'amour	Matt Lecul	Ludovic Bornes	
2011	Créations	Amiral Hicks	Nicolas Galgani	TV series (1 episode)
2011	Parasite	Alex	Ambroise Michel (3)	TV series (1 episode)
2011	Cavale	Sam	Ambroise Michel (4)	TV series (1 episode)
2012	Enquêtes réservées	Lionel Musso	Christophe Barbier	TV series (1 episode)
2013	Une vie en Nord	Rudy Torres	Williams Crépin	TV movie
2013–present	Cut !	Adil Vila / Nathan Cazal	Stéphane Meunier, François Bigrat, Vincent Trisolini, ...	TV series (211 episodes)
2014	Nos chers voisins	The former prisoner	Roger Delattre	TV series (1 episode)
2015–2021	Nina	Fred	Éric Le Roux	TV series (17 episodes)
2016	Team Spirit	Tiago	Christophe Barratier	
