= Team Spirit (film) =

2016 French drama film

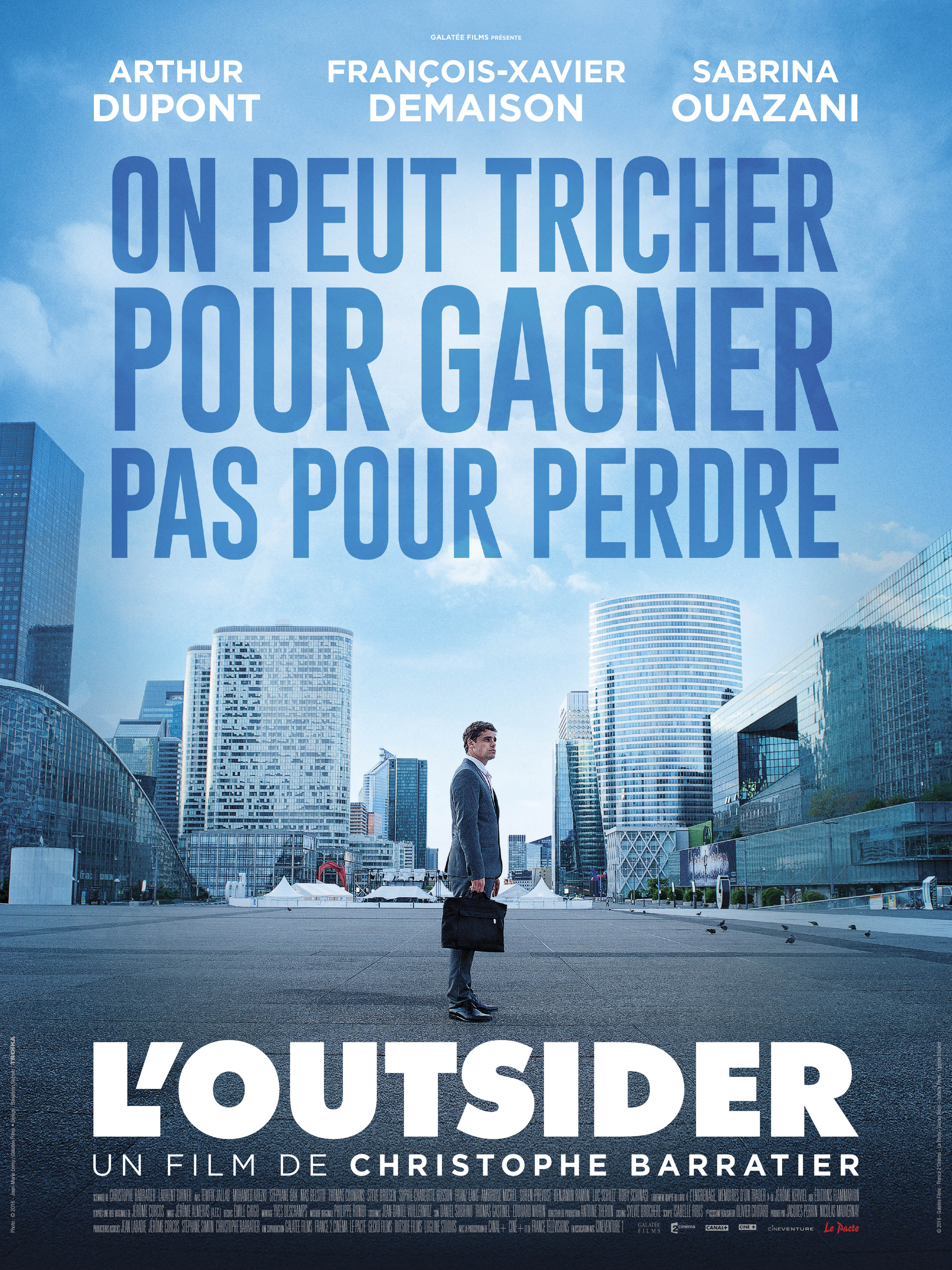
- Theatrical release poster
- Directed by: Christophe Barratier
- Written by: Christophe Barratier; Laurent Turner
- Produced by: Jacques Perrin; Nicolas Mauvernay
- Starring: Arthur Dupont; François-Xavier Demaison; Sabrina Ouazani
- Cinematography: Jérôme Alméras
- Edited by: Yves Deschamps
- Music by: Philippe Rombi
- Production company: Galatée Films
- Distributed by: Le Pacte
- Release date: 22 June 2016
- Running time: 117 minutes
- Country: France
- Language: French
- Budget: $8.8 million
- Box office: $2 million

Team Spirit (French: L'Outsider) is a 2016 French drama film directed by Christophe Barratier.

== Plot ==
Based on the true life story of Jérôme Kerviel, a French trader who was convicted in the 2008 Société Générale trading loss for breach of trust, forgery and unauthorized use of the bank's computers, resulting in losses valued at €4.9 billion.

Kerviel was born in 1977 in a small fishing town in Brittany. He and his brother were brought up simply by their hardworking parents who were devoted to each other. He earned a master's degree in finance.

In 2000, the Société Générale recruits him in the middle office. This "secretariat" has the task of accounting for orders placed by traders to the legendary trading floor. The young Jérôme Kerviel will learn fast, very fast ...

== Cast ==
- Arthur Dupont as Jérôme Kerviel
- François-Xavier Demaison as Fabien Keller
- Sabrina Ouazani as Sofia
- Thomas Coumans as Mathieu Priester
- Tewfik Jallab as Samir
- Ambroise Michel as Tiago
- Mhamed Arezki as Nouredine
- Steve Driesen as Jean-Pierre Kaplan
- Sören Prévost as Benoit Froger
- Franz-Rudolf Lang as Sébastien Mangelle
- Sophie-Charlotte Husson as Valérie Casanova
- Stéphane Bak as Jules
- Luc Schiltz as Colin Blake
- Mas Belsito as Lulu
- Roby Schinasi as Frédéric Bourboulon
- Benjamin Ramon as Ben
- Luc Gentil as Daniel Bouton
- Claudine Pelletier as Jeanne Kerviel
- Michel Masiero as Louis Kerviel
