= My Voice (film) =

Nha Fala
- Directed by: Flora Gomes
- Written by: Flora Gomes; Franck Moisnard
- Produced by: Luís Galvão Teles
- Starring: Ángelo Torres; Fatou N'Diaye; Jean-Christophe Dollé
- Cinematography: Egdar Moura
- Edited by: Dominique Pâris
- Music by: Manu Dibango
- Production companies: Fado Filmes; Les Films du Mai; Samsa Film
- Release dates: 2002 (Venice Film Festival); 25 May 2003 (Portugal); 16 June 2003 (France)
- Running time: 112 minutes
- Countries: Cape Verde; Portugal; France; Luxembourg
- Languages: Cape Verdean Creole; French

Nha Fala, English title: My Voice is a 2002 internationally co-produced musical film directed by Bissau Guinean director Flora Gomes. The movie stars Fatou N'Diaye (sometimes as Ndiaye), Ángelo Torres, Jean-Christophe Dollé and Bia Gomes.

== Plot ==
It has always been a firm conviction of the family that any woman who sings, will die. Now, while a girl is in France she becomes an international star. She realises that sooner rather than later her mother in Africa will learn that she sings. To solve this dilemma she goes back to her native village and arranges her own funeral, albeit with instantaneous rebirth. She is lying in the coffin while all invited guest form a queue and pass the coffin one by one. When she needs go to the toilet a boy will take her place. And then one of the guests says: How different she looks after having died. Is this an allusion to Bergman's movie "Now About These Women"?

== Cast ==
- Fatou N'Diaye - Vita
- Ângelo Torres - Yano
- Jean-Christophe Dollé - Pierre
- Bia Gomes - Vita's mother
- Jorge Biague -Mito
- José Carlos Imbombo -Caminho
- François Hadji-Lazaro - Bjorn
- Danièle Évenou - Pierre's mother
- Bonnafet Tarbouriech - Pierre's father

== Production ==
The film was shot in Mindelo, one of the country's two cultural city and in Paris, the music were written and produced by Manu Dibango. It was produced by Fado Filmes, a Portuguese company, alongside les Films de Mai based in France and Samsa Film based in Luxembourg. Fatou N'Diaye, born in Senegal in 1980 learned the Cape Verdean Creole.

== Reception ==
This musical comedy, which accompanies dancing like and its influences, the cheerful and dramatic narrative with African family traditions, with the emancipation of women and the exclusion of foreigners in Europe. The title Nha Fala (Portuguese: A minha fala, feminine of A minha voz which means "my voice") also stands for the desire to express his innermost heart, unadulterated and free.

The movie was seen in several movie festivals including the 2002 Venice Film Festival where it was awarded, the African Film Festival of Ouagadougou in Burkina Faso, the Amiens Film Festival in the north of France., the 3 Continents Festival in Nantes, France, the 2002 Carthage Film Festival in Tunisia and the 2003 28th Annual Göteborg (Gothenburg) Film Festival in Sweden. In Brazil, they were seen at the 31st Bahía International Film Festival held in 2004 and the 2007 Itu Film Festival. In 2008, it was seen at the 2008 Göteborg (Gothenburg) Film Festival.

== Release ==
The film was released on 25 May 2003 in Portugal, later it was released in France on 16 June 2003, Guinea-Bissau on 6 March 2004 and later in Cape Verde.

My Voice was later released on DVD in 2013.

== See also ==
- Cinema of Cape Verde
- List of Portuguese films of the 2000s
- List of French films of 2002
- List of Luxembourgian films
