= Offside (2005 film) =

2005 German film by Buket Alakuş

- Directed by: Buket Alakuş
- Starring: Karoline Herfurth; Thierry Van Werveke
- Cinematography: Bella Halben
- Release date: 19 January 2005
- Running time: 1h 40min
- Country: Germany
- Language: German

Offside (German: Eine andere Liga) is a 2005 German drama film directed by Buket Alakuş.

== Plot ==
Hayat, a 20-year-old girl of Turkish-German descent is diagnosed with breast cancer and loses a breast. Against the will of her father Baba Can she rejoins her football team. The team's trainer Toni falls in love with Hayat.

== Cast ==
- Karoline Herfurth - Hayat
- Thierry Van Werveke - Baba Can
- Ken Duken - Toni
