= Adolf El Assal =

- Born: 1981-04-07; Alexandria, Egypt
- Occupations: Film director, producer
- Notable work: Les Fameux Gars (2014), Sawah (2019)

Adolf El Assal, is a filmmaker, producer, and writer of Egyptian-Luxembourgish background. His work often incorporates multicultural elements and blends humor with social themes. El Assal has produced or co-produced films that have been distributed internationally. His projects include feature films, television, and shortform productions, with a focus on collaborations between European and Middle Eastern partners.

== Early life and education ==
Adolf El Assal was born on 7 April 1981 in Alexandria, Egypt. He has Syrian and Slovenian roots. Shortly after his birth, his family relocated to the United Arab Emirates, where his parents worked as a pharmacist and a doctor. Around the age of six or seven, his family settled in Luxembourg following a stopover during a European summer holiday trip from the UAE. This experience later served as the basis for his semi-autobiographical film Sawah. He was raised in the towns of Remich and Rodange and attended evening courses at Lycée Michel-Lucius.

Before beginning his career in film, El Assal worked as a DJ in several clubs in Luxembourg prior to reaching the legal age for entry and operated an underground record label. During his childhood, he used his father's VHS camcorder to recreate scenes from American sitcoms, involving his siblings as actors.

In 2002, El Assal began undergraduate studies at Kingston University in London, where he earned a Bachelor of Arts degree in Media and Cultural Studies in 2005. He continued at Kingston University to complete a Master of Arts in Filmmaking, graduating in 2007. During his studies, he co-founded Bigtime Entertainments, a low-budget production company that produced around 30 projects, mainly music videos for various artists including Robbie Williams and Craig David. In 2005, he served as a jury member at the Cartoons on the Bay Film Festival in Positano, Italy. The following year, he participated in the Berlinale Talentcampus and was a Youth Jury Member at the Festival de Cannes. El Assal is fluent in English, French, German, Luxembourgish, and Egyptian Arabic.

== Career ==
After completing his postgraduate studies, El Assal worked as a freelance producer and editor for various international media organizations, including the BBC, MBC, Al Jazeera, Current TV, and LUXE.TV. He also held a position as a teaching assistant at Kingston University. El Assal's first notable film credit was as a producer on Divizionz (2006/2008), a guerrilla feature filmed in a Ugandan slum and co-produced with Donald Mugisha and James Tayler.

In 2011, El Assal co-founded the independent production company Wady Films (formerly Wady Media) in Luxembourg. The company focused on producing and co-producing international feature films, documentaries, and television content with an emphasis on crosscultural narratives. Under this company, El Assal produced films including Les (Fameux) Gars (2014) and Sawah (2019). In 2010, El Assal directed two short films that contributed to the development of his directorial style. La Fameuse Route... (The Notorious Road..., 12 minutes) was screened at over 20 international festivals and received five awards. Mano de Dios (God's Hand, 15 minutes) was shown at the Doha Tribeca Film Festival and was selected for multiple other festivals, receiving several awards. Both films drew on El Assal's experiences as an individual of immigrant background living in Luxembourg.

In 2007, El Assal directed his first feature-length film, Reste Bien, Mec!, a low-budget production completed in two weeks following his collaboration with Luxembourgish rappers. The film premiered in the largest cinema in Luxembourg and was screened nationally for six weeks.

El Assal completed his first formally produced feature, Les Fameux Gars (2012), a €750,000 comedy filmed in 20 days in Luxembourg. Released in France and Belgium in 2013, it featured rapper Orelsan in his first film role. After distributor offers fell short, the film was independently distributed in France via digital platforms. It received multiple nominations at the Lëtzebuerger Filmpräis, including Best Feature Film.

=== Sawah and Netflix (2019–2020) ===
El Assal spent seven years developing his second feature, Sawah, completed in 2019. The film, a Luxembourg production with international co-producers, was co-written by El Assal, Dennis Foon, and Sirvan Marogy. Sawah was released on Netflix on 14 May 2020 in 46 countries and is the first Luxembourgish live-action feature by a local director on the platform. It screened at over 100 festivals, won about 34 awards, and was distributed in over 50 countries. The film is part of a planned semi-autobiographical trilogy about the director's experience as an Egyptian raised in Luxembourg.

=== Television: Baraki (2021) ===
After Sawah, El Assal directed several episodes of the Belgian comedy-drama series Baraki, produced by 1080 Films and created by Julien Vargas, Peter Ninane, and Fred de Loof. The first season aired on Belgian public television RTBF and was streamed on Netflix France and Benelux. The series, which follows the working-class Berthet family, was renewed for a second season following positive reception. It was the first comedy supported by the relevant production fund to have a 26-minute format.

=== Dubai Expo 2020 and Full Memory (2022) ===
In 2017, El Assal was chosen by the Luxembourg government to represent cinema in a multidisciplinary project for the Luxembourg Pavilion at Expo 2020 Dubai. He co-wrote and directed the 13-minute Arabic-language short film Full Memory in one day, featuring SyrianDanish actor Mazen Haj Kassem. The film, about a young Syrian refugee in Luxembourg confronting past trauma, screened at the pavilion in January 2022 and was shown at around 70 international film festivals, including the Arab Film Festival Rotterdam.

=== Producing slate (2019–2025) ===
Through Wady Films, El Assal has participated in international co-productions across various genres and regions. Notable projects include My Grandpa Is an Alien (2019), Croatia’s first sci-fi children’s film; Absolutely Must Go (2021), a documentary on the Chagossian displacement; Sharaf (2021), an Arabic-language drama awarded at the JCC Carthage Film Festival; Pamfir (2022), a Ukrainian feature recognized at Cannes and the European Film Awards; Beanie (2022), Slovenia’s first Christmas film; M (2023), a North Macedonian drama distributed in the US; Kanaval (2023), a Canada–Luxembourg co-production honored at the Toronto International Film Festival; Tuk Tuk Eye (2024), an Arabic documentary on the Iraqi October Revolution; and La Zone (2024), a Tunisian-German-Luxembourg-French thriller with Benelux distribution by Wady Media.

=== Hooped and current projects ===
El Assal's third feature as director, Hooped, is a coming-of-age comedy-drama co-written with Canadian screenwriter Dennis Foon. The story follows a 17-year-old aspiring entrepreneur and basketball player traveling from Luxembourg to Canada and Egypt. The project was presented at Berlinale Talents 2023, marking El Assal's second participation in the program. The screenplay received a writing grant from Film Fund Luxembourg. Cast members include Kida Khodr Ramadan and Tua El Fawwal.

== Filmography ==
As producer or co-producer
Year	Title / Director	Role
2019	My Grandpa Is an Alien / Marina Andree Škop, Dražen Žarković	Co-producer (Wady Films)
2021	Absolutely Must Go / S. JeanNoël Pierre	Producer (Wady Films)
2021	Sharaf / Samir Nasr	Co-producer (Wady Films)
2022	Beanie (Kapa) / Slobodan Maksimović	Co-producer (Wady Films)
2022	Full Memory / Adolf El Assal	Producer (Wady Films)
2022	Pamfir / Dmytro SukholytkyySobchuk	Co-producer (Wady Films)
2022	Agua / Daniel Perlman	Executive Producer (Wady Films)
2023	M (Beyond the Wasteland) / Vardan Tozija	Co-producer (Wady Films)
2023	Kanaval / Henri Pardo	Co-producer (Wady Films)
2023	Entre les mots / Farid Ismaïl	Executive producer (Wady Films)
2023	Arman & Elisa / Kiyan Agadjani	Producer (Wady Films)
2023	Fair / Kim Schneider	Producer (Wady Films)
2024	Tuk Tuk Eye / Dhyaa Joda	Co-producer (Wady Films)
2024	La Zone / Lassaad Dkhili	Co-producer (Wady Films)
2025	Child (Le Refuge) / Cyrus Neshvad	Executive Producer (Wady Films)
2025	Der Kuss des Gräshüpfers (The Kiss of the Grasshopper) / Elmar Imanov	Co-producer (Wady Films)
2025	Les Baronnes (The Baronesses) / Nabil Ben Yadir, Mokhtaria Badaoui	Associate Producer (Wady Films)

As Director
Year	Title	Format	Notes
2007	Reste Bien, Mec!	Feature film (no budget)	Guerrilla production. Shot in two weeks; premiered in Luxembourg's largest cinema; screened nationally for six weeks
2008	Divizionz	Feature film (producer/codirector)	Berlin International Film Festival 2008. 100+ festival selections. 30+ territories sold
2011	La Fameuse Route... (The Notorious Road...)	Short film, 12 min	20+ festival selections; 5 awards.
2011	Mano de Dios (God's Hand)	Short film, 15 min	Doha Tribeca Film Festival. 2 awards.
2012/2 013	Les Fameux Gars (The Notorious Guys)	Feature film,	85 min Written, directed, produced. Released France/Belgium 11 Dec 2013. Budget €570,000. Shot in 20 days. Cast includes Orelsan (first cinema role).
2015	Ouni Mooss	Short film	Luxembourg production. [IMDb]
2019	Sawah	Feature film, 85 min	Luxembourg/Belgium/Egypt. Netflix 46 countries (May 2020). First Luxembourgish live-action feature on Netflix. 100+ festivals, 34 awards. Script: El Assal, Dennis Foon, Sirvan Marogy. Stars Karim Kassem.
2021	Baraki (Season 1)	TV series, 5 episodes	Belgian/RTBF production by 1080 Films. Netflix France and Benelux. Renewed Season 2
2022	Full Memory	Short film, 13 min,	Arabic Co-written and shot in one day with Mazen Haj Kassem. Luxembourg Pavilion, Expo 2020 Dubai (Jan 2022). 70+ festival screenings.
