= Renart the Fox =

2005 film

- Directed by: Thierry Schiel
- Written by: Thierry Schiel
- Starring: Frédéric Diefenthal
- Release date: 12 August 2005
- Running time: 90 minutes
- Country: Luxembourg
- Language: French

Renart the Fox (French: Le Roman de Renart) is a 2005 Luxembourgish animated film directed by Thierry Schiel. It was selected as the Luxembourgish entry for the Best Foreign Language Film at the 78th Academy Awards, but it was not nominated.

== Cast ==
- Frédéric Diefenthal as Renart
- Lorànt Deutsch as Rufus
- Marc Bretonnière as Ysengrin
- Denise Metmer as Hersent
- Henri Poirier as King Nobel

== See also ==
- Reynard the Fox
- List of submissions to the 78th Academy Awards for Best Foreign Language Film
- List of Luxembourgish submissions for the Academy Award for Best International Feature Film
