= The Treasure Knights and the Secret of Melusina =

- Directed by: Laura Schroeder
- Written by: Stefan Schaller; Martin Dolejs; Oliver Kahl; Eileen Byrne; Christoph Englert; Elodie Malanda
- Produced by: Bernard Michaux
- Starring: Anton Glas; Thierry Koob; Lana Welter; Tun Schon; Alexandra Neldel; Clemens Schick
- Cinematography: Peter von Haller
- Edited by: Uta Schmidt
- Music by: Natalia Dittrich
- Release date: April 6, 2012
- Running time: 93 minutes
- Countries: Germany; Luxembourg
- Languages: German; Luxembourgish

The Treasure Knights and the Secret of Melusina (Luxembourgish: D'Schatzritter an d'Geheimnis vum Melusina) is a 2012 German-Luxembourgish children's film. Directed by Laura Schroeder. The film follows an Enid Blyton-like story plot.

== Content ==
Jeff and his friends are searching for the treasure of Melusina and falling into adventure.

== Cast ==
- Anton Glas - Jeff Kutter
- Thierry Koob - Leo
- Lana Welter - Julia
- Tun Schon - Killer
- Alexandra Neldel - Melanie
- Clemens Schick - Duc de Barry
- Elisabeth Brück - Killers Mutter

== Background ==
The film was made by Lucil Film, NEOS Film, Bavaria Film Partners, Screenvest and Perathon Medien. Its premiere was on 4 July 2012 in Luxembourg and the German premiere in Munich on 30 August 2012. It was filmed in Luxembourg (Notre-Dame Cathedral) and Germany (Saarland and Munich).
