= The Last Ashes =

2023 Luxembourgish film

- Theatrical release poster
- Luxembourgish: Läif a Séil
- Literally: Body and Soul
- Directed by: Loïc Tanson
- Written by: Loïc Tanson; Frédéric Zeimet
- Produced by: Claude Waringo
- Starring: Sophie Mousel; Timo Wagner; Jules Werner; Luc Schiltz; Philippe Thelen
- Cinematography: Nikos Welter
- Edited by: Loïc Tanson
- Music by: When 'Airy Met Fairy
- Production companies: Samsa Film; Artémis Productions
- Release dates: 9 October 2023 (Sitges); 25 October 2023 (Luxembourg)
- Running time: 120 minutes
- Country: Luxembourg
- Languages: Luxembourgish; Ojibwé
- Budget: €3,947,432

The Last Ashes (Luxembourgish: Läif a Séil) is a 2023 Luxembourgish Western drama film directed by Loïc Tanson in his directorial debut. Starring Sophie Mousel, it follows Hélène, who returns to her native village under a new identity. Looking for revenge and ready to do anything to destroy the Graff family. The film was premiered at the 56th Sitges Film Festival on 9 October 2023 and subsequently released in Luxembourg on 25 October.

It was selected as the Luxembourgish entry for the Best International Feature Film at the 96th Academy Awards On 7 December it appeared in the eligible list for consideration for the 2024 Oscars, but, it didn't make it to the shortlist.

== Synopsis ==
This is a contemporary western drama with female leads, taking place in Luxembourg in 1854.

Hélène comes back to her home village taking new identity to take revenge from the Graff family. Graff family is ruling over her community with an iron fist. She is furious to see how her relatives and neighbors are oppressed by the cruel and powerful lords. She plans a revenge against the elitist and authoritarian family to destroy them, alone.

== Cast ==
- Sophie Mousel as Hélène - Oona
- Timo Wagner as Jon
- Jules Werner as Graff
- Luc Schiltz as Pier
- Philippe Thelen as Luc
- Konstantin Rommelfangen as Hélène's father
- Larisa Faber as Hélène's mother
- Henner Momann as Dutch soldier
- Tommy Schlesser as Henri
- Marie Jung as Marie
- Jean-Paul Maes as Pastor Meyers
- Denis Jousselin as Kremer
- Jeanne Werner as Sindonie
- Max Gindorff as Tom
- Colette Kieffer as Woman from the village
- Marc Baum as Man from the village
- Jules Waringo as Man from the village
- Pierre Bodry as Man from the village
- Frank Grotz as Appersmann

== Production ==
In 2019, Film Fund Luxembourg contributed €30,000 for project development. In 2020, Film Fund Luxembourg contributed €30,000 taking the contribution to €2.8 million of the total budget, which was estimated at €3,947,432.

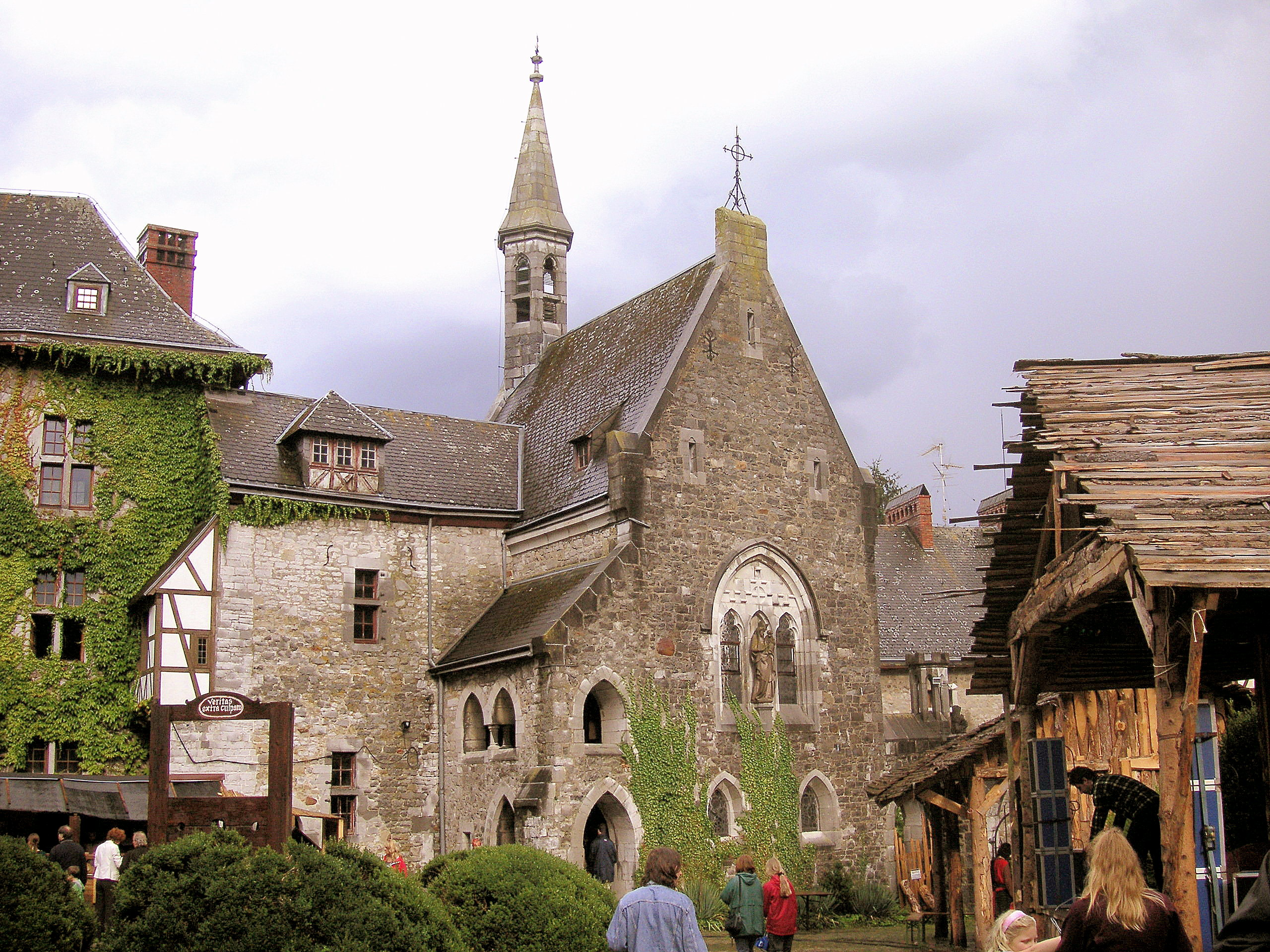
Eyneburg castle in Hergenrath, Belgium; the filming site of The Last Ashes

Filming began on 25 April 2022 and completed on 25 June mainly near the Eyneburg castle in Hergenrath in the municipality of Kelmis, Belgium. On 7 June 2022, behind the scenes of filming were revealed.

== Release ==
The Last Ashes was selected in Noves Visions section of the 56th Sitges Film Festival and screened on 9 October 2023 in Sitges, Catalonia, Spain.

The film was screened at the FrightFest London Festival on 25 August 2024.

== Reception ==
Duncan Roberts writing in Luxembourg Times praised Loïc Tanson and Frédéric Zeimet for researching the "old Luxembourgish to create dialogue with accents and vocabulary that may have been used in the 1880s". Roberts also praised production designer Christina Schaffer "for creating a suitably grim ambience"; and costume designer Magdalena Labuz for meticulous costumes; and duo of When Airy Met Fairy (Thorunn Egilsdottir and Mike Koster) for the "haunting music". Roberts was critical of editing of Tanson. Concluding he wrote, "The Last Ashes is a well-executed epic of the kind all too rarely made in Luxembourg." He added, "It is a gripping and gritty story - there are scenes of violence that will cause more sensitive viewers to reel in horror - that delves into a period of Luxembourg history also seldom explored."

The film was also selected as the Luxembourg entry for nominations to the 38th edition of the Goya Award for Best European Film (10 February 2024, Valladolid, Spain), competing with nine other selections from 9 European countries.

== See also ==
- List of submissions to the 96th Academy Awards for Best International Feature Film
- List of Luxembourgish submissions for the Academy Award for Best International Feature Film
