= Deepfrozen =

Deepfrozen is a 2006 film written and directed by Luxembourgish director Andy Bausch and starring Peter Lohmeyer and Lale Yavaş. Filmed in Luxembourg, the film was premiered at Luxembourg on 7 September 2006, and was featured at the Oldenburg International Film Festival in Germany on 14 September 2007.

== Cast ==
- Peter Lohmeyer as Ronnie
- Lale Yavas as Zoya
- Thierry van Werveke as Lars
- Marco Lorenzini as Speck
- Ingrid Caven as Vicki
