= Breathing Underwater (film) =

2024 Luxembourgish film

- Theatrical release poster
- Luxembourgish: Hors d'haleine
- Literally: Out of breath
- Directed by: Eric Lamhène
- Written by: Rae Lyn Lee; Eric Lamhène
- Produced by: Claude Waringo; Patrick Quinet
- Starring: Carla Juri; Véro Tshanda Beya Mputu; Esperanza Martin González-Quevedo
- Cinematography: Rae Lyn Lee
- Edited by: Jean-Luc Simon
- Production companies: Samsa Film; Artémis Productions
- Distributed by: Samsa Distributions
- Release dates: 12 October 2024 (Warsaw Film Festival); 13 November 2024 (Luxembourg)
- Running time: 102 minutes
- Countries: Luxembourg; Belgium
- Languages: Luxembourgish; French; Spanish; Italian

Breathing Underwater (Luxembourgish: Hors d'haleine) is a 2024 Luxembourgish drama film co-written and directed by Eric Lamhène. The film is an emotional, character-driven drama set in the secretive world of a women's shelter. The film had its world premiere at the Warsaw Film Festival on 12 October 2024. It competed in the 1-2 Competition section.

It was selected as the Luxembourgish entry for the Best International Feature Film at the 98th Academy Awards, but it was not nominated.

== Cast ==
- Carla Juri as Emma
- Véro Tshanda Beya Mputu as Khadij
- Esperanza Martin González-Quevedo as Esperanza
- Alessia Raschella as Sascha
- Sascha Ley as Tania
- Luc Schiltz as Marc

== Production ==
In December 2020, Film Fund Luxembourg allotted €30,000 for the development of the film.

In October 2023 the film was selected at the sixth edition of European Work in Progress Cologne.

== Release ==
Breathing Underwater had its world premiere at the Warsaw Film Festival in Competition 1-2 section on 12 October 2024. It also competed at the Lecce European Film Festival in November 2024 and won Special Jury award.

It was released in Luxembourg on 13 November 2024 by Samsa Distributions.

In February 2025 it competed in COOP! competition of the Ostend Film Festival for Best Co-production.

== Reception ==
Vittoria Scarpa of Cineuropa reviewing the film at the Lecce European Film Festival, praised it describing the film as "touching, true to life and captivating." Scarpa highlighted the screenplay co-written by the director Eric Lamhène and cinematographer Lee Rae Lyn: as a mosaic of real stories shared by women over time. She commended Carla Juri's performance as Emma, noting how the actress "expertly conveys Emma's varying states of mind: pain, confusion, seeming apathy, and then the return of her smile, of hope and of courage." Scarpa emphasized the film's nuanced portrayal of domestic abuse, particularly its non-physical forms such as emotional manipulation, financial control, and humiliation. She wrote that the shelter setting, full of "chaos, children playing, climbing plants on the stairs, colours," becomes a space of resilience and rebirth for Emma and her fellow residents. The characters of Khadij, Esperanza, and Sascha were also praised for their depth and contribution to the film’s theme of female solidarity.

== Accolades ==
Award	Date of ceremony	Category	Recipient	Result	Ref.
Warsaw Film Festival	19 October 2024	Competition 1-2	Breathing Underwater	Nominated	
Lecce European Film Festival	16 November 2024	Special Jury Prize	Breathing Underwater	Won	
Lecce European Film Festival	16 November 2024	Cineuropa Award	Breathing Underwater	Won	
Luxembourg Film Award	22 November 2025	Best Luxembourgish Feature Film	Breathing Underwater	Won	

== See also ==
- List of submissions to the 98th Academy Awards for Best International Feature Film
- List of Luxembourgish submissions for the Academy Award for Best International Feature Film
