= Laura Schroeder =

Luxembourgish film director

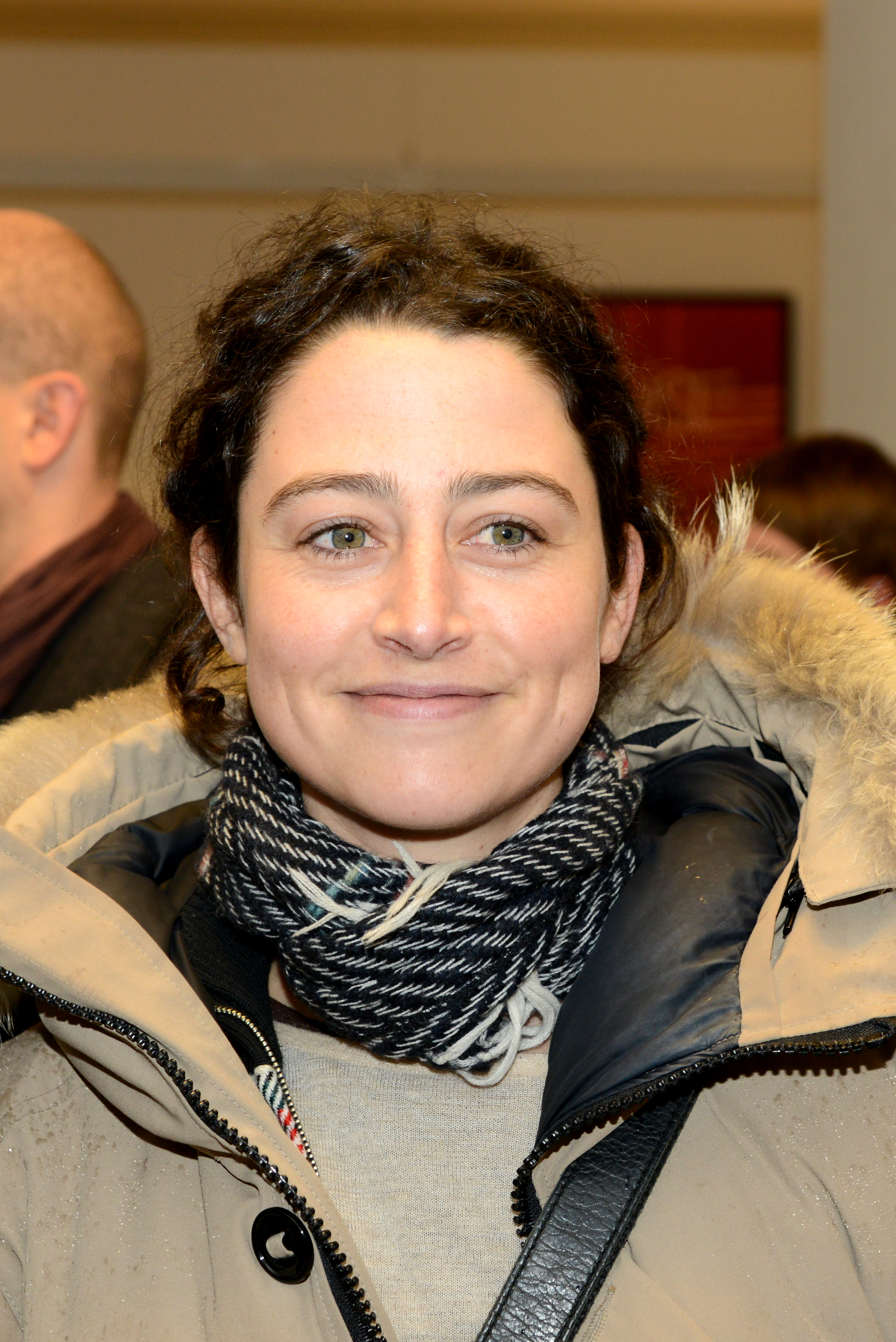
- Laura Schroeder in 2014
- Born: Laura Schroeder; 7 June 1980 (age 46); Luxembourg City, Luxembourg
- Occupations: Director; writer
- Years active: 2003–present
- Website: www.lauraschroeder.net

Laura Schroeder (born 7 June 1980) is a Luxembourgish writer and film director. She is best known for her 2017 drama film Barrage which was Luxembourg's entry for the Best Foreign Language Film at the 90th Academy Awards.

== Biography ==
Schroedar was born in Luxembourg City, Luxembourg on 7 June 1980. She earned an master's degree in film science at the University of Paris - Sorbonne, and later obtained a postgraduate diploma in directing from the National Film and Television School in London. She wrote and directed two short films; Senteurs in 2008 and Double Saut in 2010. Her other notable films include The Treasure Knights and the Secret of Melusina (2012) and Comeback (2012). In 2017, she premiered her first feature film Barrage at the Berlin International Film Festival. The film later became Luxembourg's entry for the Oscar's Best Foreign Language Film category. She received funding worth €30,000 from the Luxembourg Film Fund for her second feature film Maret in 2019.

She named Chantal Akerman's Jeanne Dielman, 23, quai du Commerce, 1080 Bruxelles as her favourite woman-directed film.
