= Bonnafet Tarbouriech =

French actor (born 1952)

- Born: 21 April 1952 (age 74); Nîmes, France
- Occupation: Actor
- Years active: 1980–present

Bonnafet Tarbouriech (born 21 April 1952) is a French actor. He appeared in more than sixty films since 1980.

== Filmography ==
Year	Title	Role	Notes
1980	T'inquiète pas, ça se soigne	L'externe Thierry	
1981	Quartet	Prison Guard	Uncredited
1982	L'indiscrétion	Client boulangerie	Uncredited
1983	Zig Zag Story	Un détenu	
1984	L'arbalète		
1986	Max mon amour	Le vétérinaire	
1988	Bonjour l'angoisse		
1994	Daisy et Mona		
1995	Les Milles	L'adjudant Bordier	
1996	Sélect Hôtel	Cast Member	
1996	Fallait pas!...		
1997	Le pari	Bernard's co-worker	
1997	On connaît la chanson	Doctor #2	
1998	Les Boys II	Le gendarme	
2000	L'extraterrestre	Le garde-pêche	
2001	Absolument fabuleux	Chauffeur taxi Patsy	
2001	J'ai faim !!!	L'agent de police	
2002	Le nouveau Jean-Claude	Le client costaud	
2002	Nha Fala	Pierre's father	
2003	Taxi 3	Pharmacien	
2003	7 ans de mariage	Bonhomme méridional	
2003	Ripoux 3	Le boucher	
2005	Boudu	Perez	
2006	Mon colonel	Le gendarme au service des archives	
2007	Cartouches Gauloises	Barnabé, le chef de gare	
2009	Eden Is West	Le serveur de la brasserie	
2009	Dans tes bras	Le patron de l'hôtel / The boss of the hotel	
2012	Capital	Maître Tombière	
2013	Vive la France	Délégué syndical marseillais	
2013	Fanny	Le chauffeur du car	
2014	Les Trois Frères, le retour	Gendarme	
2015	Graziella		
2016	Our Kind of Traitor	Danny	
2017	Vénéneuses	Bud Alvarez	
2017	Votez pour moi!	Veyron	
2017	Les sept remparts de la citadelle		
