= Rendolepsis =

- Directed by: Marc Barnig; Philippe Schockweiler
- Starring: Vivi Giampaolo; Joëlle Kugener
- Release date: 2003
- Running time: 90 min.
- Country: Luxembourg
- Language: Luxembourgish

Rendolepsis is a film made in Luxembourg in 2003, directed by Marc Barnig and Philippe Schockweiler and produced by Koler Movies Lëtzebuerg (KML). It stars Vivi Giampaolo and Joëlle Kugener as two friends who embark on an adventure to learn more about a mysterious book which one of them finds in her attic.

The film premiered on 19 September or 20 September 2003, at the Kinosch cinema in Esch-sur-Alzette. The dialogue is in Luxembourgish, the national language of Luxembourg..

== See also ==
- Cinema of Luxembourg
