= River Tales =

2020 film

- Film poster
- Directed by: Julie Schroell
- Written by: Julie Schroell
- Cinematography: Frank Pineda
- Edited by: Damian Plandolit
- Release date: 5 March 2020
- Running time: 82 minutes
- Country: Luxembourg
- Language: Spanish

River Tales (Spanish: Cuentos del río) is a 2020 Luxembourgish documentary film directed by Julie Schroell. It was selected as the Luxembourgish entry for the Best International Feature Film at the 93rd Academy Awards, but it was not nominated.

== Synopsis ==
Along the San Juan River in Nicaragua, a teacher and his students put on a play that explores local identity and the river's colonial and environmental history.

== See also ==
- List of submissions to the 93rd Academy Awards for Best International Feature Film
- List of Luxembourgish submissions for the Academy Award for Best International Feature Film
