= Kropemann =

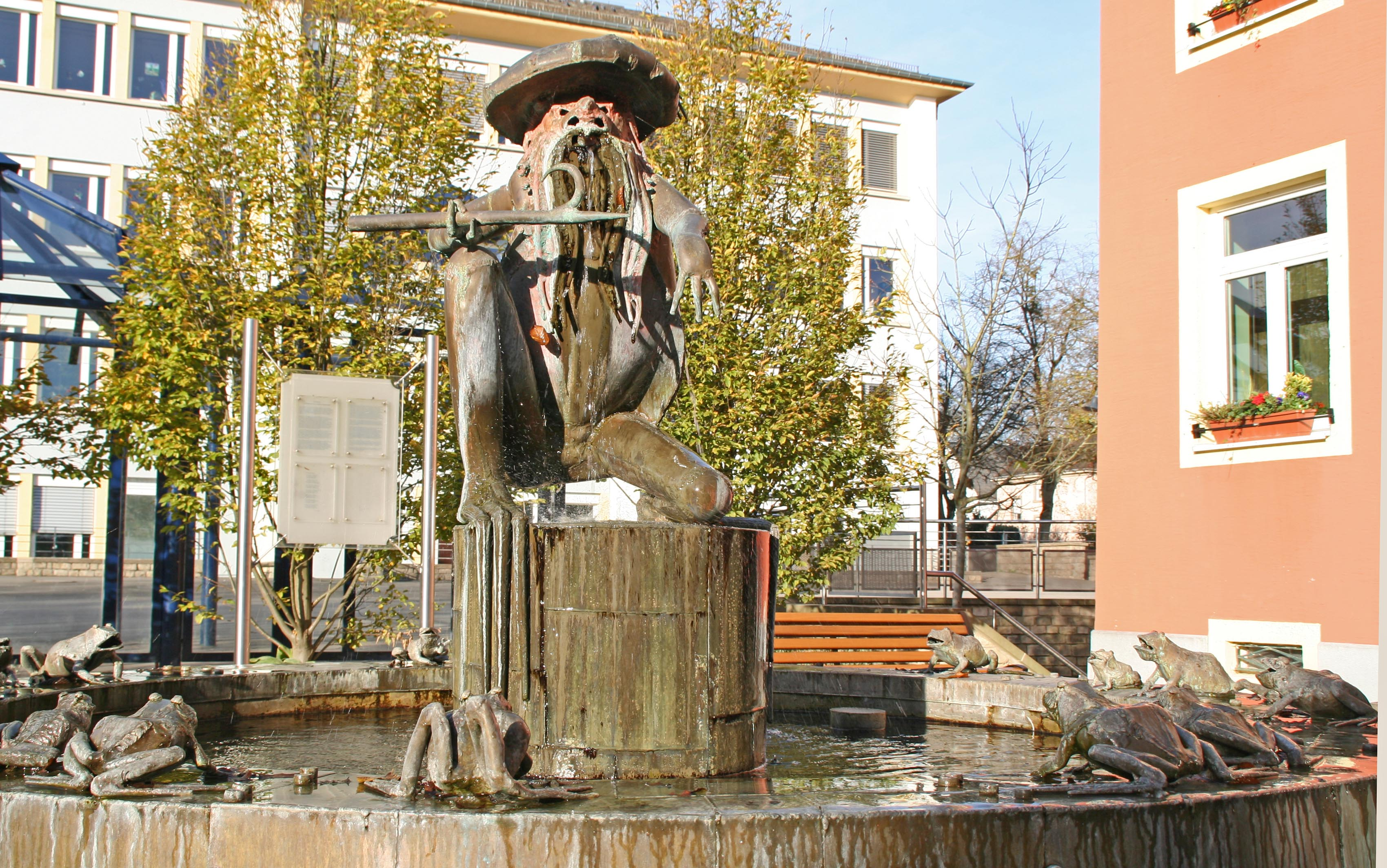
Statue of the Kropemann in Redange

The Kropemann (literal meaning "Hookman" in Luxembourgish) is a mythical figure of luxembourgish folklore. The water demon is commonly associated with the town of Redange in the northwest of the country.

== Appearance ==
The Kropemann is described as a sinister figure, living in the depths of the river Attert, in western Luxembourg. He is often depicted as a small man with a long ragged beard, his body being covered in shredded clothes, as well as water plants and algae. His most notable feature is the so-called Kropestaang (meaning "hook rod") which he uses to drag his victims into the river.

== Legend ==
According to the legend the Kropemann lurks in the river Attert to wait for victims that get too close to the river bank. Once he catches them, he drags them into the depths of the river where they are eaten, or held captive and have to work for him.

This story is told to Luxembourgish children in order to prevent them from getting too close to the water in places where there is a risk of drowning, such as streams, ponds, wells, etc.

== Poem ==
The poet Willi Goergen (1867–1942) dedicated a poem titled "De Kropemann" to the water demon. The luxembourgish version has been adapted to the modern orthography.

Luxembourgish version	English translation
Am Pëtz do sëtzt de Kropemann Wat mécht hien an deem Waasser dran? E lauert mat der Kropestaang Bis datt en d'Këndche - jupps - gefaang. Wat wëll e mat deem Këndche maan? E späert et a säi Keller an, do ass et däischter, kal an naass. D'léift Këndche géing rëm gär op d'Gaass, Mee 't kann och jäize, jéimere, klo'n: 't däerf net méi bei seng Mamma go'n. Duerfir meng hierzeg Zockergrëtz, bleif schéin ewech vum déiwe Pëtz. A kuck dach nëmmen net méi dran, Soss kënnt den uerge Kropemann. E kroopt dech an d'Zéif - Komm huerteg, meng Spréif!	The Kropemann sits in the well What's he doing in the water? He's lurking with the hook rod Until he has caught the child. What's he going to do with it? He's going to lock it in his cave, where it's dark, cold and wet. The dear child would like to go back to the streets, But all crying, whining, complaining is in vain: it can not go back to its mother. Therefore, my dear child, stay away from the deep well. Or else the terrible Kropemann will come. He will hook your toe - Come quickly, my starling!

== Trivia ==
Since 2012, an annual festival dedicated to the Kropemann is held in Redange.
