= Capitani (TV series) =

Luxembourgish television series

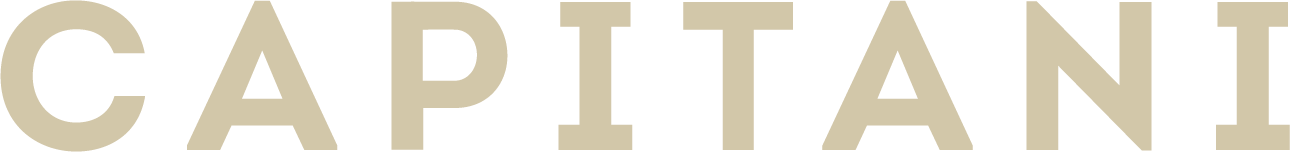
- Genre: Crime; Mystery; Drama
- Written by: Thierry Faber; Eric Lamhène; Christophe Wagner
- Directed by: Christophe Wagner
- Starring: Luc Schiltz; Sophie Mousel
- Composer: David Sinclair
- Country of origin: Luxembourg
- Original languages: Luxembourgish; French; German; English
- No. of seasons: 2
- No. of episodes: 24

Production
- Producer: Claude Waringo
- Cinematography: Jako Raybaut
- Editors: Thierry Faber; Jean-Luc Simon
- Running time: 24–32 minutes
- Production companies: Samsa Film; Artémis Productions
- Budget: €2.6 million

Original release
- Network: RTL Télé Lëtzebuerg
- Release: 1 October 2019 – present
- Network: Netflix
- Release: 11 February 2021 – present

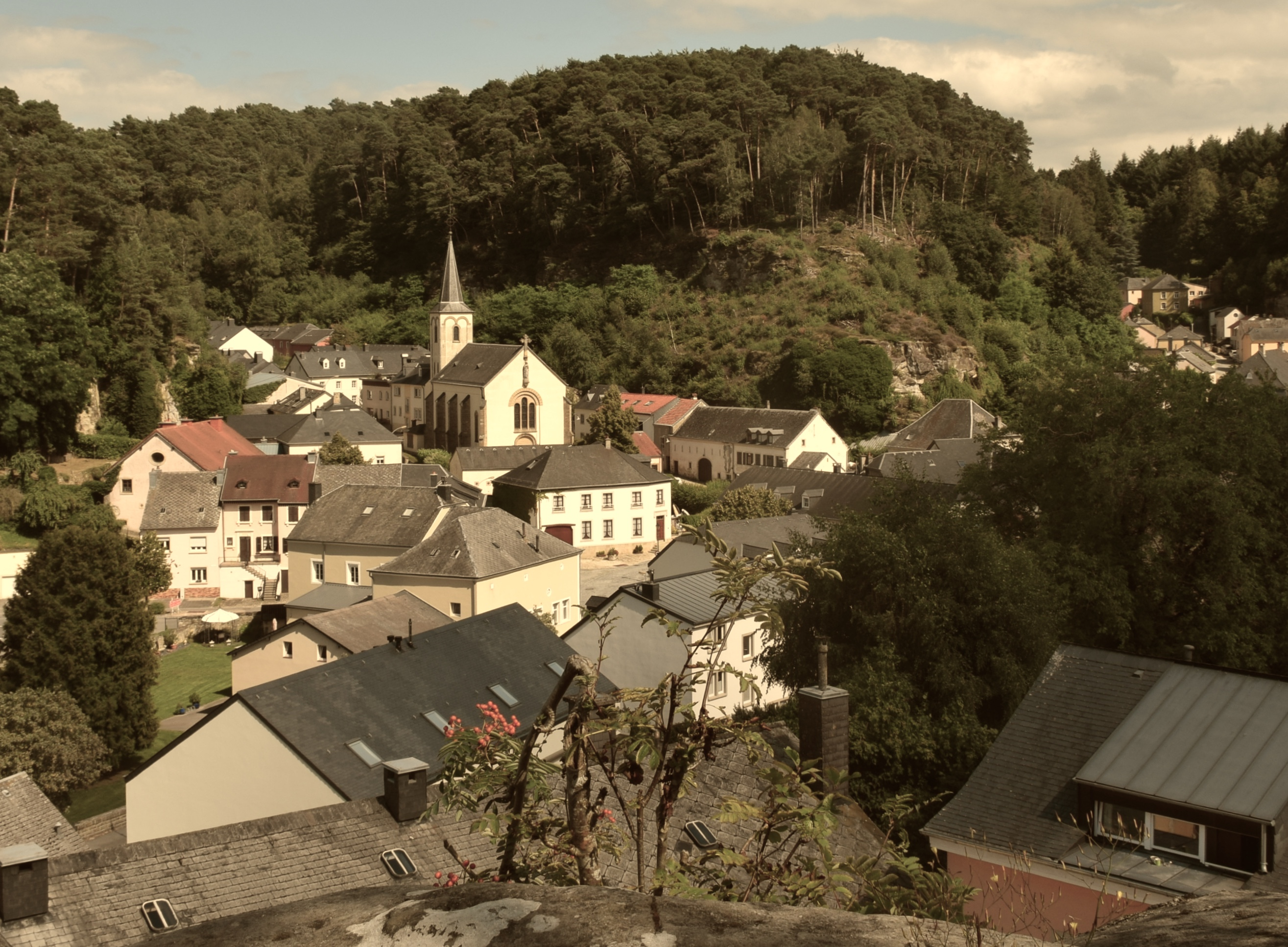
View of "Manscheid" (Bourglinster)

Capitani is a Luxembourgish crime drama series created by Thierry Faber, Eric Lamhène, and Christophe Wagner that premiered on 1 October 2019 on RTL Télé Lëtzebuerg. Capitani is the first Luxembourgish crime series as well as the country's first Netflix series.

The first season was produced by Samsa Film, in collaboration with RTL and Artémis Productions, with support from Film Fund Luxembourg. Season 2 added Shelter Productions to its roster.

The show was acquired by Netflix and began streaming on 11 February 2021. It was renewed for a second season, again directed by Wagner. Season 2 premiered on RTL on 22 February 2022 and began streaming on Netflix on 8 July 2022.

== Synopsis ==
Season 1

The body of fifteen-year-old Jenny Engel is found in a forest near the fictional village of Manscheid (Mënscht), in the north of Luxembourg. Inspector Luc Capitani is called in from the south of the country to investigate the murder. He is assisted by young local police officer Elsa Ley. Capitani has difficulty dealing with the villagers' mentality. During their investigation, the two penetrate further into a complicated web of intrigue in which nothing is as it seems, and it becomes clear that the villagers know more than they admit. In the course of the investigation, Inspector Capitani must not only track down a murderer, but also understand the mindset of each individual resident and break open a system in which many people are manipulated for the "common good". The story unfolds over the span of eight days.

Season 2

Four years after the events of Season 1, Capitani, who had been fired from the police force and convicted as an accessory to the murder of a drug dealer, has been released from prison due to inadequate evidence and is now living in a run-down area of Luxembourg City. He is hired by a sex worker to find a friend who has disappeared. Subsequently, he goes undercover for the prosecutor to investigate, and break up, the drug trade in the city.

== Cast and characters ==
Principal and recurring

- Luc Schiltz as Luc Capitani
- Sophie Mousel as Elsa Ley
- Brigitte Urhausen as Carla Pereira / Sofia Santos
- Konstantin Rommelfangen as Steve Weis
- Jil Devresse as Jenny / Tanja Engel
- Joe Dennenwald as Joe Mores

Season 1

- Claude De Demo as Nadine Kinsch
- Jules Werner as Mick Engel
- Raoul Schlechter as Rob Berens
- Pierre Bodry as Pastor Claude Glodt
- Luc Feit as Usch Trierweiler
- Jemp Schuster as Pierre Rommes
- Julie Kieffer as Manon Boever
- Esther Gaspart Michels as Lea Holmes
- Marc Limpach as Gérard Gaspard
- Max Gindorff as Jerry Kowalska
- Timo Wagner as Frank Ferrone
- Désirée Nosbusch as Diane Bonifas
- Roland Gelhausen as Jim Boever

Season 2

- Edita Malovčić as Valentina Draga
- Edson Anibal as Lucky Onu
- Tommy Schlesser as Arthur Koenig
- André Jung as Gibbes Koenig
- Lydia Indjova as Bianca Petrova
- Adrien Papritz as Dominik Draga
- Céline Camara as Stella Abasi
- Philippe Thelen as Toni Scholtes

== Episodes ==
The title of each episode of the first season is a line from poems and songs by Luxembourgish poet Michel Lentz, best known for composing the country's national anthem.

=== Season 1 ===
| No. overall | No. in season | Title | Directed by | Written by | Original release date |
|---|---|---|---|---|---|
| 1 | 1 | "Oh You, Up There" | Christophe Wagner | Unknown | 1 October 2019 |
Day 1: The body of Jenny Engel, a 15-year-old girl, is found in a forest close to the village of Manscheid. Inspector Luc Capitani is sent in from out of town to take over the investigation. Local police officer Elsa Ley assists him. They find out that Jenny's twin sister, Tanja, is missing. The girls' mother, Nadine, is severely distraught and has to be hospitalized. Capitani interrogates her husband, Rob (Jenny's stepfather), and later her father, Mick. Rob is seen hanging from a rope in his house at the end of the episode.
| 2 | 2 | "Below Is a Dark, Wooden Crown" | Christophe Wagner | Unknown | 8 October 2019 |
Day 2: Capitani goes for a jog in the morning, then is greeted by the owner of the inn where he is staying; this turns out to be Carla, a former lover who disappeared from his life fifteen years ago. Capitani and Ley return to the hospital to speak with Nadine, then go to Jenny's school to interrogate one of her friends and the principal. Capitani holds a press conference regarding the investigation. The town's mayor gathers a search party to comb the forest where Jenny's body was found. One of them finds a pair of glasses that matches those worn by Rob, who is the prime suspect in Jenny's death. It later turns out that they were planted there to place the blame on Rob.
| 3 | 3 | "Out of Childhood, Out of Childhood" | Christophe Wagner | Unknown | 15 October 2019 |
Day 3: Capitani and Ley go to interview Mady Berens, Rob's mother, who expresses her distaste for Nadine and Jenny. Ley returns to the school with officer Joe Mores to try and obtain camera footage from the principal. This latter is at first unwilling to cooperate, and the officers threaten him with a search warrant. Ley meets her boyfriend Steve at the obstetrician and has an ultrasound that reveals she is pregnant. Capitani, searching for clues in the woods, spots her kissing Steve. The village gathers at a church mass for Jenny. While the pastor is speaking and the choir sings, the door opens and Tanja walks in, to everyone's shock.
| 4 | 4 | "No Rest for the Eyes, No Rest for the Heart" | Christophe Wagner | Unknown | 22 October 2019 |
Day 4: Mores gets accosted by several gossiping villagers and reveals details about the investigation. Capitani and Ley go to the Engel home to speak with Tanja, but get no satisfactory answers from her. Capitani has a tense meeting with the town's mayor, Pierre Rommes, and threats are made in both directions. The mayor attends a municipal meeting to discuss the merging of three communities, including Manscheid. His deputy, Mick Engel, accuses him of fabricating evidence against Rob Berens and forces him to resign. Capitani and Mores go to the army base in order to meet with the officer in charge.
| 5 | 5 | "Strangers Will Be Obliged to Accept" | Christophe Wagner | Unknown | 29 October 2019 |
Day 4: Capitani and Mores are denied entry to the army camp, and the detective promises to return with a warrant. After getting back to town, Mores searches Rob Berens' car and finds a bag of pills. Capitani meets with Carla at the inn over wine, and he tells her how he tracked her down. Following this, Capitani and Ley go back to the school and confront the principal with the pills that were found in Rob's car. He admits that the school has a major drug problem. Capitani interrogates Lea Holmes, a friend and classmate of Jenny's, about what they were doing the last time she saw the dead girl. She makes up a false alibi, but eventually comes clean. Ley receives the coroner's report on Jenny's autopsy and begins an investigation into sex offenders. Capitani meets with Carla again at the inn, and after speaking about their past, they proceed to have sex.
| 6 | 6 | "So Far From Me, So Far!" | Christophe Wagner | Unknown | 5 November 2019 |
Day 5: On her way to work, Ley spots the bakery van. Inside, she finds Manon, the baker's daughter, asleep on the floor. Ley leaves some money and takes a few pastries. With Capitani, she goes to the army base to speak with Jerry Kowalska, who has a previous conviction for a sex offense. The town's new mayor, Mick Engel, visits with Mores and tries to get information from him about the police investigation. Mores is pressured to give him a lead. Capitani and Ley interrogate Gérard Gaspard, who claims he was playing cards with the baker and pastor on the night of Jenny's death. Capitani decides to explore a previously unknown path, marked by a unicorn, a symbol that matches an image on the bag of pills they found in Rob's car. Ley investigates Gaspard's alibi and finds out he lied to them. Capitani, munching on a muffin Ley got from Manon, starts to feel dizzy and passes out in the forest.
| 7 | 7 | "And I Know Misfortune and Sorrow" | Christophe Wagner | Unknown | 12 November 2019 |
Day 5: Capitani wakes up in the forest and realizes the muffin he ate had drugs in it. He reaches the end of the unicorn trail, where he finds a log cabin. At home, Nadine finds Mick's phone, and reads the coroner's report sent to him by Mores. She hints to Mick that he needs to find their daughter's killer. Ley picks up Capitani and they rush to Gaspard's residence. There they find Mick beating him up. Ley and Capitani return to the office, where Mores tells them Diane Bonifas, the detective's former boss, is waiting to see him. In the meantime, Ley goes back to the army base. She sneaks in and Steve catches her exiting his tent. They have a tense conversation and she notices that he is missing a button from one of his sleeve cuffs, the same kind that she found in the forest on Day 1. Bonifas records her conversation with Capitani, and they discuss an old case of a murdered drug dealer. She reveals that he was killed using a police weapon.
| 8 | 8 | "These Wonderful Golden Dreams" | Christophe Wagner | Unknown | 19 November 2019 |
Day 6: Capitani, on his way back to town from his morning jog, accosts the baker to ask him about drugs in his muffins. Manon is seen having sex with Mick in his office, following which he rudely dismisses her. At the camp, Frank tries to call off an upcoming drug delivery. Too late, however, as it is already on its way. Steve plans a way for the three soldiers to head off the truck during the squadron's maneuvers, when their absence will go unnoticed. Capitani stages a dramatic arrest of Jim Boever, Manon's father, in her presence, in order to pressure her to talk. She takes off and heads for the woods. Capitani gets a call from Bonifas, letting him know that Carla is under suspicion. Ley tracks the bakery van to the woods, and finds Manon passed out, having overdosed on drugs and alcohol.
| 9 | 9 | "My Heart Was Full of Trust" | Christophe Wagner | Unknown | 26 November 2019 |
Day 6: Diane Bonifas returns to Manscheid and confronts Capitani about his past relationship with Carla. Through an inquiry with Interpol, she discovers Carla's presence in the village. Capitani goes to speak with Nadine and Tanja. He gradually connects several clues, including a tattoo that Jenny had, and realizes that Tanja is in fact the twin who died; Jenny has been impersonating her sister. Ley, having figured out that the soldiers are behind the drug operation, notifies Capitani, who takes her off the case due to her personal connection to Steve. He then goes to the army base with a warrant and asks to search one of the trucks, where he finds concealed drugs. Bonifas shows up at the inn and requests a room from Carla.
| 10 | 10 | "I Knew Nothing of Tears and Pain" | Christophe Wagner | Unknown | 3 December 2019 |
Day 7: Bonifas visits Capitani at the office and gives him an ultimatum. The three soldiers, holed up at the cabin in the woods, are beginning to lose their cool. Steve goes to seek Mick's help. Ley comes to pick up her things from the office and Capitani updates her on the case. At Mick's office, Steve lays the blame on Jerry and Frank for the way their deal has unravelled. Mick, alarmed at being implicated, takes his shotgun and the two head back to the cabin. Jenny shows up at the school and offers her help to the police. She tells Ley that the soldiers are at the cabin, and the cop heads there straight away. Bonifas confronts Carla and tells her to incriminate Luc for the drug dealer's murder or she will plant drugs on her. She returns a little while later with backup, only to find Carla gone. The innkeeper is seen disappearing into the woods. Frank sneaks up on Ley as she approaches the cabin and points a gun at her.
| 11 | 11 | "My Breast Full of Darkest Night" | Christophe Wagner | Unknown | 10 December 2019 |
Day 7: Ley manages to wrestle the gun from Frank. Jerry arrives with an assault rifle and points it at her. Jenny, with whom he'd been secretly having a relationship, steps out into the clearing and tells him who she is. Freaked out, he shoots Frank and Ley, and drags Jenny into the cabin. Capitani arrives and tries to staunch Ley's bleeding. Unable to leave her side, he watches as Mick goes into the cabin, shots ring out, and he comes out with Jenny. Paramedics arrive and carry Ley to an ambulance. Both Jerry and Frank are dead; Steve is arrested. At the school, Bonifas tells Capitani that if he doesn't go with her story against Carla, he must turn himself in the next morning. Mick is publicly arrested for the death of Jerry.
| 12 | 12 | "It Happened One Beautiful Summer's Day" | Christophe Wagner | Unknown | 17 December 2019 |
Day 8: While checking out of the inn, Capitani tells the desk clerk that Carla has disappeared. He goes to the hospital to talk to Manon, and she confesses that she has been seeing Mick and that he is involved in the town's illicit drug trade. The detective then goes to see Ley and is told by the nurse that she will pull through. Steve is there too and as Ley wakes up, she reveals that she knows about his involvement in the drug deals. Through flashbacks and later a conversation with Capitani, Jenny reveals what happened on the night Tanja died. She was the one who accidentally pushed her sister off the cliff and then decided to switch identities with her. Bonifas arrives at the Engel house and Capitani is placed under arrest. He decides to ignore the girl's confession and tells Mores that with Ley, the three of them had solved the case.

=== Season 2 ===
| No. overall | No. in season | Title | Directed by | Written by | Original release date |
|---|---|---|---|---|---|
| 13 | 1 | "In Your Sights" | Christophe Wagner | Unknown | 22 February 2022 |
| 14 | 2 | "There's Someone on the Corner" | Christophe Wagner | Unknown | 22 February 2022 |
| 15 | 3 | "Hit or Run" | Christophe Wagner | Unknown | 1 March 2022 |
| 16 | 4 | "Until the First Approaches You" | Christophe Wagner | Unknown | 1 March 2022 |
| 17 | 5 | "Your Last Thought" | Christophe Wagner | Unknown | 8 March 2022 |
| 18 | 6 | "If Only I Fled" | Christophe Wagner | Unknown | 8 March 2022 |
| 19 | 7 | "No Time to Lose" | Christophe Wagner | Unknown | 15 March 2022 |
| 20 | 8 | "The First One to Fall" | Christophe Wagner | Unknown | 15 March 2022 |
| 21 | 9 | "Late at Night" | Christophe Wagner | Unknown | 22 March 2022 |
| 22 | 10 | "You Are Alone" | Christophe Wagner | Unknown | 22 March 2022 |
| 23 | 11 | "Wipe the Smile from Your Face" | Christophe Wagner | Unknown | 29 March 2022 |
| 24 | 12 | "You Should Know What's Best" | Christophe Wagner | Unknown | 29 March 2022 |

== Production ==
The budget for the first season was 2.6 million Euros. Of this, €2.1 million came from the Film Fund Luxembourg, which had already supported the development of the script with €50,000 in 2017. RTL contributed €300,000, with the rest coming from Samsa Film and Artémis Productions.

In June–July 2020, Film Fund Luxembourg supported the script development of the second season with €120,000. In November 2020, FFL contributed another €1,300,000 towards filming. The total cost for the second season amounted to approximately €4 million.

The first season was set in the fictional village of Manscheid. Most of the filming took place in Junglinster, with locations including the town of Gonderange and Bourglinster. Additional filming was done in Wiltz, Kopstal, and Lintgen.

Season 2 was filmed from March to June 2021.

== Reception ==
The first season of the series broke all records in its respective category on RTL Télé Lëtzebuerg. Polling firm TNS Ilres determined that an average of 147,500 viewers watched each episode upon its initial release, corresponding to 29% of the population of Luxembourg aged sixteen and over. A survey by InternetPanel.lu showed that 90.4% of viewers were interested in seeing a second season.

In a review, Forbes wrote, "... Capitani proves to be a very well-paced series with complex storylines, slowly letting all the lies and secrets surrounding the small village unravel."
