= Paul J. Scheuer =

Chemist

Paul Josef Scheuer (born 25 May 1915 in Heilbronn; died 12 January 2003 in Hawaii) was a German/American chemist.

== Biography ==
Born in 1915 in Heilbronn, Scheuer completed his school education in 1934 at the Realgymnasium Heilbronn. As a Jew, he was unable to take up studies in Germany because of the racial laws[3]. He began training in a leather tannery. Arranged by his supervisor, he switched to a tannery in Pécs in southern Hungary, which specialised in fine leather, in December 1935 and later worked in Simontornya. There the technical manager, a doctor of chemistry, taught him the chemical background of leather production. He was "fascinated with chemistry as an intellectual challenge" and decided to become a chemist. In 1937, he visited Germany for the funeral of his mother one time before last. Until autumn 1938 he spent time in tanneries in Yugoslavia and England.

As the threat of war in Europe increased, he emigrated to the United States in 1938, working first as a packer of leather and later as a foreman in a tannery in Ayer, Massachusetts. In autumn 1939 he enrolled as an evening student at Northeastern University in Boston. A year later he moved to Boston and studied full-time at the College of Liberal Arts, where he received a B.S. in 1943. He then moved to Harvard University and chose Robert B. Woodward as his supervisor. He worked on addition reactions to bind ketene to alpha-vinylpyridine.

For two years and four months he was contracted for the Chemical Warfare Service, which is responsible for chemical weapons in the U.S. Army. In January 1945, he was transferred to Fort Ritchie, Maryland, and trained in military intelligence. A few days before the end of the war, he flew to Paris and travelled on to Bavaria. With the exception of the Nuremberg Trials, he describes his fourteen months as a special agent in Germany as "uneventful".

He resumed his studies in September 1946, financed by the G. I. Bill. Among his instructors were Gilbert Stork and Morris Kupchan. Scheuer received his Ph.D. in organic chemistry in 1950. In July 1950 he was appointed assistant professor at the University of Hawaii, and decided to set off for a "nebulous future" on the island with his fiancée Alice Dash. They married at Harvard on September 5 and travelled from San Francisco to Hawaii on the passenger ship SS Lurline. He remained at the University of Hawaii until his retirement in 1985.

Paul Scheuer had four children. He died in Hawaii at the age of 87 of leukemia.

== Career ==
At the University of Hawaii, Scheuer came into contact with researchers from botany, marine biology, and agricultural science. He recognised that Hawaii, with its largely unexplored endemic flora, offered good opportunities for research into biodiversity and natural products. For example, he did research on the kava plant with Rudolf Hänsel from the Free University of Berlin, but soon turned his attention to the chemical ecology of marine ecosystems. For 20 years, his institute conducted research on ciguatoxins, the structure of which his former post-doctoral researcher Takeshi Yasumoto was able to unlock in 1989. Later, Scheuer participated in the "war on cancer" proclaimed by U.S. President Richard Nixon and developed drugs based on substances he had extracted from Elysia rufescens, a sea slug.

He contributed to nearly 300 scientific articles and reviews. The field of molecular and chemical biotechnology, which he co-founded, has developed into an important branch of organic chemistry.

== Awards and honours ==
His former students initiated the Paul J. Scheuer award in Marine Natural Products in 1992. He was the first recipient.

In 1994, he received the Ernest Guenther Award of the American Chemical Society and the Norman R. Farnsworth Research Achievement Award of the American Society of Pharmacognosy.

Since 2004, the Akademie gemeinnütziger Wissenschaften zu Erfurt awards the Scheuer-Preis for marine biotechnology and materials research.

== Books ==
- Paul J. Scheuer: Chemistry of Marine Natural Products. Academic Press, New York 1973, doi:10.1016/B978-0-12-624050-4.X5001-9.
- Paul J. Scheuer (ed.): Marine Natural Products: Chemical and Biological Perspectives. 5 volumes, Academic Press 1978–1983.
  - Volume I, 1978, ISBN 978-0-12-624001-6, doi:10.1016/B978-0-12-624001-6.X5001-2.
  - Volume II, 1978, ISBN 978-0-12-624002-3, doi:10.1016/B978-0-12-624002-3.X5001-3.
  - Volume III, 1980, ISBN 978-0-12-624003-0, doi:10.1016/B978-0-12-624003-0.X5001-4.
  - Volume IV, 1981, ISBN 978-0-12-624004-7, doi:10.1016/C2013-0-11462-6.
  - Volume V, 1983, ISBN 978-0-12-624005-4, doi:10.1016/C2013-0-11463-8.
- Paul J. Scheuer (ed.): Bioorganic Marine Chemistry. Six volumes, ISSN 0935-7092, Springer, Berlin/Heidelberg 1987–1992.
- Paul J. Scheuer (ed.): Marine Natural Products — Diversity and Biosynthesis (Topics in Current Chemistry 167), Springer, Berlin/Heidelberg 1993, ISBN 978-3-540-56513-0, doi:10.1007/BFb0034368.

== Literature ==
- István Hargittai: Paul J. Scheuer. In: Candid Science: Conversations with Famous Chemists, 2000, p. 93–113, ISBN 1-86094-151-6, doi:10.1142/9781860943836_0008.
- P. Zurer: Paul Scheuer’s life, work celebrated. In: Chemical & Engineering News 79(4), p. 70, 22 January 2001, doi:10.1021/cen-v079n004.p070.
- Festschrift Issue of Tetrahedron in Honor of Paul Josef Scheuer, Professor Emeritus of Chemistry, The University of Hawaii at Manoa. In: Tetrahedron 56, 2000, p. vii–ix, doi:10.1016/S0040-4020(00)00853-X.
