= Fernand Fox =

Luxembourgish actor (1934–2024)

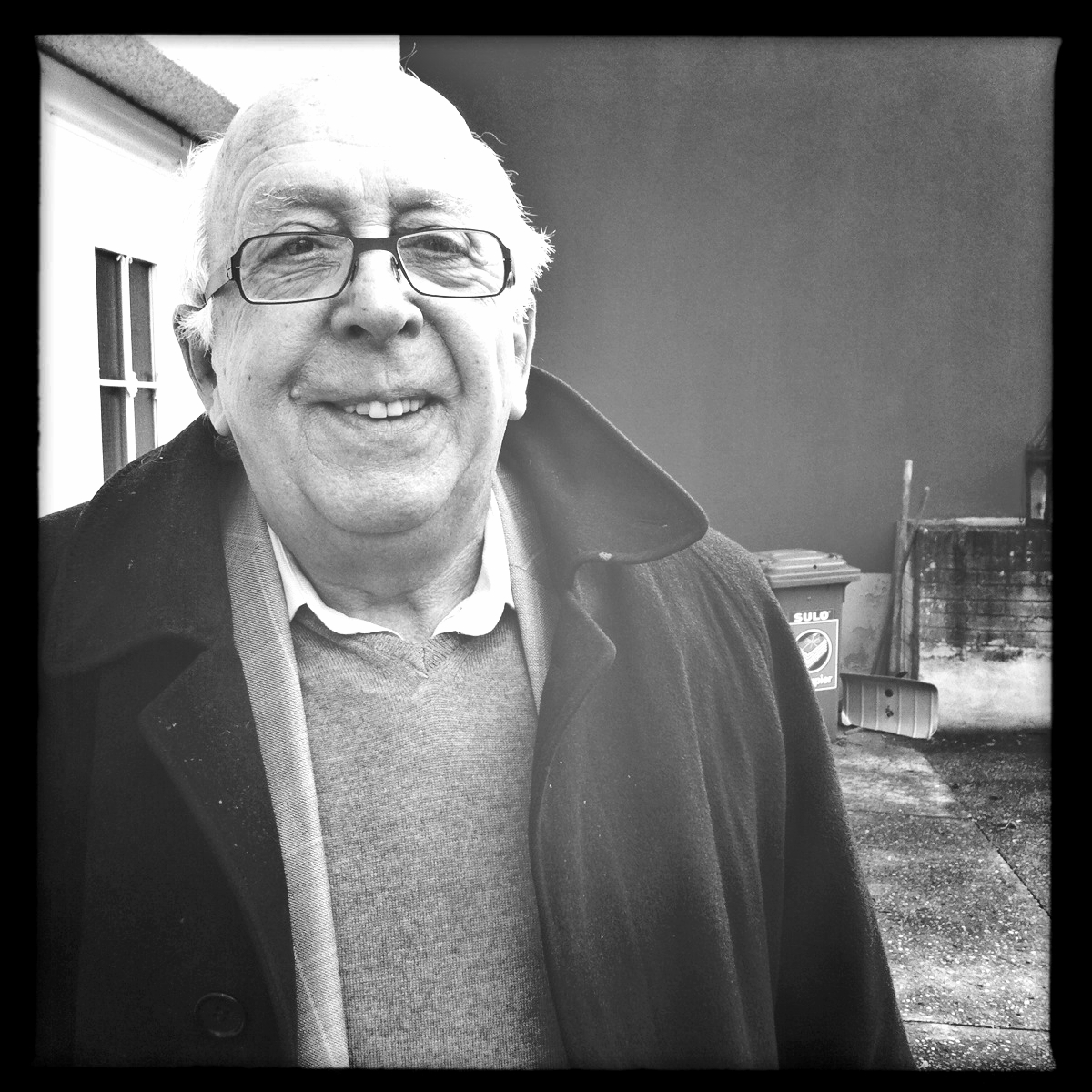
- Fox in 2011
- Born: 26 January 1934; Bollendorf-Pont, Luxembourg
- Died: 23 September 2024 (aged 90)
- Occupation: Actor

Fernand Fox (26 January 1934 – 23 September 2024) was a Luxembourgish theatre and film actor. He was the subject of the 2014 documentary Succès Fo(u)x, directed by Désirée Nosbusch and co-written with actor Marc Limpach. Fox died on 23 September 2024, at the age of 90.
