= Barrage (film) =

2017 film

- Film poster
- Directed by: Laura Schroeder
- Written by: Laura Schroeder; Marie Nimier
- Starring: Isabelle Huppert; Lolita Chammah
- Release dates: 10 February 2017 (Berlin); 19 July 2017 (Luxembourg)
- Running time: 112 minutes
- Country: Luxembourg
- Language: French

Barrage is a 2017 Luxembourgish drama film directed by Laura Schroeder and starring Isabelle Huppert and her real-life daughter Lolita Chammah. It was selected as the Luxembourgish entry for the Best Foreign Language Film at the 90th Academy Awards, but it was not nominated.

== Plot ==
Over the course of a turbulent weekend, three generations of women reunite and move apart.

== Cast ==
- Lolita Chammah as Catherine
- Themis Pauwels as Alba
- Isabelle Huppert as Elisabeth

== Reception ==
On review aggregator website Rotten Tomatoes, the film holds an approval rating of 50% based on 10 reviews, and an average rating of 5.1/10. On Metacritic, the film has a weighted average score of 54 out of 100, based on 7 critics, indicating "mixed or average reviews".

== See also ==
- Isabelle Huppert on screen and stage
- List of submissions to the 90th Academy Awards for Best Foreign Language Film
- List of Luxembourgish submissions for the Academy Award for Best Foreign Language Film
