= Sophie Tarbouriech =

French control theorist (born 1964)

Sophie Tarbouriech (born 1964) is a French control theorist whose research interests include linear and nonlinear control with limited information, anti-windup mechanisms, and the control of hybrid dynamical systems, with applications including aircraft landing control and surgical anesthesia. She is a director of research for the French National Centre for Scientific Research (CNRS), affiliated with the Laboratory for Analysis and Architecture of Systems in Toulouse, and the editor-in-chief of Journal Europeen des Systemes Automatises, and Automatica.

== Early life and education ==
Tarbouriech was born in 1964 in Carcassonne. She was a student at Toulouse III - Paul Sabatier University, where she earned a Diplôme d'Etudes Approfondies (the equivalent of a master's degree) in 1988. She completed her doctorate there in 1991, directed by Christian Burgat. She earned a habilitation there in 1998.

== Recognition ==
Tarbouriech was named an IEEE Fellow, in the 2024 class of fellows, "for contributions to nonlinear control systems with isolated nonlinear elements".
