= Never Die Young (film) =

2013 film

- Film poster
- Directed by: Pol Cruchten
- Produced by: Pol Cruchten
- Release date: 30 March 2013
- Running time: 66 minutes
- Country: Luxembourg
- Language: French

Never Die Young is a 2013 Luxembourgish drama film directed by Pol Cruchten. It was selected as Luxembourg's entry for the Best Foreign Language Film at the 87th Academy Awards.

== See also ==
- List of submissions to the 87th Academy Awards for Best Foreign Language Film
- List of Luxembourgish submissions for the Academy Award for Best Foreign Language Film
