= Govinda Van Maele =

Luxembourgish film director

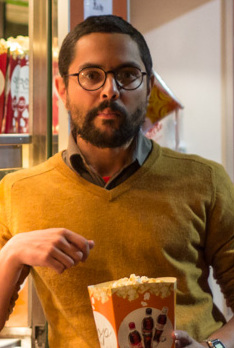
Govinda in 2013

Govinda Van Maele (born 1983) is a Luxembourgish film director of Sri Lankan‑Belgian origin.

Director and screenwriter of the drama film Gutland, it was selected as the Luxembourgish entry for the Best Foreign Language Film at the 91st Academy Awards.

Govinda Van Maele is the brother of Narayan Van Maele, who was a cinematographer at Gutland.
