= Women (1997 film) =

1997 drama film directed by Luís Galvão Teles

- Directed by: Luís Galvão Teles
- Written by: Luís Galvão Teles; Don Bohlinger
- Produced by: Jani Thiltges; Claude Waringo
- Starring: Miou-Miou
- Cinematography: Alfredo F. Mayo
- Edited by: Regina Bärtschi; Jacques Witta
- Music by: Alejandro Massó
- Release date: 17 October 1997
- Running time: 115 minutes
- Countries: Luxembourg; Belgium; France
- Language: French

Women (French: Elles) is a 1997 internationally co-produced drama film directed by Portuguese filmmaker Luís Galvão Teles, shot in Lisbon. The film blends international influences, creating a tone described by critics as reminiscent of French comedy infused with Iberian drama. The film was selected as the Luxembourgish entry for the Best Foreign Language Film at the 70th Academy Awards, but was not accepted as a nominee.

== Plot summary ==
The film follows five middle-aged women in Lisbon — longtime friends who support one another through life's inevitable changes and losses. Linda (Carmen Maura), a television journalist with a fiery temperament, interviews her friends about their three greatest wishes while carrying on a complicated affair with young director Gigi (Joaquim de Almeida). Eva (Miou-Miou), a widowed professor, becomes involved in a passionate affair with a young student who happens to be the son of her friend Barbara (Marthe Keller), a hypochondriac who maintains an ambiguous relationship with her ex-husband Edgar. Chloé (Marisa Berenson) attempts to balance a life between her troubled past and a secret she keeps hidden, while actress Branca (Guesch Patti) enjoys her turbulent life while navigating a conflicted relationship with her daughter.

== Reception ==
The film received a mixed critical reception. Reviewing the film for the Los Angeles Times, critic Kevin Thomas described it as "a woman's film of the old-fashioned variety, affording good roles for five internationally renowned actresses." The New York Times noted the film benefits from the "commanding presence" of Carmen Maura, a regular in Pedro Almodóvar's films.

== Cast ==
- Miou-Miou as Eva
- Carmen Maura as Linda
- Marthe Keller as Barbara
- Marisa Berenson as Chloé
- Guesch Patti as Branca
- Joaquim de Almeida as Gigi
- Didier Flamand as Edgar

== See also ==
- List of submissions to the 70th Academy Awards for Best Foreign Language Film
- List of Luxembourgish submissions for the Academy Award for Best Foreign Language Film
