= Pol Cruchten =

Luxembourgish film director (1963–2019)

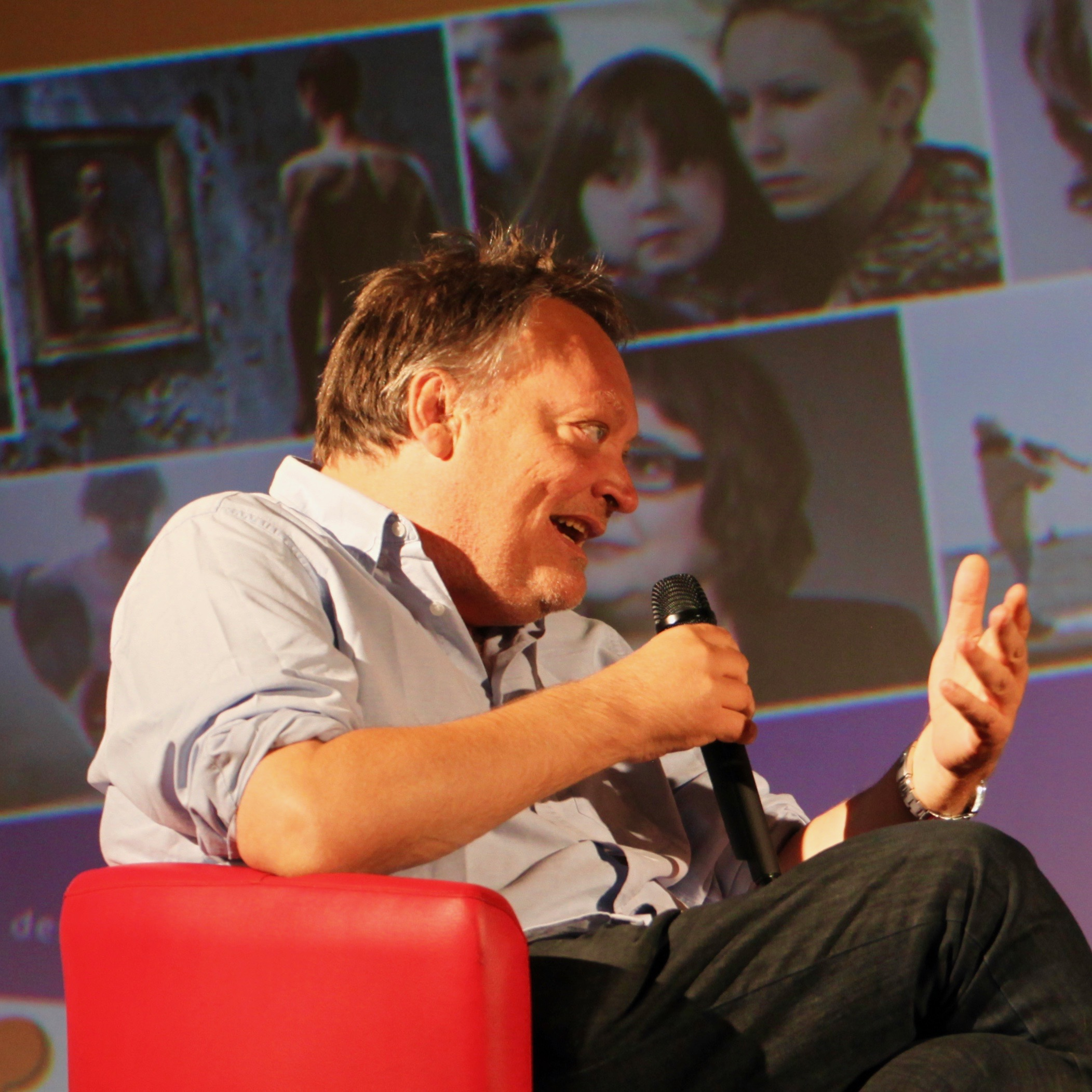
- Pol Cruchten, 2016
- Born: 30 July 1963; Pétange, Luxembourg
- Died: 3 July 2019 (aged 55)
- Occupations: Film director Film producer
- Years active: 1988–2019

Pol Cruchten (30 July 1963 – 3 July 2019) was a Luxembourgish film director and producer. His film Hochzäitsnuecht was screened in the Un Certain Regard section at the 1992 Cannes Film Festival.

== Filmography ==
- Somewhere in Europe (1988)
- Hochzaeitsnuecht (1992)
- Sniper (1994)
- Black Dju (1996)
- Boys on the Run (2001)
- Perl oder Pica (2006)
- Universalove (2008 - producer only)
- Never Die Young (2013)
- Voices from Chernobyl (2016)
