= Blind Spot (2012 film) =

2012 film

- Film poster
- Directed by: Christophe Wagner
- Written by: Jhemp Hoscheid; Frederic Zeimet; Christophe Wagner
- Produced by: Claude Waringo
- Starring: Jules Werner
- Cinematography: Jako Raybaut
- Edited by: Jean-Luc Simon
- Music by: André Mergenthaler
- Release date: 3 October 2012
- Running time: 96 minutes
- Country: Luxembourg
- Language: Luxembourgish

Blind Spot (Luxembourgish: Doudege Wénkel) is a 2012 Luxembourgish crime film directed by Christophe Wagner. The film was selected as the Luxembourgish entry for the Best Foreign Language Film at the 86th Academy Awards, but it was not nominated.

== Cast ==
- Jules Werner as Olivier Faber
- André Jung as Inspector Hastert
- Brigitte Urhausen as Da Silva
- Gilles Soeder as Roehmer
- Luc Feit as Schroeder
- Nicole Max as Carnevale
- Mickey Hardt as Tom Faber
- Patrick Descamps as Beaulieue
- Stefan Weinert as Huremovic

== See also ==
- List of submissions to the 86th Academy Awards for Best Foreign Language Film
- List of Luxembourgish submissions for the Academy Award for Best Foreign Language Film
