= Little Secrets (2006 film) =

Little Secrets (Perl oder Pica) is a 2006 Luxembourgish film directed by Pol Cruchten. It was Luxembourg's submission to the 80th Academy Awards for the Academy Award for Best Foreign Language Film, but was not accepted as a nominee.

== See also ==
- Cinema of Luxembourg
- List of submissions to the 80th Academy Awards for Best Foreign Language Film
