= Baby(a)lone =

2015 film by Donato Rotunno

- Directed by: Donato Rotunno
- Written by: Donato Rotunno
- Starring: Joshua Defays
- Release date: 11 March 2015
- Running time: 90 minutes
- Countries: Luxembourg; Belgium
- Language: Luxembourgish

Baby(a)lone is a 2015 Luxembourgish drama film directed by Donato Rotunno. It was selected as the Luxembourgish entry for the Best Foreign Language Film at the 88th Academy Awards but it was not nominated.

== Cast ==
- Joshua Defays as X
- Charlotte Elsen as Shirley
- Etienne Halsdorf as Johnny
- Gintare Parulyte as Nathalie
- Fabienne Elaine Hollwege as Sandra

== See also ==
- List of submissions to the 88th Academy Awards for Best Foreign Language Film
- List of Luxembourgish submissions for the Academy Award for Best Foreign Language Film
