= Voices from Chernobyl (film) =

2016 film

- Film poster
- Directed by: Pol Cruchten
- Written by: Pol Cruchten
- Release dates: 24 January 2016 (Trieste FF); 27 April 2016 (Luxembourg)
- Running time: 86 minutes
- Country: Luxembourg
- Language: French

Voices from Chernobyl (French: La supplication) is a 2016 Luxembourgish documentary film directed by Pol Cruchten, based on the 1997 oral history book by Nobel Prize winner Svetlana Alexievitch. It was selected as the Luxembourgian entry for the Best Foreign Language Film at the 89th Academy Awards but it was not nominated.

== See also ==
- List of submissions to the 89th Academy Awards for Best Foreign Language Film
- List of Luxembourgish submissions for the Academy Award for Best Foreign Language Film
