= Who's Quentin? =

- Official movie poster
- Directed by: Sacha Bachim
- Written by: Sacha Bachim
- Produced by: Sacha Bachim; Albert Engstfeld; Claude Kremer; Frédéric Schwandt
- Edited by: Sacha Bachim
- Distributed by: Feierblumm (prod)
- Release date: 2005
- Country: Luxembourg
- Language: Luxembourgish
- Budget: €5,500 (estimated)

Who's Quentin? is a 2005 Luxembourgish film written and directed by Sacha Bachim.

== Selected cast ==
- Steve Hoegener as Kevin
- Patrick Brücher as Knaschti
- Carole Biren as Zoé
- Claude Kremer as Samson
- Alexandra Linster as Lady in Black
- Maik Müller-Wulff as The Voice
- Marc Weidert as Petrus /Kleeschen
- Tammy Schmitz as Schutzengel /Felix
