= Back in Trouble =

1997 film

- Directed by: Andy Bausch
- Written by: Andy Bausch
- Starring: Thierry van Werveke
- Release date: 1997
- Running time: 95 minutes
- Country: Luxembourg
- Language: Luxembourgish

Back in Trouble is a 1997 Luxembourgish comedy film directed by Andy Bausch. The film was selected as the Luxembourgish entry for the Best Foreign Language Film at the 70th Academy Awards, but was not accepted as a nominee.

== Cast ==
- Thierry van Werveke as Johnny Chicago (Jacques Guddebouer)
- Ender Frings as Chuck Moreno
- Oscar Ortega Sánchez as Coco Moreno
- Nicole Max as Jenny Jakoby
- Dietmar Schönherr as Dinkelmann
- Sascha Ley as Juliette Kalmes-Moreno
- Claudine Thill as Camilla Drache
- Fatih Akin as Kebab-Fatih

== See also ==
- List of submissions to the 71st Academy Awards for Best Foreign Language Film
- List of Luxembourgish submissions for the Academy Award for Best Foreign Language Film
