= Gutland (film) =

2017 film

- Film poster
- Directed by: Govinda Van Maele
- Written by: Govinda Van Maele
- Produced by: Gilles Chanial; Olivier Dubois; Melanie Blocksdorf
- Starring: Frederick Lau; Vicky Krieps
- Cinematography: Narayan Van Maele
- Edited by: Stefan Stabenow
- Music by: Mocke
- Production companies: Les Films Fauves; Novak Prod; Propellerfilm
- Release dates: 8 September 2017 (TIFF); 2 May 2018 (Luxembourg)
- Running time: 107 minutes
- Countries: Luxembourg; Belgium; Germany
- Languages: Luxembourgish; German
- Budget: €3 million

Gutland is a 2017 internationally co-produced drama film directed by Govinda Van Maele. It was screened 8 September 2017 in the Discovery section at the 2017 Toronto International Film Festival. In Luxembourg the film was screened for the first time at the Luxembourg City Film Festival 2018. It was selected as the Luxembourgish entry for the Best Foreign Language Film at the 91st Academy Awards, but it was not nominated.

== Cast ==
- Frederick Lau as Jens Fauser
- Vicky Krieps as Lucy Loschetter
- Marco Lorenzini as Jos Gierens
- Pit Bukowski as Marcel
- Leo Folschette as Arno Kleyer

== Production ==
The film, for which a budget of 3 million euros was available, was shot in 37 days during December 2016. It was filmed around Herborn. The film was shot with 35mm. The film was inspired in part by Van Maele's experience growing up as the son of immigrant parents in a small Luxembourgish village.

== Reception ==
On review aggregator website Rotten Tomatoes, the film holds an approval rating of 88% based on 8 reviews, and an average rating of 6/10.

== See also ==
- List of submissions to the 91st Academy Awards for Best Foreign Language Film
- List of Luxembourgish submissions for the Academy Award for Best Foreign Language Film
