= Andy Bausch =

Luxembourgish film director

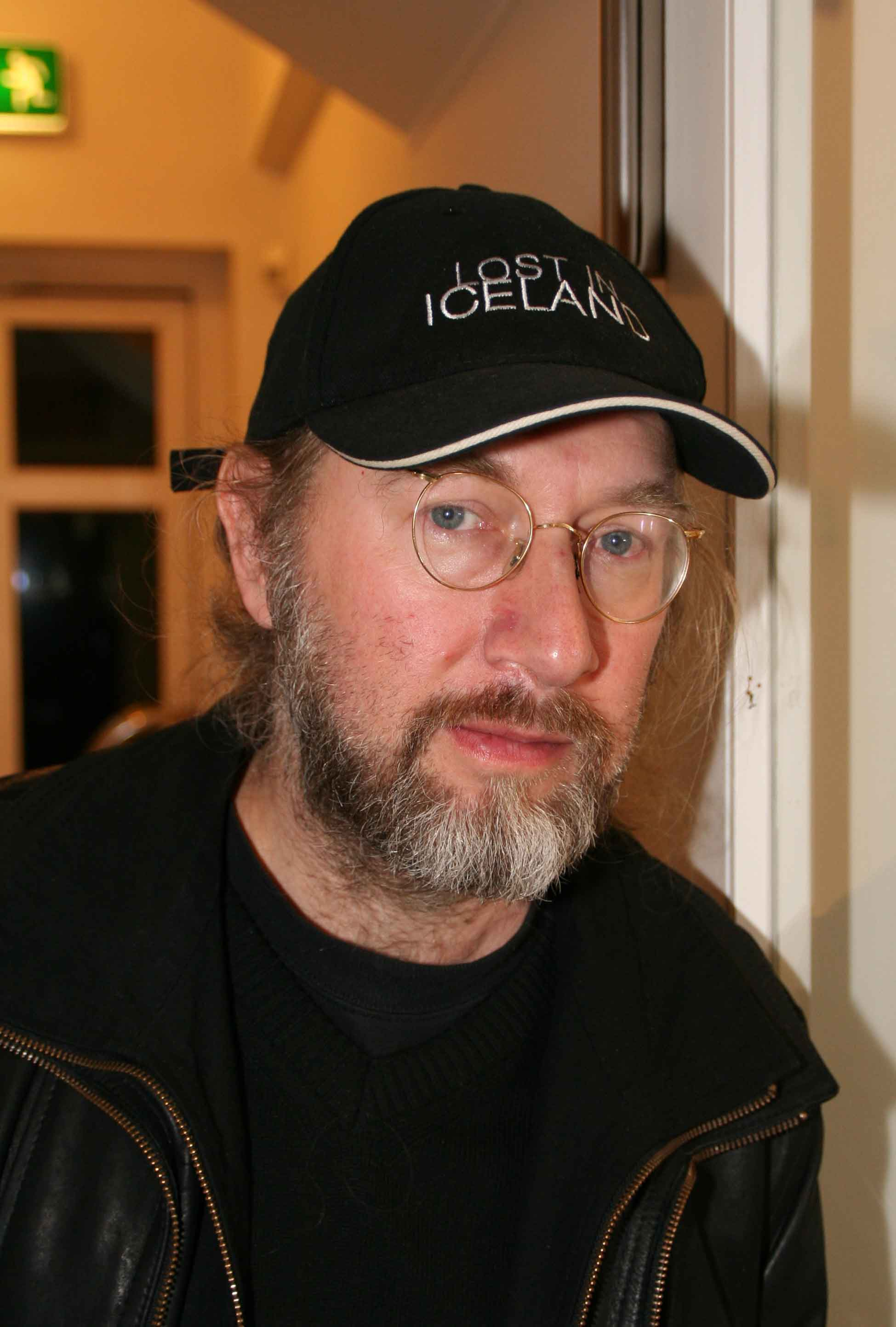
Andy Bausch.

Andy Bausch (born 12 April 1959 in Dudelange, Luxembourg) is a Luxembourgish film director. He studied painting and photography. Through interest in rock music he came into contact with cinema.

== Filmography as director ==
- Gwyncilla: Legend of Dark Ages (1986)
- Troublemaker (1988)
- A Wopbopaloobop A Lopbamboom (1989)
- Ex & Hopp (1991, TV film)
- Mit tödlicher Sicherheit (TV film, 1992)
- Struppi & Wolf (TV film, 1992)
- Three Shake-a-leg Steps to Heaven (1993)
- Die Männer vom K3 (2 TV episodes, 1993–1994)
- Fünf Millionen und ein paar Zerquetschte (TV film, 1994)
- Immer wenn sie Krimis liest (TV film, 1994)
- Doppelter Einsatz (5 TV episodes, 1995)
- Letters Unsent (1996)
- Back in Trouble (1997)
- Balko (3 TV episodes, 1999)
- HeliCops – Einsatz über Berlin (TV episode, 2000)
- Zwei Brüder (TV episode, 2001)
- The Unemployment Club (English title) (2001)
- L'Homme au cigare (2003)
- Dirty Sky (2003)
- La Revanche (2004)
- Visions of Europe (2004) (segment "The Language School")
- Deepfrozen (2006)
- Inthierryview (2008)
- Schockela Knätschgummi a brong Puppelcher (2010)
- Net Cool (2013)
