= Barry Mannakee =

Police officer and bodyguard to Diana, Princess of Wales (1947–1987)

- Born: Barry Albert Mannakee; 1 June 1947
- Died: 15 May 1987 (aged 39); Woodford, United Kingdom
- Cause of death: Spinal cord injury due to traffic collision
- Occupation(s): Police officer and bodyguard to Diana, Princess of Wales
- Employer(s): Royal Protection Squad, Diplomatic Protection Squad
- Spouse: Susan Bennett (m. 1966)
- Children: 2

Barry Albert Mannakee (1 June 1947 – 15 May 1987) was a British police officer with the Royal Protection Squad and bodyguard to Diana, Princess of Wales. Mannakee was transferred from his role as bodyguard for Diana following what was described as an "inappropriate" relationship between the two. Mannakee died in a road traffic accident in 1987, leading to a conspiracy theory that his death was not an accident. An inquest found no evidence of this.

== Personal life and career ==
Mannakee was a police officer with the Royal Protection Squad. In 1985, he became bodyguard to Diana, Princess of Wales. In 1986, he was transferred to Diplomatic Protection Group based in central London. Mannakee was married to Susan, and they had two daughters, Michelle and Clare.

== Diana, Princess of Wales ==
On a videotape recorded by the voice coach of Diana, Princess of Wales, Peter Settelen in 1992, Diana admitted that from 1985 through to 1986, she had been "deeply in love with someone who worked in this environment." Although she never used his name, it is thought she was referring to Mannakee. In 1986, Mannakee was transferred to the Diplomatic Protection Squad after his managers had determined his relationship with Diana had been "inappropriate" with Diana saying on the tape that Mannakee had been "chucked out" from his role as her bodyguard following suspicion that the two were having an affair. She said "I was only happy when he was around" and that his death was "the biggest blow of my life."

== Death ==
Shortly after 10 pm on 15 May 1987, Mannakee was killed on the way to his home in Loughton when the Suzuki motorbike he was riding as a passenger, driven by a fellow police officer Steven Peat, crashed into a Ford Fiesta driven by 17-year-old Nicola Chopp, who had passed her driving test six weeks earlier, on the A11 road in Woodford, north-east London. After waiting for a car to turn left, Chopp turned right across the motorbike's path. Peat swerved to avoid the car, but a collision occurred and Mannakee was catapulted into the rear side window of Chopp's car and died almost instantly after breaking his spine in two places. Peat and Chopp both survived. An inquest into Mannakee's death concluded it was an accident.

Conspiracy theories emerged surrounding the death of Mannakee, because he had been replaced as Diana's bodyguard after a suspected affair between the two. It was claimed that some of Mannakee's family believed that the security services were behind his death.

Chopp stated that she had been pressured into admitting responsibility for the collision, describing how, on the night of the incident, she saw "dazzling lights" from a 'mystery car' and said: "I have always wondered if some more sinister forces were at work that night, although I could never prove it. I believe, with conviction, I was not the cause of Barry Mannakee's death." However, no other vehicles were found to be involved.

In 2004, Lord Brocket said that, while he was serving a prison sentence for fraud, a fellow-prisoner who was a former police officer told him that forensic evidence in a secret file showed the Suzuki bike had been deliberately tampered with.

Peat said the crash was "nothing more" than an accident, a view shared by Mannakee's wife and the police officers who originally investigated the crash. William Langley of The Telegraph wrote that the ride home with Peat had been impromptu to save time and it was therefore unlikely the crash could have been planned.

The death of Mannakee was reinvestigated during the inquiry into the death of Diana, as part of Operation Paget, overseen by Sir John Stevens.

== See also ==
- List of people who died in traffic collisions
