= Angela Gallop =

British forensic scientist

Angela Gallop CBE FRSB
- Born: Angela Mary Cecilia Gallop; 2 January 1950 (age 76); Oxford, England
- Education: Headington School; University of Sheffield (BSc); University of Oxford (DPhil)
- Occupation: Forensic scientist
- Known for: Solving high-profile murder cases
- Scientific career
- Workplaces: University of Strathclyde
- Thesis: Chloroplast symbiosis (1975)
- Doctoral advisor: David Smith

Angela Mary Cecilia Gallop CBE FRSB (born 2 January 1950) is a British forensic scientist.

She began her career with the Forensic Science Service in 1974. Since 1986, she has run her own forensic service companies. Her findings helped solve notorious cases such as the deaths of Roberto Calvi, Rachel Nickell, Lynette White, Damilola Taylor, and Gareth Williams. She also took part in the investigation of the death of Diana, Princess of Wales, finding no evidence to support theories of a conspiracy. She was made Commander of the Order of the British Empire for her scientific contributions, detailed in her books, and has been portrayed on television.

== Early life and education ==
Gallop was born and raised in Oxford, England, and grew up "tomboyish", playing with her brothers, half-brothers and her chemistry set. Her parents, Eunice and Kenneth Knowles, divorced. She was educated at Headington School but performed poorly and barely qualified for the sixth form, where a botany teacher sparked her interest in science. She studied botany at the University of Sheffield and biochemistry at the University of Oxford. Gallop spent much of the early 1970s researching the biochemistry of chloroplasts in sea slugs on the Isle of Wight for her Doctor of Philosophy degree.

== Career ==
=== Forensic Science Service ===
Seeking a more popular field as well as a less repetitive job, Gallop became a senior biologist with the Forensic Science Service (FSS) in 1974. Aside from assistants and secretarial staff, she was one of few women in the laboratory; her boss did not think she could cope emotionally but her colleagues supported her. She visited her first crime scene in February 1978, looking for clues about the murder in Huddersfield of Helen Rytka, later confirmed as a victim of Peter Sutcliffe. She credits her determination "to give some relief to the family" to this case.

=== Forensic Access ===
By 1986, Gallop felt her workload was too large and her stimulation unsatisfactory, so she established her first company, Forensic Access. She intended to provide services to criminal defence lawyers, who could not rely on the FSS expertise at the time. Her advertisements initially yielded requests for infidelity investigations, which she carried out. By the end of 1986, her business had grown enough to have full-time employees and she moved her work from her home to a proper laboratory. She soon began investigating murder, assault, and arson cases as well as cold cases. She was commissioned by the defence in the trial of Robert Thompson for the murder of James Bulger.

By 1991, when she was hired to re-examine the evidence in the apparent suicide by hanging of Italian banker Roberto Calvi, Gallop had gained a reputation for her unconventional methods. Realizing that he shared Calvi's proportions, Gallop conducted experiments with her husband, fellow forensic scientist Russell Stockdale, that demonstrated that Calvi could not have hanged himself and that he was murdered. Nobody has been convicted, but Calvi's family were impressed by Gallop's work and consider her findings essential.

=== Forensic Alliance ===
Gallop founded another company, Forensic Alliance, in 1997, providing service to the police. In 1999, the company solved the 1988 murder of Lynette White after finding a microscopic flake of dried blood under two layers of new paint. The police began hiring Gallop whenever they needed to review significant cold cases. She was asked in 2003 to review the evidence in the 2000 killing of Damilola Taylor. In 2004, the Metropolitan Police commissioned her to have a look at the forensic evidence relating to the 1997 car crash deaths of Diana, Princess of Wales, and Dodi Fayed. Gallop found no grounds to support the claims of Fayed's father, Mohamed Al-Fayed, that the couple were killed in a conspiracy involving the British royal family. Gallop's analysis of Diana's stomach content proved to Operation Paget that Diana was not pregnant when she died.

Gallop discusses fibres and blood found in the Stephen Lawrence murder case
from the BBC programme The Life Scientific, 27 March 2012

When investigating the Pembrokeshire coastal path murders, Gallop prevailed upon the police to fund the expensive examination of trace evidence, which led to the conviction of the murderer. She considers this the most satisfying moment in her career and believes that the case would not have been solved without fiber examination. The same method proved successful when she was commissioned to investigate the 1993 murder of Stephen Lawrence, a black teenager.

She contributed evidence to the Macpherson inquiry, which found that the initial investigation of Lawrence's death failed due to institutional racism in the Metropolitan Police. She was commissioned for the case again in 2006, providing key evidence that led to convictions. Gallop has also commented on the investigation into the death of Gareth Williams, the Secret Intelligence Service operative who was found dead in suspicious circumstances at a Security Service safe house flat in Pimlico, London, in 2010. Other high-profile murder cases solved with Gallop's help include that of Rachel Nickell.

Besides murders, Gallop has been commissioned to investigate other kinds of criminal cases, including suspected incest, rapes, war crimes, and bestiality; in a particularly unusual case, she confirmed the presence of boar sperm in the abdomen of a man hospitalised with a punctured colon and peritonitis. She has also worked on the investigations of alleged alien abductions.

=== Axiom International and beyond ===
In 2010, Gallop helped found Axiom International, which provides forensic and related advice to law enforcement agencies worldwide. She is the firm's chief executive. She has since worked in Libya, Iraq, Somaliland and Kosovo.

To Gallop's dismay, the UK government closed the FSS in 2012 to save funds. According to Irish forensic scientist Niamh Nic Daéid, "some people in the business" blame Gallop for the demise of the FSS because she started a competing commercial alternative to it, but she thinks such conclusions are "a bit unfair". In Gallop's view, the FSS should have been "modernised and made properly commercial" rather than closed.

In late 2021, Gallop met John Actie, one of five black and mixed-race men who had been wrongly accused of the murder of Lynette White. He had spent two years in prison when Gallop's findings proved his innocence. This was her first meeting with someone she helped exonerate and was filmed for a Channel 5 documentary.

Gallop has reduced her involvement in frontline forensic work but has expressed an interest in taking on plenty of cold cases, including the disappearance of Madeleine McCann. In 2026 she was commissioned by Michael Stone's legal team to perform a forensic review of evidence in his case.

=== Other ventures ===
Gallop started writing to record her life's work and to highlight the lack of funding and recognition for forensic scientists. She detailed her early cases in a 2019 book titled When the Dogs Don’t Bark. A second book, How to Solve a Crime, came out in early 2022. She is careful about what she puts in her books and said that the inclusion of certain revealing elements of forensic technique "would make our job a lot more difficult".

Gallop is a visiting professor at the University of Strathclyde.

=== Awards and honours ===
Between 2001 and 2004, Gallop was president of the Forensic Science Society and in 2011 was awarded an honorary degree of Doctor of Science (D.Sc.) by Nottingham Trent University, in recognition of her contribution to national and international forensic science in the support of justice. Gallop has served on the Independent Police Commission, chaired by Lord Stevens.

Gallop was made Commander of the Order of the British Empire as part of the 2015 Queen's Birthday Honours.

=== Popular culture ===
Angela Gallop is portrayed by actor Anastasia Hille in the 2021 TV miniseries titled The Pembrokeshire Murders. Gallop praised Hille's talent but lamented the lack of "lightness" and "passion" in the character, observing that scientists are not constantly "very serious and very considered". She has also said that the cooperation with the police was not always so "very well mannered" and straightforward.

Gallop was also played by Nancy Carroll in the 2021 TV miniseries Stephen, a drama following the fight for justice for murdered teenager Stephen Lawrence.

Gallop was a guest on Desert Island Discs on 20 October 2022.

Gallop appeared on the 2023 Paramount+ show Murder of God's Banker.

=== Bibliography ===
- Gallop, Angela (2019). When the Dogs Don't Bark: A Forensic Scientist's Search for the Truth. Hachette UK. ISBN 978-1473678866.
- Gallop, Angela (2022). How to Solve a Crime: Stories from the Cutting Edge of Forensics. Hodder & Stoughton. ISBN 978-1529331363.
- Gallop, Angela (13 February 2020). "If the UK cares about justice, it must fund forensic services properly". The Guardian.

== Personal life ==
Gallop lives with her two Siamese cats in rural Oxfordshire. She retains an interest in sea slugs. She has been married twice and has a son. Angela Gallop and Russell Stockdale separated in 2003 but remained close. He died in late 2021.
