= Innocent Victims =

Statue of Princess Diana and Dodi Fayed displayed in Harrods between 2005–2018

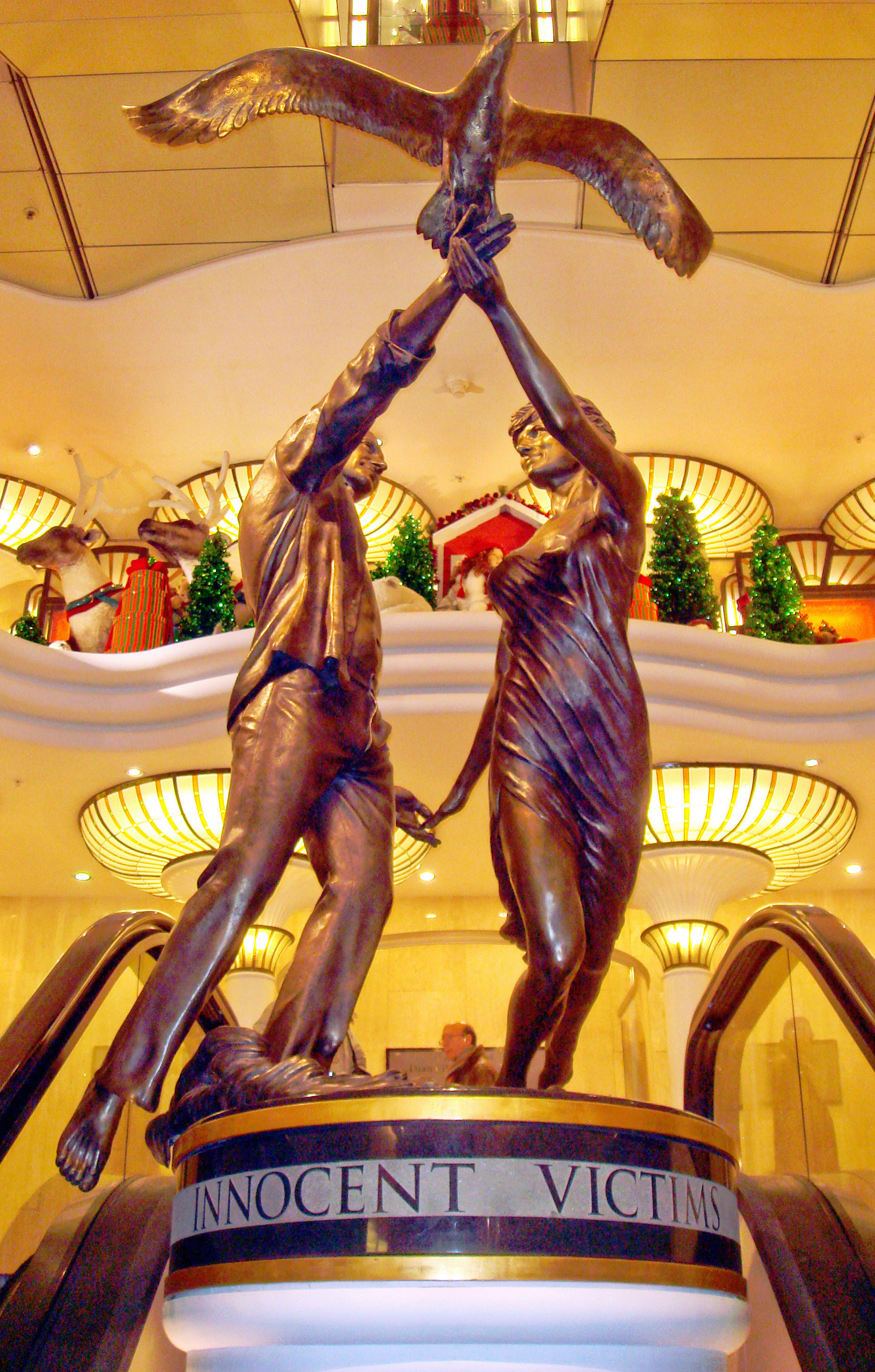
- The memorial in 2007
- Interactive map of Innocent Victims
- Location: Harrods department store, London
- Coordinates: 51°29′59″N 00°09′49″W
- Designer: William Mitchell
- Type: Sculpture
- Material: Bronze
- Dedicated to: Diana, Princess of Wales; Dodi Fayed

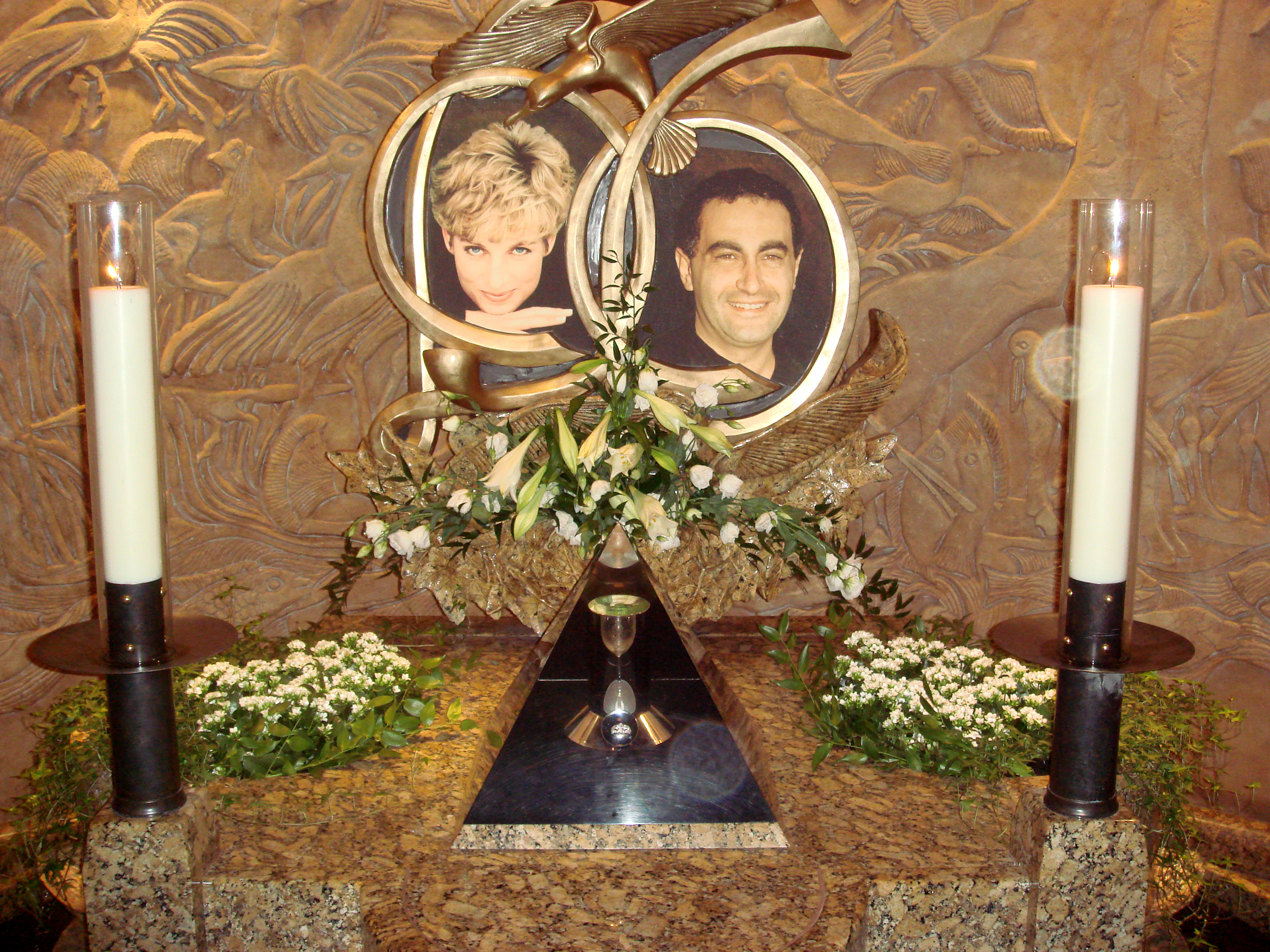
1998 memorial to Diana and Dodi in Harrods

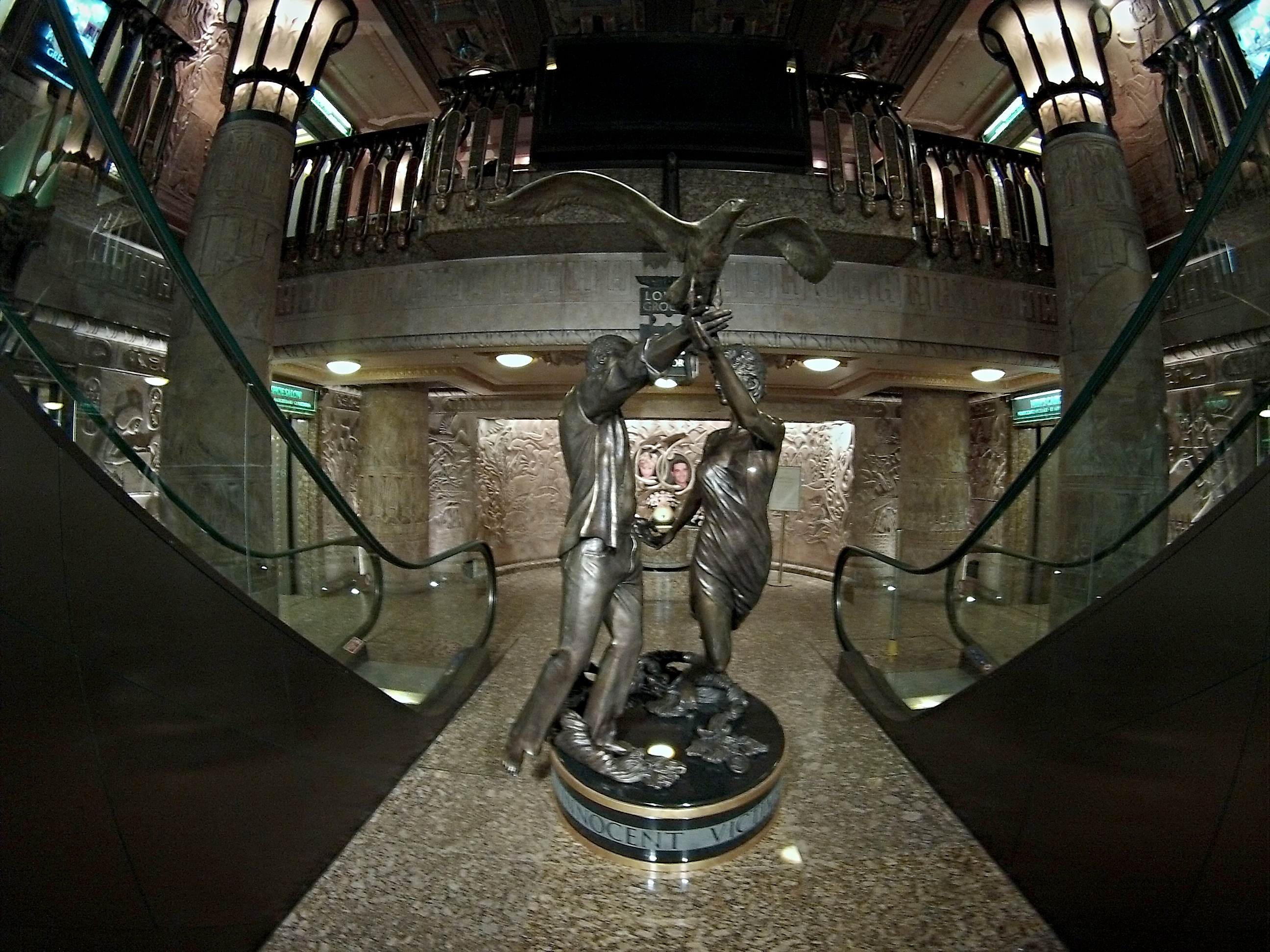
Alternative view showing the Egyptian carvings that form the background to both of the Dodi and Diana monuments

Innocent Victims is a bronze statue of Diana, Princess of Wales, and Dodi Fayed, which was on display at the Harrods department store in London, England, between 2005 and 2018. It was commissioned by Dodi's father Mohamed Al-Fayed when he owned Harrods, and designed by William Mitchell.

== Background ==
The statue is the second of two memorials in Harrods to Diana, Princess of Wales, and Dodi Fayed, both commissioned by Mohamed Al-Fayed, Dodi's father, who owned the store from 1985 to 2010. The first memorial, unveiled in April 1998, is a pyramid-shaped display containing photos of Dodi and Diana, a wine glass said to be from their final dinner, and a ring said to have been purchased by Dodi the day before the crash in which they both died.

== Design and creation ==
The statue was designed by London-born sculptor William Mitchell, who had worked for the Al-Fayed family for more than 40 years, and was cast in bronze using the lost wax method at the Bronze Age Foundry in East London. It depicts Diana and Dodi facing each other, clad in loose clothing that clings to their bodies. They are said to be dancing in Mediterranean waves. Dodi's right arm is raised and appears to be releasing a large bird, said to be an albatross symbolising "freedom and eternity". Diana's left arm is also raised, gripping Dodi's hand. Their other arms are below their waists, the fingers just touching. There is a forward momentum in their poses, Diana's right leg bent and exposed by a dress cut to the top of her thigh. Dodi's right leg is completely off the base of the statue. Both are barefoot. The inner curve of the wings of the bird has been described as forming a double D. The statue drew criticism for its perceived lack of artistic merit.

Mitchell also designed the Egyptian escalator at Harrods and the associated carvings, which form the background to both of the Dodi and Diana monuments.

== Unveiling ==
At the time of its unveiling in September 2005, Al-Fayed, who had maintained that the deaths were not an accident although an official investigation ruled out foul play, said:

As we approach the eighth anniversary of Diana and Dodi's untimely death and in the absence of any further official memorial for these two victims – apart from the highly criticised fountain in Hyde Park – I wanted to keep their spirits alive with a further gesture ... I have named the sculpture Innocent Victims because for eight years I have fought to prove that my son and Princess Diana were murdered.

== Location ==
In January 2018, it was announced by Harrods that the statue would be returned to the Al-Fayed family, seven years after Mohamed Al-Fayed sold Harrods to the Qatar Investment Authority. The store's manager at the time, Michael Ward, said it was appropriate to return the statue to Mohamed Al-Fayed, given that a new public memorial had been commissioned at Kensington Palace by princes William and Harry. At the time of the unveiling, Al-Fayed had claimed that the statue would stay at Harrods forever. The Qatari owners were eager to regain the patronage of the British royal family, Harrods having been royal warrant holders continuously from 1913 to 2000 until "the ugly aftermath" of the death of Diana and Dodi. In 2000, Mohamed Al-Fayed had broken commercial ties between Harrods and the Royal Family when he removed the royal warrants and had them burned.
