= Unlawful Killing (film) =

British documentary film (2011)

- Directed by: Keith Allen
- Written by: Victor Lewis-Smith and Paul Sparks
- Production companies: Associated-Rediffusion; Allied Stars Ltd
- Release date: 13 May 2011
- Country: United Kingdom
- Language: English

Unlawful Killing is a 2011 British documentary film about the deaths of Diana, Princess of Wales, and Dodi Fayed on 31 August 1997 directed by Keith Allen and financed by Dodi's father Mohamed Al-Fayed at a reported cost of £2.5m. It had a single trade screening during the 2011 Cannes Film Festival.

The film argues that the British and French authorities covered up uncomfortable facts about the crash, accuses Queen Elizabeth II and Princess Margaret of being "gangsters in tiaras", and alleges that Prince Philip was a psychopath, in the mould of British serial killer Fred West, who orchestrated the murder of Diana and Dodi. It also alleges that Diana's life could have been saved had she been taken to hospital quickly and efficiently, and condemns the inquest into her death for failing to investigate why this action was not taken. It perpetuates the long-standing allegation by Al-Fayed that the British royal family was opposed to Diana's relationship with Dodi due to his Muslim faith. Allen screened the film to invited journalists in Cannes during May 2011. He told a press conference: "I didn't want to make a sensationalist film, I don't believe it is a sensationalist film. I think it is a very forensic analysis of a process, a British legal process, and I think it reveals things that, I'm sorry, don't add up."

Martyn Gregory, author of a book on the Princess of Wales's last days, has described the film as "ludicrous". He said: "It simply regurgitates everything Mohamed Fayed has been saying since the year 2000. It is rehearsing the Planet Fayed view." Lawyers asked to advise on the film by the producers said it would need 87 cuts before the film could be certified for release in the United Kingdom. It was not shown there. However, Allen believed that it would make money in the US, where conspiracy theories about Diana's death still have a following. Despite this optimism, it proved impossible to gain insurance against possible litigation in the United States, and the film was withdrawn.
