= Conspiracy theories about the death of Diana, Princess of Wales =

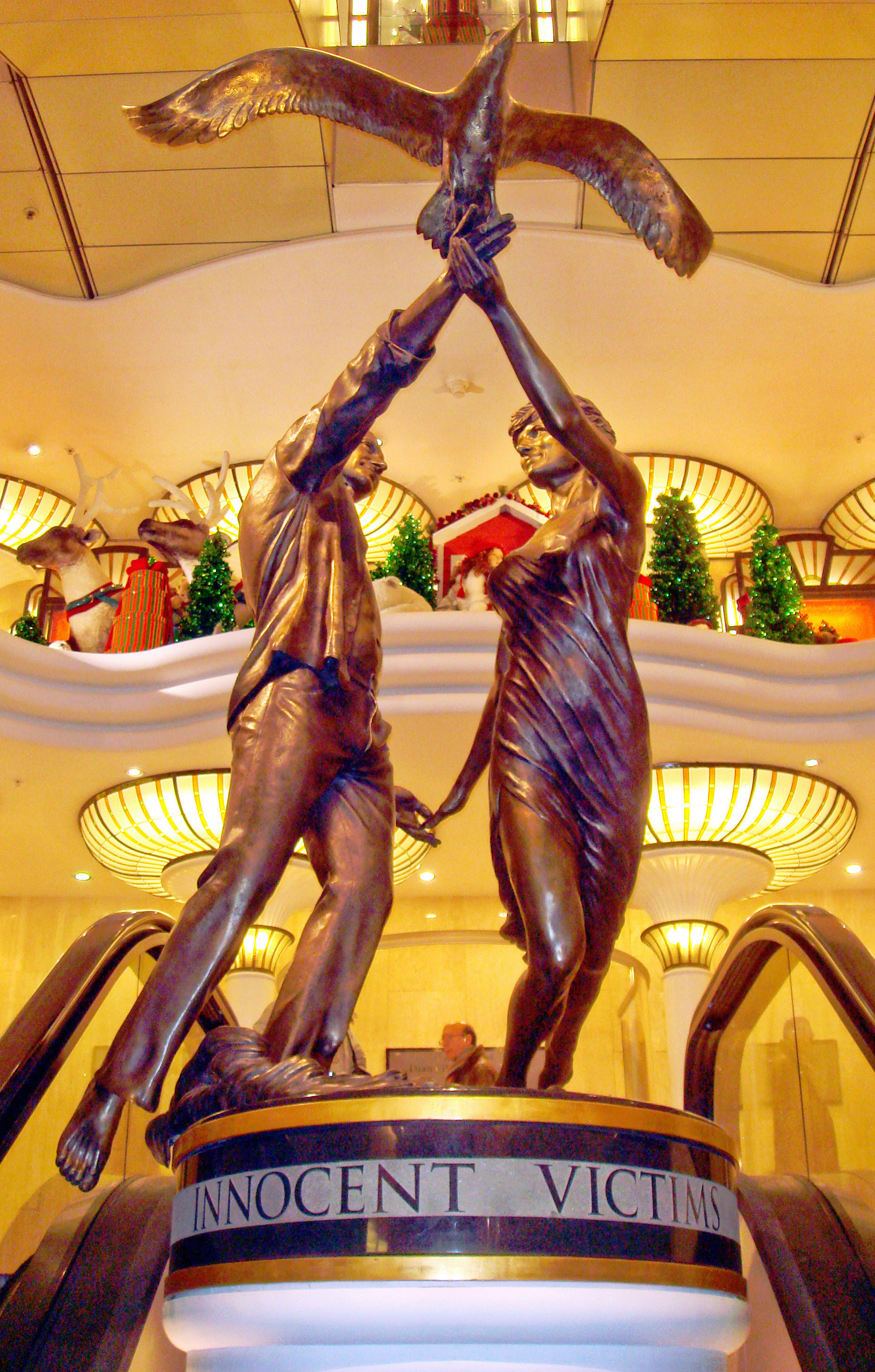
Innocent Victims, one of two memorials previously displayed in Harrods

There are many conspiracy theories surrounding the death of Diana, Princess of Wales, on 31 August 1997. Official investigations in both Britain and France found that Diana died in a manner consistent with media reports following the fatal car crash in Paris. In 1999, a French investigation concluded that Diana died as the result of a crash; French investigating judge Hervé Stéphan concluded that the paparazzi were some distance from the Mercedes S280 when it crashed and were not responsible for manslaughter. After hearing evidence at the British inquest, a jury in 2008 returned a verdict of "unlawful killing" by driver Henri Paul and the paparazzi pursuing the car. The jury's verdict also stated: "In addition, the death of the deceased was caused or contributed to by the fact that the deceased were not wearing a seat belt and by the fact that the Mercedes struck the pillar in the Pont de l'Alma tunnel rather than colliding with something else."

Active in disputing the official version of events were the British tabloid newspaper the Daily Express and Egyptian businessman Mohamed Al-Fayed, whose son, Dodi, was Diana's partner at the time and also died in the crash. In 2003, Diana's butler, Paul Burrell, published a note that he claimed had been written by Diana in 1995, in which there were allegations that her husband was "planning 'an accident' in [Diana's] car, brake failure and serious head injury" so that he could marry again. She had allegedly expressed similar concerns to Lord Mishcon, her solicitor, that "reliable sources" had told her "that she and Camilla would be put aside" for Charles to marry Tiggy Legge-Bourke. Until a synod of 2002, the Anglican Church prohibited divorced people remarrying. The allegations were later revealed to have been among the smears spread by journalist Martin Bashir to secure an interview with Diana for the BBC.

A special Metropolitan Police inquiry team was established in 2004, Operation Paget, headed by Commissioner John Stevens to investigate the various conspiracy theories which led to the British inquest. This investigation looked into 175 conspiracy claims that had been made by Fayed. In 2005, Charles, as a witness, told Stevens that he did not know about his former wife's note from 1995 and could not understand why she had these feelings. Fayed persistently propounded what were found to be conspiracy theories at the inquest, and repeatedly claimed that he believed his son was murdered with Diana.

== Henri Paul ==
=== Security service connections ===
Theorists have alleged that the driver of the Mercedes-Benz W140, Henri Paul, was in the pay of a national security service, though different versions of the allegation name the country of the security service alternately as Britain, France or the United States. Evidence purported to support this arose mainly from money in his possession at the time of his death, and his personal wealth. These allegations are covered in chapter four of the Operation Paget criminal investigation report. Mohamed Al-Fayed claimed that Henri Paul was working for MI6 and that they set him up. The inquiry found no evidence Henri Paul was an agent for any security service.

=== Blood samples ===
Another allegation concerns the reliability of blood tests carried out, which indicated Paul had been drinking before he took the controls of the car. The French investigators' conclusion that Paul was drunk was made on the basis of an analysis of blood samples, which were said to contain an alcohol level that was more than three times the French legal limit. This initial analysis was challenged by a British pathologist hired by Al-Fayed. In response, French authorities carried out a third test, this time using the more medically conclusive vitreous fluid from inside the eye, which matched the level of alcohol measured by blood and also revealed Paul had been taking antidepressants.

It has been claimed that the level of alcohol reported to have been found in Paul's blood was inconsistent with his sober demeanor, as captured on the CCTV of the Ritz that evening. Robert Forrest, a forensic pathologist, said that an alcoholic like Paul, with a higher tolerance for alcohol, would be able to appear more sober than he actually was. The families of Dodi Fayed and Henri Paul did not accept the findings of the French investigation.

It was disclosed in 2006 that Lord Stevens had met Paul's elderly parents and told them that their son was not drunk. Just prior to Stevens's appearance at the inquest, a source close to Stevens stated that this inconsistency could be explained as him being "considerate" and "sensitive" towards the elderly couple, an assessment Scott Baker suggested might be credible in his opening comments to the jury. Under cross-examination at the British inquest in 2008, Stevens denied "deliberately misleading" Paul's parents and said that the chauffeur's condition at the time of the crash did not match the police's definition of being drunk, which he said relied upon someone's physical responses. Stevens said that the available evidence suggested Paul had consumed only two alcoholic drinks, but this was not necessarily all that Paul had consumed, and that he was "under the influence" of alcohol at the time of the crash. An expert cited in the report estimated that Paul had drunk the equivalent of five measures of Ricard, his favourite liquorice-flavoured French aperitif, before driving.

Conspiracy theorists have also cited "rumours about the high levels of carbon monoxide found in Henri Paul's blood as indicating that something sinister happened, either to Henri Paul or to his blood samples", and claim that "had Paul really had such high levels of carbon monoxide in his blood, he could not have functioned at all, let alone driven a car." In two French TOXLAB tests which established the level of carbon monoxide in Paul's blood, one showed a level of 12.8% carboxyhaemoglobin saturation, which occurs when blood's iron-carrying pigment (haemoglobin) is bound with carbon monoxide (instead of oxygen). "A nonsmoker has about 1 percent of carbon monoxide in his/her blood, whereas smokers will routinely have a level of 8-10 percent or more if they have recently smoked." Paul had been smoking small cigarillo cigars in the hours before the crash. However, the second test, which has been cited by the opponents of the official findings, showed Paul's carboxyhaemoglobin saturation at a level of 20.7% at the time of his death. In the ITV documentary Diana - Secrets Behind the Crash, broadcast on 3 June 1998, "Dr. Alister Hay, introduced as a Carbon Monoxide Expert, told viewers that carbon monoxide disperses at the rate of 'about half every four or five hours.' So, in other words, the level of 20.7 percent found during Paul's autopsy could have been 40 percent several hours earlier when he died. Had Henri Paul really had 40 percent carbon monoxide in his system, it would have been impossible for him to function at all, according to Dr. Hay, let alone drive a car. A level of 20–30 percent produces strong headaches, and a level of 30–40 percent would cause nausea, vertigo and vomiting."

In 1999, investigators claimed that the high carbon monoxide level was likely "due to Paul inhaling gas from the car's air bags" after the crash, although according to Dr. Murray Mackay, "one of the world's leading crash investigators [...] the airbags used in the type of car in which Paul died do not contain any carbon-monoxide", and "it would not have been possible for Paul to have inhaled a sufficient quantity of gas, as the autopsy had established that he had died instantly." However, Dr. Murray nonetheless maintains "that both the levels of carbon monoxide found by the French scientists in Henri Paul's blood were 'perfectly explainable and unremarkable'", and that "mundane factors, such as Paul's intake of tobacco shortly before his death, were the most likely cause of the 20.7 percent reading."

Claims circulated in news media in November 2006 that the blood samples tested did not belong to Paul but were taken from a suicide victim. However, DNA testing ordered by French authorities in response appeared to confirm that the blood samples with high alcohol levels were from Paul. The tests compared the samples with DNA provided by Paul's parents. However, the DNA test results were challenged at Diana's 2008 British inquest. The coroner, Lord Justice Scott Baker, acknowledged that there were issues with the DNA tests and told the jury:

No one can say to you 'there is a bottle of blood to have come from Henri Paul, half of it was tested for alcohol and gave a reading of X, the other half went for DNA testing and matched Henri Paul'. It was never done and it is not feasible to do any further tests.

Nevertheless, the jury's verdict identified Paul's drunk driving as contributing to the crash.

== Tomlinson's allegation of MI6 involvement ==
Richard Tomlinson, a former MI6 officer who was dismissed from the intelligence services and later served five months in prison for breaching the Official Secrets Act 1989, claimed in a sworn statement to the French inquiry in May 1999 that Britain's MI6 had been involved in the crash, suggesting that the security service had documentation which would assist Judge Stephan in his inquiry. The previous August, he had been reported by the BBC to have claimed that Paul was working for the security services and that one of Diana's bodyguards, either Trevor Rees-Jones (now known as Trevor Rees) or Kes Wingfield, was a contact for British intelligence. Tomlinson alleged that MI6 was monitoring Diana before her death, had told Mohamed Al-Fayed that Paul was an MI6 agent, and that her death mirrored plans he saw in 1992 for the assassination of then President of Serbia Slobodan Milošević, using a strobe light to blind his chauffeur.

On 13 February 2008, Tomlinson told the inquest that he may have misremembered and that he had no evidence that Paul was an MI6 agent, but he had said in the previous day's court session that Paul was supplying MI6 with information. Speaking by video-link from France, Tomlinson conceded that, after the interval of 16 or 17 years, he "could not remember specifically" whether the document he had seen during 1992 had in fact proposed the use of a strobe light to cause a traffic crash as a means of assassinating Milošević, although use of lights for this purpose had been covered in his MI6 training. The Operation Paget Inquiry was given unprecedented access to the offices of both MI5 and MI6 to investigate Tomlinson's claims. It was later revealed that the mentioned memo was a proposal written in March 1993 to assassinate another Serbian figure if he gained power, not Milošević. Furthermore, the plan did not involve anything about using flashlights.

Further evidence discrediting Tomlinson's claims was found in drafts of a book he was writing about his time in MI6 before he was jailed in 1998 for breaching the Official Secrets Act. The draft, dating from 1996, referred to the memo and contained none of the detail about a staged car crash with flashlights in a tunnel.

The inquest was later told by an anonymous MI6 manager (referred to during proceedings as "Miss X") that MI6 were not keeping any file on either the Princess or Dodi, and that there was no plan involving them. The inquiry concluded by dismissing Tomlinson's claims as an embellishment. It went on to comment that this embellishment was largely responsible for giving rise to the theories Diana was murdered.

Tomlinson was arrested by French authorities in July 2006 as part of their inquiry into the death of Diana. French police were also reported to have seized computer files and personal papers from his home in Cannes.

== Relationship with Dodi Fayed ==
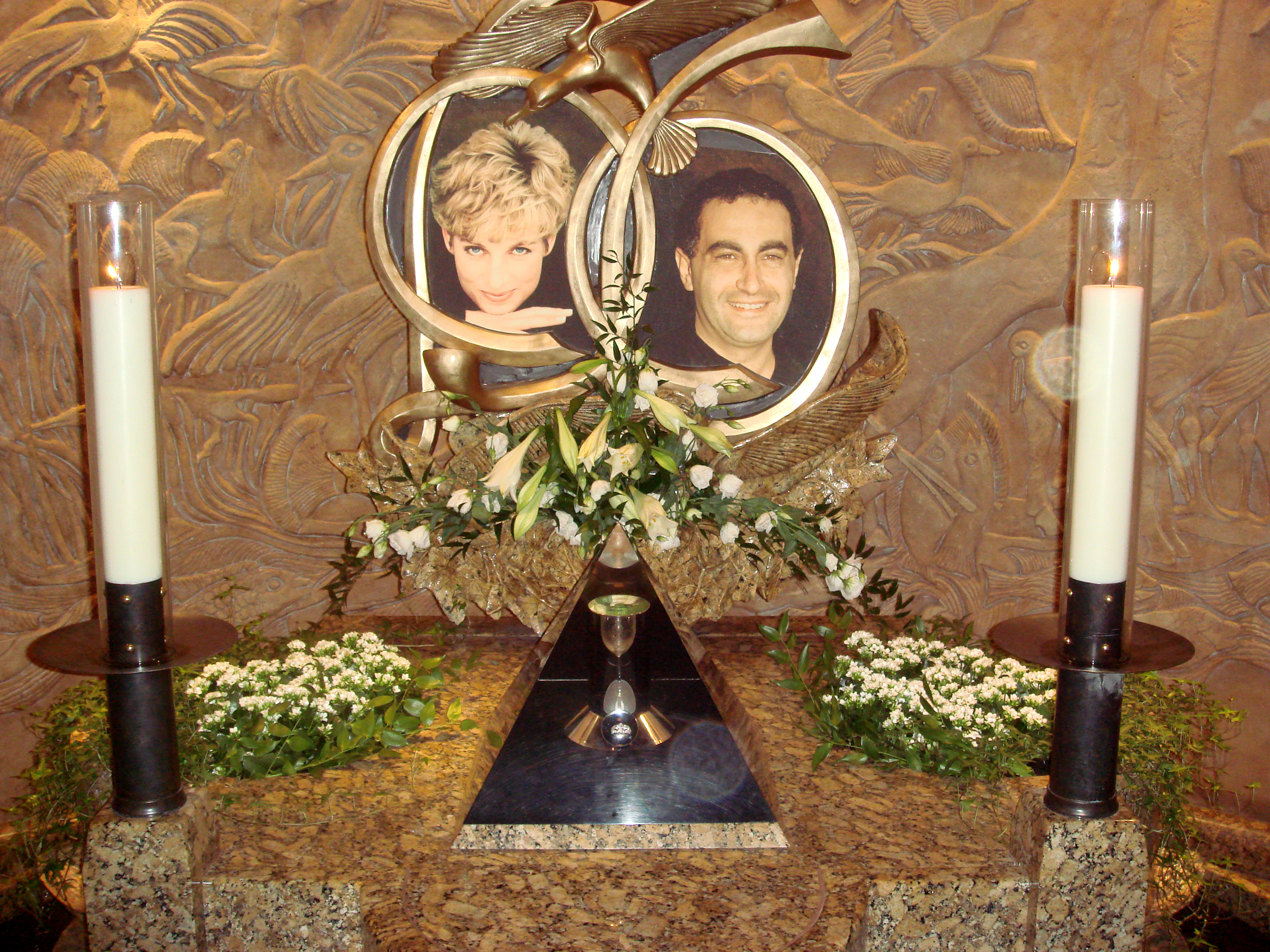
1998 memorial to Diana and Dodi

One of the main motives which has been advanced for alleged murder includes suggestions Diana was pregnant with Mohamed "Dodi" Fayed's child and the couple were about to get engaged. The alleged dislike of the idea of a non-Christian within the British royal family meant such a relationship between the mother of the future king and an Egyptian Muslim would not be tolerated. In Mohamed Al-Fayed's view, which he repeated in court at the inquest in February 2008, Prince Philip, Prince Charles (the future King Charles III), Diana's sister Lady Sarah McCorquodale and numerous others were all involved in a plot to kill the Princess and his son. Jeffrey Steinberg of the Executive Intelligence Review (EIR), a publication of the American Lyndon LaRouche movement, has also put forward theories that the Princess of Wales was murdered by the security services under the instructions of Prince Philip. An article in The Daily Telegraph in 1998 reporting the EIR conspiracy theories alleged earlier links between the EIR and Al-Fayed, while Francis Wheen reported the following year that Al-Fayed's spokesman had advised journalists to contact Steinberg.

Al-Fayed made the assertion in television interviews that the couple were going to announce their engagement on the Monday after the crash, 1 September 1997. Operation Paget commented that an announcement of such magnitude from the Princess of Wales would have been a substantial media event of worldwide interest and would have required significant preparation. No evidence was found that any such preparation had been made.

CCTV evidence shown at the inquest indicates that Dodi left Repossi jewellers on the 30 August with nothing more than a catalogue. Alberto Repossi said in 2003 that the ring had been placed on Diana's finger in a St Tropez hotel, and was being resized for future collection in Paris, but later admitted to writer Martyn Gregory that he had received "legal papers" from Al-Fayed, a client for more than 20 years. Al-Fayed said the couple chose the ring in Monte Carlo, and Dodi had picked it up in Paris the day before he died after it had been altered. This statement of Al-Fayed was contradicted by the statements of Claude Roulet, a shop assistant, and the CCTV footage. A CCTV recording demonstrated that a ring had been selected by a Ritz hotel official. It was bought by Mohammed Al-Fayed after the couple's death.

A few hours before the crash, on the afternoon of 30 August, Diana's journalist friend Richard Kay received a call on his mobile phone from Diana in which she asked about what was likely to appear in the following day's Sunday papers about her. During this call, she made no mention of any announcement she intended to make.

More revealing was the statement given by Diana's eldest sister, Lady Sarah McCorquodale, who testified that in a phone conversation with Diana on Friday 29 August, Diana spoke about Dodi Fayed in a manner that gave her sister the impression the relationship was on "stony ground". Statements from other friends and confidantes Diana spoke to in the week before her death, including her butler Paul Burrell, her friend Lady Annabel Goldsmith, and her spiritual adviser Rita Rogers, were unanimous that she was firm about not wanting to get engaged or married to anyone at that point in her life. A week before she died, the princess had told Goldsmith: "I need marriage like a rash on my face."

Diana's former private secretary, Patrick Jephson, said to the BBC in reaction to the publication of the Operation Paget Report in December 2006 that her facial expression in the CCTV footage of her at the Paris Ritz on her final evening with Dodi Fayed was one she would wear when she was disgruntled with a situation. However, CCTV images released on 6 October taken just minutes before their deaths, show a relaxed Diana and Dodi affectionately holding hands.

An inquiry witness was Hasnat Khan, a Muslim heart surgeon of Pakistani origin based in London, who had a relationship with Diana for two years. Diana had explored the possibility of marriage with him. This had been met with no opposition from the royal family and then-Prince Charles had given his blessing. Khan stated that he had received some racist hate mail from members of the public because of the relationship but had no reason to take what was said in this hate mail seriously. He also stated that he felt the relationship was not opposed by the royal family or any other branch of the British Government including the security services. Paul Burrell stated that Diana was still not over her break-up with Khan at the time of her death. It was also pointed out that Dodi and Diana had met only just under seven weeks before the crash, at Al-Fayed's villa in St. Tropez on 14 July, meaning there were only 47 days from their first meeting until the night of the crash. Of those days, their schedules permitted them to be together for an absolute maximum of 35 days. From analysis of Diana's actual movements, it is likely they had spent approximately 23 days together before the crash.

John Macnamara, a former senior detective at Scotland Yard, headed Al-Fayed's own investigation for five years from 1997. Cross-examined at the inquest on 14 February, he conceded that he had found no evidence of a criminal conspiracy to kill the Princess, or that she was engaged or pregnant at the time of her death, apart from the claims Al-Fayed had relayed to him.

=== Pregnancy ===
In January 2004, the former coroner of the Queen's Household, John Burton, said (in an interview with The Times) that he attended a post-mortem examination of the Princess's body at Fulham mortuary, where he personally examined her womb and found her not to be pregnant. Robert Chapman, who carried out the post-mortem examination, stated that Diana's womb and ovaries showed no sign of pregnancy.

In an effort to examine the assertions made by Al-Fayed, Operation Paget had scientific tests carried out on pre-transfusion blood found in the footwell of the seat in the wrecked Mercedes the Princess of Wales occupied at the time of the crash. This blood was found to have no trace of the hCG hormone associated with pregnancy. The inquiry also extensively interviewed friends of Diana's who were in close contact with her in the weeks leading up to her death. The evidence obtained from these witnesses was of a very sensitive nature and most of it was not included in Operation Paget's criminal investigation report. However, it was reported that friends said she was in her normal menstrual cycle and there was evidence she was using contraception.

Al-Fayed's persistence in asserting Diana was pregnant led him to get members of his staff to tell the media that on their final day together, Diana and his son had visited a villa he owned in Paris to choose a room "for the baby". While the couple had indeed visited the villa, the circumstances of the visit were exaggerated to say it had lasted two hours and that it was in the presence of a prominent Italian interior designer. A security guard at the villa, Reuben Murrell, felt uncomfortable lying about the matter and sold his story to The Sun stating that the visit lasted just under thirty minutes and was not in the company of any interior designer. He provided stills from CCTV to prove this and said he had been in the presence of Diana and Dodi for the entirety of their visit, with there having been no conversation about them coming to live at the villa. He later resigned from Al-Fayed's employment and initiated an employment tribunal for constructive dismissal after Al-Fayed successfully sued him for breach of contract because of the CCTV images he supplied to The Sun. Senior members of Al-Fayed's staff made derogatory comments about Murrell and Trevor Rees-Jones in their statements to Operation Paget. In 2004, a Channel 4 documentary, The Diana Conspiracy, claimed that the butler at the villa who, in a June 1998 interview with the ITV documentary Diana: Secrets Behind the Crash, claimed to have shown the couple around with their intent being to live there, was not even present at the villa on that day as he was on vacation.

Al-Fayed first claimed that the Princess of Wales was pregnant at the time of her death to the Daily Express in May 2001. "If it is true, it is strange that he sat upon this important information for three and a half years," Scott Baker said at the inquest.

== Absence of CCTV images ==
The absence of CCTV images showing the Mercedes's journey from the hotel to the crash site has been frequently cited as evidence of an organised conspiracy. According to The Independent newspaper in 2006, there were more than 14 CCTV cameras in the Pont de l'Alma underpass, though none recorded footage of the fatal collision.

Judge Hervé Stéphan was appointed as Examining Magistrate in this case on 2 September 1997. On that day, by Judicial Order, he tasked the Brigade Criminelle with identifying all video and photographic images along the route taken by the Mercedes. Lieutenant Eric Gigou of the Brigade Criminelle led the team that carried out that work, initially by retracing the route several times and drawing up a list of possible locations. His report showed that the team identified ten locations of CCTV cameras. None of these had any images relevant to the inquiry, since they were principally security cameras facing the entrances to buildings. Most of the cameras were not maintained by the City of Paris; the owners of the buildings to which they were attached operated them privately. There was a traffic-monitoring camera above the underpass in the Place de l'Alma itself but this was under the control of la Compagnie de Circulation Urbaine de Paris (Paris Urban Traffic Unit). That department closed down at about 11 p.m., had no night duty staff and made no recordings. Officers in the Police Headquarters Information and Command Centre could continue to view the pictures shown by the traffic camera in real time but could not control it.

The subject of the CCTV cameras is dealt with in Chapter 5 of the Operation Paget report. It was also found that a photograph that was published in a book by David Cohen Diana: Death of a Goddess and captioned as having been taken just before the car entered the tunnel was in fact taken by a photographer as the car left the back of the Paris Ritz.

== White Fiat Uno and James Andanson ==
Analysis of the wreckage of the Mercedes revealed it had glancing contact with a white Fiat Uno car which left traces of paint on the Mercedes bodywork. Extensive attempts by the French police to find the vehicle involved were unsuccessful. Although no one had seen the Fiat in the tunnel, some witnesses reported seeing an Uno exiting the tunnel.

Mohamed Al-Fayed alleged in his July 2005 statement to Operation Paget, and at other times, that the white Fiat Uno was being used by MI6 as a means of causing the Mercedes to swerve and thereby crash into the side of the tunnel. Al-Fayed further alleged that the Fiat Uno was owned by a French photojournalist named Jean-Paul James Andanson, a security services agent according to Al-Fayed, who had photographed Diana while she was at his villa in St. Tropez in July 1997. Andanson's death in May 2000, Al-Fayed claimed, was either due to guilt over what he had done or because he was assassinated by the French or British security services to silence him.

Operation Paget found that the white Fiat Uno Andanson owned was in an unroadworthy condition, being nine years old at the time, with 325,000 kilometres (202,000 mi) on the odometer (suggesting that the car had been driven 27,000 miles per annum) and had not been maintained for several years prior. Andanson's neighbours confirmed the veracity of this evidence. Andanson had sold the car in October 1997. Operation Paget concluded it was extremely unlikely due to the car's condition and the fact Andanson had so openly disposed of it that it was the one at the scene of the crash in Paris. French police had examined Andanson's car as part of their effort to trace the one that had come into contact with the Mercedes with a view to prosecuting the driver for failing to render assistance and had reached the same conclusion. The French police spent a year after the crash searching for the vehicle and eliminated over 4,000 white Fiat Unos from their inquiry. Operation Paget decided it would be unlikely that renewed enquiries would identify the vehicle involved, as such a long period had elapsed since the crash. It concluded the threat of prosecution for a custodial offence probably deterred the driver from coming forward at the time.

A retired major in the French Brigade Criminelle, Jean Claude Mules, gave evidence to the inquest in February 2008. Andanson had been interviewed by French police in February 1998, and had been able to provide documentary evidence about his movements on the previous 30 and 31 August which had satisfied them that he could not have been the driver of the Fiat Uno involved. These demonstrated that Andanson could only have been at his home in Lignieres, 177 mi (285 km) from Paris, at the time of the crash. Elizabeth, his widow, said at the London inquest in February 2008 that her husband had been at home in bed with her at the time of the crash.

=== Andanson's suicide ===
Andanson died in May 2000. The official verdict was suicide. His body was found in a black, burnt-out BMW in a forest near the town of Nant, near Millau, in Southern France. Andanson's death was attributed to problems in his private life. The 2008 inquest into the death of the Princess of Wales heard that evidence was uncovered from his friends and associates that prior to his death he had talked of suicide by pouring petrol in a car and lighting a cigar, as noted by Richard Horwell QC, for the Metropolitan Commissioner.

The Paget report states that when the car was found, Andanson's body was in the driver's seat of the car, and his head was detached and lay between the front seats. There was a hole in his left temple. The French pathologist concluded this hole was caused by the intense heat of the fire rather than, for example, a bullet wound.

Operation Paget found no evidence Andanson was known to any security service and, contrary to Al-Fayed's claims, his death was thoroughly investigated by French police (although the whereabouts of the car keys has never been explained). A break-in at his former workplace in June 2000 alleged to have been carried out by security services was found to be unconnected to his death, as no items related to him were stolen.

=== Le Van Thanh ===
It has been reported by numerous publications that the white Fiat Uno belonged to Le Van Thanh, a taxi driver who was 22 years old at the time of the crash. Multiple witnesses recall seeing a man matching his description exit the tunnel seconds after the crash. Georges and Sabine Dauzonne identified Thanh as "the agitated man they may have seen driving the car".

Thanh owned a white Fiat Uno identical to the one that struck the Princess of Wales' Mercedes. French investigators had narrowed it down from the original 4,000 registered (along with Andanson's) as having the Bianco Corfu 224 paint scheme and manufactured from 1983 to September 1987. Chemical analysis showed that the original paint was “compatible with the white traces seen on the Mercedes.” Following tests, it was concluded that the car "could have been involved in the accident". He was questioned only once, on 13 November 1997, by French detectives at his apartment in Clichy, north of Paris and has always refused any further interview requests.

Thanh told French investigators that he was on shift at the time of the crash as a night-shift security guard at a Renault factory in Gennevilliers. He said another man was working with him, but he “couldn't recall his name”, which led to him being ruled out as a suspect. Critics of the investigation claim that the French police never verified his alibi. It was later uncovered that he left work early that night and could have been visiting his father's home near the Alma tunnel. When investigators questioned Thanh about his car being re-sprayed red from the original white and having replacement bumpers, he claimed it was done a few hours prior to the crash. He refused to provide a reason for doing so. In 2006, Thanh's father said his son had re-sprayed his Uno red hours after the crash, allegedly waking up his mechanic brother in the night to help him.

== Bright flash ==
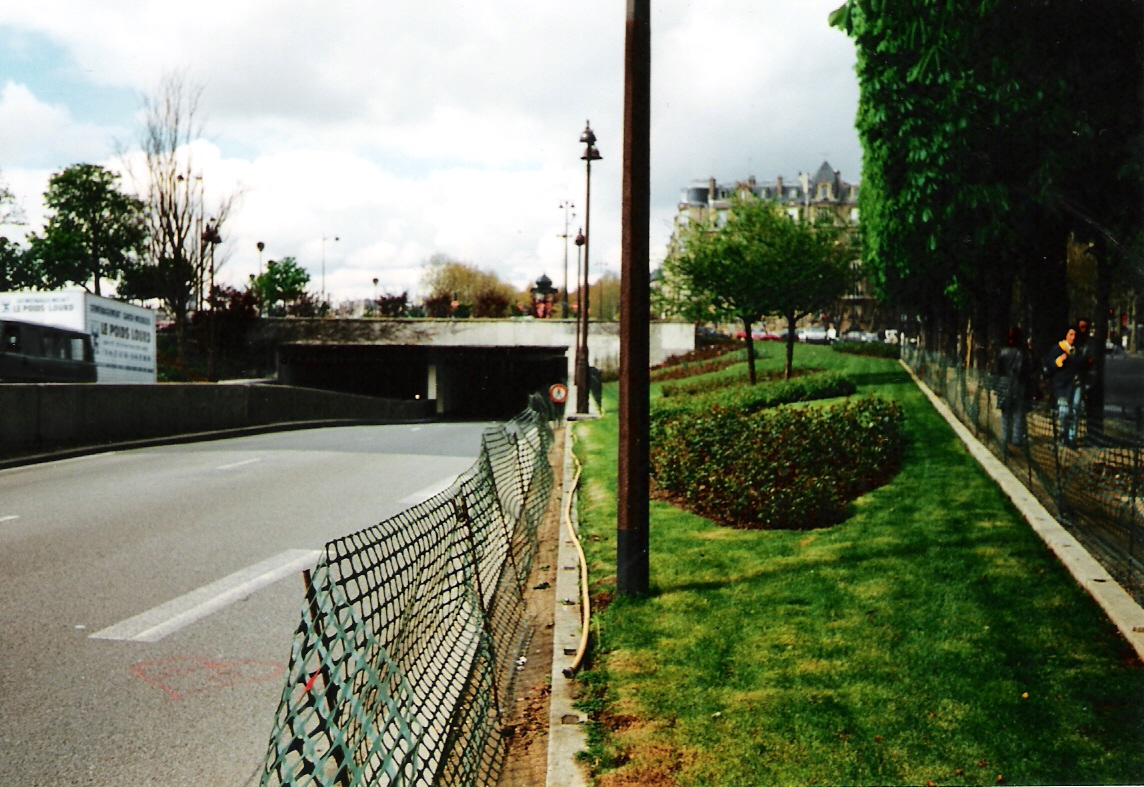
The entrance to the Pont de l'Alma Tunnel (as seen in 1998), the site where Diana was fatally injured

An alternative explanation for the cause of the crash has been reports of a bright white flash just before the car entered the tunnel, blinding the driver. Richard Tomlinson made this allegation at the inquiry, but the veracity of his evidence was found wanting.

It was found by the authorities that three eyewitnesses at the scene of the crash claimed to see a bright flash of light before the crash. François Levistre (originally François Levi) made a clear, specific claim that he saw a bright flash, but his three statements to the authorities were in conflict with each other. Both the French detectives investigating after the crash and later the officers who worked on Operation Paget rejected his evidence. With the Mercedes behind him, he claimed to have seen the flash in his rear-view mirror and recounted other elements of what he saw while he was negotiating the difficult bend out of the tunnel. Crucially, however, his testimony was directly contradicted by his then-wife, who was in the passenger seat next to him. However, eyewitness Brian Anderson, an American tourist, told detectives that he too saw a bright flash.

French Police in 1997 were aware of Levistre's conviction in Rouen during 1989 for dishonesty and his subsequent prison sentence, and he was not thought by them to be a reliable witness. Television documentaries produced by Channel 4 in 2004 and the BBC in 2006 both raised this issue; he appeared as a witness at the British inquiry via a video link in October 2007. Diana: Secrets Behind the Crash (3 June 1998), an ITV programme presented by Nicholas Owen, then ITN's royal correspondent, gave enough weight to the claims of Levistre that 93% of viewers polled by the Mirror newspaper just after the broadcast believed there had been a bright flash of light at the time of the crash.

The detail of eyewitness testimony was thoroughly reviewed and Operation Paget officers succeeded in uncovering two new witnesses. Other eyewitness testimony made little reference to the appearance of any inexplicable flashes at the crash site. Several witnesses who would be expected to have seen a blinding flash made no reference to one. In any event, the detailed crash reconstruction revealed that the chain of events that led to the car unavoidably colliding with the pillar started well before it was at the mouth of the tunnel where the flash is alleged to have occurred. Furthermore, a strobe light of the type that was alleged to have been used is so powerful that a flash emitted from it would have been bright enough to illuminate a very wide area. It would have likely blinded not only Paul, but also the driver of the white Fiat Uno, the pursuing paparazzi and witnesses standing at the road side. The Operation Paget report concluded that the alleged flash did not happen.

== Seat belt ==
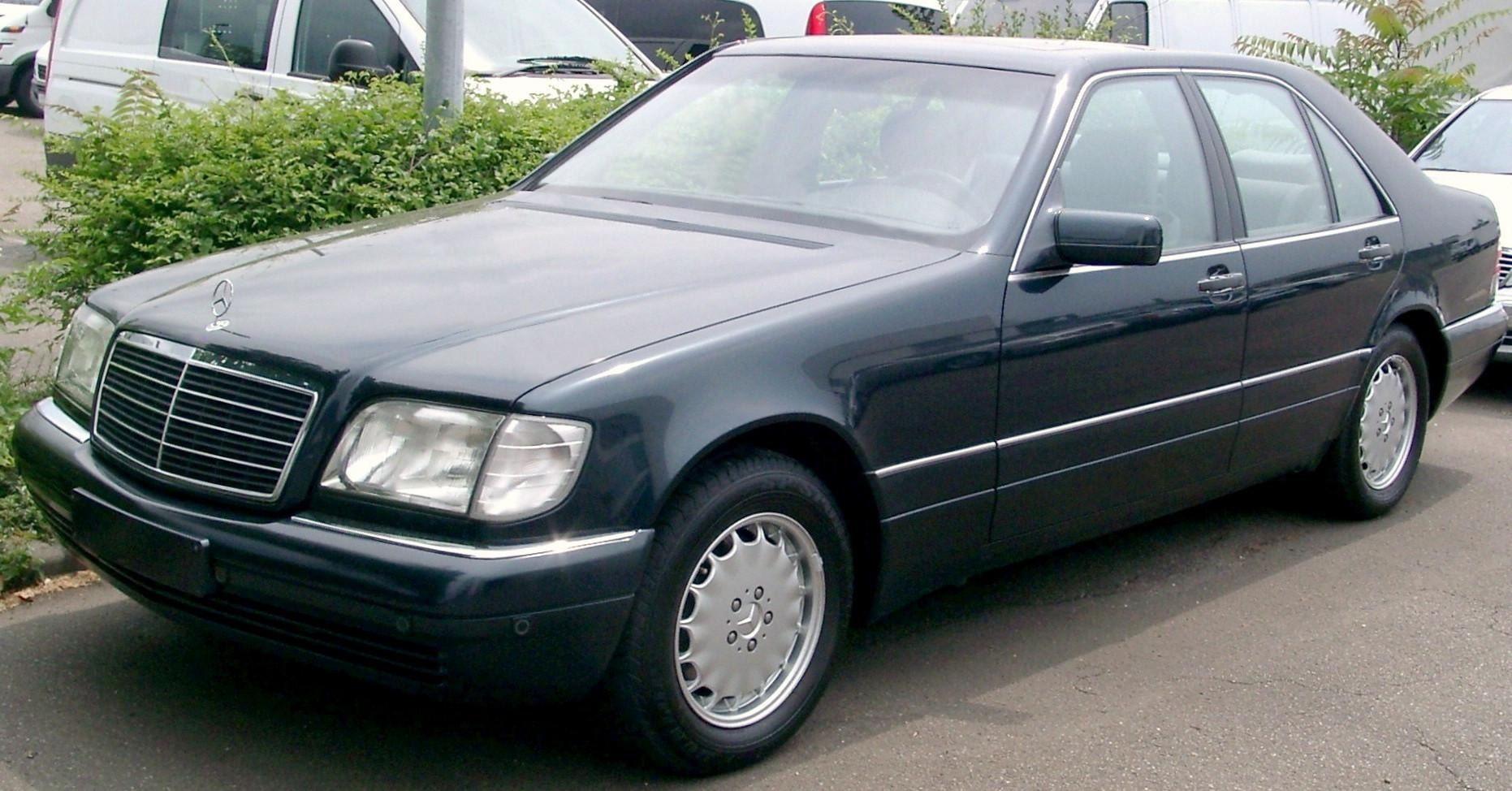
A Mercedes-Benz W140 S-Class, similar to the one involved in the crash

There was some media discussion in April 2006 suggesting that Diana was a faithful seat belt user and therefore the fact that both her and Dodi's seat belts either failed or were not used was sinister and might suggest sabotage. Her sister, Lady Sarah McCorquodale later said that Diana "was religious in putting on her seat belt". Other sources question if she did in fact use her seat belt all the time, as was suggested.

"What is certain is that she was not wearing a seat belt and this made things worse. We would like to think that if she had been wearing a seat belt, we'd have been able to save her," said André Lienhart, who reviewed the emergency services' response for the French government investigation of the incident. CNN did an analysis of the crash in early September 1997 and concluded that injuries would have been minor had the occupants been wearing seat belts. The conclusions were provisional owing to limited data about the specific Mercedes model as the limousine was not sold in the US.

The wreckage of the car was repatriated to England in 2005 by a forensic accident investigator from the Transport Research Laboratory of thirty-five years experience on behalf of Operation Paget; subsequent analysis found that all the seat belts were in good working order except for the right rear one which was attached to the seat Diana occupied. Follow up enquiries with French investigators found that they had declared all the seat belts operational at an examination in October 1997, suggesting the damage to this seat belt took place after the crash.

The British inquest verdict explicitly stated that lack of seat belts had "caused or contributed to" the deaths of both Dodi and Diana.

== Transport to the hospital ==
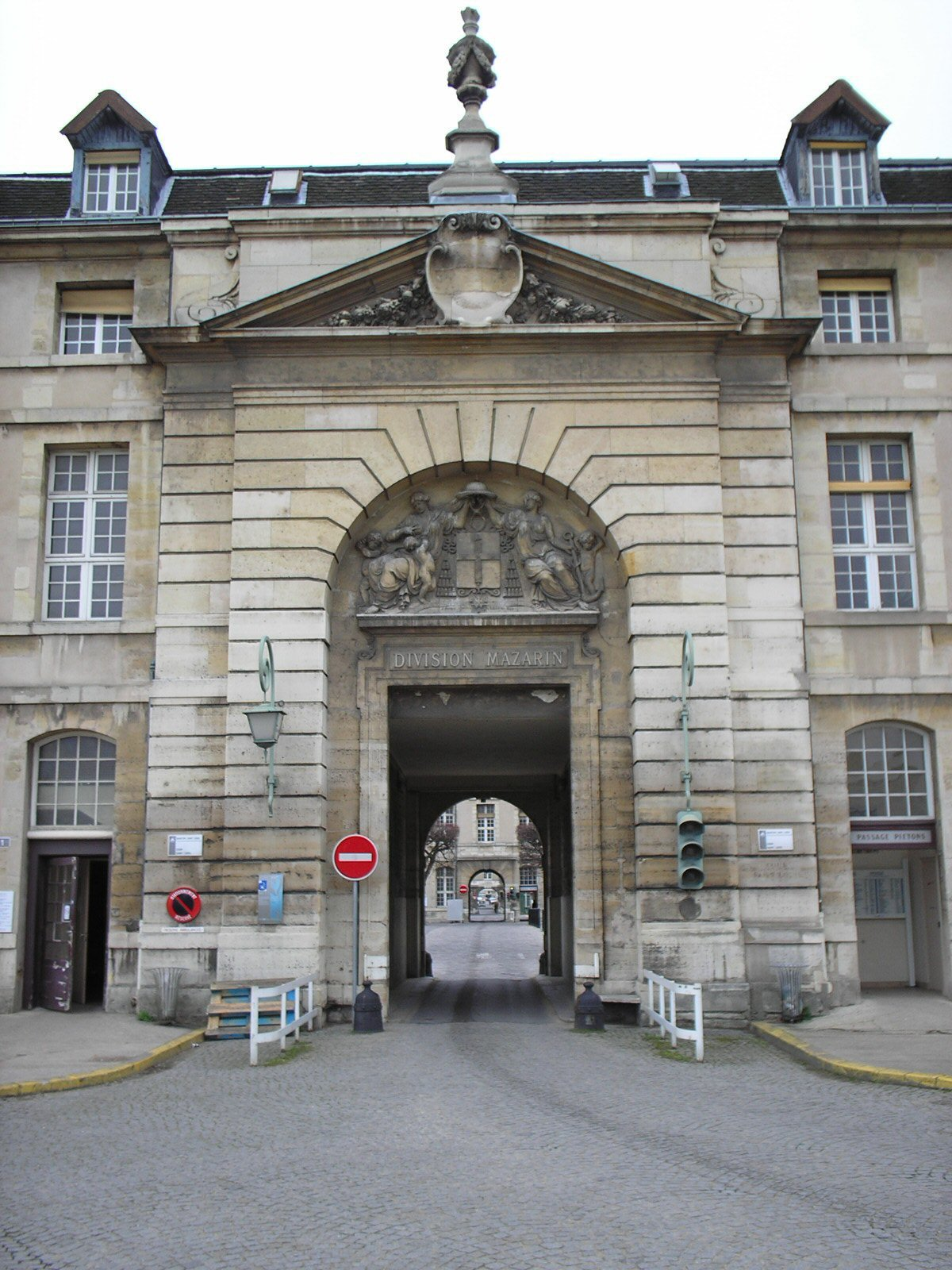
Entrance to Pitié-Salpêtrière Hospital

The first call to the emergency services' switchboard was logged at 12:26 a.m. The SAMU ambulance carrying the Princess arrived at the Pitié-Salpêtrière Hospital at 2:06 a.m. The French system of emergency care adhered to the "stay and play" mantra, which meant that the patient needed to be stabilised first at a fully equipped medical ambulance before being directed to a specialised hospital that could treat his or her injuries, no matter how far away it was. Nevertheless, this length of time has prompted much conspiracy-related comment.

The period between the crash and the arrival at the hospital takes into account the following: the time taken for emergency services to arrive; the time taken by the Sapeurs-Pompiers (fire service) of Paris to remove Diana from the damaged car; and the actual journey time from the crash site to the hospital. Police Officers Sébastien Dorzee and Lino Gagliadorne were the first emergency officials to arrive at the scene at around 12:30 a.m. Sergeants Xavier Gourmelom and Philippe Boyer of the Sapeurs-Pompiers arrived at around 12:32 a.m. Jean-Marc Martino, a specialist in anaesthetics and intensive care treatment and the doctor in charge of the SAMU ambulance, arrived at around 12:40 a.m. Diana was removed from the car at 1:00 a.m. She then went into cardiac arrest. Following external cardiopulmonary resuscitation, her heart started beating again. She was moved to the SAMU ambulance at 1:18 a.m.

The ambulance departed from the crash scene at 1:41 a.m. and arrived at the hospital at 2:06 a.m.—a journey time of approximately 26 minutes. This included a stop at the Gare d'Austerlitz ordered by Martino because of the drop in the blood pressure of the Princess of Wales and the necessity of dealing with it. The ambulance was travelling slowly on his express instructions. The doctor was concerned about Diana's blood pressure and the effects on her medical condition of deceleration and acceleration.

The SAMU ambulance carrying Diana passed the Hôtel-Dieu Hospital on the Ile de la Cité en route to the Pitié-Salpêtrière Hospital. The decision to transfer her to the Pitié-Salpêtrière Hospital was taken by Marc Lejay who was on despatch duty in SAMU Control on that night, in consultation with Dr Derossi, who was at the scene. The Pitié-Salpêtrière Hospital was the main reception centre for multiple trauma patients in Paris. The Hôtel-Dieu was not equipped to deal with the injuries Diana had sustained. Lejay stated: "The Hôtel-Dieu hospital on the 'Ile de la Cité' is closer but not equipped with heart surgery teams or neurosurgical teams or teams trained to take patients with multiple injuries." Lejay was also aware that Bruno Riou was on duty at the Pitié-Salpêtrière that night and was particularly skilled to treat her injuries. Martino supported this view.

== Embalming of the body ==
Mohamed Al-Fayed alleged that Diana's body was deliberately embalmed shortly after her death to ensure that any pregnancy test at the post-mortem would produce a false result. Robert Chapman, who carried out the post-mortem examination, stated that the embalming fluids would have had no effect on determining whether Diana was pregnant or not as the physical evidence would have been present in her womb and ovaries.

Operation Paget found that 31 August 1997 was a very hot day in Paris. Diana's body had been stored in an empty room adjacent to the emergency room where she had been treated at the Pitié-Salpêtrière Hospital, as the mortuary was on the other side of the hospital grounds and some distance away. Dry ice and air conditioning units were placed in the room to keep it cool but appeared to have had little success.

Diana's two sisters and Prince Charles were scheduled to view the body later that afternoon before bringing it back to the United Kingdom. President Jacques Chirac and his wife also wished to pay their respects. This meant there was very little time to prepare the body for viewing, and it was deemed unacceptable to present Diana's body to her family and the President of France in the state it was in. Faced with this situation, the hospital staff decided to press ahead with embalming with only verbal authority from Martine Monteil, the local superintendent of police, who assured Jean Monceau "that everything would be in order". Under French law, paperwork must be completed before undertaking the embalming of any corpse likely to be subject to a post-mortem. This paperwork was completed, but only after the embalming had been carried out, giving rise to allegations of suspicious circumstances. The allegations were made despite there being no way the hospital staff could have known whether or not Diana was pregnant, as a pregnancy test would have been irrelevant to her post crash treatment and accordingly was not carried out.

== SAS ==
The Court Martial of SAS Sniper Danny Nightingale led to a letter written by witness, Soldier N, and sent to his in-laws coming to wider attention. Soldier N, Nightingale's former roommate, was in prison for illegally hiding firearms and ammunition. On 17 August 2013, the Metropolitan Police announced they were reviewing evidence that Soldier N had boasted that the SAS were behind the death of Princess Diana. The parents of Soldier N's estranged wife reportedly wrote to the SAS's commanding officer, claiming Soldier N had told his wife the unit "arranged" Diana's death and it was "covered up". The information was reportedly passed onto Scotland Yard by the Royal Military Police. However, Scotland Yard stressed that this information would not lead to a re-investigation and that they were examining its "relevance and credibility". They also confirmed that Prince Charles and Mohamed Al-Fayed were being kept informed as preliminary examination progressed. At the end of November 2013, Scotland Yard ended its study of the SAS allegations and released a statement: "The Metropolitan Police Service has scoped the information and is in the process of drawing up conclusions, which will be communicated to the families and interested parties first, before any further comment can be made," On 16 December, it emerged from Sky News reports that there was "no credible evidence" that the SAS was involved in the death of the Princess and the others, and thus no reason to re-open the investigation.

== Popular culture ==
- The Murder of Princess Diana is a 2004 book by British journalist Noel Botham which disputes the official version of events and suggests an orchestrated conspiracy. A fictionalised telemovie adaption, The Murder of Princess Diana was later released.
- Unlawful Killing, a British documentary film about the deaths of Diana and Dodi, was shown May 2011 in Cannes, while the 2011 Cannes Film Festival was in progress. It was directed by Keith Allen and funded by Mohamed Al-Fayed. The film was not shown in British cinemas; lawyers for the producers suggested that 87 cuts needed to be made before it could be certified for release. Following its failure to gain insurance against possible legal action, following putative distribution in the United States, the film was shelved in 2012.
- In That Mitchell and Webb Look, a series of sketches depicting a group of three government agents discussing plans to carry out popular conspiracy theories, whilst inadvertently pointing out the flaws in such plans, includes one revolving around Diana's death. The sketch ends with plan "happen[ing] by accident".
- Investigating Diana: Death in Paris is a four-part documentary series broadcast on Channel 4 in 2022, which presents an in-depth exploration of the conspiracy theories surrounding the death of Princess Diana. It features interviews with Martine Monteil and the French detectives from La Brigade Criminelle who first investigated the death of Princess Diana, key witnesses from the tunnel including Sabine Dauzonne and Frederic Maillet, as well as Lord Stevens and the British detectives from Operation Paget speaking on the record for the first time. The series was directed by Will Jessop and Barnaby Peel and produced by Sandpaper Films.

== See also ==
- Innocent Victims
- Operation Paget
- List of conspiracy theories
