= Michael Burgess (coroner) =

British coroner (b. 1946)

Michael John Clement Burgess, CVO, OBE (born 31 March 1946) was the Coroner of the Queen's Household. He was educated at Beaumont College and King's College London. He was appointed deputy coroner in 1991 and was appointed coroner in 2002.

He was in charge of the inquest into the deaths of Diana, Princess of Wales, and Dodi Fayed until July 2006. He then announced that he wished to stand down from the case due to a "heavy and constant" workload.

He has been the Surrey coroner since 1986.

He was appointed Commander of the Royal Victorian Order (CVO) in the 2016 Birthday Honours.
