= Deborah Lynn Steinberg =

British sociologist

Deborah Lynn Steinberg (7 October 1961 – 6 February 2017) was a British-based American academic, author, educator and sociologist. She was a professor of Gender, Culture and Media Studies in the Department of Sociology at the University of Warwick.

Steinberg was born and brought up in Los Angeles, the daughter of Irwin Steinberg, a radiologist, and his wife, Maxine (née Beckerman) Steinberg, a lawyer. She had a BA in Women's Studies from the University of California, Berkeley; an MA from the University of Kent, and a PhD from the University of Birmingham.

She was diagnosed with breast cancer in 2007, but was given the all clear in 2013. However, the disease returned the following year. She continued to work until incapacitated by the disease, and died in 2017, aged 55.

== Books ==
- Steinberg, Deborah Lynn; Spallone, Patricia (1987). Made to order: the myth of reproductive and genetic progress. Oxford Oxfordshire New York: Pergamon Press. ISBN 9780807762264.
- Steinberg, Deborah Lynn; Klein, Renate (1989). Radical voices: a decade of feminist resistance from women's studies international forum. Oxford England New York: Pergamon Press. ISBN 9780080364834.
- Steinberg, Deborah Lynn (1997). Bodies in glass: genetics, eugenics, embryo ethics. Manchester New York New York: Manchester University Press Distributed exclusively in the USA by St. Martin's Press. ISBN 9780719046681.
- Steinberg, Deborah Lynn; Epstein, Debbie; Johnson, Richard (1997). Border patrols: policing the boundaries of heterosexuality. London Herndon, Virginia: Cassell. ISBN 9780304334797.
- Steinberg, Deborah Lynn; Kear, Adrian (2002). Mourning Diana: nation, culture and the performance of grief. London New York: Routledge. ISBN 9780203260432.
- Steinberg, Deborah Lynn; Johnson, Richard (2004). Blairism and the war of persuasion: Labour's passive revolution. London: Lawrence & Wishart. ISBN 9780853159926.
- Steinberg, Deborah Lynn (2015). Genes and the Bioimaginary: Science, Spectacle, Culture. London: Routledge. ISBN 9781409462552.
