= Operation Paget =

2004–06 British police inquiry into Diana's death

Operation Paget was the British Metropolitan Police inquiry established in 2004 to investigate the conspiracy theories about the death of Diana, Princess of Wales, in a car crash in Paris in 1997. The inquiry's first report with the findings of the criminal investigation was published in 2006. The inquiry was wound up following the conclusion of the British inquest in 2008, in which a jury delivered its verdict of an "unlawful killing" due to the "gross negligence" of both the driver of Diana's car and the pursuing paparazzi.

== Background ==
The criminal investigation in the United Kingdom was initiated on 6 January 2004 when the coroner of the Queen's Household, Michael Burgess, asked the then Metropolitan Police commissioner, Sir John Stevens, to conduct enquiries into allegations of a cover-up and conspiracy: that MI6, under the orders of the royal family, deliberately caused the fatal car crash in Paris that killed Diana and Dodi Fayed.

The investigation was legally necessary; once the inquest into the deaths got under way in the United Kingdom, it became apparent to the coroner that allegations were being made that a crime had taken place on UK soil: namely, conspiracy to murder. Coroners are legally obliged to refer to the police any information or evidence that comes before them concerning a suspected or actual crime. The basis of the investigation was public statements made mainly by Dodi Fayed's father, Mohamed Al-Fayed.

The investigation initially was confined to the general premise of the alleged conspiracy, but was eventually broadened to cover every associated allegation made through the media, in legal submissions, and in formal correspondence since the crash. The level of detail of the investigation is reflected in the report's length at 832 pages which took a team of fourteen experienced police officers nearly three years to compile. Accident Investigation experts from TRL assisted the police enquiry.

The British police also carried out investigations in Paris. Because of public interest in Diana, the Metropolitan Police decided to publish the report on the internet, although it had been drafted as an internal police document. The criminal investigation was expected to cost at least £2 million. The cost of the inquiry eventually exceeded £12.5 million, with the coroner's inquest at £4.5 million, and a further £8 million spent on the Metropolitan Police investigation.

== Criminal investigation report ==
The criminal investigation report's chapter titles are:

Introduction
Chapter One – Relationship / Engagement / Pregnancy (Alleged motives for the conspiracy)
Chapter Two – Perceived Threats to Diana, Princess of Wales
Chapter Three – Actions of the Paparazzi in Paris
Chapter Four – Henri Paul – Hôtel Ritz Paris Security Officer and driver of the Mercedes
Chapter Five – CCTV / (traffic cameras) in Paris
Chapter Six – Mercedes Car
Chapter Seven – Blocking Vehicles / Unidentified Vehicles / Bright Flashes (The Journey to the Alma Underpass)
Chapter Eight – Post-Crash Medical Treatment of Diana
Chapter Nine – The Embalming of the Body of the Princess of Wales at the Pitié-Salpêtrière Hospital
Chapter Ten – Actions of the French Authorities
Chapter Eleven – Actions of the Foreign & Commonwealth Office / British Embassy, Paris
Chapter Twelve – British Authorities Actions with regard to 'Suspicious Deaths'
Chapter Thirteen – Bodyguards of Mohamed Al-Fayed (Trevor Rees-Jones, Kieran Wingfield and Reuben Murrell)
Chapter Fourteen – 'James' Andanson – French Photo-journalist and owner of a White Fiat Uno
Chapter Fifteen – Central Intelligence Agency / National Security Agency, USA
Chapter Sixteen – The Secret Intelligence Service (MI6) and the Security Service (MI5)

== Conclusion of criminal investigation report ==
Each chapter of the report concluded that all allegations made since the crash of conspiracy were without foundation and all the evidence obtained point to the deaths of Diana and Fayed as being the result of an accident. The script for the 2007 television docudrama Diana: Last Days of a Princess borrowed heavily from testimony in the Paget report.

Angela Gallop's analysis of Diana's stomach contents proved to Operation Paget that Diana was not pregnant when she died.

== Later developments ==
On 3 April 2007, the deputy coroner of the Queen's Household, Baroness Butler-Sloss, decided to grant access to the evidence collected by the criminal investigation to lawyers for Mohammed Al-Fayed to assist them in putting together their case in support of the conspiracy allegation for the inquest to begin in October 2007. On 15 May 2007, it was revealed by Baroness Butler-Sloss that the underlying material collected by the criminal investigation team ran to more than 11,000 pages when printed out and also consisted of more than 1,400 photographs, several DVDs, large-sized plans and other data. The material was substantially disclosed to the interested persons and legal teams.

== Coroner's inquest ==
The coroner's inquest opened on 2 October 2007, headed by Lord Justice Scott Baker. The opening statement mostly consisted of evidence and findings in the criminal investigation report. On 7 April 2008, the jury came to the verdict that Diana and Fayed were unlawfully killed as a result of "gross negligence" of the driver Henri Paul and the paparazzi. Contributing factors cited included "the impairment of the judgment of the driver of the Mercedes Henri Paul through alcohol" and that "the deceased was not wearing a seatbelt".
