= John Stevens, Baron Stevens of Kirkwhelpington =

British police officer (born 1942)

The Right Honourable The Lord Stevens of Kirkwhelpington KStJ QPM DL FRSA

Commissioner of Police of the Metropolis
- In office 1 January 2000 – 28 January 2005
- Monarch: Elizabeth II
- Prime Minister: Tony Blair
- Deputy: Sir Ian Blair
- Preceded by: Sir Paul Condon
- Succeeded by: Sir Ian Blair

Member of the House of Lords
- Lord Temporal
- Life peerage 6 April 2005

Personal details
- Born: John Arthur Stevens; 21 October 1942 (age 84)
- Education: University of Leicester; University of Southampton
- Profession: Police officer; head of the Metropolitan Police Service (2000–2005)

John Arthur Stevens, Baron Stevens of Kirkwhelpington, KStJ, QPM, DL, FRSA (born 21 October 1942) is a former Commissioner of Police of the Metropolis (head of the Metropolitan Police Service), having served from 2000 until 2005. From 1991 to 1996, he was Chief Constable of Northumbria Police before being appointed one of HM Inspectors of Constabulary in September 1996. He was then appointed Deputy Commissioner of the Met in 1998 until his promotion to Commissioner in 2000. He was a writer for the News of the World, for £7,000 an article, until his resignation as the hacking scandal progressed.

He sits in the House of Lords as a crossbencher.

== Police career ==
Stevens was educated at St. Lawrence College, Ramsgate, the University of Leicester, where he took an LLB degree, and the University of Southampton, where he did his MPhil degree. Before becoming Chief Constable of Northumbria, he served as Assistant Chief Constable of the Hampshire Constabulary (1986–88) and Deputy Chief Constable of the Cambridgeshire Constabulary (1988–91).

He presided over an external police inquiry into allegations in Northern Ireland of collusion between the British security services and loyalist paramilitaries in a series of killings during the Troubles. Stevens's third report, published on 17 April 2003, upheld the claim and explicitly said that collusion leading to the murder of Catholics (and some Protestant wrongly thought to be Catholic or nationalist) had taken place. In the aftermath of the report, David Trimble, then-leader of the Ulster Unionist Party, called for a parliamentary inquiry into the collusion, while the leaders of the SDLP and Sinn Féin called for a full public inquiry. A subsequent government ordered review by Sir Desmond de Silva, QC, announced in December 2012, confirmed the findings of the Stevens 1, 2 and 3 Inquiries regarding collusion between British security forces and loyalist paramilitary groups in killings in Northern Ireland, which resulted in 97 convictions, and a large number of recommendations, which were accepted.

== Post-retirement ==
After his retirement as Commissioner of Police of the Metropolis, on 6 April 2005 he was created a life peer as Baron Stevens of Kirkwhelpington, of Kirkwhelpington in the County of Northumberland. He headed a Metropolitan Police inquiry, Operation Paget, into the death of Diana, Princess of Wales, on 31 August 1997, which reported its findings in 2006.

Lord Stevens of Kirkwhelpington was asked by the Conservatives, under David Cameron, to be their candidate for the London Mayoral elections. He declined this offer.

On 29 June 2007, having become one of the UK's leading security experts, in-coming Prime Minister Gordon Brown appointed Lord Stevens of Kirkwhelpington as his Senior Advisor on International Security Issues. David Cameron appointed Stevens as Chair of the Borders Policing Committee in 2007, a position he held for 9 months focusing on the reorganisation and policing of the UK's borders. In 2011, he was appointed by Yvette Cooper MP, Shadow Secretary of State for Home Affairs to Chair an Independent Commission Policing Commission into the Future of Policing in England and Wales.

The Commission, which reported its findings in Spring 2013, was set up in place of a Royal Commission and is made up of nearly 40 members all of whom are experts in the fields of academia, politics, national and international policing/security as well as key figures from community initiatives and business. In addition the Commission has secured contributions from 35 academics from 25 Universities from around the world including, Oxford University, Cambridge University, Northumbria University and Harvard University.

Lord Stevens of Kirkwhelpington became Honorary President of the Police Credit Union in 2007.

He is also Patron of the Police History Society.

Lord Stevens of Kirkwhelpington holds positions at a number of security consultancy companies. Since 2014, he has been Chairman of the boutique investigative and security consulting firm Quest Global Limited (QGL), where he is also a person with significant control. In 2020, Lord Stevens of Kirkwhelpington was forced to apologise when he was "found in breach of the House of Lords' code of conduct for failing to correctly declare his work for foreign governments" in connection with his position at QGL and his other consultancy work. QGL was also mentioned in connection with the alleged bugging of Sir Frederick Barclay at the London Ritz in 2020 and the subsequent legal action brought by Sir Frederick and his daughter against other members of their family.

== Honours ==
Awarded the Queen's Police Medal in the 1992 New Year Honours, he was knighted in the 2000 New Year Honours and made Deputy Lieutenant of London in 2001. In 2002, he was made a Knight of the Order of St John.

Ribbon	Description	Notes
	Knight Bachelor	2000
	Order of St John (KStJ)	Knight; 2002
	Queen's Police Medal (QPM)	1992
	Queen Elizabeth II Golden Jubilee Medal	2002; UK version of this medal
	Queen Elizabeth II Diamond Jubilee Medal	2012; UK version of this medal
	Police Long Service and Good Conduct Medal	

In April 2007, Lord Stevens of Kirkwhelpington became Honorary Air Commodore of No 3 (Royal Auxiliary) Air Force Police Squadron. He is the Honorary Colonel of Northumbria Army Cadet Force. On 28 November 2005, he was appointed Chancellor of Northumbria University.

He is a Fellow of Wolfson College, Cambridge, and was a visiting professor at City University of New York (CUNY).

Lord Stevens of Kirkwhelpington holds a Commercial Pilot's Licence and is part owner of several aircraft.

== Styles and honours ==
- Mr John Stevens (1942–1963)
- PC John Stevens (1963, through all intermediate ranks to Detective Chief Superintendent 1986)
- Assistant Chief Constable John Stevens (1986–1989)
- Deputy Chief Constable John Stevens (1989–1991)
- Chief Constable John Stevens (1991–1991)
- Chief Constable John Stevens QPM (1991–1998)
- Deputy Commissioner John Stevens QPM (1998–2000)
- Commissioner John Stevens QPM (2000)
- Commissioner Sir John Stevens QPM (2000–2001)
- Commissioner Sir John Stevens QPM DL (2001–2002)
- Commissioner Sir John Stevens KStJ QPM DL (2002–2005)
- The Lord Stevens of Kirkwhelpington KStJ QPM DL FRSA (2005–present)

== Arms ==
Coat of arms of John Stevens, Baron Stevens of Kirkwhelpington

Adopted
2006
Coronet
Coronet of a Baron
Crest
A Heron wings elevated and addorsed Sable beaked legged and holding in the dexter foot a Truncheon Or
Escutcheon
Per fess Or and Gules two Pallets counterchanged in the Or issuing in chief a Broad Arrow Sable
Supporters
On either side a Labrador that on the dexter Sable gorged with a Collar and holding in the interior forepaw a Saxon Cross Or that on the sinister Or gorged with a plain Collar and holding in the interior forepaw a Saxon Cross Sable
Motto
PRO TANTO QUID RETRISUAMUS
Badge
In front of a Swallow volant bendwise head downwards Gules a Swallow volant bendwise sinister head downwards Or
Symbolism
The Arms are variation on the red and gold pallets in the Arms of Northumberland with black arrow formations to suggest the lower portion of a portcullis and hence the Police Force, in which Lord Stevens of Kirkwhelpington was Metropolitan Police Commissioner. The Heron with its truncheon is a watchful bird and the labradors with Saxon crosses are a pun on Kirkwhelpington. The cross represents the kirk or church and the dog is a whelp

== Autobiography ==
- Stevens, John (2005). Not for the Faint-Hearted: My Life Fighting Crime. London: Weidenfeld & Nicolson. ISBN 978-0-297-84842-4.

== See also ==
- Phone hacking scandal reference lists
- Metropolitan police role in phone hacking scandal

Police appointments
Preceded by Sir Paul Condon	Commissioner of Police of the Metropolis; 2000–2005	Succeeded by Sir Ian Blair
Academic offices
Preceded by The Lord Glenamara	Chancellor of Northumbria University; 2005–present	Incumbent
Orders of precedence in the United Kingdom
Preceded by The Lord Kinnock	Gentlemen; Baron Stevens of Kirkwhelpington	Followed by The Lord Adonis
