= List of TV Guide covers (2010s) =

This is a list of issue covers of TV Guide magazine from the decade of the 2010s, from January 2010 to December 2019. This list reflects only the regular weekly or bi-weekly issues of TV Guide (no one-time-only issues), and includes covers that are national or regional in nature, along with any covers that were available exclusively to print or digital subscribers. The entries on this table include each cover's subjects and their artists (photographer or illustrator).

- Dates for two-week "double issues" of the print edition are indicated in **bold italics**, with listings covering that week and the following week.
- Since 2012, TV Guide added a digital edition for subscribers on platforms such as Zinio; these issues, which are downloaded when the printed version's double issues are on their second week, are indicated with dates in italics and with a (D).

== 2010 ==
Issue date	Cover subject	Cover type	Artist
**January 4**	2010 "Winter Preview," featuring Josh Holloway of Lost	Photograph	Don Flood
January 18	Kiefer Sutherland of 24	Photograph	Brian Bowen Smith
January 25	"Sweeps Preview" (2 covers): *Michael Weatherly and Cote de Pablo of NCIS; *Ian Somerhalder, Paul Wesley, and Nina Dobrev of The Vampire Diaries	Photograph	*NCIS: Brian Bowen Smith; *Vampire: Adam Olszewski
February 1	Ellen Pompeo of Grey's Anatomy	Photograph	
February 8	Julianna Margulies of The Good Wife	Photograph	
**February 15**	"Olympics Preview," featuring Apolo Anton Ohno, Rachael Flatt, and Lindsey Vonn	Photo montage	Ohno: Trae Patton/AP Images; Flatt: Matthew Stockman/Getty Images; Vonn: Erich Spiess/Red Bull Photofiles
March 1	"Spring Preview!"	Photo montage	
March 8	Ellen DeGeneres of American Idol	Photograph	
March 15	Josh Holloway, Yunjin Kim, Matthew Fox, and Naveen Andrews of Lost	Photo montage	Mario Perez/ABC
**March 22**	*"TV's Top 50 Families of All Time!" (newsstand cover); *The cast of Modern Family (subscriber cover)	Top 50: photo montage; Modern: photograph	Modern: Joseph Cultice
April 5	"Sci-Fi Preview"	Photo montage	
April 12	Hugh Laurie of House	Photograph	
April 19	Matthew Morrison, Lea Michele, Dianna Agron, Amber Riley, Jane Lynch, and Jenna Ushkowitz of Glee	Photograph	Art Streiber
April 26	Michael Weatherly, Sean Murray, and Mark Harmon of NCIS	Photograph	Brian Bowen Smith
May 3	Simon Cowell of American Idol	Photograph	Joe Pugliese/Corbis Outline
May 10	Simon Baker of The Mentalist	Photograph	Jack Guy/Corbis Outline
May 17	Dancing with the Stars couples Nicole Scherzinger & Derek Hough and Anna Trebunskaya & Evan Lysacek	Photograph	
**May 24**	A salute to Lost	Photo Art	Photos: ABC; art: Joe Zeff Designs
**June 7**	"Summer Preview," featuring Larry David of Curb Your Enthusiasm	Photograph	
**June 21**	Mark Feuerstein of Royal Pains, Jeffrey Donovan of Burn Notice, and Matt Bomer of White Collar	Photograph	Justin Stephens
**July 5**	Kyra Sedgwick of The Closer (TV Guide's 3,000th issue)	Photograph	
**July 19**	Jon Hamm and January Jones of Mad Men	Photograph	
**August 2**	True Blood (2 covers): *Anna Paquin with Stephen Moyer; *Paquin with Alexander Skarsgård	Photograph	
**August 16**	Grace Park, Daniel Dae Kim, Scott Caan, and Alex O'Loughlin of Hawaii Five-0	Photograph	Patrick Hoelck
**August 30**	Oprah Winfrey with Dr. Mehmet Oz, Nate Berkus, and Dr. Phil McGraw	Photograph	
September 13	Fall Preview	Photo montage	
September 20	"Returning Favorites" issue, featuring Johnny Galecki, Kaley Cuoco, and Jim Parsons of The Big Bang Theory	Photograph	
September 27	Patrick Dempsey and Ellen Pompeo of Grey's Anatomy	Photograph	
October 4	Lisa Edelstein and Hugh Laurie of House	Photograph	
October 11	Michael C. Hall of Dexter	Photograph	
October 18	Steve Buscemi, Michael Pitt, and Gretchen Mol of Boardwalk Empire	Photograph	
October 25	Ian Somerhalder, Nina Dobrev, and Paul Wesley of The Vampire Diaries	Photograph	
November 1	Josh Charles, Julianna Margulies, and Chris Noth of The Good Wife	Photograph	
November 8	Pauley Perrette, Mark Harmon, and Cote de Pablo of NCIS	Photograph	
November 15	"2010 Hot List," featuring cast members from Glee on 5 covers	Photograph	Adam Olszewski
**November 22**	"Sci-Fi Preview," featuring Joshua Jackson, Anna Torv, and John Noble of Fringe	Photograph	
December 6	Padma Lakshmi and Tom Colicchio of Top Chef	Photograph	
December 13	Jared Padalecki and Jensen Ackles of Supernatural, selected for the cover through a "Fan Favorites" vote of TV Guide readers	Photograph	Jordan Nuttal/The CW
**December 20**	"2010's Cheers & Jeers," featuring the cast of Modern Family (3 covers): *Jesse Tyler Ferguson, Eric Stonestreet with baby *Ed O'Neill, Rico Rodriguez, Sofia Vergara; *Julie Bowen, Ty Burrell, Sarah Hyland, Ariel Winter, Nolan Gould	Photograph	Adam Olszewski

== 2011 ==
Issue date	Cover subject	Cover type	Artist
January 3	2011 "Winter Preview"	Photo montage	
January 10	"God on TV"	Photo montage	
January 17	Ryan Seacrest, Jennifer Lopez, Steven Tyler, and Randy Jackson of American Idol	Photograph	Tony Duran/Fox
**January 24**	"Super Bowl Preview"	Photo montage	
February 7	Tom Selleck of Blue Bloods	Photograph	
**February 14**	Rob Mariano and Russell Hantz of Survivor: Redemption Island	Photograph	
February 28	Stana Katic and Nathan Fillion of Castle	Photograph	Brian Bowen Smith
March 7	*"Spring Preview" (subscriber cover) *"The War over Two and a Half Men," featuring Charlie Sheen (newsstand cover)	*Preview: photo montage *Sheen: photograph	
March 14	Kirstie Alley of Dancing with the Stars	Photograph	
**March 21**	LL Cool J and Chris O'Donnell of NCIS: Los Angeles	Photograph	
April 4	"The 7 Shows You Must Watch"	Photo montage	
April 11	Tom Welling and Erica Durance of Smallville	Photograph	
**April 18**	"Fan Favorites" poll results	Photo montage	
May 2	Mark Harmon and Michael Weatherly of NCIS	Photograph	Kevin Lynch
May 9	A pictorial recap of the wedding of Prince William and Catherine Middleton	Photograph	Tom Hevesi/AP Images
May 16	Simon Baker of The Mentalist	Photograph	
May 23	Oprah Winfrey of The Oprah Winfrey Show	Photograph	Ruvén Afanador/Harpo Productions
May 30	Cee Lo Green, Christina Aguilera, Adam Levine, and Blake Shelton of The Voice	Photo montage	
**June 6**	"Summer Preview," featuring Piper Perabo of Covert Affairs and Matt Bomer of White Collar	Photograph	
**June 20**	Lucy Hale, Troian Bellisario, Shay Mitchell, and Ashley Benson of Pretty Little Liars	Photograph	
July 4	Noah Wyle of Falling Skies	Photograph	
July 11	Sasha Alexander and Angie Harmon of Rizzoli and Isles	Photograph	
**July 18**	Alexander Skarsgård, Joe Manganiello, and Stephen Moyer of True Blood	Photograph	Rodolfo Martinez
**August 1**	"Reality Preview"	Photo montage	
**August 15**	"TV's Highest Paid Stars"	Photo montage	
**August 29**	Jason O'Mara of Terra Nova	Photograph	
September 12	"Fall Preview," featuring Angus T. Jones, Ashton Kutcher, and Jon Cryer of Two and a Half Men	Photograph	
September 19	Simon Cowell of The X Factor	Photograph	
September 26	Rachel Taylor, Annie Ilonzeh and Minka Kelly of Charlie's Angels, recreating the original series' cover photo from September 25, 1976 (that cover, which featured Kate Jackson, Jaclyn Smith and Farrah Fawcett, is displayed here in an inset)	Photograph	2011 Angels: Adam Olszewski; 1976 Angels: TV Guide archives
October 3	"Fall Cable Preview"	Photo montage	
October 10	Marg Helgenberger and Ted Danson of CSI: Crime Scene Investigation	Photograph	
October 17	Zooey Deschanel of New Girl	Photograph	
**October 24**	"Halloween Preview," featuring characters from The Simpsons	Illustration	
November 7	Julianna Margulies and Josh Charles of The Good Wife	Photograph	
November 14	"Hot List 2011," highlighting "Funny Girls" (3 covers); *Christina Applegate of Up All Night; *Kat Dennings and Beth Behrs of 2 Broke Girls; *Zooey Deschanel of New Girl	Photograph	Adam Olszewski
**November 21**	Tim Allen of Last Man Standing	Photograph	
**December 5**	The cast of Community, selected for the cover through a "Fan Favorites" vote of TV Guide readers (3 covers); *Joel McHale with Alison Brie, Yvette Nicole Brown and Gillian Jacobs; *McHale with Donald Glover, and Danny Pudi; *McHale with Ken Jeong, Chevy Chase, and Jim Rash	Photograph	Justin Stevens
**December 19**	Jon Cryer of Two and a Half Men, Melissa McCarthy of Mike & Molly, and Jim Parsons of The Big Bang Theory with series' producer Chuck Lorre	Photograph	Art Streiber

== 2012 ==
Issue date	Cover subject	Cover type	Artist
January 2	2012 "Winter Preview"	Photo montage	
January 9	Ryan Seacrest, Jennifer Lopez, Steven Tyler, and Randy Jackson of American Idol	Photograph	Warwick Saint/Fox
January 16	Naya Rivera, Lea Michele, Chris Colfer, and Darren Criss of Glee	Photograph	
**January 23**	The 200th episode of NCIS (3 covers); *Mark Harmon and Rocky Carroll; *Michael Weatherly, Cote de Pablo, and Sean Murray; *Brian Dietzen, Pauley Perrette, and David McCallum	Photograph	Kevin Lynch
**February 6**	*Dan Stevens and Michelle Dockery of Downton Abbey (newsstand cover); *Katharine McPhee, Jack Davenport, and Debra Messing of Smash (subscriber cover)	Photograph	*Downton: Carnival Film & Television for Masterpiece; *Smash: Justin Stephens
**February 20**	Emily VanCamp, Joshua Bowman, and Madeline Stowe of Revenge	Photograph	Adam Olszewski
March 5	Kiefer Sutherland of Touch	Photograph	
March 12	Ginnifer Goodwin, Jennifer Morrison, and Josh Dallas of Once Upon a Time	Photograph	
**March 19**	Christina Hendricks, Jon Hamm, John Slattery, and Elisabeth Moss of Mad Men	Photo illustration	
April 2	Nikolaj Coster-Waldau, Peter Dinklage, and Kit Harington of Game of Thrones	Photograph	
April 8	David Boreanaz and Emily Deschanel of Bones	Photograph	
**April 16**	"Fan Favorites" poll results, featuring John Noble, Anna Torv and Joshua Jackson of Fringe (Favorite Drama); Joel McHale, Donald Glover and Danny Pudi of Community (Comedy); Christina Aguilera and Adam Levine of The Voice (Singing Competition); Lana Parrilla (Favorite Villain) of Once Upon a Time (New Show); and Jared Padalecki and Jensen Ackles of Supernatural (Horror)	Photo montage	
April 30	Chris O'Donnell and LL Cool J of NCIS: Los Angeles	Photograph	
**May 7**	"Finale Preview," featuring Felicity Huffman, Eva Longoria, Teri Hatcher, and Marcia Cross of Desperate Housewives	Photograph	
May 21	Hugh Laurie of House, on the week of the series' finale	Photo illustration	Photo: David Johnson/Fox; illustration: Charles Tevis
May 28	Anna Paquin and Christopher Meloni of True Blood	Photograph	Sheryl Nields
June 4	"Burning [Season Finale] Questions Answered!"	Photo montage	
June 11	The return of Dallas (2 covers); *Jordana Brewster, Josh Henderson, Linda Gray, and Larry Hagman; *Brenda Strong, Patrick Duffy, Julie Gonzalo, and Jesse Metcalfe	Photograph	Mark Seliger/TNT
**June 18**	Michael Ealy of Common Law, Patrick J. Adams of Suits, and Matthew Bomer of White Collar	Photograph	Gavin Bond
**July 2**	Kyra Sedgwick of The Closer	Photograph	Perry Hagopian
**July 16**	*"Sci-Fi Preview" (newsstand cover); *Remembering Andy Griffith (subscriber cover)	*Sci-Fi: photo montage *Griffith: photograph	
**July 30**	2012 Olympic Games preview, featuring Team USA athletes LeBron James, Michael Phelps, Hope Solo, and Jordyn Wieber (separate covers)	Photograph	
**August 13**	"TV's Highest Paid Stars"	Photo montage	
August 27	Britney Spears, Simon Cowell, Demi Lovato, and L. A. Reid of The X Factor	Photograph	Nino Munoz/Fox
September 3	Michael J. Fox	Photograph	Wesley Mann/Contour by GettyImages
September 10	Emmy Awards host Jimmy Kimmel (4 covers)	Photograph	
September 17	"Fall Preview" (5 covers); *Stephen Amell of Arrow; *Mindy Kaling of The Mindy Project; *Lucy Liu and Jonny Lee Miller of Elementary; *Hayden Panettiere and Connie Britton of Nashville; *Matthew Perry of Go On	Photograph	Adam Olszewski
September 24	*"Returning Favorites" issue (newsstand cover); *Ginnifer Goodwin, Josh Dallas, Jennifer Morrison, and Lana Parrilla of Once Upon a Time (separately on four subscriber covers)	Favorites: photo montage Once: photograph	
October 1	"Fall Cable Preview," featuring Michael C. Hall and Jennifer Carpenter of Dexter	Photograph	
October 8	Emily VanCamp and Nick Wechsler of Revenge	Photograph	
October 15	Taraji P. Henson, Jim Caviezel, and Michael Emerson of Person of Interest	Photograph	
**October 22**	Claire Danes and Damian Lewis of Homeland	Photograph	Adam Olszewski
November 5	Stana Katic and Nathan Fillion of Castle	Illustration	
November 12	The cast of NCIS (multiple covers)	Photograph	
**November 19**	"Hot List 2012," featuring Adam Levine of The Voice	Photograph	
December 3	"Holiday Preview," featuring the cast of The Middle	Photograph	
**December 10**	*Matt Smith of Doctor Who, the 2012 winner of TV Guide's "Fan Favorite Cover Contest"; *Remembering Larry Hagman (flipside cover)	Photograph	*Smith: Adrian Rogers for BBC; *Hagman: Douglas Dubler (1982 archive photo)
December 17 (D)	"TV Goes Dark: Inside the Networks' Twisted New Shows," featuring images from Red Widow, Hannibal, The Following, and Cult	Photo montage	
**December 24**	"Cheers & Jeers: 2012's Best and Worst in TV"	Photo montage	
December 31 (D)	Jillian Michaels of The Biggest Loser	Photograph	

== 2013 ==
Issue date	Cover subject	Cover type	Artist
January 7	2013 "Winter Preview," featuring Dan Stevens and Michelle Dockery of Downton Abbey	Photograph	Nick Briggs/Carnival Films
January 14	John Noble, Anna Torv, and Joshua Jackson of Fringe, on the week of the series' finale	Photograph	
January 21	Kevin Bacon of The Following	Photograph	
**January 27**	Linda Gray and Patrick Duffy of Dallas	Photograph	
February 4 (D)	"Is There Too Much TV?"	Photo montage	
**February 11**	Andrew Lincoln of The Walking Dead	Photograph	
February 18 (D)	"Oscar Preview"	Photo montage	
**February 25**	Timothy Olyphant of Justified	Photograph	
March 4 (D)	"TV's Hottest Net(Flix)," with "Flix" crossing out "work" in red writing	Photo montage	
March 11	"Spring Preview," featuring Tracy Spiridakos and Billy Burke of Revolution	Photograph	
March 18	Kerry Washington and Tony Goldwyn of Scandal	Photograph	
**March 25**	The houses of Game of Thrones (Three covers); *House Lannister (Peter Dinklage, Lena Headey and Nikolaj Coster-Waldau); *House Stark (Kit Harington, Richard Madden and Michelle Fairley); *House Targaryen (Emilia Clarke)	Photograph	Gavin Bond
April 1 (D)	Jessica Paré and Jon Hamm of Mad Men	Photograph	
**April 8**	*TV Guide's "60th Anniversary Issue," featuring Photomosaic recreations of previous covers (6 covers); **Lucille Ball of I Love Lucy (January 12, 1957 cover); **William Shatner and Leonard Nimoy of Star Trek (March 4, 1967 cover); **Mary Tyler Moore of The Mary Tyler Moore Show (February 26, 1972 cover); **Bill Cosby of The Cosby Show (March 22, 1986 cover); **Matthew Fox of Lost (January 30, 2005 cover); **Homer Simpson of The Simpsons; *The 50th anniversary of General Hospital, featuring Genie Francis and Anthony Geary as Luke and Laura (flipside cover; Photomosaic of 1981 photo)	Photomosaic	Robert Silvers
April 15 (D)	Gabriel Byrne of Vikings	Photograph	
**April 22**	"Fan Favorites" poll results, featuring Stephen Amell of Arrow (New Show); Jim Parsons (actor) of The Big Bang Theory (Comedy and ensemble cast); Nathan Fillion and Stana Katic of Castle (Best Couple); Kerry Washington of Scandal (drama); and Matt Smith of Doctor Who (Science Fiction/Fantasy/Horror)	Photo montage	
April 29 (D)	Usher, Adam Levine, Blake Shelton and Shakira of The Voice, featured in photos from the show	Photo montage	
**May 6**	"Finale Preview," featuring Mark Harmon of NCIS	Photograph	
May 13 (D)	A salute to The Office	Photo montage	
**May 20**	The cast of The Big Bang Theory	Photograph	
May 27 (D)	"Sneak Peek: The New Fall Season"	Photo montage	
June 3	"Summer Preview"	Photo montage	
June 10	"Sci-Fi Preview"	Photo montage	
**June 17**	Sasha Alexander and Angie Harmon of Rizzoli & Isles	Photograph	Perry Hagopian
June 24 (D)	A preview of Under the Dome	Photographs	
**July 1**	*Michael C. Hall of Dexter; *Remembering James Gandolfini (flipside cover)	Photograph	
July 8 (D)	Remembering James Gandolfini	Photograph	
**July 15**	Gabriel Macht and Patrick J. Adams of Suits	Photograph	
July 22	Comic-Con Edition (eight covers; digital and subscribers only); *The Vampire Diaries (2 covers); Arrow (2 cover); *Supernatural (2 covers); *An illustrated cover of Superman and Batman (separate covers)	Photographs illustration	
**July 29**	Bryan Cranston and Aaron Paul of Breaking Bad	Photograph	
August 5 (D)	"Comic-Con preview," featuring castmember photos from Game of Thrones, Arrow, The Following, Doctor Who, The Vampire Diaries and The Walking Dead	Photo montage	
**August 12**	Jeffrey Donovan of Burn Notice	Photograph	
August 19 (D)	Liev Schreiber of Ray Donovan	Photograph	
**August 26**	"TV's Highest Paid Stars," featuring Jim Parsons of The Big Bang Theory	Photograph	
September 2 (D)	2013 Emmy Awards preview, featuring host Neil Patrick Harris holding an Emmy	Photograph	
September 9	Robin Williams and Sarah Michelle Gellar of The Crazy Ones	Photograph	
September 16	"Fall Preview: All the scoop on 36 new shows!"	Photo montage	
September 23	"Returning Favorites" issue, featuring Michael J. Fox of The Michael J. Fox Show	Photograph	
September 30	Damian Lewis of Homeland	Photograph	
October 7	Ellen Pompeo and Patrick Dempsey of Grey's Anatomy	Photograph	
October 14	Lucy Liu and Jonny Lee Miller of Elementary	Photograph	
**October 21**	Mark Harmon and Michael Weatherly of NCIS	Photograph	
October 28 (D)	A profile of American Horror Story: Coven, featuring Jessica Lange and, in insets, Sarah Paulson, Kathy Bates, and Taissa Farmiga	Photo montage	
November 4	James Spader of The Blacklist	Photograph	
**November 11**	"Hot List" issue, featuring Ming-Na Wen and Clark Gregg of Marvel's Agents of S.H.I.E.L.D.	Photograph	
November 18 (D)	Lauren German, Taylor Kinney, Jesse Spencer and Monica Raymund of Chicago Fire	Photograph	
**November 25**	Matt Smith of Doctor Who	Photograph	Adrian Rogers/BBC
December 2 (D)	Carrie Underwood as Maria Von Trapp in The Sound of Music Live!	Photograph	
**December 9**	Tyler Posey and Tyler Hoechlin of Teen Wolf, winner of TV Guide's "Fan Favorites Cover Contest"	Photograph	Matthew Welch/MTV
December 16 (D)	"Inside The New SNL"	Photo montage	
**December 23**	"Cheers & Jeers: 2013's Best and Worst in TV"	Photo illustration	Peter Max
December 30 (D)	Gillian Jacobs, Yvette Nicole Brown, Alison Brie, Danny Pudi and Joel McHale of Community	Photograph	

== 2014 ==
Issue date	Cover subject	Cover type	Artist
January 6	2014 "Winter Preview," featuring Josh Holloway of Intelligence	Photograph	Justin Stephens
January 13	Nicole Beharie and Tom Mison of Sleepy Hollow	Photograph	Adam Olszewski
**January 20**	Kevin Bacon and James Purefoy of The Following	Photograph	CPI Syndication
January 27 (D)	Super Bowl XLVIII preview, featuring Russell Wilson of the Seattle Seahawks and Peyton Manning of the Denver Broncos	Photo montage	
**February 3**	2014 Winter Olympics preview	Photo montage	
February 10 (D)	Jay Leno	Photograph	
**February 17**	Danai Gurira, Andrew Lincoln, and Norman Reedus of The Walking Dead (separate covers)	Photograph	Frank Ockenfels 3/AMC
February 24 (D)	Keri Russell and Matthew Rhys of The Americans	Photograph	
March 2	"Spring Preview"	Photo montage	
**March 10**	*Harry Connick Jr. of American Idol (newsstand cover); *Eric Christian Olsen and Daniela Ruah of NCIS: Los Angeles (subscriber cover)	Photograph	Connick: Palma Kolansky
**March 24**	The finale of How I Met Your Mother (four covers); *Neil Patrick Harris; *Harris with Cobie Smulders; *Cristin Milioti and Josh Radnor; *Alyson Hannigan and Jason Segel	Photograph	Andrew Macpherson
**April 7**	Kit Harington of Game of Thrones	Photograph	Jeff Lipsky
**April 21**	Homer Simpson of The Simpsons with a Lego version of Marge	Illustration	Matt Groening and 20th Century Fox
**May 5**	"Finale Preview," featuring Mark Harmon of NCIS	Photograph	Kevin Lynch
**May 19**	Jesse Tyler Ferguson and Eric Stonestreet of Modern Family	Photograph	Andrew Macpherson
**June 2**	Anna Paquin and Stephen Moyer of True Blood	Photograph	Art Streiber/HBO
**June 16**	Kiefer Sutherland of 24: Live Another Day	Photograph	Lorenzo Agius
**June 30**	NASCAR driver Dale Earnhardt Jr.	Photograph	Patrik Giardino
**July 14**	Eric Dane of The Last Ship	Photograph	Michael Muller/TNT
**July 28**	Rachelle Lefevre and Mike Vogel of Under the Dome	Photograph	Jim Wright
**August 11**	Caitriona Balfe and Sam Heughan of Outlander (TV Guide's first issue in a reduced print format)	Photograph	Eric Ogden
August 25	Peter Capaldi of Doctor Who	Photograph	BBC Worldwide
**September 1**	"Fall Sneak Peek Issue," featuring Scott Bakula of NCIS: New Orleans	Photograph	Randee St. Nicholas
September 15	"Fall Preview" issue	Photo montage	
September 22	"Returning Favorites" issue, featuring Elizabeth Lail and Georgina Haig of Once Upon a Time	Photograph	Adam Olszewski
**September 29**	"Fall Cable Preview," featuring Andrew Lincoln and Norman Reedus of The Walking Dead	Photograph	Frank Ockenfels 3/AMC
**October 13**	Mark Harmon of NCIS	Photograph	Kevin Lynch
**October 27**	Ben McKenzie of Gotham	Photograph	Peter Yang
**November 10**	Jesse Spencer and Taylor Kinney of Chicago Fire	Photograph	Jeff Riedel
**November 24**	Grant Gustin of The Flash and Stephen Amell of Arrow	Photograph	Adam Olszewski
**December 8**	"Fan Favorites: Your picks for TV's top shows and stars!"	Photo montage	
**December 22**	"Cheers & Jeers: 2014's Best and Worst in TV"	Photo montage	

== 2015 ==
Issue date	Cover subject	Cover type	Artist
**January 5**	"2015 Preview," featuring Michelle Dockery of Downton Abbey	Photograph	Nick Briggs for TV Guide
**January 19**	Viola Davis of How to Get Away with Murder (This cover includes a small "Je suis Charlie" button next to the TV Guide logo in tribute to the lives lost in the Charlie Hebdo shooting incident on January 7 in Paris, France)	Photograph	Don Reed for TV Guide
**February 2**	Tom Selleck of Blue Bloods	Photograph	Jeff Lipsky
**February 16**	Andrew Lincoln and Norman Reedus of The Walking Dead (separate covers)	Photograph	Frank Ockenfels 3/AMC
March 2	Kevin Spacey of House of Cards	Photograph	Sheryl Nields/August
**March 9**	"The Funny Issue," featuring guest editor Joel McHale of Community	Photograph	Justin Stephens
**March 23**	Elisabeth Moss and Jon Hamm of Mad Men, in a cover featuring TV Guide's 1968–1988 logo	Photograph	Jeff Lipsky
**April 6**	Lena Headey and Nikolaj Coster-Waldau of Game of Thrones	Photograph	Lorenzo Aglus
**April 20**	Juan Pablo Di Pace of A.D. The Bible Continues	Photograph	Joe Albias/LightWorkers Media/NBC
**May 4**	"Finale Preview," featuring Scott Bakula of NCIS: New Orleans	Photograph	Jeff Lipsky
**May 18**	David Duchovny of Aquarius	Photograph	Eric Ogden
June 1	"Summer Preview"	Photo illustration	Josue Evilla
**June 8**	Dwayne Johnson of Ballers	Photograph	Peter Yang
June 22	"25 Shows to Binge Right Now... and Where to Stream Them"	Photo montage	
**June 29**	Liev Schreiber of Ray Donovan	Photograph	Justin Stephens
**July 13**	Ian Ziering and Tara Reid of Sharknado 3: Oh Hell No!	Photograph	Bo Derek
**July 27**	Jon Stewart of The Daily Show	Photograph	Jay Brooks/Guardian News & Media
**August 10**	Kermit the Frog and Miss Piggy of The Muppets, in a cover featuring a felt-green TV Guide logo	Photograph	Bob D'Amico/ABC
August 24	Kim Dickens and Cliff Curtis of Fear the Walking Dead	Illustration	Richard Davies
**August 31**	"Fall Sneak Peek Issue," featuring Masi Oka and Zachary Levi of Heroes Reborn	Photograph	Adam Olszewski
September 14	"Fall Preview"	Photo illustration	Matt Herring
September 21	"Returning Favorites" issue, featuring Viola Davis of How to Get Away with Murder	Photograph	Brian Bowen Smith
**September 28**	John Stamos of Grandfathered	Photograph	Jim Wright
**October 12**	Michael Weatherly of NCIS	Photograph	Jim Wright
**October 26**	Melissa Benoist of Supergirl	Photograph	Justin Stephens
**November 9**	"TV's New Kick-Ass Women," featuring Melissa Benoist of Supergirl, Priyanka Chopra of Quantico, Jennifer Carpenter of Limitless, and Jaimie Alexander of Blindspot	Photo illustration	Richard Davies
**November 23**	"The Power Issue," featuring Terrence Howard and Taraji P. Henson of Empire (featuring the TV Guide logo in gold)	Photograph	Justin Stephens
**December 7**	Star Wars Rebels characters Kanan Jarrus and Darth Vader	Illustration	Disney XD/Lucasfilm Animation
**December 21**	"Cheers & Jeers: 2015's Best & Worst in TV"	Photo/type illustration	Ben Tellion

== 2016 ==
Issue date	Cover subject	Cover type	Artist
**January 4**	Jennifer Lopez of Shades of Blue	Photograph	Kenneth Willardt
**January 18**	Gillian Anderson and David Duchovny of The X-Files	Photograph	Frank Ockenfels/Fox
**February 1**	Norman Reedus and Andrew Lincoln of The Walking Dead	Photograph	Jeff Lipsky
**February 15**	Taylor Kinney of Chicago Fire	Photograph	Chris Haston/NBC
February 29	Jeff Garlin, Wendi McLendon-Covey, and Sean Giambrone of The Goldbergs	Photograph	Adam Olszewski
**March 7**	Mark Harmon of NCIS	Photograph	Kevin Lynch for TV Guide
**March 21**	Hugh Laurie of The Night Manager	Photograph	Mitch Jenkins/Ink Factory/AMC
**April 4**	Caitriona Balfe and Sam Heughan of Outlander	Photograph	Don Flood
**April 18**	Nikolaj Coster-Waldau of Game of Thrones	Photograph	Lorenzo Aglus/CPI for TV Guide
May 2	Tom Selleck of Blue Bloods	Photograph	Jeff Lipski/CPI for TV Guide
**May 9**	Michael Weatherly of NCIS	Photograph	Jeff Lipski/CPI
**May 23**	Simon Cowell of America's Got Talent	Photograph	Art Streiber/NBC
**June 6**	Scott Speedman, Ellen Barkin, and Shawn Hatosy of Animal Kingdom	Photograph	Steven Lippman/TNT
June 20	Seth Meyers of Late Night	Photograph	Lloyd Bishop/NBC
**June 27**	"Game Show Fever" (3 covers); *Alec Baldwin of Match Game; *Steve Harvey of Celebrity Family Feud; *Michael Strahan of The $100,000 Pyramid	Photograph	Baldwin: Steve Schofield; Harvey: Robert Ector; Strahan: Steve Erle
**July 11**	Dwayne Johnson of Ballers	Photograph	Nino Munoz/CPI
**July 25**	Rami Malek and Christian Slater of Mr. Robot	Photograph	Jim Wright
**August 9**	2016 Summer Olympics edition, featuring Team USA athletes Michael Phelps, Carli Lloyd, and Simone Biles	Photo montage	Phelps: Stacy Revere/Getty Images; Lloyd: Alexis Cuarezma/Sports Illustrated/Contour by Getty Images; Biles: Gregory Bull/AP
**August 22**	"Ultimate Fall TV Catch-Up Guide," featuring Jaimie Alexander and Sullivan Stapleton of Blindspot (Inset: Henry Winkler and William Shatner of Better Late Than Never)	Photograph	Blindspot: Sandro/NBC; Better: Paul Drinkwater/NBC
**September 5**	"Fall Sneak Peek," featuring Clayne Crawford and Damon Wayans of Lethal Weapon	Photograph	Brian Bowen Smith/Fox
September 19	Fall preview issue, featuring Kiefer Sutherland of Designated Survivor and, in insets, Michael Weatherly of Bull, Kristen Bell and Ted Danson of The Good Place, and Matt LeBlanc of Man with a Plan	Photograph	Sutherland, Weatherly, and Place: Maarten de Boer; LeBlanc: Elisabeth Caren/CBS
September 26	"Returning Favorites" issue, featuring Duane Henry, Wilmer Valderrama, and Jennifer Esposito of NCIS and, in insets, NCIS' Mark Harmon, Grey's Anatomy's Ellen Pompeo, and Blue Bloods' Tom Selleck	Photograph	NCIS & Harmon: Kevin Lynch; Pompeo: Bob D'Amico/ABC; Selleck: Smaltz + Raskind/CBS
October 3	Sarah Jessica Parker of Divorce	Photograph	Yu Tsai/Contour by Getty Images
**October 10**	Michael Weatherly of Bull	Photograph	Maarten de Boer
**October 24**	Téa Leoni of Madam Secretary	Photograph	Yu Tsai/Contour by Getty Images
**November 7**	Ryan Phillippe of Shooter	Photograph	Jeff Lipsky
**November 21**	Andrew Lincoln and Jeffrey Dean Morgan of The Walking Dead	Photograph	Frank Ockenfels 3/AMC
**December 5**	Jodie Sweetin, Candace Cameron-Bure, Andrea Barber, and (in inset) John Stamos of Fuller House	Photograph	Robert Trachtenberg/Netflix
**December 19**	Mandy Moore and Milo Ventimiglia of This Is Us	Photograph	Maarten de Boer

== 2017 ==
Issue date	Cover subject	Cover type	Artist
**January 2**	Arnold Schwarzenegger of The New Celebrity Apprentice	Photograph	Art Streiber/NBC
**January 16**	Mariska Hargitay of Law & Order: Special Victims Unit	Photograph	Virginia Sherwood/NBC
**January 30**	Jimmy Smits, Miranda Otto, and Corey Hawkins of 24: Legacy	Photograph	Michael Becker/Fox
**February 13**	Matt Lauer of Today	Photograph	Andrew Eccles/NBC
February 27	Ray Liotta and Jennifer Lopez of Shades of Blue	Photograph	Maarten de Boer
**March 6**	Lynn Whitfield, Merle Dandridge, and Oprah Winfrey of Greenleaf	Photograph	Maarten de Boer
**March 20**	Katie Holmes and Matthew Perry of The Kennedys: After Camelot	Photograph	Steve Wilkie/Reelz Channel, LLC
**April 3**	Pierce Brosnan of The Son	Photograph	James Minchin/AMC
**April 17**	Taylor Kinney and Jesse Spencer of Chicago Fire	Photograph	Corey Nickols/Getty Images
**May 1**	Adam Levine, Gwen Stefani, Blake Shelton, and Alicia Keys of The Voice	Photograph	Brian Bowen Smith/NBC
**May 15**	Kyle MacLachlan of Twin Peaks	Photograph	Michael Schwartz/Contour by Getty Images
**May 29**	Gordon Ramsay of The F Word	Photograph	James Dimmock/Fox
**June 12**	Ashton Kutcher of The Ranch	Photograph	James Dimmock/Netflix
**June 26**	Megyn Kelly of NBC News	Photograph	Brian Doben/NBC
**July 10**	"Sci-Fi Preview," featuring Sophie Turner of Game of Thrones	Photograph	Helen Sloan/HBO
**July 24**	Jessica Biel of The Sinner	Photograph	Pamela Hanson/Trunk Archive
**August 7**	Kelsey Grammer and Matt Bomer of The Last Tycoon	Photograph	Robert Trachtenberg
**August 21**	"Fall Sneak Peek," featuring Amy Acker and Stephen Moyer of The Gifted	Photograph	Michael Becker/Fox
**September 4**	"The 65th Annual Fall Preview"	Word art	Ben Tallon
**September 18**	"Returning Favorites" issue, featuring Caitriona Balfe and Sam Heughan of Outlander	Photograph	Jason Bell/Starz Entertainment
**October 2**	The cast of Will & Grace	Photograph	Andrew Eccles/NBC
**October 16**	Sela Ward of Graves	Photograph	Smalls & Raskind/Contour by Getty Images for TV Guide
**October 30**	Juan Diego Botto and Michelle Dockery of Good Behavior	Photograph	Marc Horn/TNT
**November 13**	Mark Harmon of NCIS	Photograph	Kevin Lynch
**November 27**	Michael Weatherly of Bull	Photograph	Nigel Parry
**December 11**	"Cheers & Jeers: The 46 Best & Worst Things in TV This Year!"	Photo montage	
**December 25**	Gillian Anderson and David Duchovny of The X-Files	Photograph	Frank Ockenfels/Fox

== 2018 ==
Issue start	Issue end	Cover subject	Cover type (credit)
January 8	January 21	"2018 Preview," featuring Ty Pennington of Trading Spaces	Photograph (Scott Witter/TLC)
January 22	February 4	Ellen Pompeo of Grey's Anatomy	Photograph (Bob D'Amico/ABC)
February 5	February 18	Winter Olympics preview, featuring Team USA athletes Lindsey Vonn, Shaun White, and Maia & Alex Shibutani	Photo montage (Background image: Shutterstock; Vonn: Harry How/GettyImages; White: Matthew Stockman/GettyImages; Shibutanis: Kyodo News for GettyImages)
February 19	March 4	Freddie Highmore of The Good Doctor	Photograph (Bob D'Amico/ABC)
March 5	March 18	Ryan Seacrest, Katy Perry, Lionel Richie, and Luke Bryan of American Idol	Photograph (Maarten de Boer for Getty Images)
March 19	April 1	"Spring Preview," featuring Roseanne Barr and John Goodman of Roseanne	Photograph
April 2	April 15	"The 65 Best Episodes of the 21st Century," in commemoration of TV Guide's 65th anniversary	Word art
April 16	April 29	David Boreanaz of SEAL Team	Photograph
April 30	May 13	Pauley Perrette of NCIS	Photograph
May 14	May 27	Drew and Jonathan Scott of Property Brothers	Photograph
May 28	June 10	"Summer Preview" issue, featuring Judy Reyes, Jenn Lyon, Niecy Nash, Carrie Preston, and Karrueche Tran of Claws	Photograph (TNT)
June 11	June 24	Kevin Costner of Yellowstone	Photograph (Jim Wright)
June 25	July 8	Tom Selleck of Blue Bloods	Photograph (Jeff Lipsky/CPI Syndication)
July 9	July 22	Kevin Hart of TKO: Total Knock Out	Photograph
July 23	August 5	André Holland, Sissy Spacek, and Bill Skarsgård of Castle Rock	Photograph
August 6	August 19	Howie Mandel, Mel B, Simon Cowell, and Heidi Klum of America's Got Talent (the first issue to feature listings for streaming programming)	Photograph
August 20	September 2	John Krasinski of Jack Ryan	Photograph
September 3	September 16	"Fall Preview 2018: Your Complete Guide to Every New Show"	Word art
September 17	September 30	Mariska Hargitay of Law & Order: Special Victims Unit	Photograph
October 1	October 14	Scott Bakula of NCIS: New Orleans	Photograph
October 15	October 28	Misha Collins, Jensen Ackles, and Jared Padalecki of Supernatural	Photograph
October 29	November 11	Caitriona Balfe and Sam Heughan of Outlander	Photograph
November 12	November 25	Tim Allen and Nancy Travis of Last Man Standing	Photograph
November 26	December 9	Missy Peregrym and Zeeko Zaki of FBI	Photograph
December 10	December 23	"Holiday Issue," featuring Savannah Guthrie and Hoda Kotb of Today	Photograph
December 24	January 6	Ted Danson and Kristen Bell of The Good Place (Inset: Seth MacFarlane of The Orville)	Photograph

== 2019 ==
Issue start	Issue end	Cover subject	Cover type (credit)
January 7	January 20	2019 "Preview," featuring Kit Harington of Game of Thrones	Photograph
January 21	February 3	Blue Bloods' Tom Selleck and, in inset, Bridget Moynahan, Vanessa Ray, and Sami Gayle	Photograph
February 4	February 17	Elvis Presley, on the occasion of a tribute commemorating his 1968 "Comeback Special" (2 covers)	Photograph
February 18	March 3	Rob Lowe of Mental Samurai	Photograph
March 4	March 17	Eric Christian Olsen and Daniela Ruah of NCIS: Los Angeles	Photograph
March 18	March 31	Johnny Galecki and Kaley Cuoco of The Big Bang Theory	Photograph
April 1	April 14	The final season of Game of Thrones (4 covers); *Emilia Clarke and Kit Harington; *Peter Dinklage; *Lena Headey and Nikolaj Coster-Waldau; *Maisie Williams, Sophie Turner, and Isaac Hempstead-Wright	Photograph
April 15	April 28	A profile of the new version of The Twilight Zone	Illustration (CBS All Access)
April 29	May 12	Jason Beghe of Chicago P.D., Taylor Kinney of Chicago Fire, and YaYa DaCosta of Chicago Med	Photograph
May 13	May 26	"The 10 Biggest Stars on TV," featuring Oprah Winfrey, Mark Harmon, and Joanna & Chip Gaines	Photo Montage
May 27	June 9	Kiefer Sutherland of Designated Survivor	Photograph
June 10	June 23	"First Look at Fall TV!" featuring returning NCIS cast member Cote de Pablo	Photograph
June 24	July 7	The cast of Stranger Things	Photograph
July 8	July 21	Gabriel Macht and Sarah Rafferty of Suits	Photograph
July 22	August 4	"Anniversaries Special" issue, featuring Robert Wagner and Stefanie Powers of Hart to Hart	Photograph
August 5	August 18	The cast of BH90210	Photograph
August 19	September 1	Aidan Turner of Poldark	Photograph
September 2	September 15	Fall Preview	Word art
September 16	September 29	Mark Harmon and Cote de Pablo of NCIS	Photograph
September 30	October 13	The cast of The Politician	Photograph
October 14	October 27	Misha Collins, Jared Padalecki, and Jensen Ackles of Supernatural (individually on 3 covers and together on a 4th)	Photograph
October 28	November 10	Mariska Hargitay of Law & Order: Special Victims Unit	Photograph
November 11	November 24	Heartstrings executive producer Dolly Parton	Photograph
November 25	December 8	Tom Selleck of Blue Bloods	Photograph
December 9	December 22	"Hallmark's Biggest Christmas Ever!" (4 covers); *Kristin Chenoweth and Scott Wolf of A Christmas Love Story; *Patti LaBelle and Holly Robinson Peete of A Family Christmas Gift; *Jack Wagner, Kevin McGarry, Erin Krakow, and Chris McNally of When Calls the Heart: Home for Christmas; *Alison Sweeney and Lucas Bryant of Time for You to Come Home for Christmas	Photograph
December 23	January 5	Cote de Pablo of NCIS	Photograph

== Sources ==
- Covers and table of contents page descriptions for the various issues
- TV Guide magazine website
- TV Guide magazine cover archive
