= Swimming Upstream =

2003 film by Russell Mulcahy

- Theatrical release poster
- Directed by: Russell Mulcahy
- Screenplay by: Tony Fingleton
- Based on: Swimming Upstream by Tony Fingleton; Diane Fingleton
- Produced by: Howard Baldwin; Karen Baldwin; Paul Pompian
- Starring: Geoffrey Rush; Judy Davis; Jesse Spencer
- Cinematography: Martin McGrath
- Edited by: Marcus D'Arcy
- Music by: Reinhold Heil; Johnny Klimek
- Production company: Crusader Entertainment
- Distributed by: Hoyts Distribution (Australia); Summit Entertainment (Overseas)
- Release date: 27 February 2003
- Running time: 114 minutes
- Country: Australia
- Language: English
- Box office: $769,832

Swimming Upstream is a 2003 Australian biographical drama film written by Tony Fingleton and directed by Russell Mulcahy. It stars Jesse Spencer, Geoffrey Rush, and Judy Davis. It shows the life of Fingleton (Spencer) from childhood to adulthood, and dealing with a topsy-turvy family. It is based on Fingleton's autobiography of the same name.

== Plot ==
The film shows ten years in the life of Anthony Fingleton, from when he was a young boy in the mid-1950s, to the day of the men's 100m backstroke final at the 1964 Summer Olympics. Growing up in Brisbane, Australia, Tony was the second of five children of working-class parents Harold and Dora Fingleton. It was a dysfunctional family, since Harold – who as a child had witnessed his alcoholic mother's degradation as a prostitute – was violent and unable to show equal love to all his children, and favored those showing sporting prowess. Harold was physically and emotionally abusive, especially toward Tony and his wife Dora. She tried to protect Tony from that abuse which only angered Harold more. The abuse was exacerbated by Harold's alcoholism, which in turn led to frequent difficulties with money as Harold, who worked at the docks only when ships were in port, was often off work, sometimes due to divisive labour unrest on the wharf, and strikes.

Tony was on good terms with most of his siblings, especially "number 3", John. But each of the five children did whatever they needed to do as self-preservation measures against Harold's abuse, sometimes at the expense of harmony with the others. As a refuge, the four youngest felt comfortable in the local pool. It was only when he found out that both Tony and John were good swimmers that Harold began to pay Tony any attention, and became their trainer. But nothing Tony did was ever good enough, Harold spurring on anyone else but Tony, and especially John. Initially the two swam different strokes, freestyle and backstroke, but Harold secretly shifted John to compete directly against his brother in state finals. After losing, Tony responded by training on his own, eventually placing second at the 1962 British Empire and Commonwealth Games, without his father's support - who had by this time become withdrawn and continued to drink. John, meanwhile, abandoned competitive swimming after failing to qualify, and his relationship with Tony remained strained.

Tony wanted to make his father proud, but also revealed to his mother that he saw swimming as a means to an end, a way to escape their life of poverty in Brisbane. This he did after his Commonwealth medal, when his application to Harvard University to enter with a sports scholarship was successful. He was offered a spot on the Australian Olympic team, but chose instead to attend Harvard. The film ends in the pool at Harvard, where he obtains an excellent backstroke time, as his life and family flash before him as he swims. The 1964 Olympics are being aired, with Dawn Fraser competing, and his coach asks him if he would rather have swum there. He replies no, he is "exactly where he wants to be". He has achieved his goal of escape from a dysfunctional childhood and is on track to a successful career, which is hinted in the closing credits.

== Cast ==
- Geoffrey Rush as Harold Fingleton
- Judy Davis as Dora Fingleton
- Jesse Spencer as Tony Fingleton
- Tim Draxl as John Fingleton
- Deborah Kennedy as Billie
- David Hoflin as Harold Fingleton Jr.
- Craig Horner as Ronald Fingleton
- Brittany Byrnes as Diane Fingleton
- Mark Hembrow as Tommy
- Melissa Thomas as Dawn Fraser
- Dawn Fraser as Dawn Fraser's coach
- Gyton Grantley as Swimmer

== Reception ==
Swimming Upstream received mixed reviews. On Rotten Tomatoes, the film holds a 61% rating with an average score of 5.7/10, sampled from 38 reviews. On Metacritic, the film has a score of 58 out of 100, indicating "mixed or average reviews", based on 14 reviews from critics.

John Fingleton has disputed the portrayal of events in the film, and went on to author a book about the life of his parents in 2011.

== See also ==
- Cinema of Australia
