= Flourish (film) =

- 2008 film poster
- Directed by: Kevin Palys
- Written by: Kevin Palys
- Produced by: Kevin Palys; Jennifer Morrison; BP Cooper; Jason Peterson
- Starring: Jennifer Morrison; Jesse Spencer; Leighton Meester; Daniel Roebuck; Olivia Burnette; Connie Ray; Ian Brennan
- Music by: Andrew Kaiser; Julian Sakata
- Release dates: March 3, 2006 (Cinequest Film Festival); November 14, 2006 (United States)
- Running time: 95 minutes
- Country: United States
- Language: English

Flourish is a 2006 American film written, produced, and directed by Kevin Palys. It stars Jennifer Morrison, Jesse Spencer, Leighton Meester, and Ian Brennan.

== Plot ==
The film tells the tale of Gabrielle Winters, a brain-damaged and institutionalized tutor and proofreader who elaborately recounts the disappearance of the sixteen-year-old girl she was babysitting.

== Cast ==
- Jennifer Morrison as Gabrielle Winters
- Jesse Spencer as Eddie Gator
- Leighton Meester as Lucy Covner
- Daniel Roebuck as Charles Covner
- Ian Brennan as Carter
- Olivia Burnette as Bridget Burnham
- Connie Ray as Wendy Covner

== Production ==
Flourish was shot in Los Angeles in May and June 2005.

== Release ==
The film had its world premiere at the 2006 Cinequest Film Festival. Flourish had a limited theatrical release in San Jose, California on January 17, 2008.

== Home media ==
The film was released on DVD worldwide on November 14, 2006. In spring 2008, it was re-released worldwide on DVD.
