= Patrik Giardino =

Swedish photographer and director

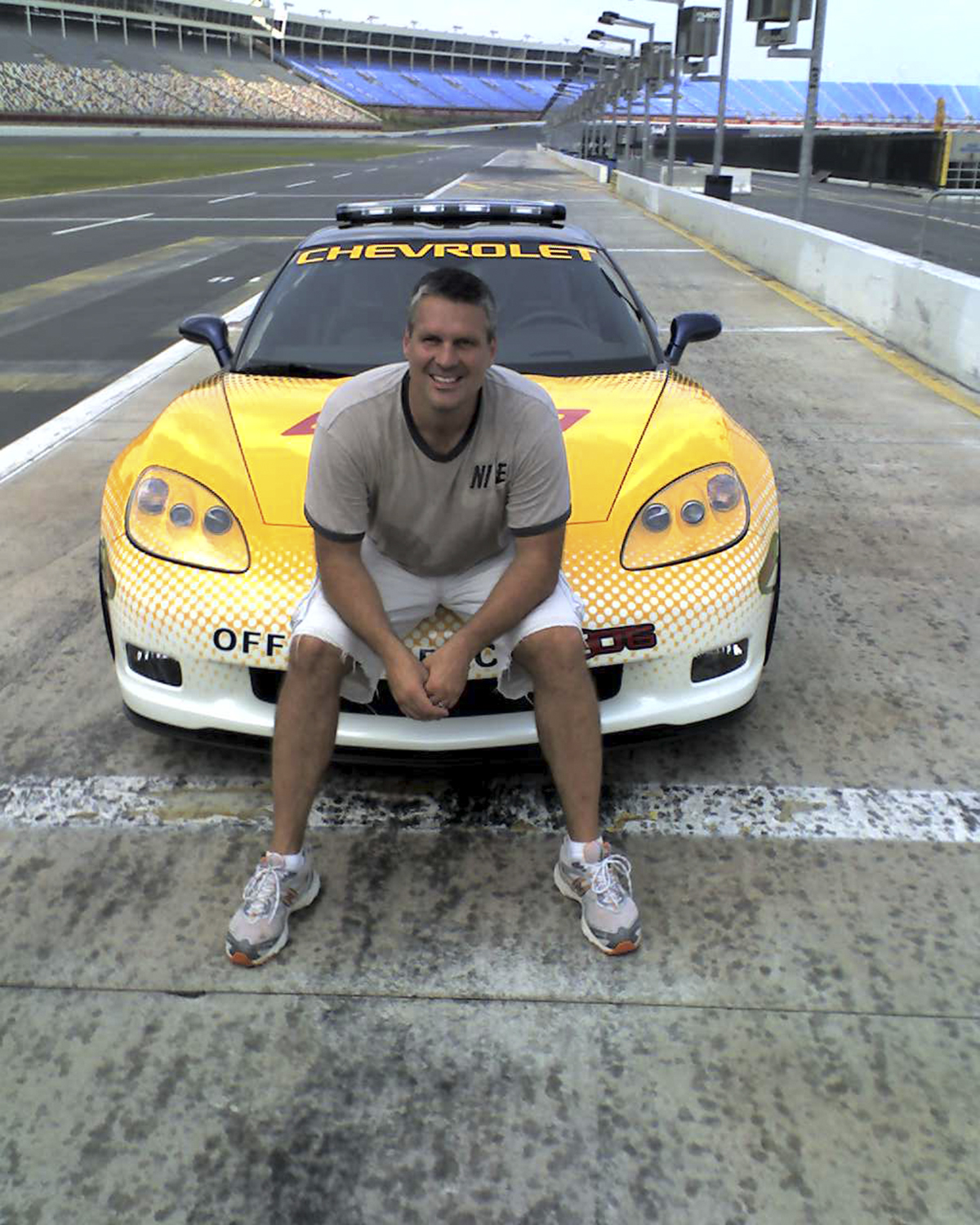
Patrik Giardino photo from NASCAR photo shoot for Maxim Magazine.

Patrik Giardino (born 1966) is a Swedish photographer and director based in America. He is best known for his celebrity portraits, advertising, sports photography and directing.

Giardino has worked with sports figures and celebrities such as Hugh Jackman, Vin Diesel, Justin Theroux, Chris Hemsworth, Liam Hemsworth, Josh Brolin, Alec Baldwin, Joe Manganiello, Andy Murray, Michael Phelps, LeBron James and Cristiano Ronaldo. He has shot worldwide print campaigns for Nike, Adidas, Virgin America, Universal, New Balance, Coca-Cola, Vitamin Water, US Army, Sony Ericsson and Samsung. His editorial work includes photography for Men's Health, Men's Journal, ESPN, TV Guide and Runner's World among others. He's directed commercials for Nike, Jaguar, Fujitsu, Merck, P&G, Oakley, UFC, USA Rugby and Reebok.

Giardino collaborated with Joe Manganiello to photograph his book, Evolution. Giardino shot the cover of the Mario Lopez biography Just Between Us and worked on America's Next Top Model.

Born in Malmö, Sweden, Patrik moved to California in 1996 to attend Art Center College of Design majoring in Photography. He is based in Los Angeles and represented by Bernstein & Andriulli for photography and Great Bowery Film for directing.
