= Colt 45 (2014 film) =

2014 film by Fabrice Du Welz

- Theatrical release poster
- Directed by: Fabrice du Welz
- Written by: Fathi Beddiar
- Produced by: Julien Arnoux; Sébastien Delloye; Daniel Delume; Thomas Langmann; Emmanuel Montamat
- Starring: Gérard Lanvin; JoeyStarr; Alice Taglioni; Ymanol Perset; Simon Abkarian
- Cinematography: Benoît Debie
- Music by: Benjamin Shielden
- Production companies: La Petite Reine; Orange Studio
- Distributed by: Warner Bros. Pictures
- Release date: 6 August 2014 (France)
- Running time: 85 minutes
- Country: France
- Language: French
- Box office: $630,787

Colt 45 is a 2014 French thriller film directed by Fabrice Du Welz and starring Ymanol Perset, Joey Starr and Gerard Lanvin. It is based on an idea by co-writer Fathi Beddiar.

== Cast ==
- Gérard Lanvin as Commandant Christian Chavez
- Joey Starr as Milo Cardena
- Alice Taglioni as Capitaine Isabelle Le Franc
- Ymanol Perset as Vincent Milès
- Simon Abkarian as Commandant Luc Denard
- Antoine Basler as Lieutenant Joseph Fleischmann
- Jo Prestia as Marco
- Salem Kali as Mehdi
- Michel Ferracci as Michel
- Alexandre Brasseur as Commandant Martial Ricaud
- Philippe Nahon as Préfet Pradier
- Anton Yakovlev as Carmini
- Amr Waked as Baron
- Malek Oudjail as Malek
- Redouane Behache as Tarek Derkaoui
- Aymen Saïdi as Kaïs Derkaoui
- Denis Braccini as Nicolaï
- Michaël Vander-Meiren as Moïse
- Philippe Petit as Pierre - BRI
- Gérard Watkins as Calhoun
- Mick Gould as 75th Ranger Regiment Major
- Richard Sammel as Major
- Mika'ela Fisher as Mika
- Jean-Michel Chapelain as Jean-Michel
- Habibur Rahman as Le directeur de banque
