= Denis Braccini =

French actor

Denis Braccini is a French actor.

== Career ==
In films, Denis Braccini plays in action movies (by Luc Besson, Florent Emilio Siri, Bob Swaim...) and intimate movies (by Christine Carrière, Laurent Tuel).

On television, he appears in many series and was the commissaire Thomas Quilichini in Mafiosa with Hélène Fillières and Thierry Neuvic.

== Filmography ==
=== Actor ===
==== Film ====
- 1995: Le videur (by Christophe Jacrot) (Short)
- 1997: Didier (by Alain Chabat) - Le type parc public
- 1997: Bouge ! (by Jérôme Cornuau) - Vigile 1
- 1997: K (by Alexandre Arcady) - Un policier à l'hôpital
- 1998: Taxi (by Luc Besson) - Chef Pompier
- 1998: J'aimerais pas crever un dimanche (by Didier Le Pêcheur) - Le patron de la pizzeria
- 1998: Bimboland (by Ariel Zeitoun) - Videur boîte de nuit
- 1999: Le Derrière (by Valérie Lemercier) - Le cuirman du Victory
- 1999: Qui plume la lune ? (by Christine Carrière) - Le Prof de Gym
- 2001: Les Morsures de l'aube (by Antoine de Caunes) - TBM 1
- 2001: Yamakasi (by Ariel Zeitoun)
- 2002: The Nest (by Florent Emilio Siri) - Le pompier
- 2002: The Bourne Identity (by Doug Liman) - Picot
- 2002: Peau d'Ange (by Vincent Pérez)
- 2002: La vie promise (by Olivier Dahan) - Policier en civil
- 2003: Bloody Pizza (by Michel Rodas) (Short)
- 2003: Lovely Rita, sainte patronne des cas désespérés (by Stéphane Clavier) - Hervé Baldini
- 2004: Nos amis les flics (by Bob Swaim) - Le patron du Mistral
- 2006: Jean-Philippe (by Laurent Tuel) - Jean-Paul
- 2007: Darling (by Christine Carrière) - Médecin du travail
- 2007: The Easy Way (by Jean-Paul Rouve) - Le truand #2
- 2008: Transporter 3 (by Olivier Megaton) - Custom Officer #1
- 2009: District 13: Ultimatum (by Patrick Alessandrin) - Homme de main waiter 1
- 2010: Gauche droite (by Stéphane Bouquet) (Short) - le Coach
- 2010: 22 Bullets (by Richard Berry) - Le Boumian
- 2011: Forces spéciales (by Stéphane Rybojad) - Criminel de Guerre Serbe
- 2013: Douce nuit (by Stéphane Bouquet) (Short) - Grand
- 2014: Colt 45 (by Fabrice du Welz) - Nicolaï

==== Television ====
- 1999: Tramontane - Maury
- 2001: Avocats et Associés - Le gardien de prison de Franck
- 2004: Les Cordier, juge et flic - Convoyeur
- 2004: La Nourrice (by Renaud Bertrand) (TV Movie) - Père Madeleine
- 2004: B.R.I.G.A.D. - Le Capitaine des gendarmes
- 2004: Père et Maire - Gilles Leperche
- 2006: L'État de Grace - Garde du corps 1
- 2007: The Murder of Princess Diana (TV Movie) - Henri Paul
- 2007: Sur le fil - Rieux
- 2007: Sauveur Giordano - Sbire 1
- 2007-2012: Fais pas ci, fais pas ça - Monsieur Azemar / Homme
- 2008: Femmes de loi - Responsible 707
- 2008: Elles et Moi (by Bernard Stora)
- 2008: R.I.S, police scientifique - L'agent de contrôle
- 2009: L'École du pouvoir (by Raoul Peck) (TV Movie) - Leader paysan
- 2009: Aveugle mais pas trop (by Charlotte Brandstrom) (TV Movie) - Le chauffeur de camion 1
- 2010: Mes amis, mes amours, mes emmerdes... - Le gardien de nuit
- 2010: La Cour des grands (TV Movie) - Le chauffeur de camion 1
- 2010: Marion Mazzano - Charpentier
- 2010-2014: Mafiosa - Thomas Quilichini
- 2011: Un flic - Ange Marachini
- 2013: Crossing Lines - Jacques

=== Screenwriter ===
- 2005: La Jeune femme qui lisait des romans d'amour, Régis Mardon, short

== Theatre ==
- 1993-1994: Woyzeck by Georg Büchner, dir Jean-Pierre Vincent - Théâtre de Nîmes, Théâtre du Rond-Point
- 1994: Cinq minutes pas plus by and dir Jean-Christophe Barc
- 1995: Turcaretby Alain-René Lesage, dir Eric Fauveau - Théâtre Montmartre-Galabru
- 1997: Attentif ensemble by François Rivière, dir Daniel Lucarini
