= Curse of the Talisman =

2001 film by Colin Budds

- the PAST unlocked a MYTH released
- Written by: Duncan Kennedy
- Directed by: Colin Budds
- Starring: Jesse Spencer; Capkin Van Alphen; Sara Gleeson
- Music by: Garry McDonald; Lawrence Stone
- Country of origin: United States
- Original language: English

Production
- Producer: Darryl Sheen
- Cinematography: Ben Nott
- Running time: 92 minutes
- Production companies: Coote/Hayes Productions; Paramount Television

Original release
- Network: UPN
- Release: March 19, 2001

Curse of the Talisman is a 2001 made-for-TV horror film directed by Colin Budds. It starred Jesse Spencer, Capkin Van Alphen and Sara Gleeson. The film premiered on UPN on March 19, 2001.

== Plot ==
Medieval gargoyles bring real Halloween terror to a group of small-town citizens when a dormant demon is unleashed and along with it a 900-year-old curse.

== Cast ==
- Jesse Spencer as Jeremy Campbell
- Capkin Van Alphen as Worker
- Sara Gleeson as Fiona
- Robert Coleby as Museum Curator
- Tempany Deckert as Miranda
- Max Garner Gore as Darryl
- Gus Mercurio as Junkyard Owner
- Rod Mullinar as Father Eccleston

== Soundtrack ==
Curse of the Talisman: Original Motion Picture Soundtrack
No.	Title	Writer(s)	Performer(s)	Length
1.	"Noctis Penaex"	Garry McDonald, Lawrence Stone	The Imogen Singers	3:38
2.	"Every Single Day"	Jag la Vista, Arabatzls	Boom Box	3:47
3.	"Libertine"	Cameron Wilson	The Daisy Cutters	3:32
4.	"It's Cool"	Kick, Jough, Oches	The Dream Poppies	3:25
5.	"Another Way"	Kick, Jough, Oches	The Dream Poppies	2:48

== Critical reception ==
Curse of the Talisman received mixed reviews generally unfavorable from critics. Clayton Trapp of Brilliant Observations on 1173 Films gave Curse of the Talisman one stars (out of two) and said, "Film gets on a formulaic track early and refuses to get off, which partly works for it. It's the least scary monster movie I've ever seen but it's satisfied to be there, they just want to stay on formula and entertain us the way that others have entertained them. No pretensions (no one is sitting around reading Nietzsche), no special effects addiction (but funny where used), no sex and gore over-the-topness (the gargoyles are actually kind of cute), no bullshit (or all bullshit, according to taste)." Video Picks for Perverts simply said, "There's no tits, either. Fucking worthless."
