= Myriam Muller =

Luxembourgish actress

- Born: 12 April 1971 (age 55); Luxembourg
- Occupation: Actress
- Years active: 1989–present

Myriam Muller (born 12 April 1971) is a Luxembourgish actress. She starred in Hochzäitsnuecht, which was screened in the Un Certain Regard section at the 1992 Cannes Film Festival.

== Selected filmography ==
- Hochzaeitsnuecht (1992)
- Marie de Nazareth (1995)
- 8½ Women (1999)
- Shadow of the Vampire (2000)
- The Murder of Princess Diana (2007)
- Don't Look Back (2009)
