= Tony Fingleton =

Australian swimmer

Medal record
British Empire and Commonwealth Games
Silver medal – second place	1962 Perth	220 yd backstroke

Anthony J. Fingleton is an Australian former competitive swimmer who won silver medal in 1962 British Empire and Commonwealth Games. He was invited to participate in 1964 Summer Olympics, but instead accepted a scholarship to study at Harvard University, where he swam for the Harvard Crimson swimming team. He remained in the United States after graduation and became a screenwriter and movie producer, including the 1991 Rik Mayall film, Drop Dead Fred.

In 2003 film director Russell Mulcahy made a biographical film about Tony, called Swimming Upstream, based on his autobiography. Tony Fingleton was played by Jesse Spencer and Harold, his father and chief antagonist, by Geoffrey Rush.

== See also ==
- List of Commonwealth Games medallists in swimming (men)
