= The End of Longing =

2016 play by Matthew Perry

- Original language: English
- Written by: Matthew Perry
- Genre: Comedy
- Setting: Los Angeles

Premiere
- Date: 11 February 2016
- Place: Playhouse Theatre, London

The End of Longing is a dark comedy play written by Matthew Perry. The play, which marked Perry's playwriting debut, made its West End and world premiere at the Playhouse Theatre in February 2016. The play made its United States debut Off-Broadway in May 2017 at the Lucille Lortel Theatre.

== Background ==
The End of Longing is written by former Friends actor Matthew Perry, in his playwriting debut. Perry wrote the first draft of the play over a period of ten days, with rewrites taking an additional year. A reading of the play was held in New York City in December 2015. Set in a bar in downtown Los Angeles, the play centres around four people in their forties who are searching for the meaning of life. Perry plays the drunk Jack and stated the role was "sort of an exaggerated form of myself" but added it was not an autobiographical part.

== Production history ==
=== West End production ===
On 4 December 2015, it was announced that the play would receive its world premiere at the West End's Playhouse Theatre on 11 February 2016, following previews from 2 February, for a limited run until 14 May. The play reunites Perry with director Lindsay Posner, whom he had previously worked with on the play Sexual Perversity in Chicago in 2003. Casting for the production includes Perry as Jack, Lloyd Owen as Joseph, Jennifer Mudge as Stephanie and Christina Cole as Stevie. The play is directed by Lindsay Posner, with choreography by Darren Carnall, fight direction by Terry King, design by Anna Fleischle, lighting design by Lucy Carter and composition and sound design by Isobel Waller-Bridge.

Rehearsals for the play began in January, meaning Perry could not appear in person at the Friends reunion, which was put together as a tribute to the show's director James Burrows. Speaking about the transition from actor to writer, Perry said that "being on stage makes you feel naked. Being on stage in a play that I have written will make me feel doubly naked.

The play received mixed reviews. The Guardian gave it a lukewarm review, concluding "while the play clearly aims to deal with four loners struggling to come to terms with early middle-age, it feels more like an extended sitcom in which there is little going on behind the lines." while WhatsOnStage.com was more enthusiastic, commenting "The writing is wired, raw, politically incorrect and very funny [...] Perry's a novice playwright, but one of great promise".

=== Off-Broadway production ===
The play was performed at the Lucille Lortel Theatre, Off-Broadway from May 18 to July 1, 2017, starring Perry as Jack and directed by Posner. It featured a new cast, including Quincy Dunn-Baker as Jeffrey (previously Joseph), Jennifer Morrison as Stephanie, and Sue Jean Kim as Stevie. The production's creative team differed from the London production in that it included set design by Derek McLane, lighting design by Ben Stanton, costume design by Sarah Laux, and sound design by Ryan Rumery. In an interview on Jimmy Kimmel Live! Perry revealed that he made changes to the script for New York, such as taking out a great deal of profanity.

The New York Times gave the play an unfavorable review: "the play remains trite even as it approaches seriousness" and "[Perry] has written a synthetic play that mostly points out just how much better 'Friends' was written."

== Principal roles and original cast ==
Character	West End performer	Off-Broadway performer
Jack	Matthew Perry	Matthew Perry
Jeffrey	Lloyd Owen	Quincy Dunn-Baker
Stephanie	Jennifer Mudge	Jennifer Morrison
Stevie	Christina Cole	Sue Jean Kim
