= Jennifer Morrison =

American actress and director (born 1979)

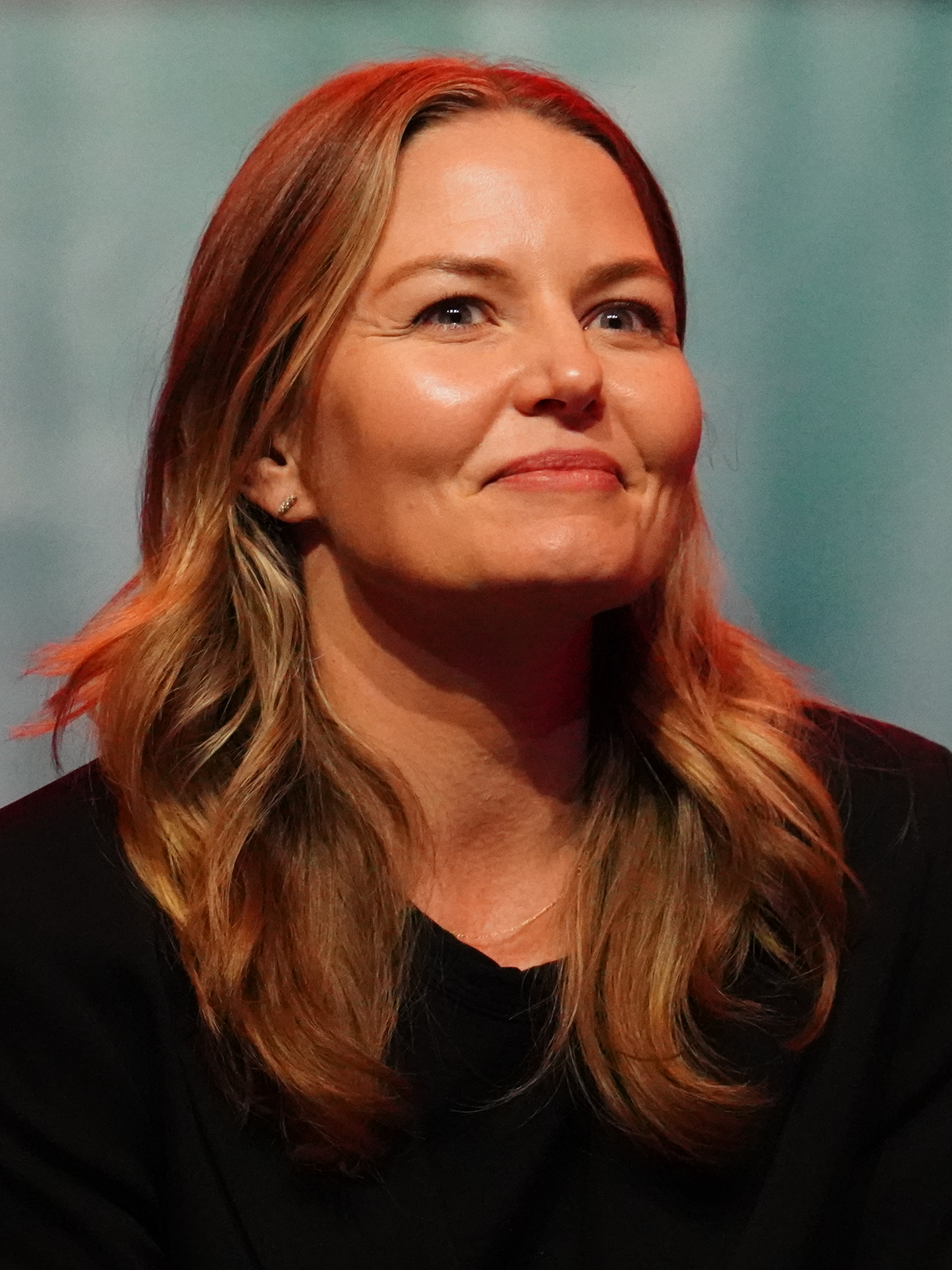
- Morrison in 2026
- Born: Jennifer Marie Morrison; April 12, 1979 (age 47); Chicago, Illinois, U.S.
- Education: Loyola University Chicago
- Occupations: Actress; director; producer
- Years active: 1993–present
- Partner: Gerardo Celasco (2019–present)
- Children: 1

Jennifer Marie Morrison (born April 12, 1979) is an American actress and director. She played the roles of Dr. Allison Cameron in the medical-drama series House (2004–2012) and Emma Swan in the ABC adventure-fantasy series Once Upon a Time (2011–2018). She has also portrayed Zoey Pierson, one of Ted Mosby's love interests, on the comedy series How I Met Your Mother; Winona Kirk, mother of James T. Kirk in the 2009 science-fiction film Star Trek; and Tess Conlon in the 2011 sports drama film Warrior. She made her feature-film directorial debut with Sun Dogs (2017).

== Early life ==
Morrison was born in Chicago, Illinois, and grew up in Arlington Heights, Illinois. She is the oldest of three children. Her father, David, is a retired music teacher and high-school band director who was named Teacher of the Year by the Illinois State Board of Education in 2003.

Morrison attended South Middle School, and then graduated from Prospect High School (where her parents worked) in 1997. She was an All-State clarinet player in the school's marching band, sang in the choir, and was a cheerleader in the school pep squad. She attended Loyola University Chicago, where she majored in theatre and minored in English, graduating in 2000. She studied at the Steppenwolf Theatre Company before moving to Los Angeles to pursue a career in acting.

== Career ==
=== Beginnings and film roles (1992–2010) ===
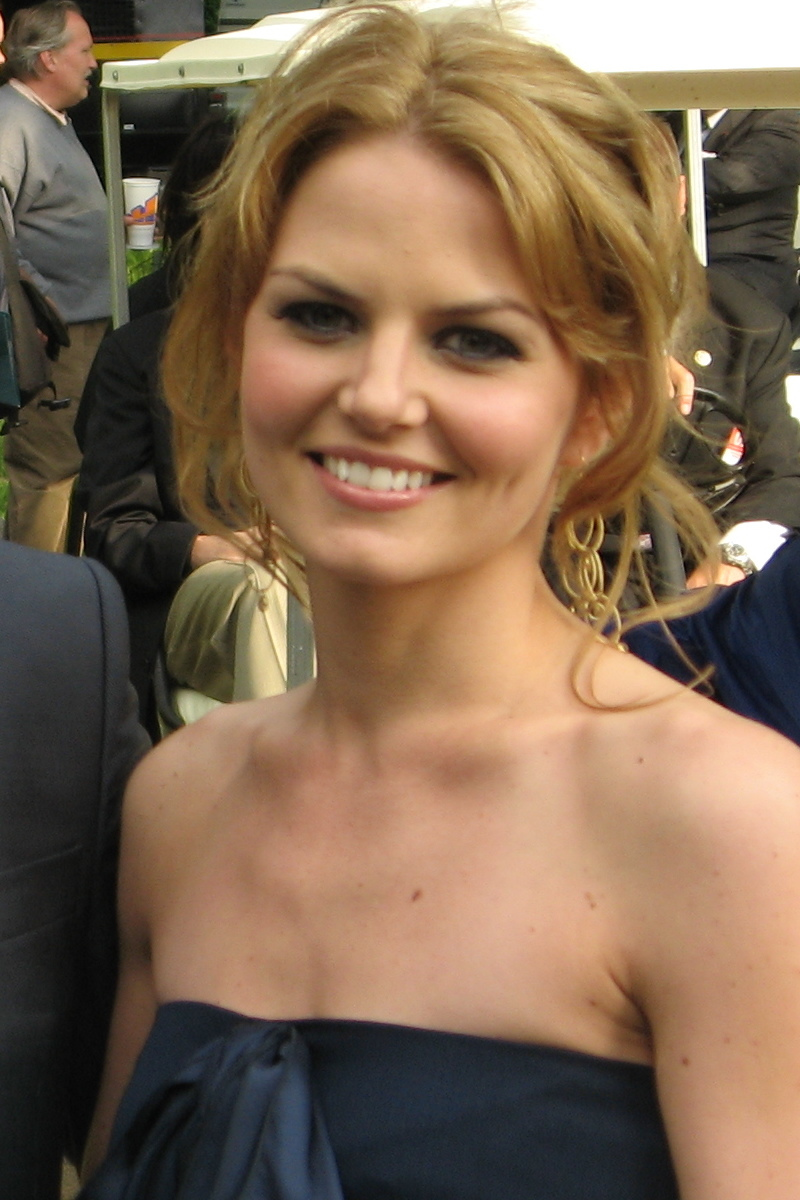
Morrison at the Fox Broadcasting Company upfronts in 2008

Morrison started her career as a child model, appearing in print advertisements for JCPenney and Montgomery Ward, and commercials for Rice Krispies and Mondo. She was featured on the cover of Sports Illustrated for Kids with basketball star Michael Jordan in May 1992. Morrison made her feature-film debut at the age of 14 in the 1994 film Intersection, and later appeared as Samantha in Stir of Echoes (1999). Morrison's first leading role came in the 2000 film Urban Legends: Final Cut, and she has since gone on to appear in films including Grind (2003), Surviving Christmas (2004), and Mr. & Mrs. Smith (2005).

In 2004, Morrison was cast as immunologist Allison Cameron on House. She played the role for the first six seasons of the show, from 2004 to 2009. Morrison's character left in the 2009 episode "Teamwork", but returned in the 2010 episode "Lockdown" to conclude Cameron's story. Morrison returned for the series finale "Everybody Dies" in 2012. In 2006, Morrison starred in and produced the independent film Flourish. She is also one of the producers who found Glee during its early draft and brought it to attention of writer Ryan Murphy, who adapted it into a television series. Morrison did not stay involved creatively, but is credited as an associate producer on the first season for her involvement in finding it and helping it get into the right hands.

In 2007, Morrison appeared as Kirce James in the computer game Command & Conquer 3: Tiberium Wars, a character who frequently interacts with the player during the course of the GDI campaign. Her film projects that year included Big Stan and The Murder of Princess Diana, a television film based on the book of the same name by Noel Botham. Produced by Lifetime and Working Title Television, Morrison portrays an American journalist who witnesses the car crash in which Diana, Princess of Wales was killed. In 2009, Morrison returned to the big screen, appearing in the opening scene of J. J. Abrams' Star Trek reboot as James T. Kirk's mother, Winona. After her contract on House was not renewed, it was announced in December 2009 that Morrison had been cast in the role of Kate Keller, Helen Keller's mother, in the Broadway-bound revival of The Miracle Worker.

=== Once Upon a Time and television (2011–2018) ===
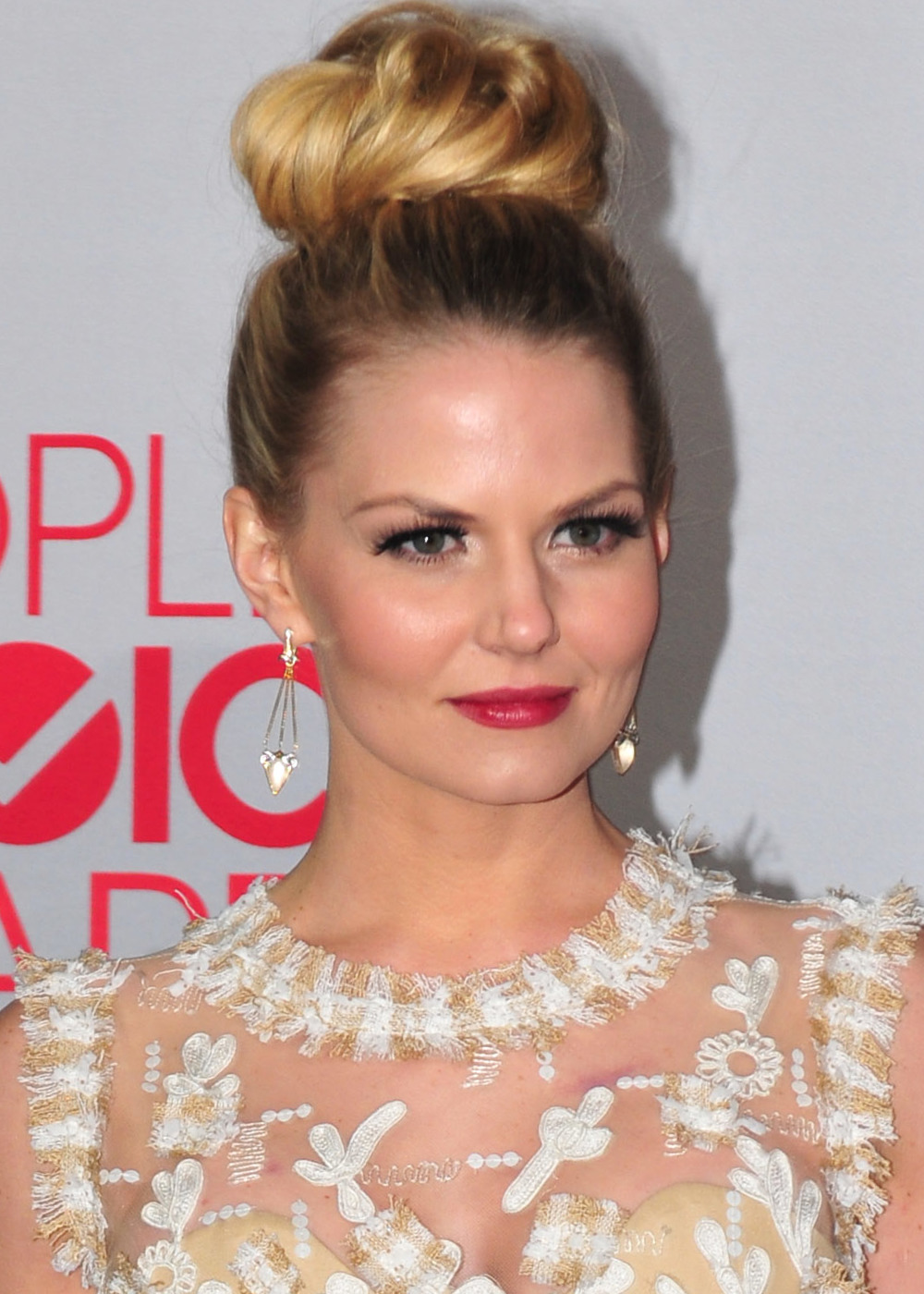
Morrison attending the 2012 People's Choice Awards

In the fall of 2010, Morrison appeared as a guest star in the fourth episode of NBC's Chase. She played the role of Faith, a single mother-turned-fugitive, who embarks on a bloody killing spree across Texas with her little daughter. She then joined the cast of CBS's How I Met Your Mother as recurring character Zoey Pierson, a mischievous architecture nerd and love interest of main character Ted Mosby's, and "the biggest female character we've maybe ever added to the show in Ted's life", according to executive producer Craig Thomas.

In 2011, Morrison appeared in Warrior, a film about two estranged brothers who enter a mixed martial arts tournament and are forced to confront their struggling relationship with each other and with their father. Morrison plays the wife of Joel Edgerton's character, struggling to keep her family together. Starting in October 2011, Morrison had a starring role in ABC's Once Upon a Time. She played the role of Emma Swan, a bail-bonds collector who turns out to be the daughter of Snow White and Prince Charming.

In April 2016, Morrison launched her own film production company, Apartment 3C Productions, named after the apartment she shared with her friends during her time at Loyola University Chicago. She directed her first feature film, Sun Dogs, under this label during the summer of 2016. In December 2017, Netflix announced it had acquired worldwide streaming rights to the film.

In March 2017, it was announced that Morrison was cast as Stephanie in an off-Broadway revival of the play The End of Longing. The performance lasted from May 18 to July 1, 2017. On May 8, 2017, Morrison announced via social media that she would not be returning to Once Upon a Time as a series regular for season seven, while also noting that she had agreed to return as a guest for one episode. That episode was the season's second, which aired in October 2017. However, she ultimately returned for the series finale, which aired in May 2018.

Morrison co-starred in Amityville: The Awakening as Candice. Originally shot in 2014, the film was released on Google Play on October 12, 2017, with a limited theatrical release on October 28, 2017. In 2017, she made her feature film directorial debut with Sun Dogs, starring Michael Angarano, Melissa Benoist, and Allison Janney. In June 2019, Morrison was confirmed to join the cast of This Is Us in a recurring role for the fourth season as Cassidy Sharp, an alcoholic and Marine veteran grappling with her return to civilian life. She returned to guest star in season 5 and 6.

== Personal life ==
In 2004, Morrison began dating Australian actor Jesse Spencer, her co-star in House. They were engaged in December 2006, but called it off in August 2007. Morrison dated Puerto Rican actor Amaury Nolasco from 2009 to 2012.

She has been in a relationship with Salvadoran-American actor Gerardo Celasco since 2019. In April 2022, Morrison began referring to Celasco as her husband. In June 2024, Morrison confirmed that she is mother to a girl.

== Filmography ==
=== Film ===
Year	Title	Role	Notes
1994	Intersection	Meaghan Eastman	
1994	Miracle on 34th Street	Denice	
1999	Stir of Echoes	Samantha Kozac	
2000	Urban Legends: Final Cut	Amy Mayfield	
2001	The Zeros	Joyce	
2002	Design	Sonya Mallow	
2002	Nantucket	Alicia	
2002	Big Shot: Confessions of a Campus Bookie	Callie	Television film
2002	100 Women	Annie	
2003	Grind	Jamie	
2004	Mall Cop	Chris	
2004	The Sure Hand of God	Lily Bowser	
2004	Surviving Christmas	Missy Vanglider	
2004	Lift	Sarah	Short film
2005	Mr. & Mrs. Smith	Jade	
2006	The Script	Christie	Short film
2006	Flourish	Gabrielle Winters	Producer
2007	Big Stan	Mindy	
2007	The Murder of Princess Diana	Rachel Visco	Television film Nominated - Online Film & Television Association Award for Best Actress in a Motion Picture or Miniseries
2009	Star Trek	Winona Kirk	Boston Society of Film Critics Award for Best Ensemble Cast
2009	Table for Three	Leslie Green	
2011	Bringing Ashley Home	Ashley Phillips	Television film Prism Award for Performance in a TV Movie or Miniseries
2011	Five	Sheila	Television film; segment: "Charlotte"
2011	Warrior	Tess Conlon	
2012	Stars in Shorts	Agent Rachel Mintz	Segment: "Prodigal"
2012	Knife Fight	Angela	
2013	Some Girl(s)	Sam	
2013	Alpha Alert	Lt. White	
2013	Star Trek Into Darkness	Winona Kirk (voice)	
2015	To Dust Return	Sharon Reynolds	Short film
2015	Mattresside	Angelica	Short film
2016	The Darkness	Joy Carter	
2016	Albion: The Enchanted Stallion	The Abbess	
2017	Amityville: The Awakening	Candice	
2017	Sun Dogs	Marie	Director, producer Mammoth Film Festival Award for Best Picture; Mammoth Film Festival Award for Grand Jury Award; Savannah Film Festival Award for Best Narrative Feature
2018	Assassination Nation	Margie Duncan	
2018	Back Roads	Callie Mercer	
2018	Alex & the List	Katherine Stern	Burbank International Film Festival Award for Best Actress
2018	Superfly	Detective Mason	
2019	The Report	Caroline Krass	
2019	Batman: Hush	Selina Kyle / Catwoman (voice)	
2019	All Creatures Here Below	Penny	
2019	Bombshell	Juliet Huddy	

=== Television ===
Year	Title	Role	Notes
2001	The Chronicle	Gwen	Episode: "Let Sleeping Dogs Fry"
2001	Touched by an Angel	Melissa	Episode: "Most Likely to Succeed"
2001–2002	Dawson's Creek	Melanie Shay Thompson	2 episodes
2002	Any Day Now	Mandy Singer	Episode: "In Too Deep"
2002	The Random Years	Megan	Episode: "Pilot"
2004–2012	House	Dr. Allison Cameron	Main role (Season 1–6); Guest star (Season 8); Nominated – Screen Actors Guild Award for Outstanding Performance by an Ensemble in a Drama Series (2009)
2009	The Super Hero Squad Show	Wasp	3 episodes; voice role
2010	Chase	Faith Maples	Episode: "Paranoia"
2010–2014	How I Met Your Mother	Zoey Pierson	13 episodes
2011–2018	Once Upon a Time	Emma Swan	Leading role (Season 1–6); Special guest star (Season 7); Nominated - People's Choice Award for Favorite On-Screen Chemistry (shared with Colin O'Donoghue) (2014); Nominated - Nickelodeon Kid's Choice Award for Favorite TV Actress (2015); Nominated - People's Choice Award for Favorite Sci-Fi/Fantasy TV Actress (2015–2017); Nominated – Nickelodeon Kid's Choice Award for Favorite Family TV Actress (2016); Nominated – Teen Choice Award for Choice TV Actress, Sci-Fi/Fantasy (2015, 2017); Nominated – Teen Choice Award for Choice TV Liplock (shared with Colin O'Donoghue) (2015–2017)
2019–2022	This Is Us	Cassidy Sharp	Recurring role (Season 4, 6); Guest role (Season 5)
2023	Will Trent	Abigail Bentley-Campano	2 episodes
2024	Tracker	Lizzy Hawking	Episode: "The Storm"
2025	All’s Fair	Willow Fallow	Episode: “This Is Me Trying”
2026	The Night Agent	Jenny Hagan	Main role (Season 3)

=== Director ===
Year	Title	Notes
2017	Warning Labels	Short; Nominated - Tribeca Film Festival Award for Best Narrative Short
2017	Sun Dogs	Director, producer, actress Won - Mammoth Film Festival Award for Best Picture; Won - Mammoth Film Festival Award for Grand Jury Award; Won - Savannah Film Festival Award for Best Narrative Feature
2018	Fabled	TV series
2019	Euphoria	Episode: "'03 Bonnie and Clyde"
2021	One of Us Is Lying	Episode: "Pilot"
2021–2023	Dr. Death	Episodes: "Dock Ellis", "An Occurrence at Randall Kirby's Sink", "Like Magic", "Worth The Risk", "The Horizon"
2021	Joe Pickett	Episodes: "Shoot, Shovel and Shut Up", "The Most Hated Man in 12 Sleeps"
2022	Surface	Episode: "It Was Always Going to End This Way"
2023	Grease: Rise of the Pink Ladies	Episode: "You Can't Just Walk Out of a Drive-In"
2024	Tracker	Episode: "Trust Fall"
2025	Yellowjackets	Episodes: "12 Angry Girls and 1 Drunk Travis", "Croak"
2026	The Five-Star Weekend	4 episodes

=== Music videos ===
Year	Title	Artist	Notes
2002	"Too Bad About Your Girl"	The Donnas	
2003	"Shut Up"	Nick Lachey	
2015	"What I Want"	Will Butler	
2015	"Demon Days (Do It All Again)"	Wild Wild Horses	Also director

=== Theatre ===
Year	Title	Role	Venue
2010	The Miracle Worker	Kate Keller	Circle in the Square Theatre
2017	The End of Longing	Stephanie	Lucille Lortel Theatre
2024	The Penelopiad	Penelope	Goodman Theatre
