= Wedding Night – End of the Song =

1991 film

Wedding Night - End of the Song
- Directed by: Pol Cruchten
- Written by: Pol Cruchten; Marc Giraud
- Produced by: Jeannot Theis
- Starring: Myriam Muller as Catherine; Thierry van Werveke as Christian; Ender Frings as Tony; Paul Scheuer as Catherine's Father; Marja-Leena Junker as Catherine's Mother; Marie-Paule von Roesgen as Christian's Mother
- Cinematography: Daniel Barrau
- Edited by: Marie Robert
- Music by: André Mergenthaler
- Release date: 6 December 1991
- Running time: 108 minutes
- Country: Luxembourg
- Language: Luxembourgish

Wedding Night – End of the Song (Luxembourgish: Hochzäitsnuecht) is a 1991 Luxembourgish drama film directed by Pol Cruchten. It was screened in the Un Certain Regard section at the 1992 Cannes Film Festival.

== Cast ==
In alphabetical order

- Peter Cooper
- Pol Cruchten
- Ender Frings - Tony
- Sylvie Gales
- Daisy Garand
- Danièle Gaspard
- Emma Grenier
- Joseph Gudenburg
- Patrick Hastert
- Pol Hoffmann
- Marja-Leena Junker - Catherine's mother
- Sofie Knyff
- Jean-Paul Maes
- André Mergenthaler
- Domenico Miccolis
- Myriam Muller - Catherine
- Paul Scheuer - Catherine's father
- Isabelle Thill
- Guido Tomassini
- Thierry van Werveke - Christian
- Marie-Paule von Roesgen - Christian's mother
