= The Murder of Princess Diana (book) =

Book by Noel Botham

- First edition
- Author: Noel Botham
- Language: English
- Subject: Death of Diana, Princess of Wales; Death of Diana, Princess of Wales conspiracy theories
- Published: London
- Publisher: Pinnacle Books
- Publication date: 2004
- ISBN: 9781843581635

The Murder of Princess Diana is a 2004 book by British journalist Noel Botham that disputes the official account that the death of Diana, Princess of Wales was an accident. The publisher claims the book "firmly lays to rest the theory that Diana's death was mere accident, and finally gives the people of Britain the explanation they deserve." The book was reissued for the 20th anniversary of Diana's death in 2017.

== Background and synopsis ==
Botham, a newspaper journalist, attempts to put forward an alternative version of the events surrounding Diana's death, reportedly citing intelligence and royal sources. Botham alleges that Diana was, as she herself predicted, the "victim of a professional hit squad".

== Reception ==
A fictionalised television adaption of the book, The Murder of Princess Diana was released in 2007.
