= The Murder of Princess Diana =

- Written by: Reg Gadney and Emma Reeves
- Directed by: John Strickland
- Starring: Jennifer Morrison; Grégori Derangère; Kevin McNally; François Marthouret; Lucien Jean-Baptiste; Myriam Muller; Raymond Coulthard; Denis Braccini; Nathalie Brocker
- Country of origin: United States
- Original language: English

Production
- Running time: 120 minutes
- Production companies: Delux Productions; Lifetime Television; Working Title Television

Original release
- Network: Lifetime
- Release: August 25, 2007

The Murder of Princess Diana is a 2007 Lifetime movie, directed by John Strickland and starring Jennifer Morrison as an American reporter. The film was based on the book by Noel Botham. Reg Gadney and Emma Reeves wrote the teleplay.

== Cast ==
- Jennifer Morrison as Rachel Visco
- Grégori Derangère as Thomas Sylvestre
- Kevin McNally as Charles Davis
- François Marthouret as Bertrand
- Lucien Jean-Baptiste as Martin
- Myriam Muller: Lucille Lechaim
- Raymond Coulthard as Anthony
- Denis Braccini as Henri Paul
- Nathalie Brocker as Princess Diana

== Reception ==
A review by Mike Hale in The New York Times described it as being "a compendium of Diana conspiracy theories" and "an uneasy combination of crime thriller, romantic melodrama and snuff film, it doesn’t ask us to suspend our disbelief so much as overcome our gag reflex". Barry Garron of the Associated Press previewed the film: "Although filmed on location, the production values are about what you might expect from a film school project".
