= Noel Botham =

British journalist (1940–2012)

Noel Botham (23 January 1940 – 23 November 2012) was a British tabloid journalist and prolific author.

He wrote books on the love-life of Princess Margaret (Margaret: The Untold Story and Margaret: The Last Real Princess) and the death of Diana, Princess of Wales (The Murder of Princess Diana), as well a series of books of obscure facts with the theme of "Useless Information", some of which was wildly erroneous; for example, "It would take 150 million years to drive a car to the sun" in The Totally Awesome Book of Useless Information. Also noted as a raconteur and publican, for many years he ran one of Soho's landmark pubs, The French House.

== Career ==
Botham was educated at Dulwich College and apprenticed on The Croydon Advertiser, then became the foreign editor for the Daily Sketch at the age of 21. He went on to work for many tabloids, including the News of the World where he was chief investigative reporter for a period. Later, he became European editor of the National Enquirer.

In 1997, at the funeral of television presenter Hughie Green, Botham revealed that Green was the biological father of entertainer Paula Yates. Selling that information to the press is reported to have earned him £100,000. In 2008, Botham was portrayed by Danny Webb in the BBC Four drama Hughie Green, Most Sincerely.

After his death, The Daily Telegraph referred to Botham as "one of the hard-drinking reporters who made British newspapers the liveliest in the world". Roy Greenslade in The Guardian called him "the epitome of a Fleet Street scandal-monger and happy to be regarded as such".

== Books ==
His book about Princess Margaret, Margaret: The Untold Story (1994) he published her love-letters to Robin Douglas-Home, the pianist and nephew of Sir Alec Douglas-Home, the former prime minister. These also appeared in the News of the World.

Botham's book, The Murder of Princess Diana (2004) disputed the official version of events. According to the book, the Princess was the victim of the military–industrial complex concerned about their profits because of her involvement in the campaign against landmines. The book was later adapted into the Lifetime Television production, The Murder of Princess Diana.

In addition to his many published biographies and books of trivia, Botham wrote Catch That Tiger (2012), about Major Douglas Lidderdale's capture of an Afrika Korps Tiger Tank in 1943. The book became "something of a bestseller".
