= Jesse Spencer =

Australian-American actor and musician (born 1979)

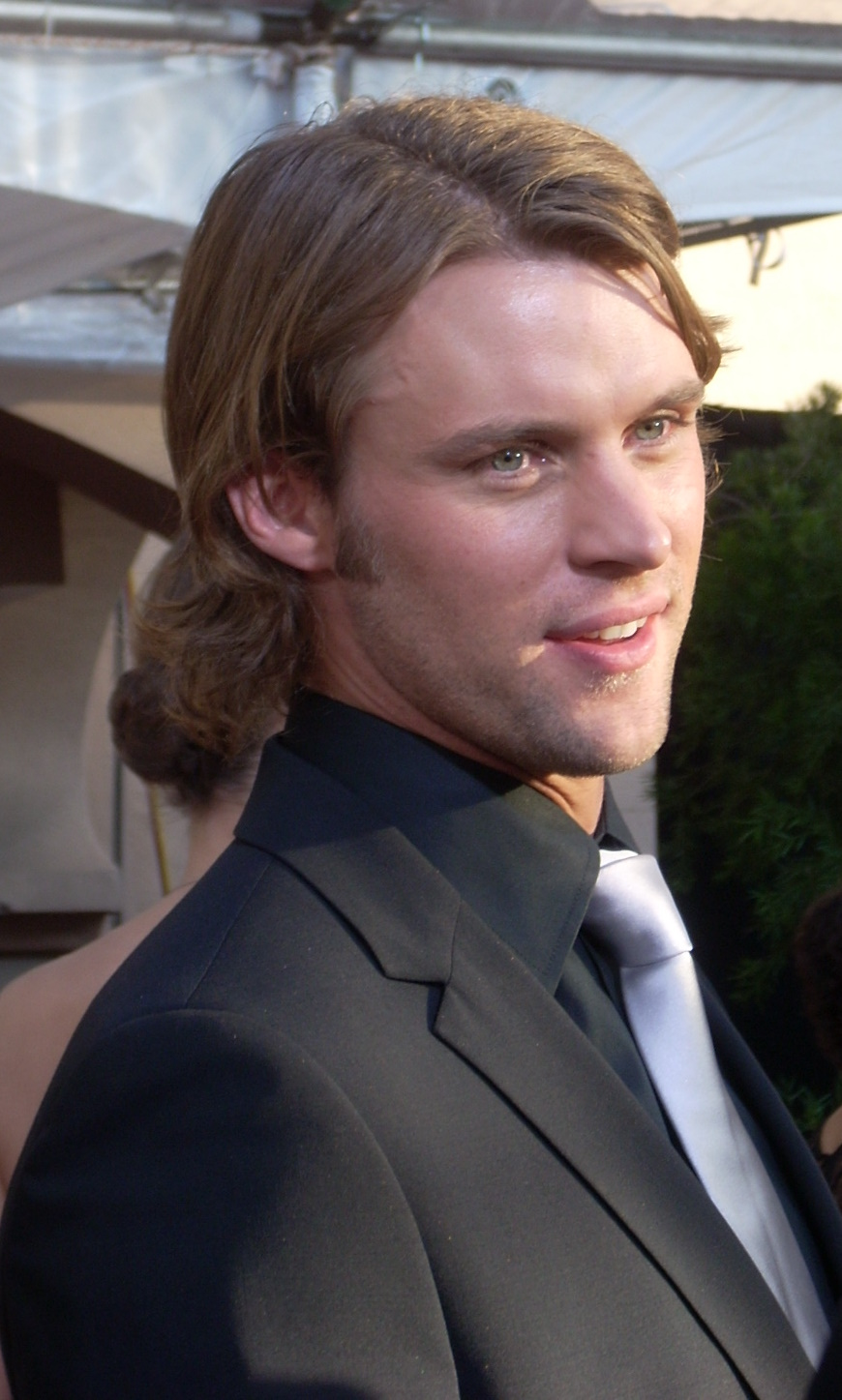
- Spencer in 2009
- Born: 12 February 1979 (age 47); Melbourne, Australia
- Citizenship: Australia; United States
- Occupations: Actor; musician
- Years active: 1991–present
- Spouse: Kali Woodruff Carr (m. 2020)
- Children: 1

Jesse Gordon Spencer (born 12 February 1979) is an Australian-American actor and musician. He is known for his roles as Billy Kennedy on the Australian soap opera Neighbours (1994–2000, 2005, 2022), for which he was nominated for two Logie Awards, Dr. Robert Chase on the American medical drama House (2004–2012) and Captain Matthew Casey on the American drama Chicago Fire (2012–2024).

== Early life ==
Jesse Gordon Spencer was born in Melbourne on 12 February 1979, the son of Robyn and radiologist Rodney Spencer. His parents were the founders of the Australians Against Further Immigration party and later contested the 1998 Australian federal election for Pauline Hanson's One Nation party.

Spencer attended Canterbury Primary School, Malvern Central School and Scotch College. While there, he auditioned for the long-running soap opera Neighbours. He completed his VCE and gained a place at Monash University but deferred to pursue acting.

== Career ==
=== Acting ===
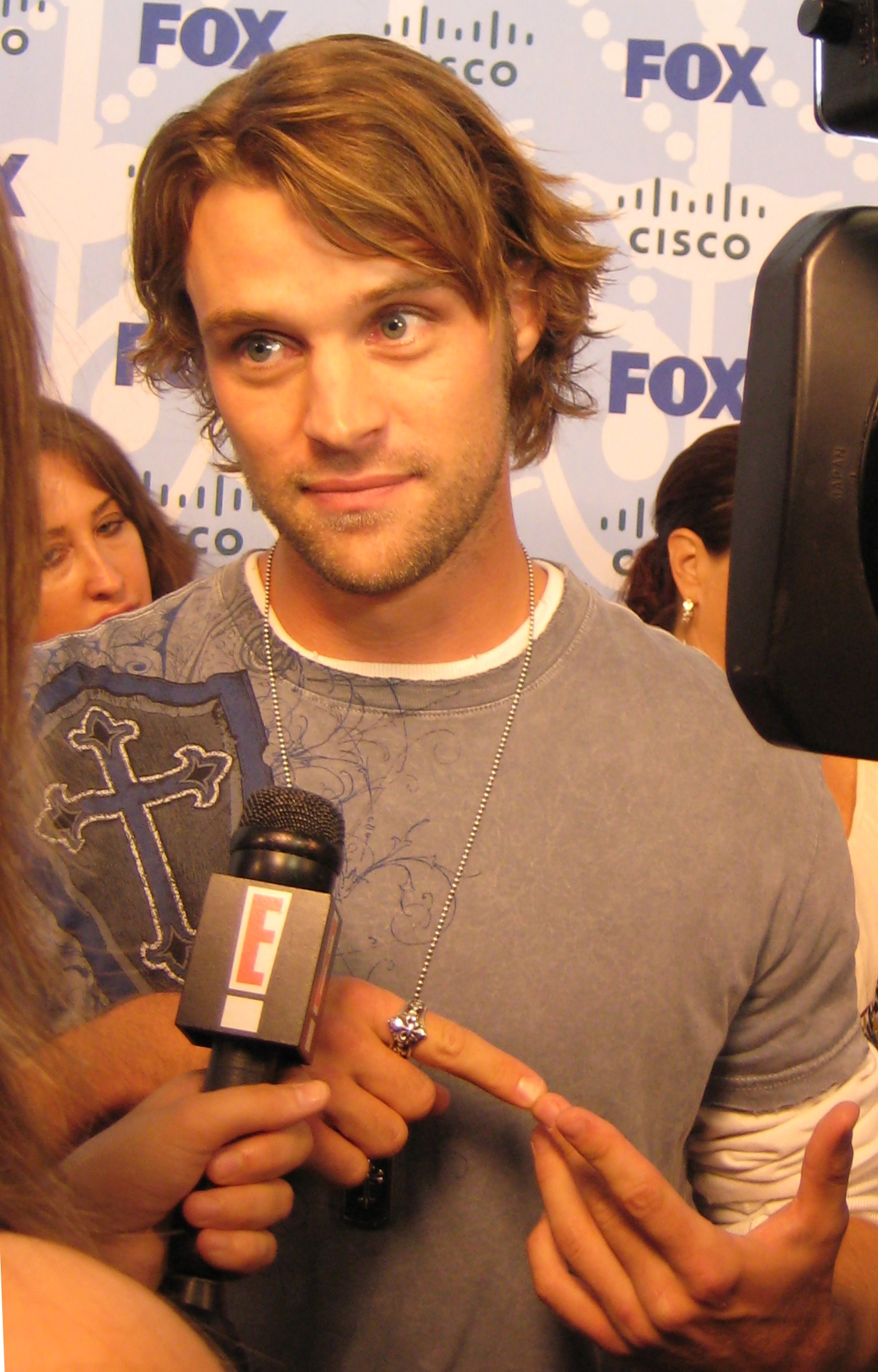
Spencer in 2008

Spencer starred as Billy Kennedy in the Australian soap opera Neighbours from 1994 to 2000. He later reprised his role in 2005, in an episode celebrating the show's 20th anniversary. His character was the son of long-term iconic Ramsay Street residents Dr. Karl Kennedy and Susan Kennedy.

After his time on Neighbours, he co-starred in films such as Winning London with the Olsen twins, Uptown Girls and Swimming Upstream.

Spencer starred as intensive care specialist and surgeon Dr. Robert Chase on the Fox medical drama House from 2004 to 2012. He played Chase for the show's entire run, becoming the second longest-serving member of the title character's team.

Spencer starred as firefighter Captain Matthew Casey in the NBC drama Chicago Fire from 2012 to 2021.

In 2022, it was confirmed that Spencer would return to Neighbours as part of the series finale.

In 2024, Spencer was confirmed as part of the cast for Disney+ series Last Days of the Space Age.

=== Music ===
Spencer began his musical career with the Australian Boys Choir, performing with them from 1986 to 1992. He plays the violin in Band from TV, a group that includes his former House co-star Hugh Laurie. They play at various events, giving the money they earn to charity. The band played on Idol Gives Back in April 2008.

== Personal life ==
Spencer began dating American actress Jennifer Morrison, who played his character's love interest in House, in July 2004; he proposed to her at the Eiffel Tower during Christmas 2006, but they called off their engagement in August 2007. He also dated Brazilian surfer Maya Gabeira from 2010 to 2013.

He began dating neuroscientist Dr. Kali Woodruff Carr in 2014, and they were engaged in 2019. They were married on 27 June 2020. In April 2022, the couple had their first child, a boy.

Spencer became an American citizen in November 2021.

== Recognition ==
For Neighbours, Spencer was nominated for "Most Popular Actor" at the 1998 and 1999 Logie Awards. For House, he was nominated for "Choice TV Breakout Performance – Male" at the 2005 Teen Choice Awards and "Outstanding Performance by an Ensemble in a Drama Series" at the 2008 Screen Actors Guild Awards; he received a "Golden Boomerang" at the 2006 Australians in Film Breakthrough Awards for his work. In 2007, he was included in People Magazine's 100 Most Beautiful People issue. For Chicago Fire, he was again nominated at the 2013 Teen Choice Awards for "Choice TV Actor – Action".

== Filmography ==
=== Film ===
Year	Title	Role	Notes
2000	Lorna Doone	Marwood de Whichehalse	
2001	Curse of the Talisman	Jeremy Campbell	
2001	Winning London	Lord James Browning Jr.	
2002	Stranded	Fritz Robinson	TV film
2003	Swimming Upstream	Tony Fingleton	
2003	Uptown Girls	Neal Fox	
2004	Action Man: Robot Atak	Flynt (voice)	Animated tie-in
2006	Flourish	Eddie Gator	
2006	The Script	Ben	Short film
2010	Tell-Tale	Lover	Short film
2013	Skum Rocks!	David Lockhart	
2015	The Girl Is in Trouble	Nicholas Feinstein	
2021	Queer Fish in God's Waiting Room	Liam	Short film

=== Television ===
Year	Title	Role	Notes
1994	Time Trax	Young Bill	Episode: "A Close Encounter"
1994–2000; 2005; 2022	Neighbours	Billy Kennedy	Main role (1994–2000); guest role (2005, 2022); 471 episodes
1998	Hercules	Triton Jr. (voice)	Episode: "Hercules and the Son of Poseidon"
2002	Saishu Heiki Kanojo	Shuji's Father (voice)	English version; Episode: "Soshite, bokutachi wa koishiteiku"
2003	Death in Holy Orders	Raphael Arbuthnot	2 episodes; TV miniseries
2004–2012	House	Dr. Robert Chase	Main role; 171 episodes
2006	Blue Heelers	Lee Cruickshank	Episode: "Dangerous Animals"
2012–2021	Chicago Fire	Captain Matthew Casey	Lead role (seasons 1–10); guest role (seasons 11–12); 205 episodes
2013	Phineas and Ferb	Liam McCracken (voice)	Episode: "Primal Perry"
2014–2019	Chicago P.D.	Captain Matthew Casey	7 episodes
2017–2019	Chicago Med	Captain Matthew Casey	4 episodes
2024	Last Days of the Space Age	Tony Bissett	8 episodes

=== Music videos ===
Year	Artist	Title	Role
2009	Caitlin Crosby	"Still Have My Heart"	Dentist
2010	Katharine McPhee	"Say Goodbye"	Boyfriend

== Stage ==
Year	Title	Role	Notes
1991	The King and I	Louis	State Theatre
1992	Winnie the Pooh	Christopher Robin	The Alexander Theatre
1993	Scrooge	Older brother of Tiny Tim	The Princess Theatre, Melbourne
1998–1999	Peter Pan	Peter Pan	White Rock Theatre, Hastings
1999–2000	Jack and the Beanstalk	Jack	Wolverhampton Grand Theatre
2003	The Modernists	Terrance	The Crucible Theatre, Sheffield

== Awards and nominations ==
Year	Awards	Category	Work	Results
1999	Silver Logie Awards	Most Popular TV Actor	Neighbours	Won
1998	Silver Logie Awards	Most Popular TV Actor	Neighbours	Nominated
2005	Teen Choice Awards	Choice TV Breakout Performance – Male	House	Nominated
2008	Screen Actors Guild Award	Outstanding Performance by an Ensemble in a Drama Series	House	Nominated
2013	Teen Choice Awards	Choice TV Actor – Action	Chicago Fire	Nominated
