= Personality and image of Elizabeth II =

Public depiction of Queen Elizabeth II of the United Kingdom

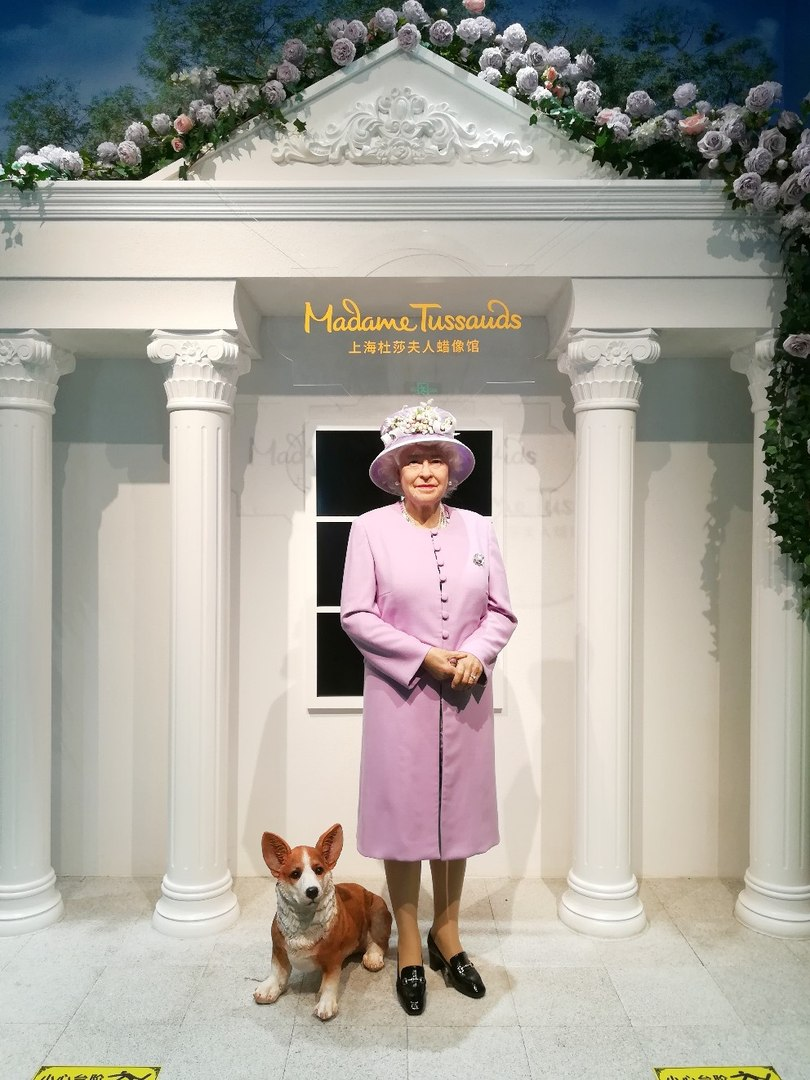
Wax figure at Madame Tussauds in Shanghai, China

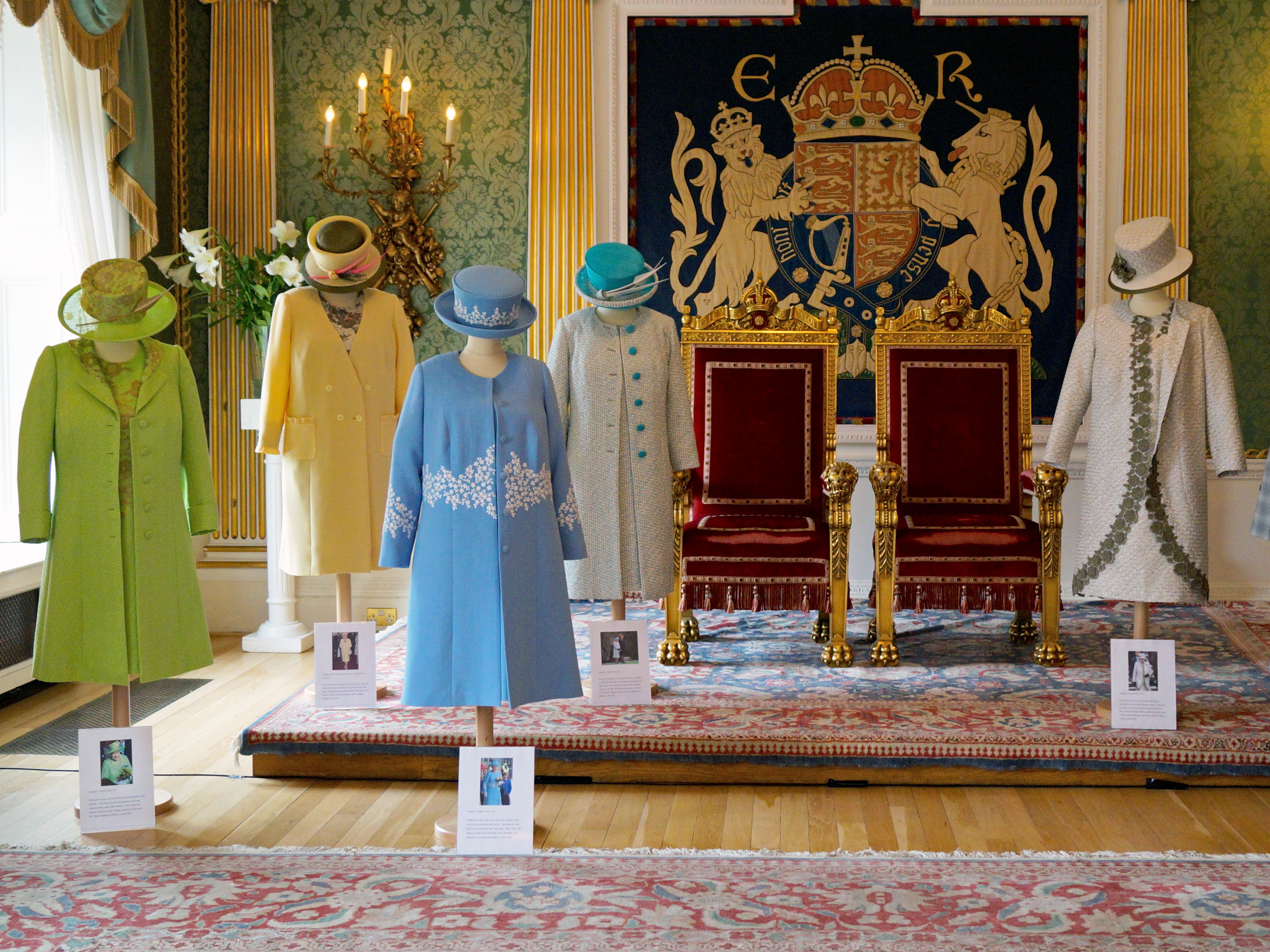
Some of the Queen's outfits on display at Hillsborough Castle in 2013

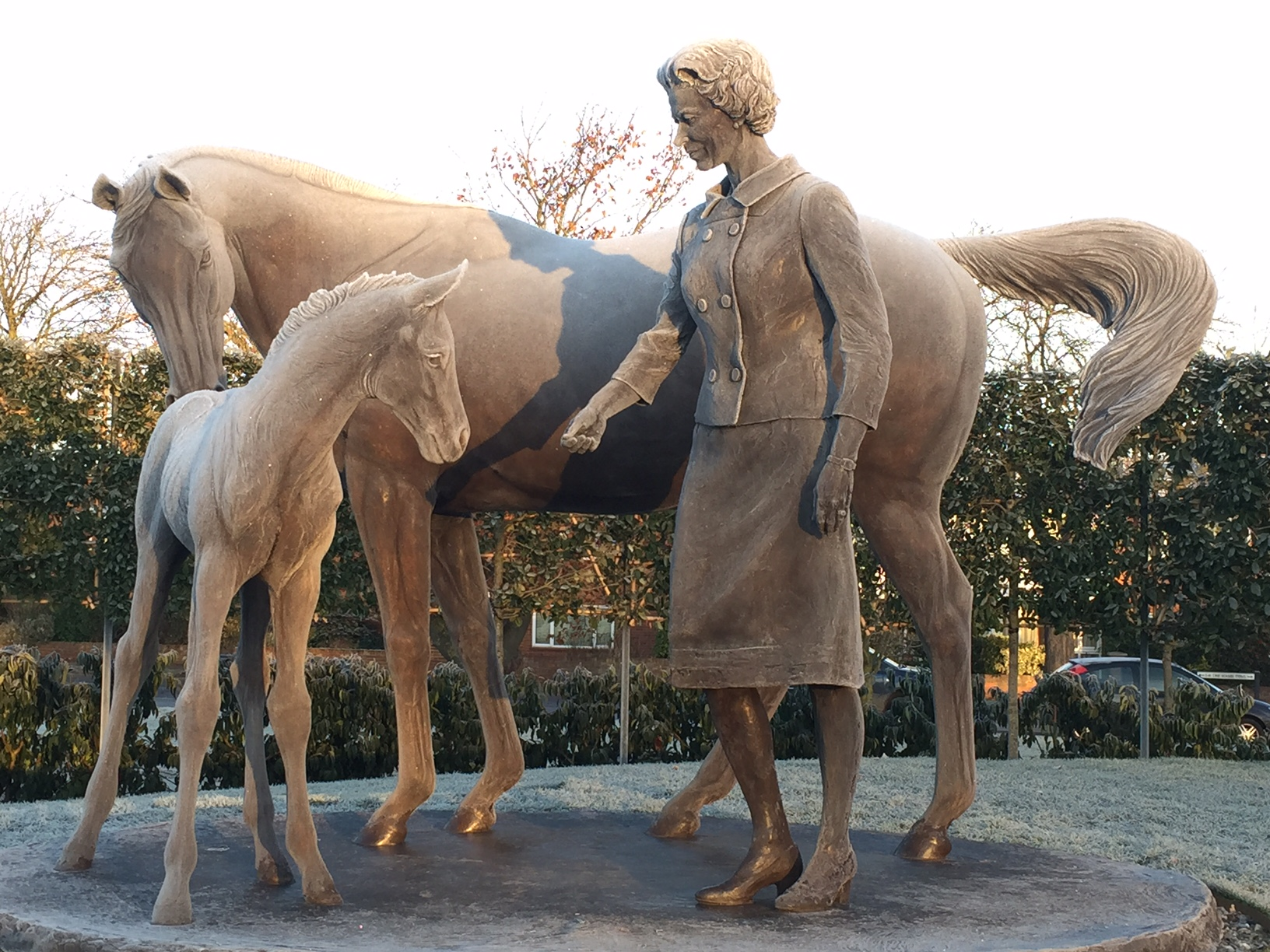
Statue at Newmarket, Suffolk

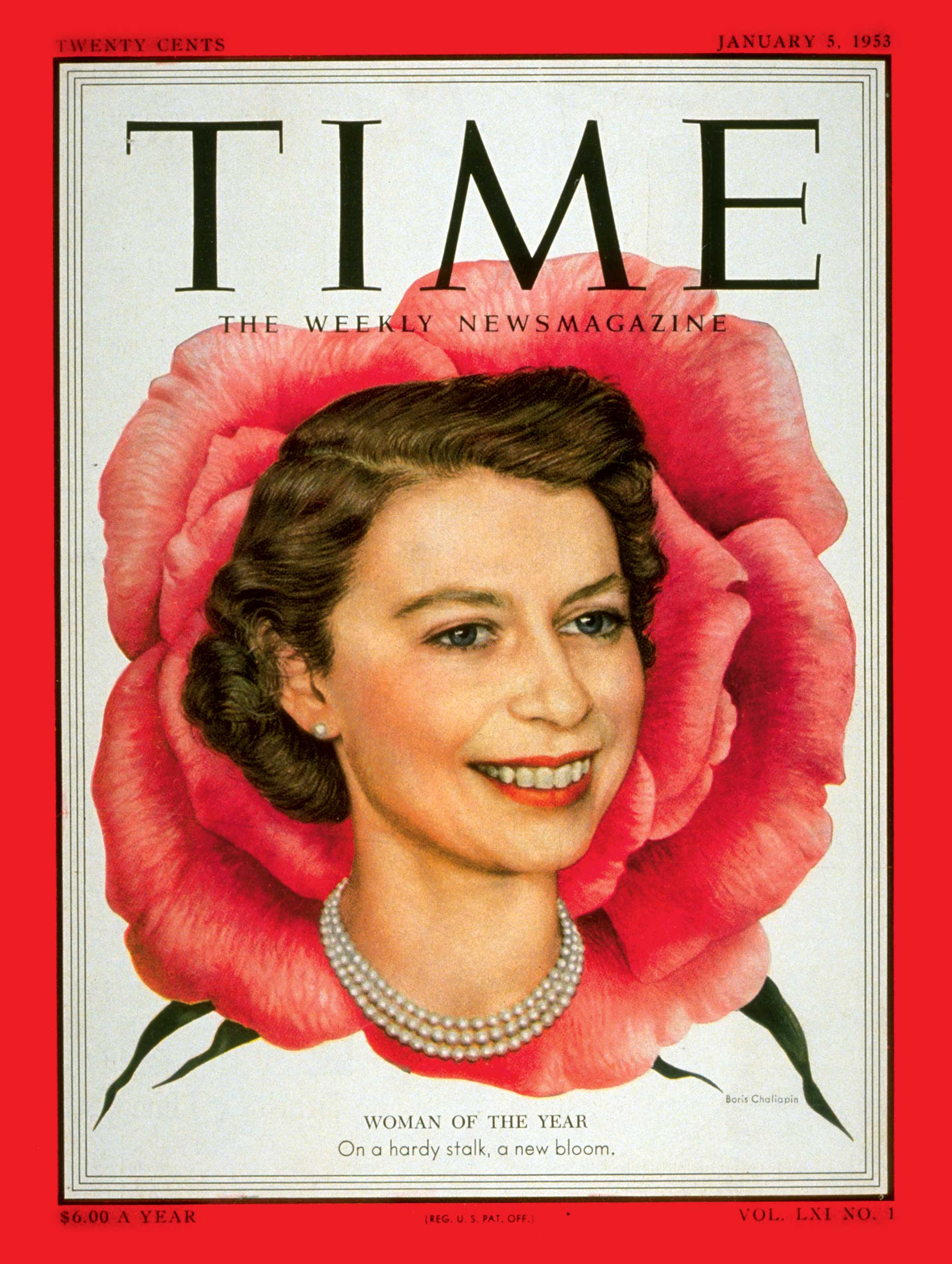
On the cover of Time, 1953

The image of Elizabeth II, Queen of the United Kingdom and Head of the Commonwealth from 1952 to 2022, was widely favourable throughout her years as a reigning monarch. Modest in dress, she was well known for her solid-colour overcoats and matching hats, which allowed her to be seen easily in a crowd. She attended many cultural events as part of her public role. Her main leisure interests included horse racing, photography, and dogs, especially her Pembroke Welsh corgis. She ate jam sandwiches every day since childhood. Some of her other favourite foods were fish and chips, chocolate perfection pie, scones with jam and clotted cream, salmon from the River Dee, and Morecambe Bay potted shrimp. Her views on political issues and other matters were largely subject to conjecture. She never gave a press interview and refrained from discussing her personal opinions publicly.

== Personality ==
Margaret Rhodes speaking about her cousin Queen Elizabeth II, on BBC Radio 4 programme Desert Island Discs, 2012

Much of what is known about Elizabeth's personality and views has been compiled from impressions and descriptions by those whom had met her. Prime Minister of Canada William Lyon Mackenzie King wrote about then-Princess Elizabeth in his diary, after speaking with her at a dinner during the Commonwealth Prime Ministers' Conference in 1944: "She was very natural, not in the least shy."

Canadian politician Michael Ignatieff remarked in 2010, after a private audience with Elizabeth, how he was struck by her "wonderful sense of the absurd" and noted her "sense of humour [...] that sense of comedy of life has survived 60 years of gruelling public life." After a weekend at Balmoral Castle hosted by Elizabeth, Canadian Governor General Michaëlle Jean recounted witnessing a relaxed, informal home life: Elizabeth and her family preparing a meal together—including a salad dressing she had devised—and doing the washing up afterwards. Similarly, Michael Hood, aide-de-camp to Governor General Ray Hnatyshyn, remembered the Queen and her husband driving their guests to picnics on the grounds of Sandringham House and helping serve food and drink.

Lady Pamela Hicks, a cousin of Prince Philip, Duke of Edinburgh, commented on Elizabeth's personality as "individualistic". Hicks's mother remembers back to when King George VI died. Elizabeth was in Kenya with her husband when she found out; "I'm so sorry, but we are going to have to go back to England," she recalled Elizabeth saying.

== Beliefs, activities, and interests ==
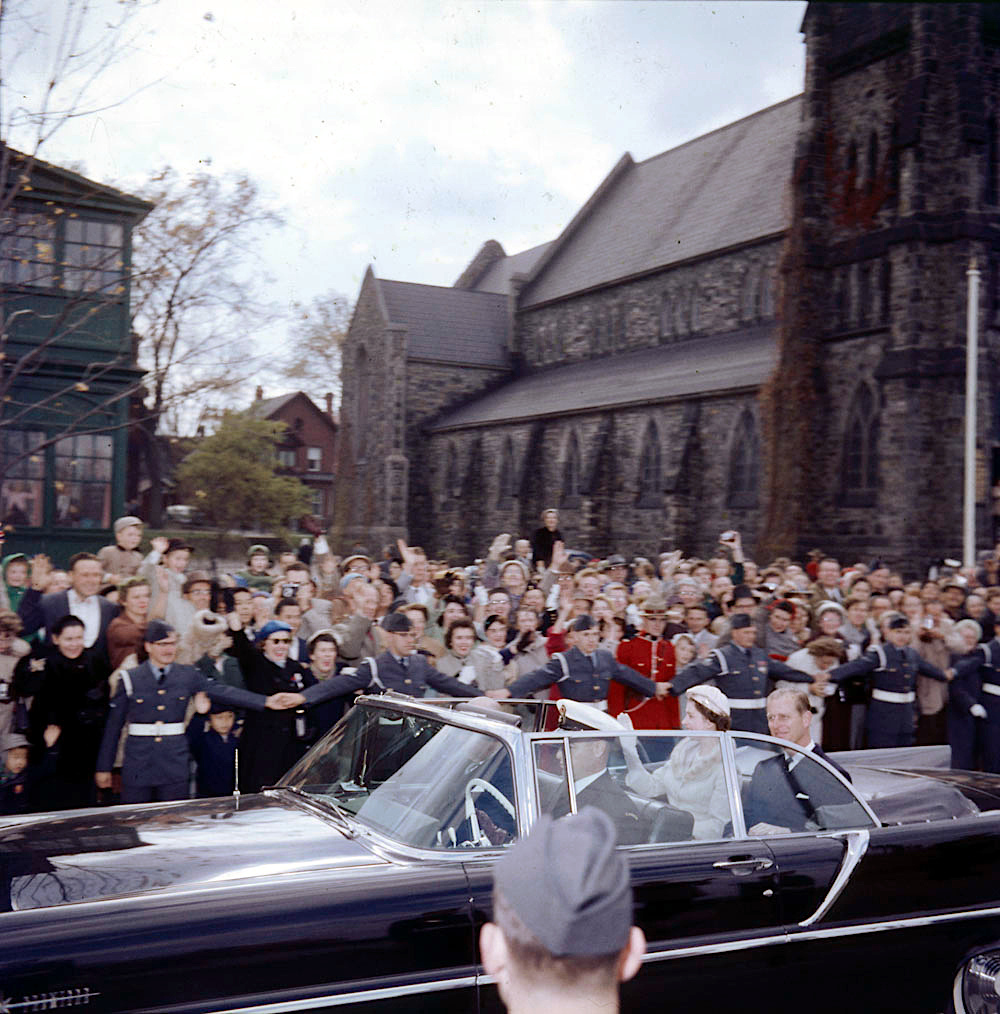
The Queen and the Duke of Edinburgh leaving Christ Church Cathedral, Ottawa after a visit in 1957

Elizabeth had a deep sense of religious and civic duty, and took her Coronation Oath seriously. Aside from her official religious role as Supreme Governor of the established Church of England, she worshipped with that church and also the national Church of Scotland. She demonstrated support for inter-faith relations and met with leaders of other churches and religions, including five popes of the Roman Catholic Church: Pius XII, John XXIII, John Paul II, Benedict XVI and Francis. A personal note about her faith often featured in her annual Christmas Message broadcast to the Commonwealth. In 2000, she said:

To many of us, our beliefs are of fundamental importance. For me the teachings of Christ and my own personal accountability before God provide a framework in which I try to lead my life. I, like so many of you, have drawn great comfort in difficult times from Christ's words and example.

Elizabeth was patron of more than 600 organisations and charities. The Charities Aid Foundation estimated that Elizabeth helped raise over £1.4 billion for her patronages during her reign. Her main leisure interests included equestrianism and dogs, especially her Pembroke Welsh Corgis. Her lifelong love of corgis began in 1933 with Dookie, the first corgi owned by her family.

Despite not being a football fan and instead enjoying horse-racing, Elizabeth stated to the former England men's manager Sven-Göran Eriksson in the past that her favourite player was ex-Liverpool striker Michael Owen.

=== Political views ===
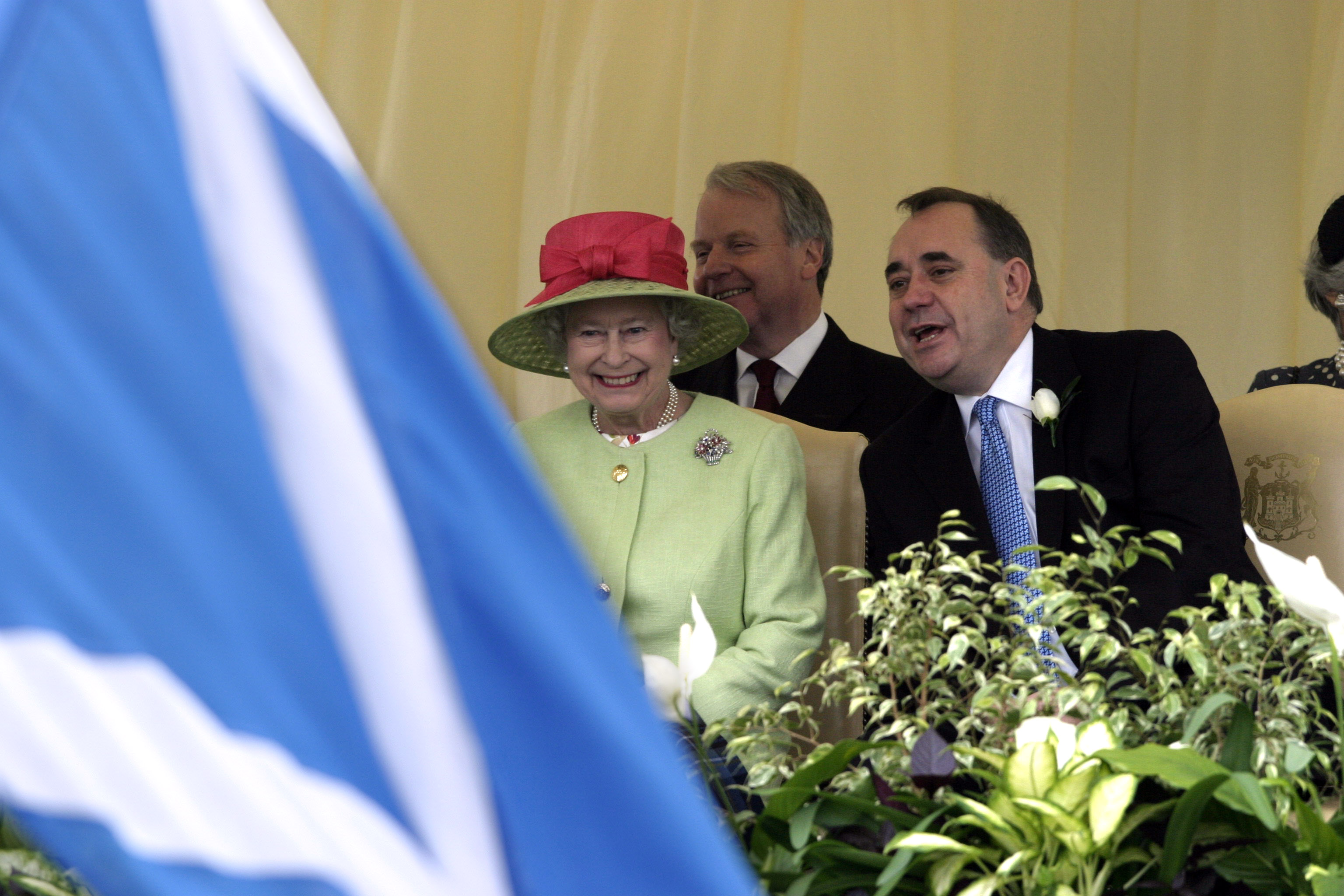
The Queen with Alex Salmond at the 2007 opening of the Scottish Parliament. There have been media reports and comments from politicians that she was privately against the idea of Scottish independence.

Elizabeth did not explicitly express her own political opinions in a public forum, and it is against convention to ask or reveal the monarch's views.

Prime Minister of Canada William Lyon Mackenzie King recorded a meeting with King George VI, on 23 October 1945, at which Princess Elizabeth was present. Mackenzie King wrote in his diary, "some mention was made of [Adolf] Hitler [...] the King said something about it being a pity that Hitler had not been shot. Princess Elizabeth said she would have been prepared to shoot him."

While the Queen never spoke publicly on the matter of apartheid, in 1961, the year in which South Africa held a Whites-only referendum that narrowly rejected the South African monarchy and, along with it, Elizabeth as queen, she was photographed dancing with President of Ghana Kwame Nkrumah at a banquet in Accra celebrating Ghana's establishment as a republic (also removing Elizabeth as head of state) the year before. This act was taken as the Queen's symbolic expression of her anti-apartheid stance; the image offended the white South African government. Former Canadian Prime Minister Brian Mulroney said the Queen had, through the 1980s, sided with the majority of Commonwealth prime ministers, and against her British Prime Minister, Margaret Thatcher, on the matter of imposing sanctions on apartheid South Africa, a point echoed by former Commonwealth Secretary-General Shridath Ramphal, who said, "so steadfast was the Queen to the anti-apartheid cause [...] that, once again, she stood firm against the position of Thatcher."

When The Times journalist Paul Routledge controversially asked Elizabeth for her opinions on the miners' strike of 1984–85, she replied that it was "all about one man", a reference to Arthur Scargill.

Paul Martin Sr., who was in 1981 sent to the UK to discuss the patriation of the Canadian constitution, noted that, during that time, the Queen had taken a great interest in the constitutional debate and he, along with John Roberts and Mark MacGuigan, found the monarch "better informed on both the substance and politics of Canada's constitutional case than any of the British politicians or bureaucrats." After the constitution was patriated to Canada in 1982, with amendments the cabinet of Quebec refused to agree to, the Queen, at a reception at Rideau Hall, privately conveyed to journalists her regret that the province was not part of the settlement. Elizabeth later, on 22 and 23 October 1987, publicly expressed her personal support for the Meech Lake Accord, which attempted to bring Quebec governmental backing to the patriated constitution. She received criticism from opponents of the accord, which failed to attract the unanimous support from all federal and provincial legislators required for it to pass.

Elizabeth was, in October 1995, tricked into a hoax call by Montreal radio host Pierre Brassard impersonating Canadian Prime Minister Jean Chrétien. Elizabeth, who believed that she was speaking to her Prime Minister, said she supported Canadian unity and agreed to make a national, televised statement encouraging such in the days ahead of that year's referendum on Quebec's independence.

Following the 2014 Scottish independence referendum, Prime Minister David Cameron stated that the Queen was pleased with the outcome. She had arguably issued a public coded statement about the referendum by telling one woman outside Balmoral Kirk that she hoped people would think "very carefully" about the outcome. It emerged later that Cameron had specifically requested that she register her concern.

Elizabeth favoured action to mitigate the effects of climate change. She told the 2021 United Nations Climate Change Conference: "None of us will live forever. But we are doing this not for ourselves, but for our children and our children's children, and those who will follow in their footsteps".

According to former Israeli president Reuven Rivlin, Elizabeth believed that every Israeli was "either a terrorist or son of a terrorist" and she always refused to let Israeli officials step into Buckingham Palace.

== Public image ==
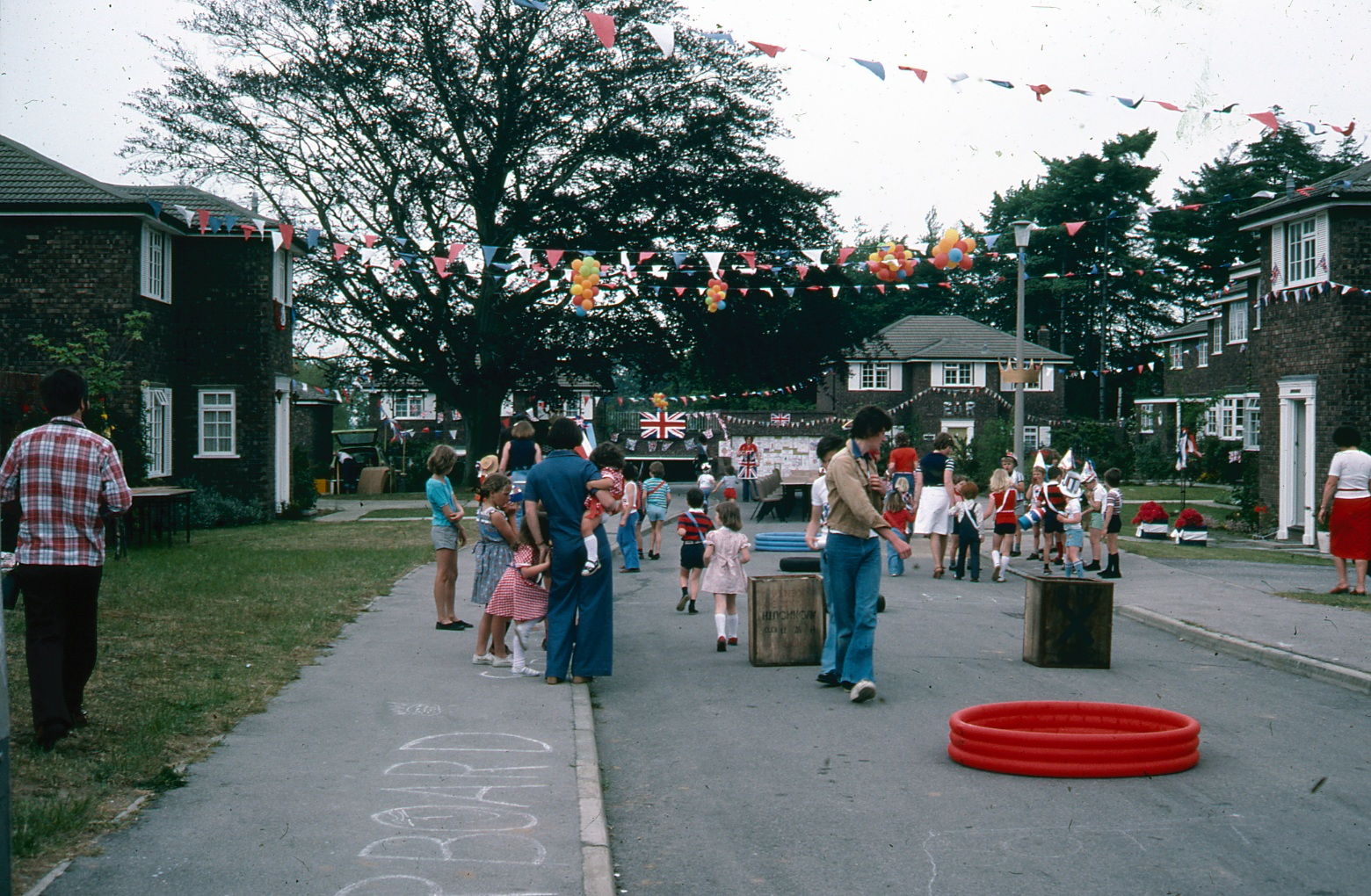
Street Party for the Queen's Silver Jubillee in Lynwood Chase, Bracknell, Berkshire

At Elizabeth's Silver Jubilee in 1977, the crowds and celebrations were genuinely enthusiastic; however there was a significant shift over the next twenty years with her popularity sinking to a low point in the 1990s. Under pressure from public opinion, she began to pay income tax for the first time, and Buckingham Palace was opened to the public. Although support for republicanism in Britain seemed higher than at any time in living memory, republican ideology was still a minority viewpoint and Elizabeth herself had high approval ratings. Criticism was focused on the institution of the monarchy itself, and the conduct of Elizabeth's wider family, rather than her own behaviour and actions. Discontent with the monarchy reached its peak on the death of Diana, Princess of Wales, although Elizabeth's personal popularity—as well as general support for the monarchy—rebounded after her live television broadcast to the world five days after Diana's death. In 2002, Elizabeth was ranked 24th in the 100 Greatest Britons poll.

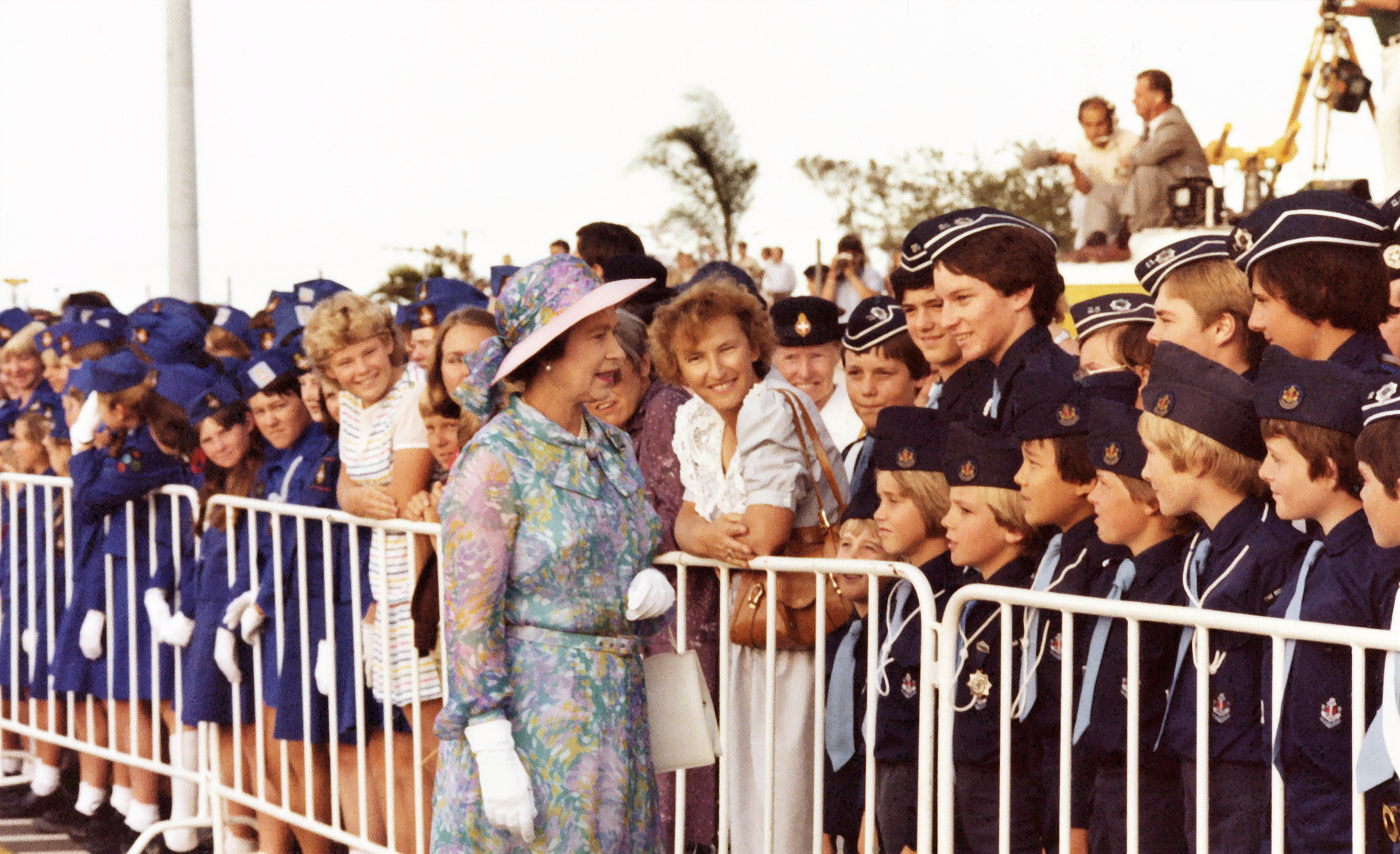
Meeting children in Brisbane, Australia, October 1982

In November 1999, a referendum in Australia on the future of the Australian monarchy favoured its retention in preference to an indirectly elected head of state. Many republicans credited Elizabeth's personal popularity with the survival of the monarchy in Australia. In 2010, Prime Minister Julia Gillard noted that there was a "deep affection" for Elizabeth in Australia and another referendum on the monarchy should wait until after her reign. Gillard's successor, Malcolm Turnbull, who led the republican campaign in 1999, similarly believed that Australians would not vote to become a republic in her lifetime. "She's been an extraordinary head of state", Turnbull said in 2021, "and I think frankly, in Australia, there are more Elizabethans than there are monarchists". Similarly, referendums in both Tuvalu in 2008 and Saint Vincent and the Grenadines in 2009 saw voters reject proposals to become republics.

Opinion polls suggested that Queen Elizabeth II had a strong approval rating even in the 1990s which improved in the early years of the 21st century; coinciding with her Diamond Jubilee, the Queen had an approval rate in the United Kingdom of 90% in 2012. According to a YouGov poll in January 2014, Elizabeth was the most admired person in the United Kingdom with 18.74% of respondents reporting that she was the person they most admired, the highest percentage of all candidates. Internationally she was the 17th most-admired person in the world.

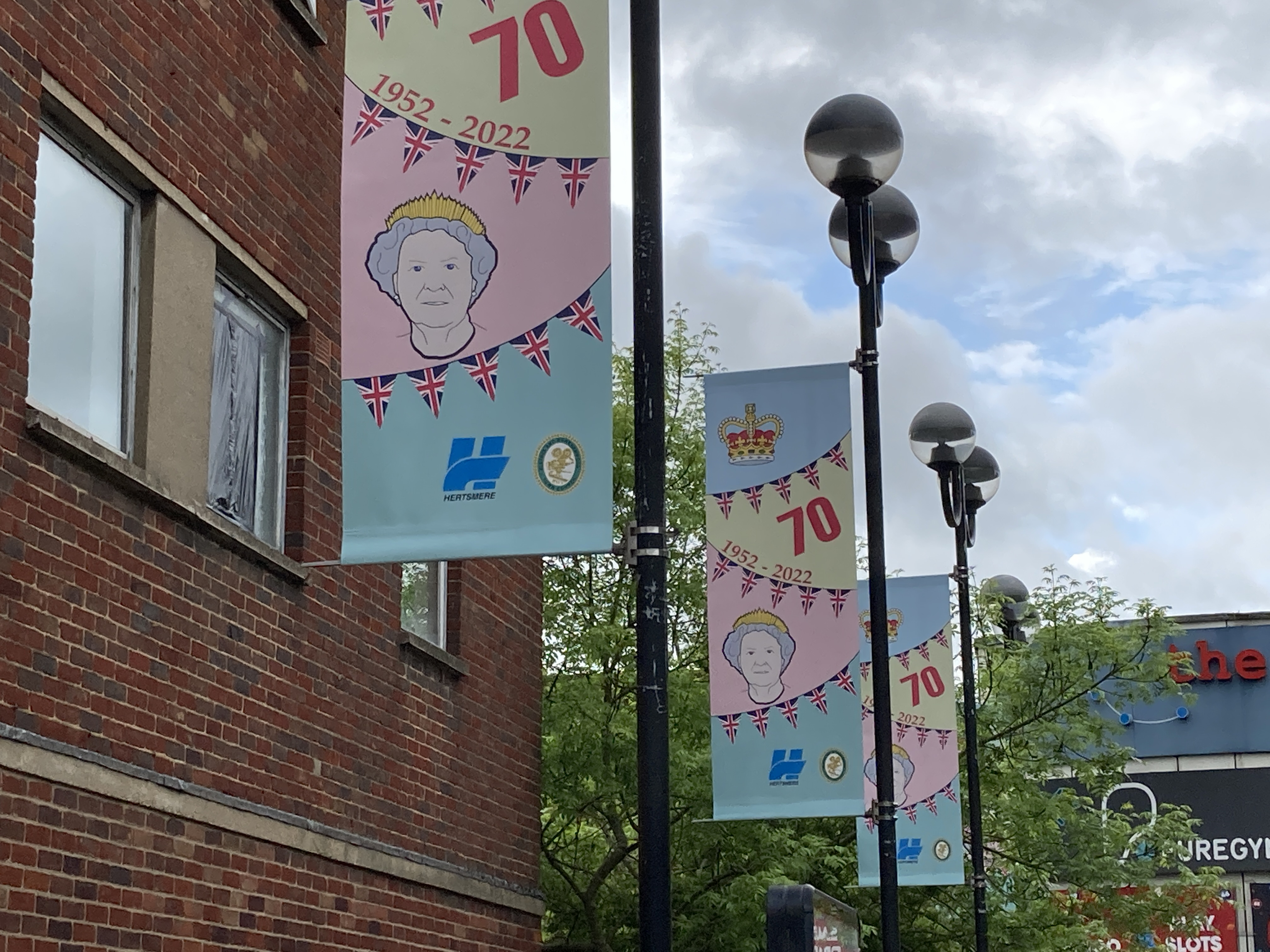
Banners marking the Queen's platinum Jubillee in Borehamwood, Hertfordshire

Elizabeth's public image had noticeably softened in the years prior to her death; as although she remained reserved in public, she had been seen laughing and smiling much more than in years past, and shed tears during emotional occasions such as at Remembrance Day services. Henry Ward described his 2016 portrait of the Queen as portraying "a queen of warmth but also of reserve". Whilst not as universal as it once was, various polling suggested the popularity of the monarchy remained high in Great Britain during the Platinum Jubilee in 2022, with Elizabeth's personal popularity remaining particularly strong. As of 2021, she remained the third most admired woman in the world according to the annual Gallup poll, her 52 appearances on the list meaning she had been in the top ten more than any other woman in the poll's history.

== Personality in diplomacy matters ==
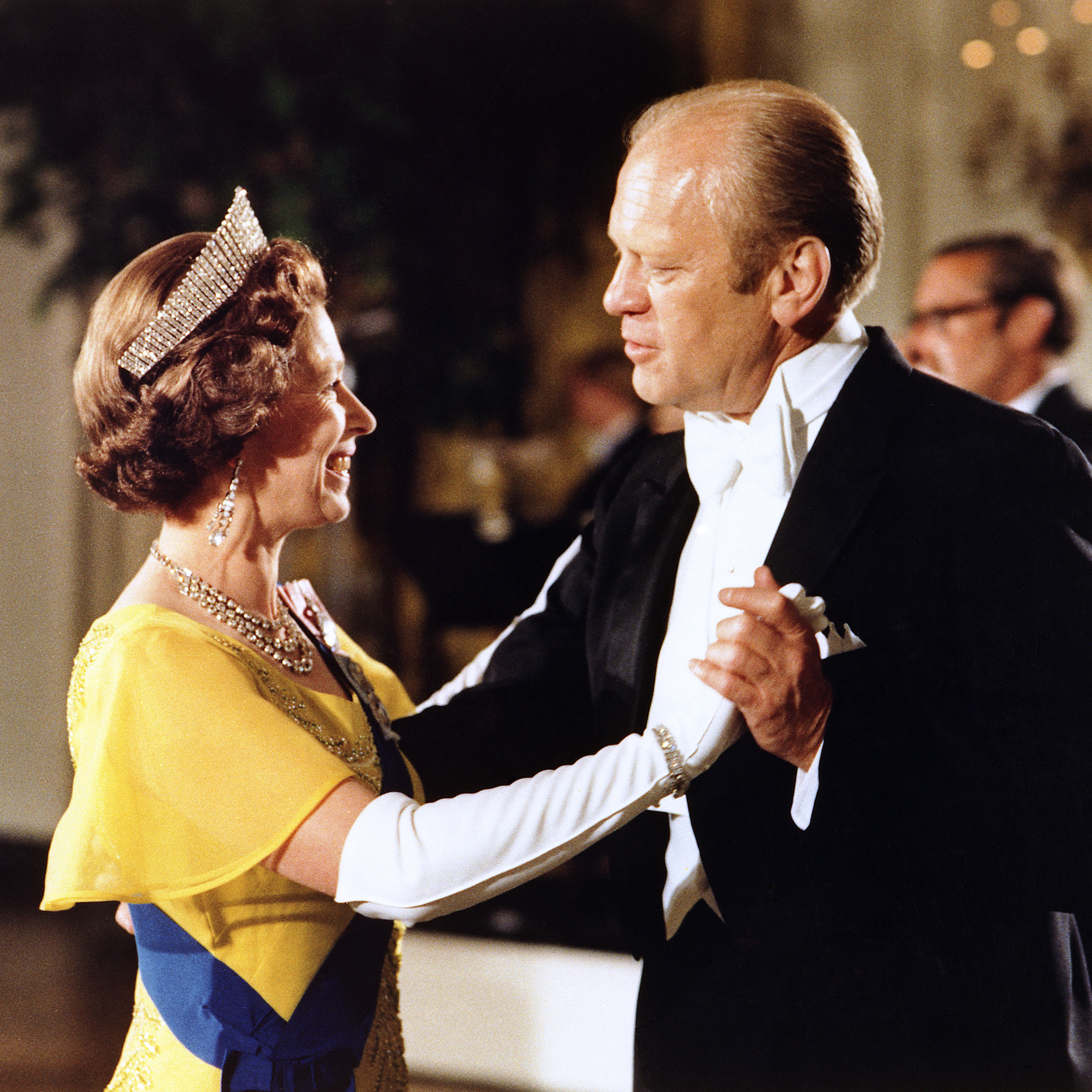
United States President Gerald Ford and Queen Elizabeth II dance during the state dinner in honour of the Queen and Prince Philip at the White House, 17 July 1976

In matters of diplomacy, Elizabeth was known to be quite formal, and royal protocol is generally very strict. Though some of the traditional rules for dealing with the monarch were relaxed during her reign (bowing was no longer required, for example, although it is still frequently performed), other forms of close personal interaction, such as touching, are discouraged by officials. At least six people are known to have broken this rule, the first being a woman named Alice Frazier, who hugged the Queen in 1991 when Elizabeth visited her residence in a government housing project in Washington, D.C. (accompanied by First Lady Barbara Bush and Secretary of Housing and Urban Development Jack Kemp). The second was Paul Keating, Prime Minister of Australia, when he was photographed with his arm around Elizabeth in 1992. The third was Canadian cyclist Louis Garneau, who did the same thing ten years later when posing for a photograph with Elizabeth at Rideau Hall (her official residence in Canada). In 2009, Elizabeth initiated an affectionate gesture with First Lady Michelle Obama at a palace reception she attended with President Obama. The Queen rested her hand briefly at the small of the First Lady's back, a gesture that Mrs Obama returned. It was remarked at the time as unprecedented and described afterwards by a palace spokeswoman as "a mutual and spontaneous display of affection and appreciation between The Queen and Michelle Obama."

Elizabeth's subtle uses of signals to her staff in certain social situations has been described by journalist Hugo Vickers and others. It is said that by twisting her wedding ring she would signal that she was ready for the conversation or event to end forthwith. Alternately, placing her handbag onto the table at dinner meant that she wanted the event to end within the next five minutes and by setting it on the floor she indicated that she was not enjoying the conversation and wanted a lady-in-waiting to assist immediately.

== Media perception ==
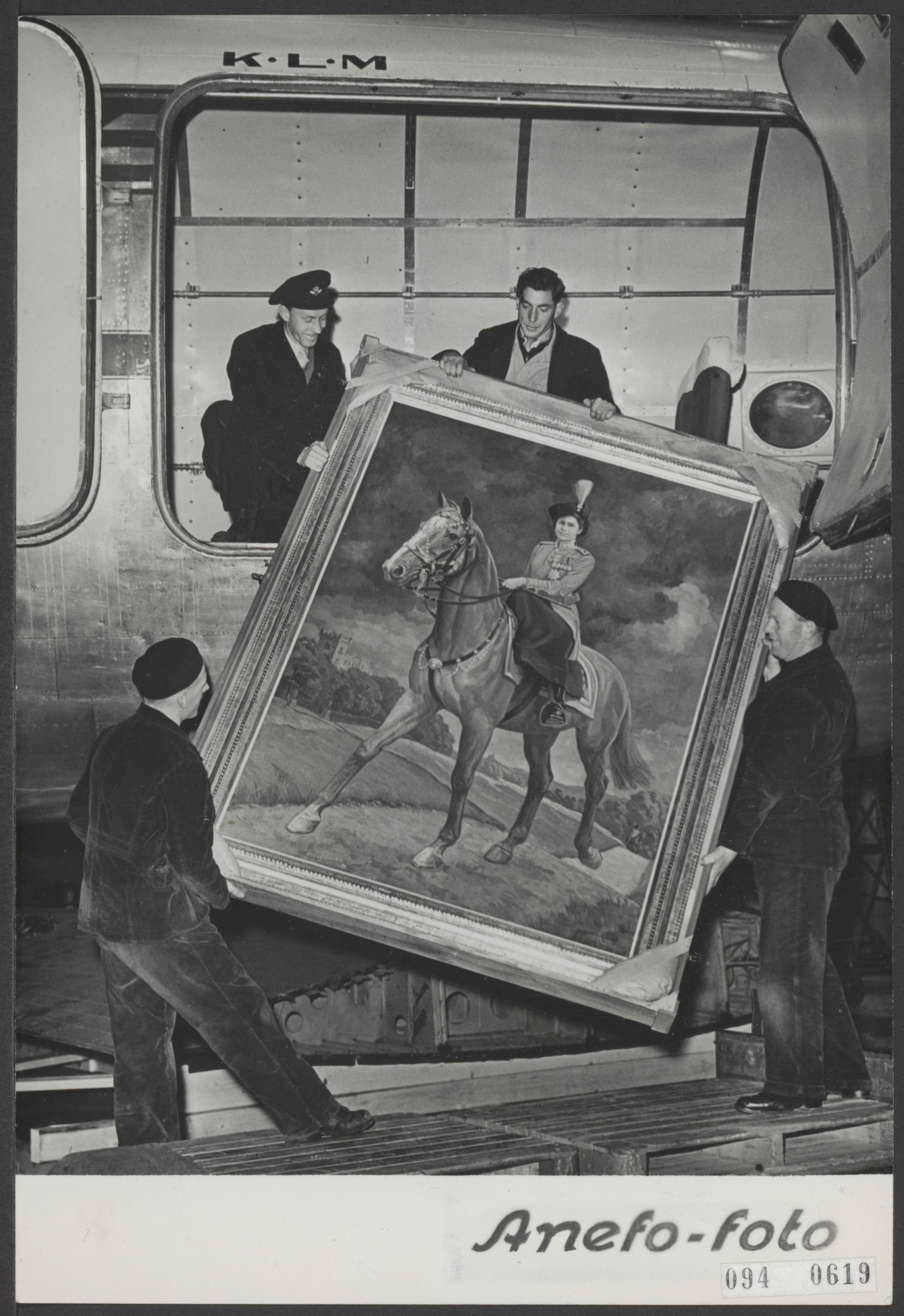
A portrait of Elizabeth painted in the Netherlands in the first year of her reign is transported to London

In the 1950s, as a young woman at the start of her reign, Elizabeth was depicted as a glamorous "fairytale Queen". After the trauma of the Second World War, it was a time of hope, a period of progress and achievement heralding a "new Elizabethan age". Lord Altrincham's accusation in 1957 that her speeches sounded like those of a "priggish schoolgirl" was an extremely rare criticism. In the late 1960s, attempts to portray a more modern image of the monarchy were made in the television documentary Royal Family and by televising Prince Charles's investiture as Prince of Wales. Her wardrobe developed a recognisable, signature style driven more by function than fashion. She dressed with an eye toward what was appropriate, rather than what was in vogue. In public, she took to wearing mostly solid-colour overcoats and decorative hats, allowing her to be seen easily in a crowd. Her wardrobe was handled by a team that included five dressers, a dressmaker, and a milliner.

In the 1980s, public criticism of the royal family increased, as the personal and working lives of Elizabeth's children came under media scrutiny. In 1997, she and other members of the royal family were perceived in the tabloid press as cold and unfeeling when they did not participate in the public outpouring of grief at the death of Diana, Princess of Wales. Elizabeth ignored precedent, opting to bow to Diana's coffin as it passed Buckingham Palace and also gave a live television broadcast paying tribute to Diana. Her family came under scrutiny again in the last few years of her life due to her son Andrew's association with convicted sex offenders Jeffrey Epstein and Ghislaine Maxwell, his lawsuit with Virginia Giuffre amidst accusations of sexual impropriety, and her grandson Harry and his wife Meghan's stepping-down as senior members of the royal family and subsequent move to the United States.

Elizabeth attended many cultural events as part of her public role. She gave an annual Christmas message to the Commonwealth every year, apart from 1969, while she was Queen. Elizabeth's first such message was aired on Christmas Day 1957. In 2001, the Royal Christmas Message was webcast on the royal website for the first time and, in 2006, it was made available as a podcast. Her first appearance on live television was for an address to Canadians on 13 October 1957, Thanksgiving Day in Canada that year. Elizabeth read her speech at Rideau Hall and it was aired by the Canadian Broadcasting Corporation.

Elizabeth never did a press interview. In 2018, she engaged in small talk with Alastair Bruce of Crionaich for the television documentary The Coronation. In 2006, Elizabeth had been filmed having a conversation with the later-disgraced Australian artist and media personality Rolf Harris while he painted her portrait. It ventured little beyond talk of previous portraits of Elizabeth and royal art history in general, and Elizabeth's responses to Harris's overtures were notably crisp and monosyllabic. She had a more jovial on-camera exchange with the painter Andrew Festing while sitting for a portrait in the 1992 BBC documentary Elizabeth R, directed by Edward Mirzoeff on the 40th anniversary of her accession.

The BBC, along with RDF Media Group, became the target of the Queen's lawyers, Farrer & Co, after the broadcaster aired a documentary trailer for Monarchy: The Royal Family at Work (2007), which was edited in such a way as to make it appear as though Elizabeth had stormed out of a photo shoot with photographer Annie Leibovitz. The BBC had earlier apologised for the misrepresentation, which was fuelled by BBC1 controller Peter Fincham describing Elizabeth as "losing it a bit and walking out in a huff"; but, Elizabeth and Buckingham Palace were not satisfied with the results and pushed to sue for breach of contract.

Elizabeth was the subject of "Her Majesty", featured on the Beatles' 1969 album Abbey Road; McCartney played the song at the Party at the Palace concert during Elizabeth's golden jubilee in 2002. She is also mentioned in the song "Mean Mr. Mustard" (also featured on Abbey Road), and in the 1967 Lennon and McCartney song "Penny Lane". In 1977, The Sex Pistols issued "God Save the Queen", which became a controversial hit single, inspiring the punk rock movement with its lyrics suggesting "She ain't no human being", and there was "no future" and comparing England to a "fascist regime." The Smiths released the song and album The Queen Is Dead in 1986. The Pet Shop Boys have a track called "Dreaming of the Queen". Elizabeth was the subject of "Elizabeth My Dear", which appears on The Stone Roses' eponymous debut. She is referenced in the Travie McCoy song "Billionaire" where he sings that he wants to be "on the cover of Forbes magazine./ Smiling next to Oprah and the Queen."

Elizabeth was included in Andy Warhol's portrait series in 1985 as one of four Reigning Queens, along with queens Ntfombi of Eswatini, Margrethe II of Denmark and Beatrix of the Netherlands.

Elizabeth played detective in the Her Majesty Investigates series of mystery novels by C.C. Benison, which includes Death at Buckingham Palace, Death at Windsor Castle and Death at Sandringham House. Elizabeth was the subject of The Queen and I, and was a character in Queen Camilla, both books written by Sue Townsend. She was also a character in the book The Uncommon Reader, by Alan Bennett.

In 2006, she was portrayed by Helen Mirren in the Golden Globe- and Academy Award-nominated Stephen Frears film The Queen, a fictional account of the immediate events following the death of Diana, Princess of Wales. The film ended up as the most critically acclaimed film of 2006. Mirren, who had been appointed into the Order of the British Empire in 2003, won the Oscar for her work in the film and, in her acceptance speech, she paid tribute to Queen Elizabeth II: "For 50 years and more, Elizabeth Windsor has maintained her dignity, her sense of duty and her hairstyle," she said.

Private Eye, the British satirical magazine, has given the royal family working-class nicknames, as though they were characters in a soap opera. Queen Elizabeth II's nickname is "Brenda".

The Crown, a biographical story about the reign of Elizabeth by Netflix, was released globally on 4 November 2016. It is based on an award-winning play, The Audience, and is a biopic drama television series, created and written by Peter Morgan and produced by Left Bank Pictures and Sony Pictures Television for Netflix. The show received critical accolade and has won many awards, including that of Outstanding Lead Actress in a Drama Series at the 70th and 73rd Primetime Emmy Awards for Claire Foy and Olivia Colman, respectively.

== Critics ==
The Queen's Diamond Jubilee attracted some controversy after campaigner Peter Tatchell criticised Elizabeth for inviting "royal tyrants". At the time Amnesty International and Human Rights Watch had accused both the kings of Bahrain and Eswatini as well as certain members of the Saudi Arabian and Kuwaiti royal families of various human rights abuses.

An investigation by The Guardian in February 2021 alleged that Elizabeth II had used the power of Queen's Consent to secretly influence the content of parliamentary bills that could affect the Crown's financial interests, particularly bills related to wealth and taxation. For example, the report claims that Elizabeth used the procedure to request an exemption for her private estates from a 1968 road safety bill, and to request changes to a 1975 bill regulating the leasing of private land. The Guardian also reported that the Queen's royal household had barred "coloured immigrants and foreigners" from working in clerical roles, and that the household had used the consent mechanism to lobby Parliament for an exemption from a 1960s law banning employment discrimination. This exemption has prevented women and people of colour who work for the royal household from suing for discrimination. However, Buckingham Palace responded to The Guardian, stating that consent was always granted when requested and that legislation was never blocked.

Groups opposed to the monarchy sometimes refer to Elizabeth as "Betty Windsor" or "Liz Windsor".

== Fictional portrayals ==
Given the time period in which she lived and the media technology available, she is most probably the real world individual (as opposed to fictional creation) with the greatest number of fictional portrayals, including the following:

=== Film ===
Elizabeth has been portrayed on screen by:

- Steven Walden in drag in the X-rated short film spoof Tricia's Wedding (1971), said to be the very first portrayal of Elizabeth on film.
- Huguette Funfrock, a French actress who specialised in playing her, in the spoof Bons baisers de Hong Kong (1975), the comedy Le Bourreau des cœurs (1983), and the Hong Kong film Aces Go Places 3 (1984)
- Jeannette Charles, who specialised in playing Elizabeth, in numerous film and television appearances, including:
  - Queen Kong (1976)
  - All You Need Is Cash (also titled The Rutles) (1978)
  - National Lampoon's European Vacation (1985)
  - The Naked Gun: From the Files of Police Squad! (1988)
  - Austin Powers in Goldmember (2002)
- Angela Thorne voiced the character of Queen Elizabeth in The BFG (1989)
- Scott Thompson in Kids in the Hall: Brain Candy (1996)
- Carolyn Sadowska in The Duke (1999)
- Margaret Eggleton-Kaye in the comedy The Pooch and the Pauper (1999)
- Rachel Wallis in Her Majesty (2001)
- Jeanette Vane has a small part playing Elizabeth in Ali G Indahouse (2002)
- Prunella Scales in Johnny English (2003), where her abdication, despite having little screen time, is a major plot point
- Neve Campbell in the spoof Churchill: The Hollywood Years (2004)

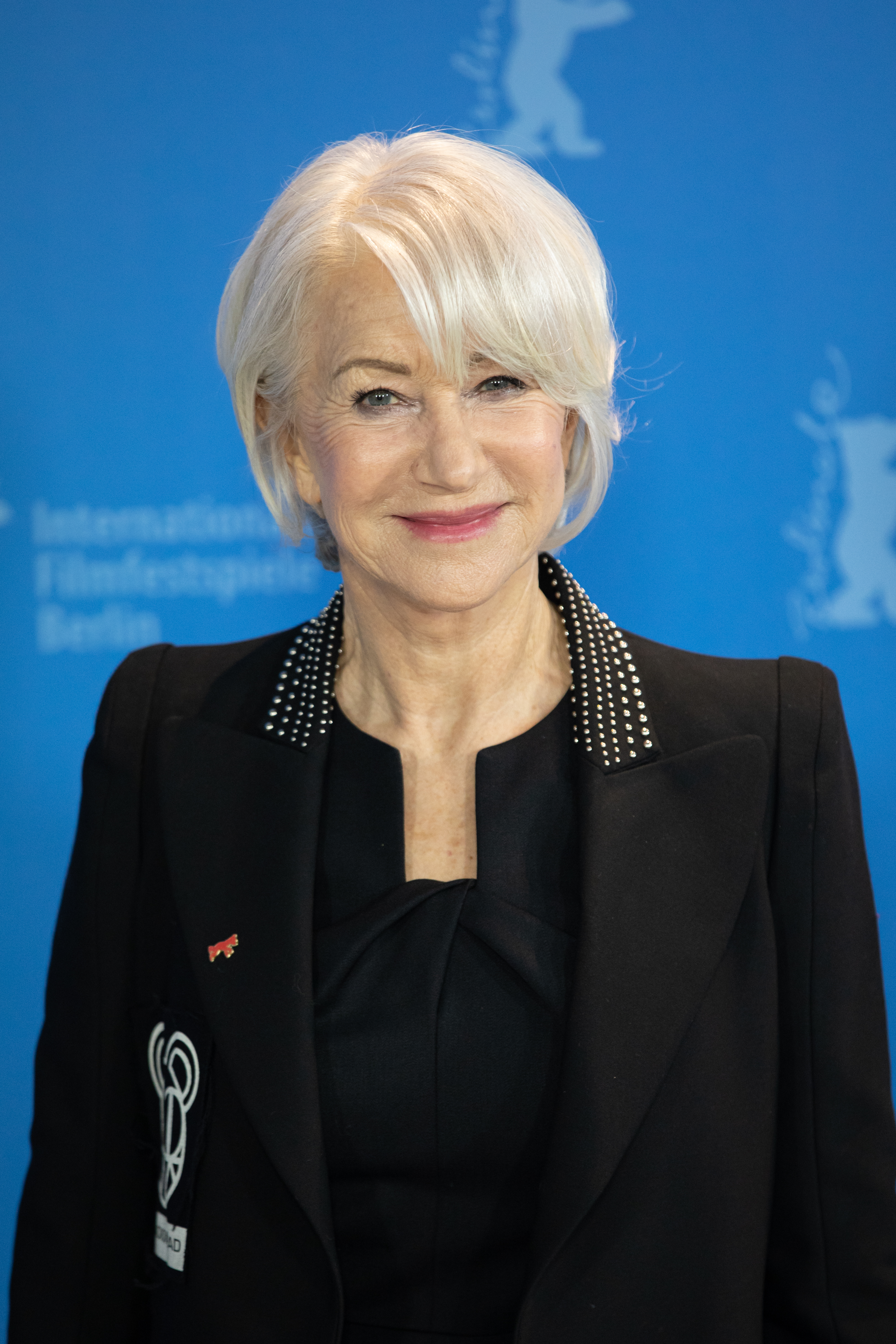
Dame Helen Mirren, who portrayed Queen Elizabeth II in The Queen (2006), won the Academy Award for Best Actress for her role

- Dame Helen Mirren in The Queen (2006), for which she won the Academy Award for Best Actress and the BAFTA Award for Best Actress in a Leading Role
- Lesley Staples in the straight-to-video Royal Faceoff (2006)
- Elena Safonova in the Russian comedy film A Hare over the Abyss (2006)
- In the Bollywood film Dhoom 2 (2006), Hrithik Roshan's character sky-dives and lands on a train carrying Elizabeth. He steals her crown by disguising himself as her, and escapes. Roshan also briefly plays the Queen herself.
- Elizabeth Richard in the disaster movie 2012 (2009), shown in a cameo while going to one of the ark with her dogs and other British officials; in the straight-to-video comedy Never Say Never Mind: The Swedish Bikini Team (2001); and in the American movie What a Girl Wants (2003)
- Freya Wilson as a child in The King's Speech (2010)
- Vanessa Redgrave voiced Elizabeth in the American animated film Cars 2 (2011), the character is modeled after a Rolls-Royce Phantom IV.
- Joanna Lumley in Gangsta Granny (2013)
- Sarah Gadon as a young Princess Elizabeth in A Royal Night Out (2015)
- Jennifer Saunders voiced the character of Queen Elizabeth in the American animated film Minions (2015)
- Penelope Wilton in The BFG (2016)
- Elizabeth is again featured in Johnny English part 3; Pik-Sen Lim plays her at the end of the movie and in one scene she tries to kill Johnny English
- Mari Devon (US) and Julie Walters (UK) voiced the character of Queen Elizabeth in the Belgian animated feature film The Queen's Corgi (2019)
- Stella Gonet in Spencer (2021)

=== Music video ===
- "U Don't Know Me": Elizabeth is played by a look-alike and is seen drinking, fighting and fleeing police during a night out in Soho, London
- "Ek Chumma": Elizabeth and members of the Royal Family are played by look-alikes and are seen singing and dancing with the main cast of Housefull 4
- "That's the Way (I Like It)", by Clock; it features the Queen, the Palace Guards, Tony Blair and other individuals dancing with the band.

=== Television ===
On television, Elizabeth has been played by:

- Jeannette Charles and Huguette Funfrock many times from the 1970s onwards, mostly in comedic roles
- Stanley Baxter in The Stanley Baxter Picture Show (1972)
- Carol Burnett, in various sketches in The Carol Burnett Show (1970s)
- Sheila Steafel in several episodes of the BBC comedy series The Goodies (1975–1977)
- Jo Kendall in an episode of The Goodies entitled "Politics" (1980)
- Margaret Tyzack in the drama Charles & Diana: A Royal Love Story (1982)
- Dana Wynter in the drama The Royal Romance of Charles and Diana (1982)
- Sally Grace in an episode of the ITV sitcom Never the Twain entitled "The Royal Connection" (1984)
- Mary Reynolds (uncredited) in the Doctor Who story "Silver Nemesis" (1988)
- Scott Thompson on the sketch comedy show The Kids in the Hall (1988–1995)
- Prunella Scales in the BBC drama A Question of Attribution (1992), based on the play by Alan Bennett
- Iris Russell in the drama Fergie & Andrew: Behind the Palace Doors (1992)
- Carolyn Sadowska in the drama The Women of Windsor (1992)
- Amanda Walker in the drama Charles and Diana: Unhappily Ever After (1992)
- Anne Stallybrass in the drama Diana: Her True Story (1993)
- Elizabeth Richard many times, including the comedy dramas Giving Tongue (1996) and Gobble (1997)
- Lisa Daniely in the drama Princess in Love (1996)
- Irm Hermann in the German comedy Willi und die Windzors (1996)
- Beth Boyd in the comedy My Government and I (2000)
- Elisabeth Dermot Walsh in the Carlton Television drama Bertie and Elizabeth (2002)
- Rosemary Leach in the drama Prince William (2002) and the BBC comedy drama Tea with Betty (2006)
- Julia Munrow in the BBC drama Love Again (2003), about Philip Larkin
- Deirdre Loys Jordan in the Brazilian TV network Rede Globo's soap opera Senhora do Destino's episode 1 (2004)
- Helen Duffy in an episode of the sitcom Hannah Montana entitled "Grandmas Don't Let Your Babies Grow Up to Play Favorites" (2006)
- Herself in Children's Party at the Palace (2006)
- Dilys Laye in the comedy drama series The Amazing Mrs Pritchard (2006)
- Jessica Martin briefly at the end of the Christmas special of the BBC series Doctor Who entitled "Voyage of the Damned" (2007)
- Rosemary Leach in Margaret (2009)
- Emilia Fox, Samantha Bond, Barbara Flynn, Susan Jameson, and Diana Quick in the docudrama serial The Queen (2009)
- Jane Alexander in William & Catherine: A Royal Romance (2011)
- Emma Thompson in the Playhouse Presents episode "Walking the Dogs" (2012)
- Herself, actress Julia McKenzie, and stunt double Gary Connery in the short film Happy and Glorious co-starring Daniel Craig as James Bond, part of the 2012 Summer Olympics opening ceremony (2012)
- Martha Howe-Douglas in Series 5 Episode 5 of Horrible Histories (2013)
- Scott Thompson in the Fugget About It episode "Royally Screwed" (2013)
- June Squibb in 7 Days in Hell (2015)
- Claire Foy, Verity Russell, Olivia Colman, Imelda Staunton, and Viola Prettejohn in the Netflix series The Crown (2016–2023)
- Roxana Lupu and Christina Richards in the Channel 5 documentary series Inside Windsor Castle (2017)
- Maggie Sullivun in Harry & Meghan: A Royal Romance (2018)
- Samantha Bond in the Sky One Christmas special adaptation of Sue Townsend's 1993 novel The Queen and I (2018)
- Gwenda Lorenzetti in the Legends of Tomorrow episode "Dancing Queen" (2018)
- Jessica Ellerby in the Epix series Pennyworth (2019–present)
- Sharon Miller (voice) in Thomas & Friends: "The Royal Engine" episode (2020). Elizabeth II also appears in two episodes in the fourth series of this show, though she has no dialogue.
- Debra Stephenson (voice) in Spitting Image (2020 TV series) (2020–present)
- Debra Stephenson (voice) in Alternative Christmas message (2020). As a "stark warning" of the dangers of fake news, Stephenson voiced a deepfake version of Elizabeth for the alternative Christmas message broadcast by Channel 4.
- Tracey Ullman in Death to 2020 (2020)
- During the premiere episode of RuPaul's Drag Race UK, contestants were asked to bring a look inspired by Elizabeth II. Drag queen Anita Wigl'it also portrayed her in the Snatch Game episode of RuPaul's Drag Race Down Under Season 1, where she won the challenge.
- Frances de la Tour (voice) in The Prince (2021)
- Herself in a short film having tea with Paddington Bear (co-starring Ben Whishaw as the voice of Paddington), preceding the Platinum Party at the Palace concert (2022)

The Queen depicted with Mr. Bean in Mr. Bean: The Animated Series.

She has been portrayed on Saturday Night Live since 1977 by, among others, Fred Armisen, Mike Myers, and Kate McKinnon. Jan Ravens was the voice for a latex puppet caricature of her in Spitting Image (1984–1996), and gave radio and television comedy impressions of her in Dead Ringers. Luba Goy gave a recurring impression of Queen Elizabeth II on Royal Canadian Air Farce and Cathy Jones in This Hour Has 22 Minutes. Tracey Ullman's depiction of Elizabeth was among many roles she played on the television series Tracey Takes On.... The Simpsons portrayed Elizabeth during the episode "The Regina Monologues" (2003). She was also shown in the SpongeBob SquarePants TV movie Truth or Square. Elizabeth is also a supporting character in Peppa Pig and Mr. Bean: The Animated Series.

=== Stage ===
- Prunella Scales in A Question of Attribution (1988)
- Marion Bailey and Clare Holman in Handbagged (2013)
- Marion Bailey and Lucy Robinson in Handbagged (2014)
- Susie Blake and Emma Handy in Handbagged (2015)
- Helen Mirren in The Audience (2013)
- Kristin Scott Thomas in The Audience (2015)
- Fiona Reid in The Audience (2016)
- Inna Churikova in The Audience (2017)
- Judy Kaye in the musical Diana (2019)
- Theresa Healey in The Audience (2019)

=== Radio ===
In December 2012, as part of a radio show, a group of Australian radio jockeys rang up the King Edward VII's Hospital, where Catherine, Duchess of Cambridge was staying. Mel Greig impersonated Elizabeth and Mike Christian impersonated Prince Charles. One of the nurses who spoke to them, Jacintha Saldanha, later committed suicide and there was much criticism directed at the radio show. There were no charges laid against the radio jockeys.

== Novels and children's books ==
Elizabeth has played a role in the plots of fictional works, including mystery novels, satires, historical fiction, and children's books.

=== Novels ===
- The Queen and I, by Sue Townsend (1993)
- Death at Buckingham Palace: Her Majesty Investigates, by C.C. Benison (1996)
- Death at Sandringham House: Her Majesty Investigates, by C.C. Benison (1996)
- Death at Windsor Castle: Her Majesty Investigates, by C.C. Benison (1998)
- Autobiography of the Queen, by Emma Tennant (2007)
- Queen Camilla (novel), by Sue Townsend (2012)
- Mrs. Queen Takes the Train: A Novel, by William Kuhn (2012)
- Princess Elizabeth's Spy (A Maggie Hope Mystery), by Susan Elia MacNeal (2012)
- The Queen's Accomplice (A Maggie Hope Mystery), by Susan Elia MacNeal (2016)
- The Gown: A Novel of the Royal Wedding, by Jennifer Robson (2018)
- The Secret Guests, by John Banville (2020)
- The Windsor Knot: A Novel (Her Majesty the Queen Investigates, I), by SJ Bennett (2021)
- A Three Dog Problem / All the Queen's Men (Her Majesty the Queen Investigates, II), by SJ Bennett (2022)
- Coronation Year by Jennifer Robson (2023)

=== Novellas ===
- The Uncommon Reader: A Novella, by Alan Bennett (2008)

=== Children's books ===
- Gordon the Big Engine, by Wilbert Awdry (1953)
- The BFG, by Roald Dahl (1982)
- Rainbow Magic: Georgie the Royal Prince Fairy, by Daisy Meadows (2014)
- Tea with the Queen, by Chrissie Hart (2014)
- The Queen's Hat (The Queen Collection), by Steve Antony (2014)
- Winnie-the-Pooh Meets the Queen, by Jane Riordan (2016)
- The Queen's Handbag (The Queen Collection), by Steve Antony (2016)
- The Queen's Present (The Queen Collection), by Steve Antony (2017)
- The Boy at the Back of the Class, by Onjali Q. Raúf (2018)
- The Queen's Lift-Off (The Queen Collection), by Steve Antony (2019)

== Documentaries and television series ==
=== Documentaries ===
- The Royal Wedding (Short documentary) (1947)
- Royal Journey (Canada) (1951)
- Royal Heritage (Short documentary) (1952)
- A Queen is Crowned (1953)
- Elizabeth is Queen (Short documentary) (1953)
- Long To Reign Over Us (Short documentary) (1953)
- Royal Destiny (Short documentary) (1953)
- A Queen's World Tour (1954)
- Royal New Zealand Journey (1954)
- The Queen in Australia (Australia) (1954)
- The Sceptre and the Mace (Canada) (Short documentary) (1957)
- Life of a Queen (Short documentary) (1960)
- The Royal Tour of India (1961)
- Queen Elizabeth II in Pakistan (Short documentary) (1961)
- The Queen Returns (Australia) (1963)
- The Royal Tour of the Caribbean (1966)
- Hello Elisabeth! (Finland) (1976)
- Twenty Five Years (1977)
- Queen Elizabeth II: 60 Glorious Years (1986)
- The Royal Year (1987)
- Tribute to Her Majesty (1987)
- Queen Elizabeth II: The Power and Glory (1991)
- From Princess to Queen: Elizabeth II – Childhood to Statehood (1996)
- 50 Glorious Years – A Royal Celebration (1997)
- Queen's Golden Jubilee 2002: Party at the Palace (2002)
- The Queen: Behind the Mask (2007)
- The Queen – A life in Film (2008)
- The Story of Queen Elizabeth II (2011)
- Die Queen – Elizabeth II. (Germany) (2012)
- Elizabeth II – A Diamond Jubilee Celebration (2012)
- Elizabeth II – Le Portrait (Canada) (2012)
- Queen Elizabeth II: A Lifetime of Service (2012)
- Queen Elizabeth II – Reign Supreme (2012)
- The Queen's Diamond Decades (2012)
- The Majestic Life of Queen Elizabeth II (2013)
- The Queen at 90 (2016)
- Queen Elizabeth II: End of A Reign (US) (2020)
- The Queen at War (US) (2020)
- Queen Elizabeth II: The Unlikely Queen (US) (2021)
- Elizabeth Windsor (2022)
- Queen Elizabeth II: Above All Else (2022)
- Elizabeth and Margaret: Pride and Joy (2022)
- Our Platinum Queen: 70 Years on the Throne (2022)
- Portrait of the Queen (2022)
- Farewell Your Majesty (UK) (2023)
- The Queen's Children (2023)
- Elizabeth & the Presidents (2023)
- Elizabeth II – Britain's Longest Reigning Monarch (2023)
- Churchill & The Queen (2023)
- How Her Majesty Used to Dress (2023)
- Life Before the Crown: Princess Elizabeth (2024)
- Princess Elizabeth: Destined for Greatness (2024)
- Queen Elizabeth II: The Unlikely Queen (2024)
- Elizabeth & Philip: Eternally Yours (2024)
- The Funeral of Queen Elizabeth II (2024)
- Moments That Defined Queen Elizabeth (2024)

=== TV film and series documentaries ===
- Royal Family (1969)
- The Crown in New Zealand (1970)
- Royal Heritage (1977)
- Jubilee and Beyond (Australia) (1977)
- Elizabeth – The First Thirty Years (1985)
- Canada and the Monarchy (1992)
- Elizabeth R: A Year in the Life of the Queen (1992)
- Days of Majesty (1993)
- The Windsors: A Royal Family PBS (US) (1994)
- Britannia – The Palace at Sea (1995)
- Elizabeth: The Reluctant Monarch (1998)
- Queen & Country BBC (2002)
- The Jubilee Girl (2002)
- The Queen: A Remarkable Life (2002)
- The Royal Jewels (2002)
- An Unforgettable Coronation BBC (2003)
- The Queen's Castle (2005)
- Ten Days that Made the Queen (2006)
- The Girl Who Would Be Queen (2006)
- The Queen at 80 (2006)
- The Queen by Rolf (2006)
- Königin – Ein Job fürs Leben: Queen Elisabeth II. (Germany) (2007)
- Monarchy: The Royal Family at Work (2007)
- The Queen's Wedding (2007)
- The Queen's Coronation: Behind Palace Doors (2008)
- The Queen's Palaces BBC (2011)
- A Jubilee Tribute to the Queen by the Prince of Wales BBC (2012)
- Elizabeth: Queen of Scots (2012)
- Elizabeth: Queen, Wife, Mother (TV Movie documentary) (2012)
- The Changing Face of the Queen (2012)
- The Coronation of Queen Elizabeth II (TV Movie documentary) (2012)
- The Diamond Queen (2012)
- The Queen and Her Prime Ministers (2012)
- The Queen (Arte) (France/Germany) (2012)
- Our Queen ITV (2013)
- In Their Own Words: Queen Elizabeth II PBS (US) (2015)
- The Queen's Big Night Out Channel 4 (2015)
- The Queen's Longest Reign: Elizabeth and Victoria BBC (2015)
- Cue The Queen: Celebrating the Christmas Speech BBC (2015)
- Elizabeth at 90: A Family Portrait (TV Movie documentary) BBC (2016)
- Our Queen at 90 ITV (2016)
- A Very Royal Wedding ITV (2017)
- Elizabeth & Philip: Love and Duty BBC One (2017)
- Inside Windsor Castle Channel 5 (2017)
- The Royal House of Windsor Channel 4 (2017)
- The Coronation (2018)
- Elizabeth Our Queen Channel 5 (2018)
- The Queen – Her Commonwealth Story BBC (2018)
- The Queen's Green Planet ITV (2018)
- Elizabeth II, 65 ans de règne et de secrets (France) (2018)
- The Queen's Coronation in Colour ITV (2018)
- The Story of the Royals ABC (US) (2018)
- Queen of the World ITV (2018)
- The Crown and Us: the story of the Royals in Australia ABC (Australia) (2019)
- Paxman on the Queen's Children Channel 5 (2019)
- Secrets of the Royal Servants (2019)
- Inside the Crown: Secrets of the Royals ITV (2020)
- Our Queen at War ITV (2020)
- The Queen's Speeches: In Triumph & Tragedy Channel 5 (2020)
- The Queen: Duty Before Family? Channel 5 (2020)
- Elizabeth and Margaret: Love & Loyalty Channel 5 (2020)
- The Queen & Charles: Mother and Son Channel 5 (2020)
- Being The Queen National Geographic (US) (2020)
- The Queen and the Coup Channel 4 (2020)
- My Years with The Queen – ITV (2021)
- Elizabeth at 95: The Invincible Queen True Royalty TV (2021)
- The Queen: 70 Glorious Years BBC (2022)
- Elizabeth I & II: The Golden Queens BBC (2022)
- Elizabeth: The Unseen Queen BBC (2022)
- Elizabeth: A Portrait in Parts Amazon Prime (2022)
- My Government and I BBC (2022)
- Our Queen: The People's Stories ITV (2022)
- Queen Elizabeth II – The story of her coronation Deutsche Welle (2022)
- The Queen & Britain's Crown Jewels in History BBC (2022)
- The Queen and I BBC (2022)
- The Queen and Us BBC (2022)
- Elizabeth II: A Life of Duty Sky News (2022)
- The Queen & Her People BBC (2022)
- The Queen & Wales BBC (2022)
- The Queen in Her Own Words (ITV) (2022)
- When The Queen Spoke to the Nation BBC (2022)
- A Tribute to Her Majesty The Queen BBC (2022)
- Her Majesty's Music BBC (2022)
- Culture and the Queen BBC (2022)
- The Royal Diplomat BBC (2022)
- God's Servant Queen BBC (2022)

== Image on currency ==
Four coin portraits of Elizabeth II

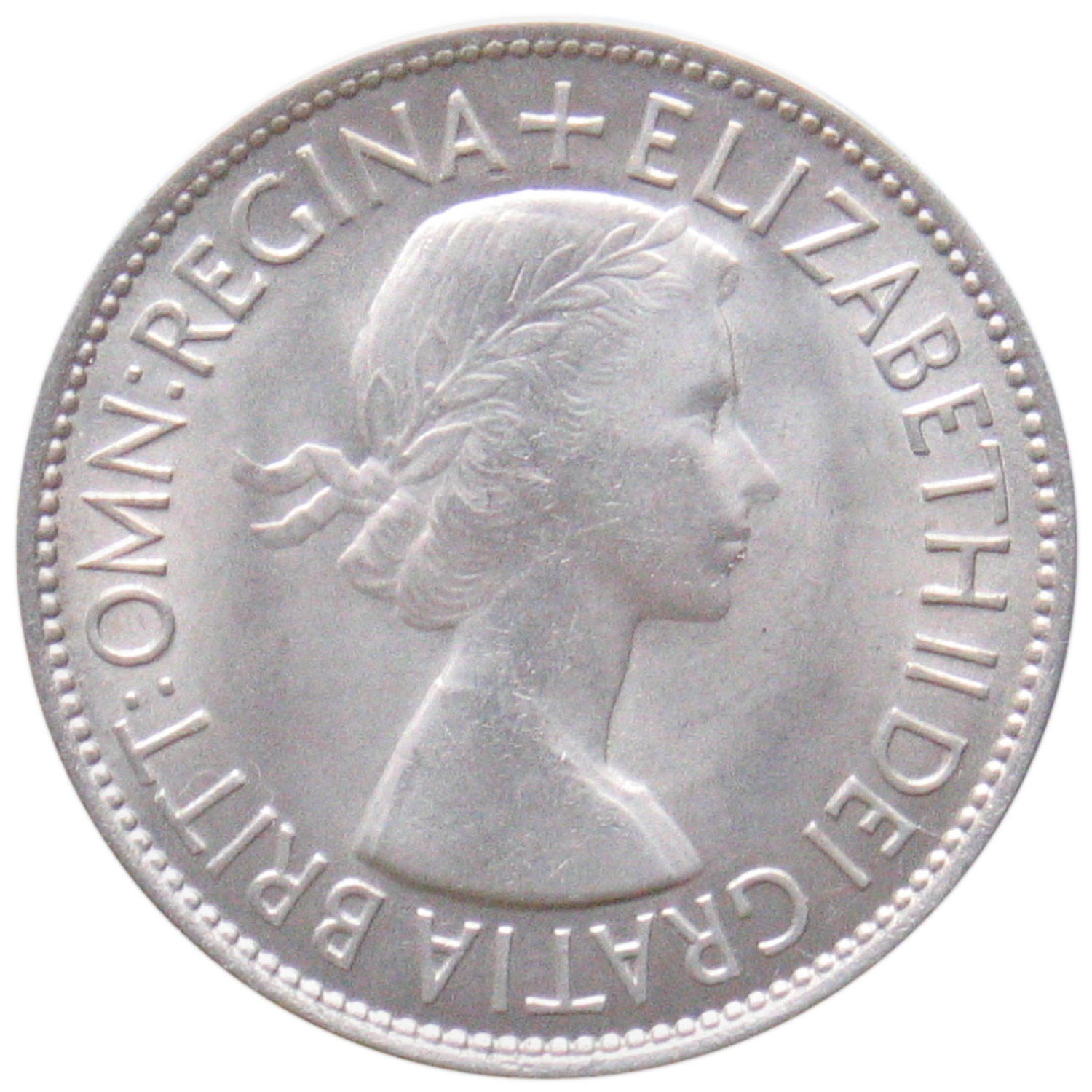
Mary Gillick (1953)

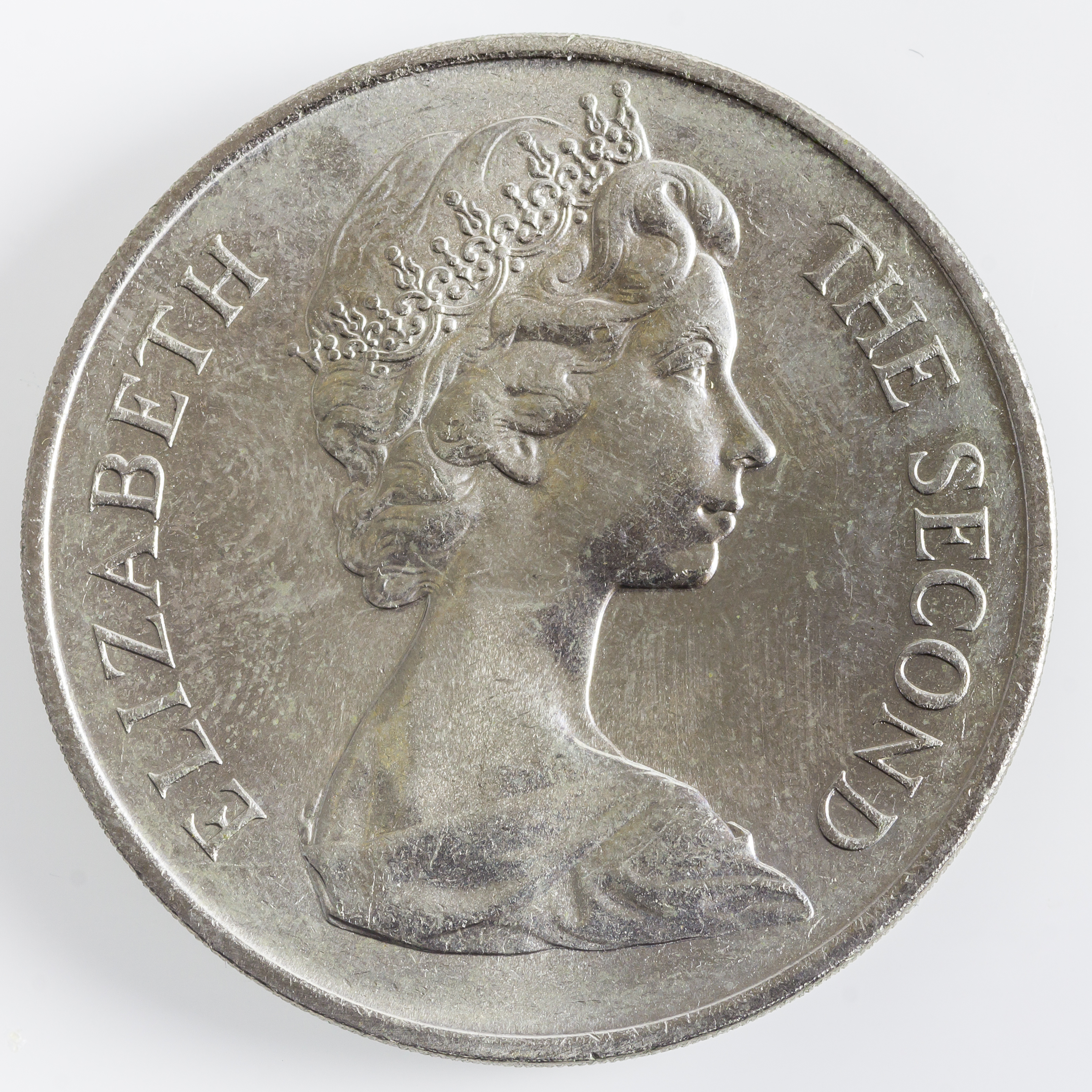
Arnold Machin (1964)

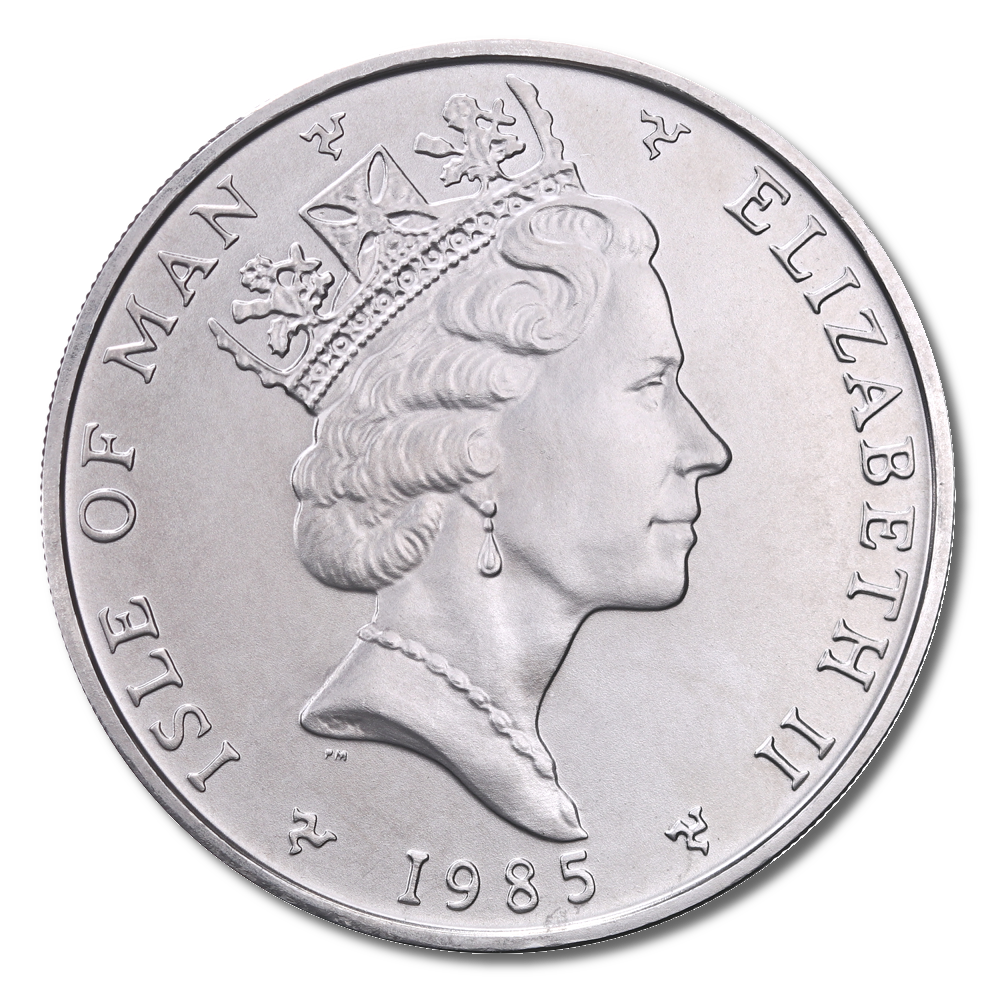
Raphael Maklouf (1985)

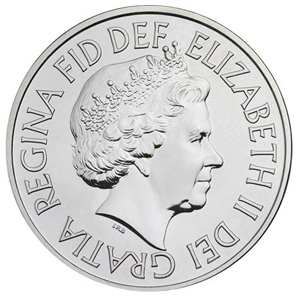
Ian Rank-Broadley (1998)

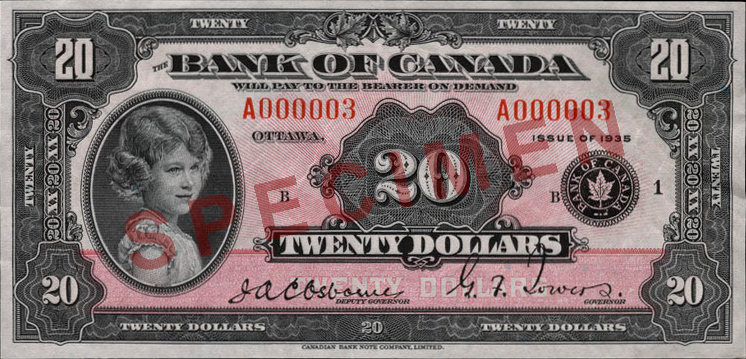
Canada was the first country to feature Elizabeth on their banknotes

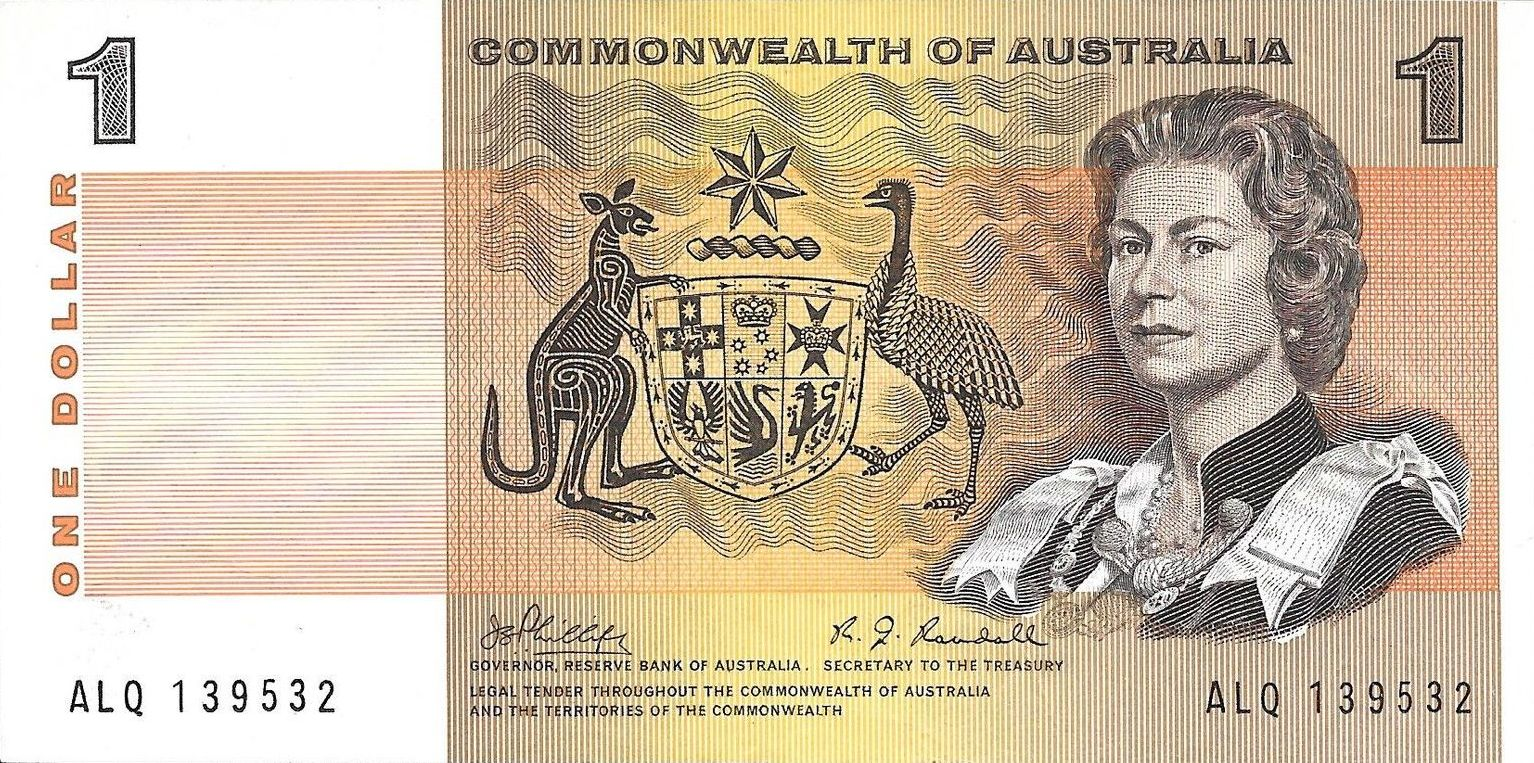
The Queen on an Australian one-dollar banknote

The image of Queen Elizabeth has appeared on the banknotes of at least 35 countries, making her the Guinness World Record holder for the "Most Currencies Featuring the Same Individual". Her depictions on these currencies serve as a photo journal of sorts, as they span the range of Elizabeth's life, from youth to the end of her life.

== Patronage of charities ==
The Queen was patron of more than 620 charities and organisations including:

- Campaign to Protect Rural England
- Canadian Medical Association
- The Kennel Club
- NSPCC
- Royal Architectural Institute of Canada
- Queen Elizabeth Hospital for Children
- Royal School of Church Music
- Society for Promoting Christian Knowledge
- Boys' Brigade
- Queens' College, Cambridge
- Visitor of Christ Church, Oxford
- Visitor of Westminster School
- Visitor of Ruthin School

== See also ==
- Elizabeth II's jewels
- Monarchy of Canada § In media and popular culture
