= The Queen and I =

The Queen and I or Queen and I may refer to:

- The Queen and I (novel), a 1992 novel by Sue Townsend
- The Queen and I (2018 film), a British TV film comedy drama based on the novel of the same name
- The Queen and I (2008 film), a documentary film about Iranian Empress Farah Pahlavi
- "The Queen and I" (song), a single by Gym Class Heroes from their album As Cruel as School Children
- The Queen & I (American TV series), a 1969 sitcom starring Larry Storch and Billy De Wolfe
- "The Queen and I (99 BPM)", a song by The Justified Ancients of Mu Mu, from the album 1987 (What the Fuck Is Going On?)
- Queen and I (South Korean TV series), a 2012 television series
