= Royal Lodge =

House in Berkshire, England

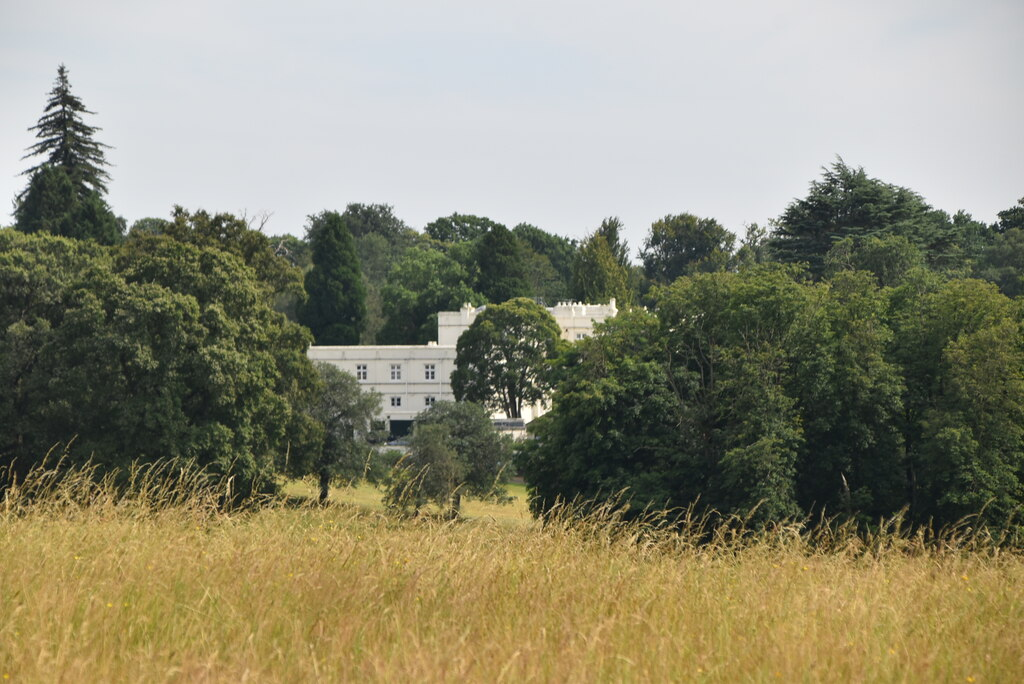

- Location within Berkshire
- 51.4390°N 0.6068°W
- Location: Berkshire

History
- Demolished: 1830
- Rebuilt: 1840

Site notes
- Owner: Crown Estate

Listed Building – Grade II
- Designated: 3 March 1972
- Reference no.: 1323669

Royal Lodge is a Grade II listed house in Windsor Great Park in Berkshire, England, half a mile north of Cumberland Lodge and 3.2 miles (5.1 km) south of Windsor Castle. The site of homes since the 17th century, the present structure dates from the 19th century, and was expanded in the 1930s for the then Duke of York, the future King George VI. Its central section consists of three storeys, with two-storey wings, totalling about 30 rooms, including seven bedrooms. The Royal Chapel of All Saints was built on the grounds in the 1820s.

Part of the Crown Estate, it was the Windsor residence of Queen Elizabeth the Queen Mother from 1952 until her death in 2002, after which it served as the official country residence of Prince Andrew (latterly Andrew Mountbatten-Windsor) and his family from 2004 until 2026.

== History ==
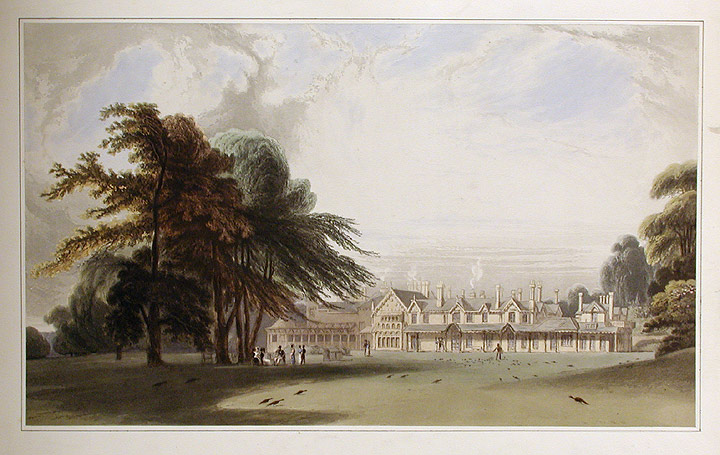
Royal Lodge in 1827, before much of it was demolished

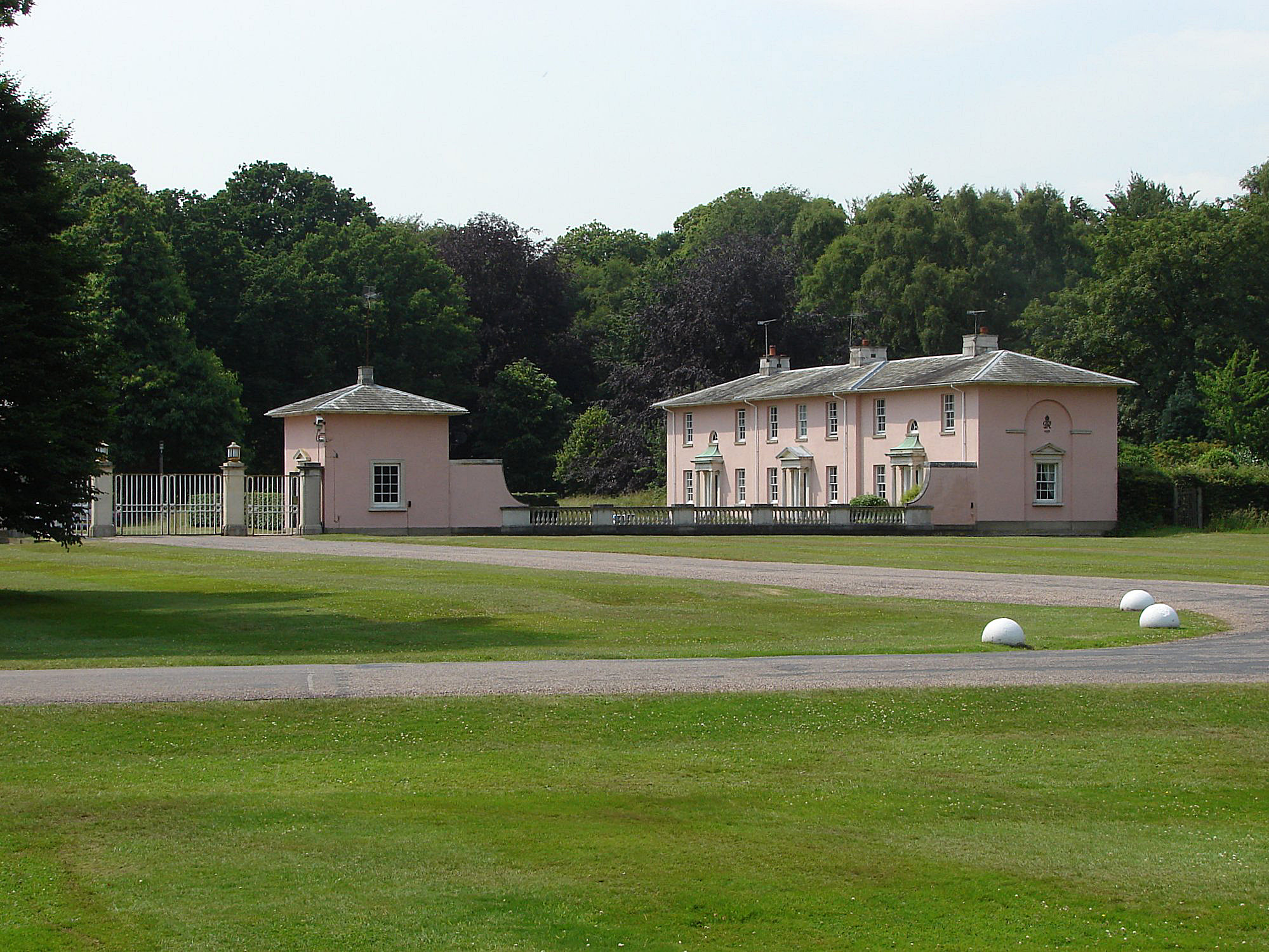
The entrance gates in 2013

Royal Lodge dates back to the mid-seventeenth century, with a house on the site by 1662. By 1750, the small Queen Anne-style brick house was being used in conjunction with the adjacent dairy. By this time, it was known variously as the Lower Lodge (to distinguish it from Cumberland Lodge, then known as the Great Lodge), or the Dairy Lodge.

From the mid-eighteenth century, it was the residence of military topographer and artist Thomas Sandby (the brother of the better-known Paul), who served as Deputy Ranger of the Great Park. The house was then known as the Deputy Ranger's House. It was expanded in 1792 and became the residence of Joseph Frost, the Park Bailiff, and later of the General Superintendent of Farms following Sandby's death.

George, Prince of Wales (later King George IV) planned to rebuild Cumberland Lodge after becoming prince regent. He used the Lower Lodge as temporary accommodation in 1812. Alterations and additions were undertaken by John Nash for George. The chapels of Royal and Cumberland Lodges proved too small for the royal households in the early 19th century, and the Royal Chapel of All Saints was built in 1825 by Jeffry Wyatville, less than a hundred yards from Royal Lodge. It was now a large and elaborate cottage in the contemporary style of the cottage orné, with thatched roofs, verandas, and a conservatory. It became known as the Prince Regent's Cottage after the prince moved into it in 1815. The renovation of Cumberland Lodge was abandoned. Additions were made after 1820. In 1823, Jeffry Wyatt (later Sir Jeffry Wyatville) succeeded Nash as architect, and the house (known now as the "King's Cottage") became known as Royal Lodge in the late 1820s. After 1830, King William IV ordered the demolition of all of the house, except the conservatory. It became a residence again in 1840 and was used as accommodation for various officers of the Royal Household until 1843 and from 1873 to 1931.

The grounds extend to 98 acres (40 hectares), partly under its own head gardener, but primarily the responsibility of the Crown Estates Commissioners. While the house has been expanding gradually since the 1840s, it remains relatively small and informal, yet the grounds follow a cohesive plan. This was the result of work undertaken by the Duke and Duchess of York in the 1930s, with the assistance of Sir Eric Savill, of the Windsor Estate.

In 1931, King George V granted Royal Lodge to the Duke and Duchess of York (later King George VI and Queen Elizabeth) as a country retreat. Wings were added on each flank in the 1930s. There are two lodges at the entrance and groups of three cottages on each side of the lodges. The main building has some 30 rooms, including seven bedrooms and a saloon (48 by 30 by 30 feet, 14.6 by 9.1 by 9.1 m). The original conservatory survives. The grounds contain the miniature cottage Y Bwthyn Bach, a gift to Princess Elizabeth as a child from the people of Wales in 1932. On 11 December 1936, the Duke of Windsor took leave of his family at Royal Lodge following his abdication speech before leaving for overseas and exile. King George VI and Queen Elizabeth and their daughters Princesses Elizabeth (later Queen Elizabeth II) and Margaret were depicted in Royal Lodge in Herbert James Gunn's 1950 painting Conversation Piece at the Royal Lodge, Windsor. After the death of her husband George VI in 1952, the Queen Mother continued to use the house as one of her country retreats as a grace and favour residence until her death. The Queen Mother died at Royal Lodge on 30 March 2002, with her daughter, Queen Elizabeth II, and niece Margaret Rhodes, by her side. In 2018, the wedding reception for Princess Eugenie and Jack Brooksbank was held at the Royal Lodge.

== Lease to Andrew Mountbatten-Windsor ==
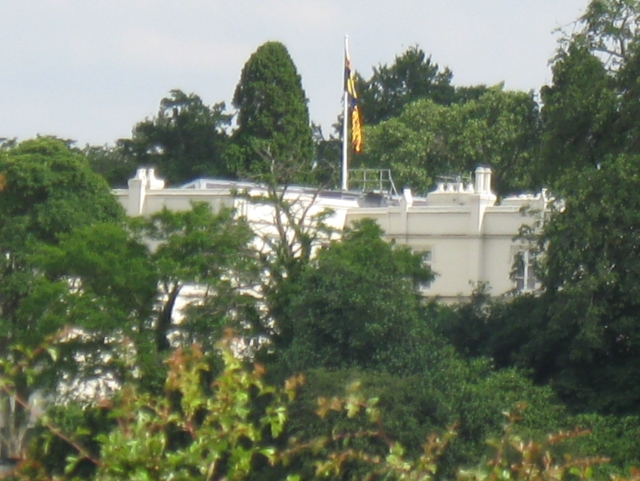
The banner of Prince Andrew seen here on Royal Lodge in 2008

In August 2003, Prince Andrew was granted a lease agreement by the Crown Estate for 75 years. The property lease included Royal Lodge, a Gardener's Cottage, the Chapel Lodge, six Lodge Cottages, and police security accommodation in addition to 40 hectares of land. The lease agreement required Andrew to undertake refurbishments at his own expense, which was estimated at £7.5 million at September 2002 prices, excluding VAT. It also specified a premium payment of £1 million. The National Audit Office (NAO) report into the lease agreement stated that the Crown Estate's independent advisors had advised that the refurbishment work would cost at least £5 million and that Andrew should be given the option to buy out the notional annual rental payment (set at £260,000) for £2.5 million. Once the prince committed to spending £7.5 million on refurbishment, it was decided that no rental would be required as he would be treated as having effectively bought out the notional annual rental payment because he exceeded the minimum £5 million required for refurbishment. As a result, only the £1 million premium was paid to the Crown Estate. On 21 October 2025, it was reported that Andrew paid a peppercorn rent for the lease of the Royal Lodge and that the legal agreement stipulated he and his family were entitled to live in the property until 2078.

There was no provision for any further rent review over the life of the 75-year lease agreement (unlike the rent reviews provided in the case of Bagshot Park, the residence of Prince Edward, Duke of Edinburgh, also leased from the Crown Estate). The lease agreement provided that the prince may not benefit financially from any increase in the value of the property, as the freehold belongs to the Crown Estate. The leasehold could be assigned only to his widow or his two daughters, Princess Beatrice and Princess Eugenie, or a trust established solely for their benefit. If the prince terminated the lease, the property would revert to the Crown Estate. He would be entitled to compensation for the refurbishment costs incurred, up to a maximum of just under £7 million, which is reduced annually over the first 25 years, after which no compensation is payable. The NAO report stated that having already taken advice from one independent advisor on the transaction, the Crown Estate appointed a second firm of independent advisors to assess the details of the lease deal, given its importance. The second independent advisor concluded that the deal was appropriate, considering the importance of retaining management control over the Royal Lodge and the security implications, especially concerning the Royal Family's access to the Royal Chapel. In the circumstances, the Crown Estate considered that the requirement to obtain value for money was satisfied, taking into account the non-financial considerations relating to the lease of the property. The alternative use, to lease it on the commercial market, was not viable.

Following the renovations, Andrew with his two daughters moved into the house in 2004, having vacated Sunninghill Park. In 2008, his former wife Sarah Ferguson moved into Royal Lodge, again sharing a house with Andrew. It has been reported that the open market value of the property would have been at least £30 million, as of January 2022. After Andrew stepped down from public duties in November 2019, the flagpole on the roof of Royal Lodge, used to fly the personal Royal Standard of Prince Andrew when in residence, was removed. In 2023, reports suggested that King Charles III was to cut Andrew's annual grant, potentially leaving him unable to afford the Lodge's running costs, and he had been offered the smaller five-bedroom Frogmore Cottage instead, until then the UK residence of Prince Harry, Duke of Sussex, and his family, who had been issued a request to vacate by Buckingham Palace.

On 30 October 2025, Buckingham Palace announced that Andrew and his family would move out of Royal Lodge due to allegations, which he denies, regarding his association with American financier and child sex offender Jeffrey Epstein, with the expectation that he would relocate to a property on the private Sandringham estate in Norfolk, a move privately funded by the King. While in principle he would be entitled to £488,000 for an early surrender of his 75-year lease, a Crown Estate report found that the property was so dilapidated and in need of repairs that in "all likelihood" Andrew "will not be owed any compensation". In October 2026, it was reported that Andrew had been entitled to £302,000 in compensation following the official surrender of the Royal Lodge lease, which ended more than 50 years before its scheduled expiry and within the first 25 years of the lease, making him eligible for compensation under its terms. However, the property incurred £1.8 million in repair and restoration costs, which exceeded the compensation due. The £302,000 was deducted from the repair bill, leaving £1.5 million payable to the Crown Estate that was provided by the King from his own private funds, meaning Andrew did not personally receive the compensation as a net payment.

Andrew vacated Royal Lodge in February 2026, relocating temporarily to Wood Farm on the Sandringham estate. In February 2026, Royal Lodge was searched by the police following Andrew's arrest on suspicion of misconduct in public office. In June 2026, it was revealed in a National Audit Office report that Andrew had received an undisclosed amount of rental income from sub‑letting three cottages on the Royal Lodge estate.
