= Elizabeth: The Unseen Queen =

British television programme

- Title screen
- Genre: Documentary film
- Directed by: Simon Finch
- Narrated by: Elizabeth II; Isabella Inchbald
- Composer: David Schweitzer
- Country of origin: United Kingdom
- Original language: English

Production
- Executive producer: Julia Harrington
- Producer: Simon Finch
- Editor: Mark Hammill
- Running time: 75 minutes
- Production company: BBC Studios

Original release
- Network: BBC One
- Release: 29 May 2022

Related
- The Coronation (2018)

Elizabeth: The Unseen Queen is a 2022 television documentary film of home movies shot by the British royal family. The film aired on BBC One on 29 May 2022, in commemoration of the Queen's Platinum Jubilee.

The film was compiled from 400 reels of previously unseen footage, that depict the Queen prior to her coronation.

A previous film of homemade films shot by the Queen, Prince Philip, Duke of Edinburgh, Princess Margaret, King George VI and Queen Elizabeth the Queen Mother had been broadcast as Elizabeth at 90: A Family Tribute in 2016.

The film contains the earliest known footage of the Queen in a pram in 1926. It also shows her playing with her sister in the grounds of Balmoral Castle and features footage from their trip to southern Africa with their parents onboard HMS Vanguard in 1947. The film depicts the Queen showing the camera her engagement ring prior to her 1947 wedding to Philip Mountbatten and later on shows her as a young mother with Prince Charles and Princess Anne.

== Reception ==
The Daily Telegraph gave it a five-star rating, commenting that the documentary "will make you feel closer to the Queen than ever before". Evening Standard also gave it a five-star rating, suggesting that "it's impossible to watch and listen without feeling a whiplash sense of existential vertigo as time seems to melt away and the old become young".

The Times, in its own five-star review, said that the film was "exquisitely put together" and parts of it "intensely moving".

The Independent gave it a four-star rating, commenting that "it's all rather sweet and quite moving for her loyal subjects. Sad to say, the programme has a valedictory air to it".
