= Elizabeth at 90: A Family Tribute =

- DVD cover
- Genre: Documentary film
- Directed by: John Bridcut
- Narrated by: Charles, Prince of Wales
- Composer: Edmund Jolliffe
- Country of origin: United Kingdom
- Original language: English

Production
- Executive producer: BBC
- Producer: John Bridcut
- Running time: 90 minutes

Original release
- Release: 21 April 2016

Related
- The Diamond Queen (2012); The Coronation (2018)

Elizabeth at 90: A Family Tribute is a 2016 television documentary film made to commemorate the 90th birthday of Queen Elizabeth II. It was produced by the BBC and directed by John Bridcut, and narrated by Charles, Prince of Wales. Aside from archive footage, the programme featured extensive footage shot by the Queen, Prince Philip, Duke of Edinburgh, Princess Margaret, King George VI and Queen Elizabeth the Queen Mother. The footage had never been publicly shown and came from the Queen's private archive of homemade films. The footage shown was interspersed with members of the British royal family commenting on the films. The film featured contributions from the Queen, the Prince of Wales, Anne, Princess Royal, Prince William, Duke of Cambridge, Prince Harry, Lady Sarah Chatto, Prince Edward, Duke of Kent, Princess Alexandra, Margaret Rhodes and Queen Margrethe II of Denmark.

== Reception ==
Elizabeth at 90 was positively received by critics.

Sam Wollaston, writing in The Guardian likened the film to a royal version of Gogglebox. Wollaston wrote that "While the Duke of Kent points out himself and other dukes, William and Harry admire the dresses and the jewels, Charles says wonderful a lot, the Queen says very little and Anne scowls. ...And fascinating because, whatever you think of them, this particular family does have a place in the history of this country. In some ways, as her eldest son says, the birthday girl's life has defined our age. Plus, it is a rare glimpse behind high walls, at the private life of a private family that really is nothing like anyone else's. And yes, some of it is touching, such as the young Elizabeth, as yet unburdened by her destiny, singing happily with her younger sister".

Writing in The Daily Telegraph, Gerard O'Donovan felt that it was "a triumph from start to finish. I cannot recall ever seeing a more charming, warm and – dare I say – human portrait of the Queen than this one...". O'Donovan wrote that the film "succeeded in blurring the boundary between public formality and private emotion...The result was a documentary that brilliantly sampled a full 90 years of a life both intensely public and guardedly private. A film that felt less like a tribute and more like a private view, and one you really didn't need to be a bonkers-mad Royalist to enjoy".
