= Conversation Piece at the Royal Lodge, Windsor =

1950 painting by Sir James Gunn

- Artist: Herbert James Gunn
- Year: 1950
- Medium: Oil on canvas
- Dimensions: 151.1 cm × 100.3 cm (59.5 in × 39.5 in)
- Location: National Portrait Gallery, London

Conversation Piece at the Royal Lodge, Windsor is an oil-on-canvas painting by Herbert James Gunn. It is part of the collection of the National Portrait Gallery (NPG) in London. The painting depicts King George VI and Queen Elizabeth and their daughters, Princesses Elizabeth and Margaret, taking tea in the Royal Lodge in Windsor Great Park. It was commissioned by the NPG in 1950.

== Background ==
The painting was commissioned by the trustees of the National Portrait Gallery (NPG) in London in 1950, and Herbert James Gunn was personally chosen by King George VI and Queen Elizabeth to paint the portrait. The fine-art photographer Paul Laib photographed Herbert James Gunn in the Drawing Room of Royal Lodge in 1950 during Gunn's preparations for the painting. Gunn's working sketch for the painting was part of Queen Elizabeth the Queen Mother's art collection at Clarence House.

== Description ==
The painting is an oil-on-canvas painting and measures 59 1/2 by 39 1/2 inches (151 by 100 cm). It depicts the British monarch King George VI with his consort Queen Elizabeth and their two daughters, Princesses Elizabeth and Margaret, taking afternoon tea in the Royal Lodge in Windsor Great Park. Paintings by John Wootton and Thomas Lawrence's portrait of King George IV are depicted on the wall of the Royal Lodge by Gunn. The room the painting depicts is the Drawing Room of the Royal Lodge, designed by Jeffry Wyatville. Gunn had difficulty placing Elizabeth's corgi dog in the setting of the portrait and so used a paper cut-out of the dog to move it around the canvas until he was satisfied with its setting.

The title of the painting refers to the conversation piece genre that is characterised by intimate portraits of small groups in social settings. The painting is representative of the informal style that was projected by the British royal family in the aftermath of the Second World War. They are shown taking tea in a way that would have been recognisable to all contemporary British people. The NPG notes that the painting's "domestic character demonstrates changes in perceptions of the monarchy".

== Reception and aftermath ==
In an article on new acquisitions by the NPG, The Times described the painting as "a fantastically painstaking if pedestrian record". In his autobiography A Mother's Disgrace, the Australian writer Robert Dessaix describes Conversation Piece as "superficially boring", and likens the domestic setting to "express[ing] an ideal of seemliness, good taste and bienseance" that people aspired to on the North Shore of Sydney in the 1950s.

The NPG did not possess a portrait of Queen Elizabeth II and so sought to approach the Queen through her private secretary, Martin Charteris, to ascertain her receptiveness to a successor painting to Gunn's Conversation Piece. The director of the NPG, Roy Strong, subsequently had lunch with the Queen in 1967 and wrote in his diary that "She denounced the James Gunn and also went on to say that she wouldn't allow a portrait, which has just been finished, to go to Scotland as it was too awful. Another made her into a midget". One of the trustees of the NPG, Lawrence Gowing, wrote to Strong to tell him that "The domestic arrangements of the Royal Family are steadily decreasing in public importance and the only excuse for representing them again would be if we got a really remarkable picture. That, for the moment, I do not see how we are to do. The very few good painters who are capable of it will not do it and the great painter who might is surely unacceptable to the Royal Family". The Italian artist Pietro Annigoni was eventually commissioned; his painting of the Queen, Her Majesty in Robes of the British Empire, was revealed in 1970.
