= Y Bwthyn Bach =

The Little Cottage
- Y Bwthyn Bach
- Location within Berkshire
- Alternative names: The Welsh Cottage

General information
- Type: Two-thirds scale cottage
- Architectural style: Eclectic, neoclassical
- Location: Royal Lodge, Windsor Great Park, England
- Coordinates: 51.43865°N 0.60616°W
- Current tenants: British royal family
- Inaugurated: 16 March 1932
- Owner: Charles III
- Landlord: Crown Estate

Dimensions
- Diameter: 24 ft × 8 ft (7.3 m × 2.4 m)
- Other dimensions: 5 ft-high (1.5 m) rooms

Technical details
- Floor count: 2

Design and construction
- Architect: Edmund Charles Morgan Willmott

Website
- www.rct.uk/collection/themes/exhibitions/royal-childhood/buckingham-palace/video-the-welsh-cottage

Y Bwthyn Bach (Welsh language for "The Little Cottage") is a royal wendy house standing close to Royal Lodge within Windsor Great Park in England since 1932. It was gifted to Princess Elizabeth (later Queen Elizabeth II) by the people of Wales and is now owned by King Charles III.

== History ==
The two-thirds scale thatched cottage was a gift to Princess Elizabeth, (later Queen Elizabeth II, though not a likely heir to the throne at the time) for her sixth birthday from the people of Wales. The cottage was assembled in Wales, then taken to the grounds of Royal Lodge in Windsor.

Designed by architect Edmund Willmott as a Welsh-cottage style playhouse, it is 24 feet (7.3 m) long, 8 feet (2.4 m) deep, with a ceiling height of 5 feet (1.5 m). Built from materials left over from the redevelopment of Llandough Hospital, it has four rooms: kitchen, living room, and upstairs a bedroom and a bathroom. Services include full running hot and cold water, electricity and a heated towel rail in the bathroom. The kitchen has a working fridge, gas cooker and a miniature blue and white porcelain dining and tea set. In the living room is a working miniature radio, a little oak dresser, a bookcase filled with Beatrix Potter's books, and a picture of Princess Elizabeth's mother, the Duchess of York hanging over the oak mantlepiece.

On 17 February 1932, an insurance policy for the house was taken out in the name of Princess Elizabeth of York. As the house was being transported from its construction site in the Welsh Valleys to Drill Hall, Cardiff, the tarpaulin covering it caught fire, damaging the cottage. Quickly repaired under the insurance policy, the house was presented to Elizabeth's parents Prince Albert, Duke of York and his wife on their visit to Greyfriars Hall, Cardiff, on 16 March 1932. The keys were presented to the royal couple by school girl Jean Blake, daughter of plumber and engineer William Blake, who helped to construct the cottage, on behalf of the Princess Elizabeth Model House Committee. Initially put on public display at the Daily Mail-sponsored Ideal Home Exhibition at the Olympia exhibition centre, London, it was then sent on a tour of the UK to raise funds for children's hospital charities. Fully repaired, it was sited on its final location close to Royal Lodge in Windsor Great Park; the princesses could to play in it from December 1933. Multiple generations have played in the playhouse as children, including Elizabeth and Margaret, Charles, Princess Beatrice and Princess Eugenie, and multiple "cousins and second cousins."

In 2012, as part of the Queen's Diamond Jubilee, the playhouse was restored under a plan initiated and managed by Princess Beatrice, paid for by her father Prince Andrew, Duke of York. Restored with a pale green and cream colour scheme, the works included new curtains and upholstery, the paintwork was refreshed, the roof was re-thatched and the cottage rewired.
