= Herbert James Gunn =

Scottish painter (1893–1964)

Sir Herbert James Gunn RA RP
- Born: 30 June 1893; Glasgow
- Died: 30 December 1964 (aged 71); London
- Education: Glasgow School of Art; Edinburgh College of Art; Académie Julian
- Known for: Landscape and portrait
- Spouses: Gwendoline Thorne (divorced); Pauline Miller
- Children: Paul Munro Gunn
- Patrons: Captain Edward Grindlay

Sir Herbert James Gunn RA RP (30 June 1893– 30 December 1964) was a Scottish landscape and portrait painter.

== Early life ==
Sir Herbert James Gunn (also known as Sir James Gunn) was born in Glasgow on 30 June 1893, the son of Richard Gunn, a draper, and Thomasina Munro. He studied for several years at the Glasgow School of Art and the Edinburgh College of Art. In 1911, he went to the Académie Julian in Paris where he studied under Jean-Paul Laurens. After he left Paris, Gunn travelled to Spain and then spent time in London, where he mostly painted landscapes. At the outbreak of the First World War, Gunn initially joined the Artists Rifles. He subsequently received a commission in the 10th Scottish Rifles and saw active service in France, where he met his friend and future patron, Edward Grindlay. During the conflict he continued to paint, most notably a work depicting troops on the eve of the Battle of the Somme.

== Painting career ==
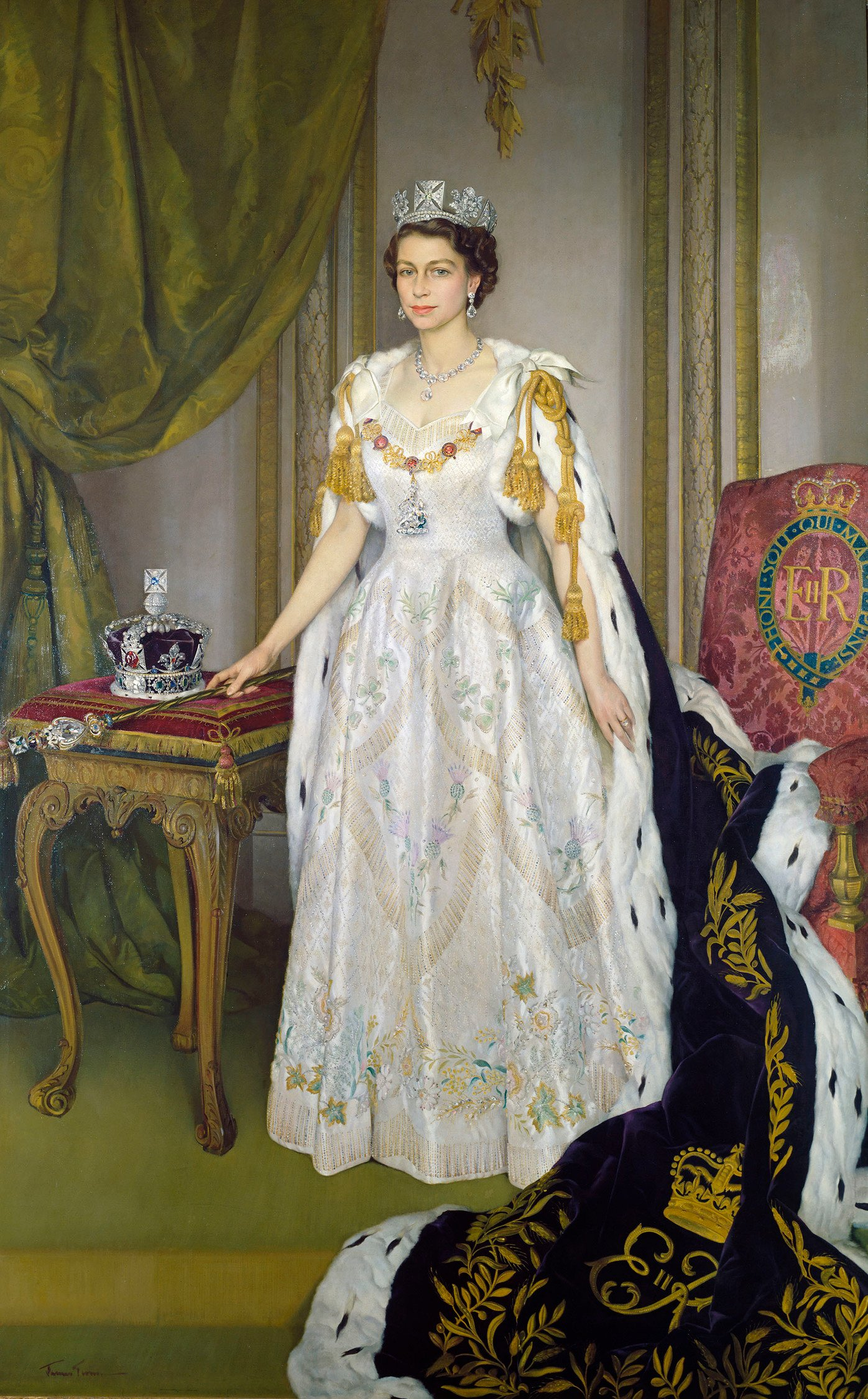
Queen Elizabeth II in Coronation Robes (1953)

Gunn began as a landscape painter and traveled widely, exhibiting Paintings of Rome etc at the Fine Art Society in 1929. During the 1920s, he increasingly concentrated on portrait painting and after 1929 he devoted himself exclusively to portraits. In November 1939, Gunn offered his services to the War Artists' Advisory Committee and subsequently received three portrait commissions from them.

During WWII he lived with his family in Carsethorn, a seaside village on the Solway in Kirkcudbrightshire.

Gunn's paintings are on show in a number of galleries and his 1953 portrait of Queen Elizabeth II is in the Royal Collection. His painting of the British royal family, Conversation Piece at the Royal Lodge, Windsor, was commissioned by the trustees of the National Portrait Gallery in 1950. He also painted notable portraits of King George V, Agnes Catherine Maitland (now in Somerville College's dining hall), and also of Harold Macmillan, in his role as Chancellor of Oxford University. He was elected President of the Royal Society of Portrait Painters in 1953, a post he held until his death. He was elected an associate member of the Royal Academy in 1953 and a full academician in 1961. Gunn was knighted for services to painting in 1963. An 80-page catalogue of his work which were exhibited at the Scottish National Portrait Gallery, Edinburgh from December 1994 to February 1995, was published by the National Galleries of Scotland in 1994.

== Family life ==
Gunn married Gwendoline Thorne in 1919 and they had three daughters. He divorced his first wife, who had run off with Sir Arthur Whinney. Gunn subsequently married Pauline Miller with whom he had a son and another daughter. Pauline was the model for a number of his paintings, including his 1961 diploma submission to the Royal Academy. Gunn died in London on 30 December 1964. A requiem mass for the repose of his soul was held at the Church of the Immaculate Conception, Farm Street, London in January 1965.
