= Douglas Whiteway =

Canadian journalist and author (born 1961)

Douglas Alfred Whiteway (born 1961) is a Canadian journalist and author who lives in Winnipeg, Manitoba. He has a BA in Religious Studies from the University of Manitoba, and a degree in journalism from Carleton University in Ottawa. He has worked for the Winnipeg Tribune and the Winnipeg Free Press.

Under the pen-name "C. C. Benison," he is the author of a series of murder mysteries set on the estates of Queen Elizabeth II where the crimes are solved by housemaid Jane Bee, with the Queen's help. Titles include Death at Buckingham Palace, Death at Sandringham House, and Death at Windsor Castle. He is also the author of Death in Cold Type, a murder mystery set in Winnipeg.

Death at Buckingham Palace has been translated into several languages: into Japanese as Bakkingamu Kyūden no satsujin in 1998, into German as Mord im Buckingham-Palast in 1997, into Spanish in 1999 as Muerte en el Palacio de Buckingham. Death at Sandringham House has been translated into German as Mord auf Schloss Sandringham: ein königlicher Kriminalroman, and Death at Windsor Castle into Japanese as Uinzājō no himitsu.

With Barbara Huck he co-authored In Search of Ancient Alberta (Winnipeg: Heartland Publications, 1998).

He was associate editor of The Beaver, a Canadian history magazine, from 1998 to 2006. He later became editor of The Beaver. He was Writer in Residence for the Winnipeg Public Library in 2007/08.

In the autumn of 2011, Benison published Twelve Drummers Drumming, the first of a series of crime novels inspired by the Christmas carol, The Twelve Days of Christmas. The mystery series follows Father Tom Christmas, a priest in an English village, who often stumbles upon murder. The second, Eleven Pipers Piping, was published in October 2012. The third, Ten Lords A'Leaping, was published in December 2013. In October 2018, he published Paul is Dead: A Novel, a psychological thriller. In the autumn of 2020, a non-canonical Father Christmas mystery, a novella, The Unpleasantness at the Battle of Thornford was published.
