= The Diamond Queen (TV programme) =

British TV documentary series

- Genre: Documentary
- Directed by: Sally Norris
- Presented by: Andrew Marr
- Country of origin: United Kingdom
- Original language: English
- No. of series: 1
- No. of episodes: 3

Production
- Executive producer: Nick Vaughan-Barratt
- Producer: Sally Norris
- Running time: 60 minutes
- Production company: BBC

Original release
- Network: BBC One
- Release: 6 February – 20 February 2012

The Diamond Queen is a BBC documentary series, presented by Andrew Marr, which looks at the life of Queen Elizabeth II. The series focuses on her accession, her daily routine, how she is seen as a role model, and how she coped in her 60th year as monarch. The programme features archive footage of the Queen, as well as in-depth footage of her major engagements since the beginning of 2010 to late 2011.

== Programmes ==
| # | Title | Original airdate | Directed by | Duration | Viewers |
|---|---|---|---|---|---|
| 1 | Episode 1 | 6 February 2012 | Sally Norris | 60 minutes | 7.2 million |
In the opening episode of the series, Marr looks at the Queen's relationship between her parents, grandparents and uncle as well as her relationship with the government and with the current and previous prime ministers. He follows the Queen as she tours the United States and the Middle East and visits the Queen's Wendy House Y Bwthyn Bach, received as a present on her sixth birthday and recently restored.
| 2 | Episode 2 | 13 February 2012 | Sally Noris | 60 minutes | 6.5 million |
In this episode, Marr assesses the Queen's attempts to modernise the monarchy, including the wedding of Prince William and Catherine Middleton. Princes William and Harry are interviewed about their grandmother's influence on the day. The challenges faced by the monarchy are also reviewed, such as the 1992 'annus horribilis". Marr follows the Queen on her visit to Ireland in 2011, and remembers the happy times she enjoyed on the Royal Yacht Britannia, before – to her visual sadness – it was decommissioned in 1997 by Tony Blair.
| 3 | Episode 3 | 20 February 2012 | Sally Norris | 60 minutes | 6.8 million |
In the final episode, the defining moments of the Queen's reign are covered, starting with her accession to the throne in 1952 until her coronation sixteen months later. Marr follows her trip to Australia to look at what he opines is her most enduring achievement, the Commonwealth, looks back upon her Silver and Golden Jubilees in 1977 and 2002 respectively, and comments on how she has coped with changing and occasionally tense relations with the media. Also touched upon is how she coped with the deaths of her mother and sister within weeks of each other in the run up to her Golden Jubilee, and the entire range of her adult grandchildren have their say about the Queen.

== Critical reception ==
The Diamond Queen series reached an audience of 7.2 million UK viewers for the first episode and 6.5 and 6.8 million for the next episodes. It achieved an Audience Appreciation Index of 90 out of 100 for each episode; a higher than average rating. The series has since been broadcast around the world.

The documentary was criticised by the campaign group Republic. Graham Smith, the organisation's chief executive, argued in a letter to the chairman of the BBC Trust, Chris Patten, that the programme breached BBC guidelines on impartiality. Smith wrote in his letter that the series was subject to "distortions, half-truths and fabrications" and commented, "What was presented as a piece of biographical journalism was in fact pro-monarchy polemic". A BBC spokeswoman responded that, "The BBC abides by its requirement to be duly impartial across its output."
