= Jennifer Robson =

Canadian writer (born 1970)

Jennifer Robson (born January 5, 1970) is a Canadian author of historical fiction.

== Biography ==
Jennifer Robson was born January 5, 1970, in Peterborough, Ontario. Her father was a historian and her mother was a lawyer and judge. She became interested in history when she was still a student; when she was a teenager, her parents gave her a copy of Vera Brittain's war memoir Testament of Youth and she has reread it several times since.

She graduated from King's College, University of Western Ontario and St. Antony's College, Oxford, where she received a Ph.D. She is a former Commonwealth Scholar and SSHRC Doctoral Fellow, Oxford University. She worked as a copywriter and editor in magazine and newspaper publishing.

Robson writes historical fiction set in the 20th century. She plots her novels in advance of writing.

The Gown (2018) and Our Darkest Night (2021) received starred reviews from Publishers Weekly. The review of Our Darkest Night said, "Robson (The Gown) shines with this stellar WWII story" and "The brutal reality and atrocities of war are on full view with devastating clarity. Expert characterizations and perfect pacing are rounded out by lyrical prose". The Gown was called "a satisfying multigenerational epic" and noted "Robson’s meticulous attention to historical details—notably the intricacies of the embroidery work—is a wonderful complement to the memorable stories of Ann and Miriam, making for a winning, heartwarming tale". Publishers Weekly wrote that in Moonlight over Paris (2016), "Robson's historical research is evident in her great attention to detail, adding realism to a magnetic novel that's complete with actual historical figures". Publishers Weekly mentioned 2023 novel Coronation Year's slow start, but noted "Robson ramps up the action" and "Robson adds intriguing supporting characters to the mix".

Kirkus Reviews gave a critical review to Moonlight over Paris, saying Robson " delivers a dim tale devoid of moonlight". Kirkus called The Gown (2018) "A fascinating glimpse into the world of design, the healing power of art, and the importance of women’s friendships".

Robson is married and has two children.

== Selected works ==
- Goodnight from London. William Morrow, 2017. ISBN 9780062675576
- The Gown. William Morrow, 2018. ISBN 9780062884275
- Our Darkest Night. William Morrow, 2021. ISBN 9780063059405
- Coronation Year. 2023. ISBN 9780063297104

=== The Great War series ===
- Somewhere in France. William Morrow, 2013. ISBN 9780062273451
- After the War is Over. William Morrow, 2014. ISBN 9781629533179
- Moonlight Over Paris. William Morrow, 2016. ISBN 9780062389824
