= Queen Camilla (novel) =

2006 novel by Sue Townsend

- First edition
- Author: Sue Townsend
- Language: English
- Publisher: Penguin Books
- Publication date: 2006
- Publication place: United Kingdom
- Preceded by: The Queen and I

Queen Camilla is a satirical novel by the British author Sue Townsend.

It was published in the UK on 26 October 2006 by Penguin Books and is a sequel to her novel The Queen and I. Most of the Hell Close neighbours from the earlier novel are also in the subsequent book.

== Plot summary ==
It follows Queen Elizabeth II, Charles, Prince of Wales and his wife, Camilla, Duchess of Cornwall, who, at the start of the novel, have been living for the last 13 years on the Flowers Estate, now called the Flowers Exclusion Zone or 'The Fez'. The Fez is the private fiefdom of scaffolding magnate Arthur Grice, Prince William's employer. Grice fancies himself a grand-scale public benefactor; he often wonders why most Fez residents dismiss him as little more than the self-aggrandising businessman he is. He lobbies the Queen for a knighthood, which she cannot grant him, all honours having been abolished.

The exclusion zones are the worst sign of the authoritarian country Britain has become, with almost lock-down security in the Fez. Jack Barker, Cromwell (formerly People's Republican) Party leader and prime minister, is exhausted after 13 years in office, and wants out. The New Conservative ("New Con") Party elects "Boy" English as its new leader; Boy promises to restore the monarchy.

The Queen, now 80, does not want to return to public life; she tells her family she has decided to abdicate. One reason: the Duke of Edinburgh, her husband, suffered a debilitating stroke two years earlier, and is now being (badly) cared for in a nursing home in another part of the Fez. With the Queen's abdication, the Prince of Wales will now become King Charles III – but Camilla will only be his consort, not his queen. Charles refuses to become king unless Camilla is his queen. Prince William then offers, too eagerly for the Queen's liking, to reign in his father's place. Charles consults his friend, MP Nicholas Soames, who tells him there is no constitutional reason Camilla cannot become his queen.

Enter Graham Cracknall, who claims to be the son of Charles and Camilla, born in 1965. His adoptive parents revealed his biological parentage in a codicil to their will, opened only after both had died. Graham visits Charles and Camilla; the whole family takes an instant dislike to him – particularly after he claims that he, not Prince William, is second in line to the throne after Charles. Graham then attracts the online attention of a mysterious lady named Miranda – who, unknown to him, is a New Con operative in the General Election that is finally called. On learning of the New Con ruse, the enraged Graham goes to the Daily Telegraph with his story; he is not believed, causes a disturbance when thrown out, and ends up in Rampton Hospital. The New Cons win the election, restoring the monarchy as promised, but the Queen follows through on her decision to abdicate, and Charles accedes as king with Camilla as queen. However, the New Cons effectively turn Buckingham Palace into a human zoo, with tourists watching the everyday routine of royals in a form of captivity.
