= The Queen and I (novel) =

1992 novel by Sue Townsend

- First edition
- Author: Sue Townsend
- Illustrator: Martin Honeysett
- Language: English
- Publisher: Methuen
- Publication date: 1992
- Publication place: United Kingdom
- Pages: 239
- ISBN: 0-413-65000-6
- Followed by: Queen Camilla

The Queen and I is a 1992 novel and play written by Sue Townsend, a fictional best-selling political satire revolving round the topic of republicanism in the United Kingdom.

== Plot ==
The novel begins in 1992, set just after the general election of the same year, where the House of Windsor has just been deprived of its royal status by the People's Republican Party, and its members made to live as normal citizens.

After a People's Republican Party government is elected by the British people, who were influenced by subliminal messages sent through their TV sets by members of the television technicians' union manipulated by Jack Barker, the Royal Family has to leave Buckingham Palace and must move to a council estate. Barker, as the new prime minister, transforms Britain into a republic and dismantles the monarchy.

In Hellebore Close (aptly known as "Hell Close" to its longtime residents), the new home of the Royal Family, they learn to cope with the normal day of ordinary people. The Queen – now called Mrs. Windsor – is not allowed to take all her beloved corgis to her new home in "Hell Close", with only Harris with her, and Charles learning that horses cannot be kept in a council house garden.

The Queen is visited by a social worker, but refuses to let her in. She learns how to use a zip and buttons, and that five hours of waiting to see a doctor in an ordinary hospital is not unusual when she injures herself opening tinned beef; Princess Margaret mistakes the injured Queen for a dead one and believes they're all going to be killed. The Queen learns that living on a small pensioner's income is difficult, and that she must organise her budget to fit.

Nonetheless, the Queen quickly learns to cope with the situation, and later does not wish to return to Buckingham Palace due to the duties that would await her there, should she return to her former royal status.

Her husband, Prince Philip, conversely struggles with the situation, refusing to eat, share a bed with his wife, and wishing he were anywhere but in Hellebore Close.

Charles, former Prince of Wales, discovers his great love for gardening. While he and his wife Diana, Princess of Wales, begin affairs with their neighbours, their children, William and Harry, do not recognise the situation they are in, thinking the whole thing to be an adventure.

Later, Charles is imprisoned and sentenced for attacking a police officer, a crime he did not actually commit. His sister, Princess Anne takes up with a local handyman. Prince Andrew is briefly mentioned to be serving aboard a Royal Navy submarine under the Arctic ice cap.

Their neighbours, who are at first sceptical, eventually include the ex-royal family in their community, and help them as much as their own circumstances allow. Although the Queen Mother is the oldest of the ex-royals, she learns very fast how to cope with the new situation, but even in the poor circumstances of Hellebore Close, cannot stop herself from betting on horses. Her death shakes the whole neighbourhood and everyone takes part in her cheap but solemn funeral. A disgruntled fishmonger and his wife start a campaign to "Bring Our Monarch Back", under the acronym 'B.O.M.B'.

Jack Barker and his so-called "Kitchen Cabinet" make election promises to voters that would cause great expense, such as promising to raise pensions and renew schools, and soon get into trouble with foreign creditors. After talks with the Japanese emperor, Barker announces that Britain is to become part of the Japanese Empire, with himself as Governor-General. In return, all repayments to Japan are to be suspended indefinitely. This agreement is sealed by the marriage of Edward, the Queen's youngest son, to Sayako, daughter of the Emperor.

It is then revealed the events were a nightmare. The Queen wakes to find that the Conservatives have won the election instead, as indeed actually happened, and John Major has remained prime minister.

In 2006, a sequel, Queen Camilla, was published. The novel ignores the revelation that Hellebore Close was all a dream, and begins with the royal family as still living there, with Jack Barker still in power.

== Characters ==
=== Royal Family ===
- Queen Elizabeth II
- Prince Philip, Duke of Edinburgh
- Queen Elizabeth the Queen Mother
- Charles, Prince of Wales
- Diana, Princess of Wales
- Prince William
- Prince Harry
- Anne, Princess Royal
- Peter Phillips
- Zara Phillips
- Prince Edward. Edward is absent for most of the novel, being in New Zealand producing a play. He appears at the end of the book when he is forced into marrying the Japanese Princess Sayako.
- Princess Margaret, Countess of Snowdon
- Harris, the Queen's corgi, who is hijacked along with Prince Edward at the marriage of Edward and Sayako.

=== New Parliament ===
- Jack Barker, the Prime Minister.
- Pat Barker, his wife.
- Rosetta Higgins, Jack's personal secretary.

=== Hellebore Close Residents ===
- Tony Threadgold, the Queen's new neighbour.
- Beverley Threadgold, his wife.
- Violet Toby, one of Diana's neighbours.
- Wilfred 'Wilf' Toby, her fifth husband.
- Marilyn Monk, Beverley's sister and Diana's other neighbour.
- Leslie Kerry Violet Elizabeth Monk, the child of Marilyn and her imprisoned husband, Les.
- Philomena Toussaint, the Queen Mother's neighbour.
- Fitzroy Toussaint, Philomena's son and a possible flame of Diana's.
- Spiggy, a short man who fitted the carpets for the Queen and starts a relationship with Princess Anne.
- Mr. and Winnie Christmas, the parents of Lee Christmas.
- Lee Christmas, one of the Christmas brother's and cellmate of Prince Charles. Brother to Craig, Wayne, Darren, Barry, Mario and Engelbert.
- Mandy Carter, mother of Shadow and neighbour of Diana.
- Shadow Carter, Mandy's son.

=== The Pack ===
- King, the pack leader. Mandy Carter's German Shepherd, who is killed by a van delivering Pot Noodles to Food-U-R.
- Raver, the deputy leader.
- Kylie, the pack 'bitch'. A collie dog that becomes pregnant by Harris.
- Lovejoy, Mick and Duffy, regular members.

=== Others ===
- Detective Inspector Denton Holyland, the policeman in charge at Hell Close.
- Police Constable Isaiah Ludlow, the policeman who took Prince Charles, Beverley Threadgold and Violet Toby to Court.
- Trish McPherson, the social worker at Hell Close.
- David Dorken, the man from the DSS.
- Victor Berryman, owner of the local 'Food-U-R' supermarket.
- Mrs. Berryman, Victor's agoraphobic wife.
- Mrs. Maundy, one of the two cashiers at Food-U-R.
- Mrs. Butterworth, a member of the Young Mother's Association that visited 10 Downing Street.
- Eric Tremaine, the founder member of the B.O.M.B (Bring Back Our Monarchy) foundation.
- Lobelia Tremaine, his wife.
- Barry, the Hell Close milkman.
- Princess Sayako, the Japanese Princess who marries Prince Edward at the end.
- Fat Oswald, one of Charles's prison cellmates.
- Carlton Moses, another of Charles's cellmates, who allegedly sold his grandmother for a car.
- Gordon Fossdyke, the prison Governor.
- Mr. Pike, Charles's prison escort to the Queen Mother's funeral.

== TV adaptation ==
In 2018, the book was adapted as a Christmas special on Sky One.
