= The Queen and I (2018 film) =

- Based on: The Queen and I by Sue Townsend
- Directed by: Dan Zeff
- Starring: Samantha Bond; Oliver Chris; Amanda Abbington; Julia McKenzie; Frances Barber
- Country of origin: United Kingdom
- Original language: English

Original release
- Network: Sky One
- Release: 24 December 2018

The Queen and I is a 2018 British TV film comedy drama directed by Dan Zeff, based on a 1992 novel/play of the same name written by Sue Townsend, adapted as a Christmas special on Sky One, released on Christmas Eve.

== Cast ==
- Samantha Bond as Queen Elizabeth II
- Oliver Chris as Prince Charles
- Amanda Abbington as Princess Anne
- Julia McKenzie as Queen Elizabeth The Queen Mother
- Frances Barber as Princess Margaret
- David Walliams as Jack Barker
- Noah Bailey as Prince Harry
- Johnny Vegas as Spiggy
- Woody Melbourne as Prince William
- Ellen Thomas as Philomena
- Kathryn Drysdale as Trish Welling
- Bronwyn James as WPC Ludlow
