= The Coronation (film) =

- Genre: Documentary film
- Narrated by: Keeley Hawes
- Country of origin: United Kingdom
- Original language: English

Production
- Running time: 60 minutes
- Production company: Atlantic Productions

Original release
- Network: BBC One
- Release: 14 January 2018

The Coronation is a 2018 British television documentary made to commemorate the Sapphire Jubilee of Elizabeth II, the 65th anniversary of the coronation of Elizabeth II.

It was broadcast on BBC One in the United Kingdom on 14 January 2018. The documentary also aired on the Smithsonian Channel in the United States on the same day, and was shown on ABC in Australia on 4 February 2018. It was made by Atlantic Productions and distributed by FremantleMedia International.

In the hour-long documentary, Queen Elizabeth II speaks candidly to Alastair Bruce of Crionaich, royal commentator for Sky News, about her experience of the coronation and some of the Crown Jewels used in the ceremony. The Queen had never been interviewed on camera, and the exchange, which often seemed like an interview, was officially described as a "conversation".
