= List of films about British royalty =

Listed films are biographical films and documentary films in which the main subject is one or more members of the British royal family. This includes the preceding English and Scottish royal families and fictional British royal families. It does not include films in which members of the royal family only play supporting roles. It is limited to films with articles on Wikipedia.

== Biographic films ==
Title	Director	Release date	Subject	Top Billing	Notes	Ref
The Execution of Mary Stuart	Alfred Clark	28 August 1895	Mary, Queen of Scots		Silent short film	
The Coronation of Edward VII	Georges Méliès	9 August 1902	Edward VII		Silent short film	
Henry VIII	Will Barker	1911	Henry VIII	Arthur Bourchier as Henry VIII	Silent film	
Les Amours de la reine Élisabeth	Louis Mercanton; Henri Desfontaines	12 July 1912	Elizabeth I	Sarah Bernhardt as Queen Elizabeth I	Silent film	
Richard III	André Calmettes; James Keane	15 October 1912	Richard III	Frederick Warde as Richard, Duke of Gloucester	Silent film	
Sixty Years a Queen	Bert Haldane	November 1913	Victoria	Blanche Forsythe as Queen Victoria; Louie Henri as Queen Victoria	Silent film	
Anna Boleyn	Ernst Lubitsch	3 December 1920	Henry VIII	Henny Porten as Anna Boleyn; Emil Jannings as Henry VIII	Silent film	
When Knighthood Was in Flower	Robert G. Vignola	21 September 1922	Mary Tudor	Marion Davies as Mary Tudor	Silent film	
The Virgin Queen	J. Stuart Blackton	23 January 1923	Elizabeth I	Diana Manners as Queen Elizabeth I	Silent film	
The Loves of Mary, Queen of Scots	Denison Clift	October 1923	Mary, Queen of Scots	Fay Compton as Mary, Queen of Scots	Silent film	
The Virgin Queen	R. William Neill	12 May 1928	Elizabeth I	Aileen Manning as Queen Elizabeth I	Silent film	
Henry the Ache	Ray McCarey	26 January 1924	Henry VIII	Bert Lahr as King Henry VIII; Janet Reade as Catherine Howard		
A Princess of Destiny	Tom Terriss	4 May 1929	Henry VIII	Anders Randolf as Henry VIII; Doris Lloyd as Anne Boleyn; Dorothy Gould as Jane Seymour	Lost silent short film	
The Private Life of Henry VIII	Alexander Korda	17 August 1933	Henry VIII	Charles Laughton as Henry VIII		
Victoria in Dover	Erich Engel	28 February 1936	Victoria	Jenny Jugo as Princess Victoria	German language film	
Mary of Scotland	John Ford	28 August 1936	Mary, Queen of Scots	Katharine Hepburn as Mary, Queen of Scots		
Tudor Rose	Robert Stevenson	1 September 1936	Lady Jane Grey	Cedric Hardwicke as The Earl of Warwick; Nova Pilbeam as Lady Jane Grey		
Fire Over England	William K. Howard	5 March 1937	Elizabeth I	Flora Robson as Queen Elizabeth I		
Victoria the Great	Herbert Wilcox	16 September 1937	Victoria	Anna Neagle as Queen Victoria		
Sixty Glorious Years	Herbert Wilcox	14 October 1938	Victoria	Anna Neagle as Queen Victoria		
The Private Lives of Elizabeth and Essex	Michael Curtiz	11 November 1939	Elizabeth I	Bette Davis as Queen Elizabeth I		
Entente cordiale	Marcel L'Herbier	3 April 1939	Edward VII	Victor Francen as King Edward VII; Gaby Morlay as Queen Victoria	French language film	
Das Herz der Königin	Carl Froelich	1940	Mary, Queen of Scots	Zarah Leander as Mary, Queen of Scots	German language film	
Henry V	Laurence Olivier	22 November 1944	Henry V	Laurence Olivier as King Henry V		
The Mudlark	Jean Negulesco	30 October 1950	Victoria	Irene Dunne as Queen Victoria		
Young Bess	George Sidney	21 May 1953	Elizabeth I	Jean Simmons as Young Bess		
The Sword and the Rose	Ken Annakin	23 July 1953	Mary Tudor	Glynis Johns as Mary Tudor		
Victoria in Dover	Ernst Marischka	16 December 1954	Victoria	Romy Schneider as Princess Victoria	German language film	
The Virgin Queen	Henry Koster	22 July 1955	Elizabeth I	Bette Davis as Queen Elizabeth I		
Richard III	Laurence Olivier	13 December 1955	Richard III	Laurence Olivier as Richard, Duke of Gloucester; Cedric Hardwicke as King Edward IV		
Victoria Regina	George Schaefer	30 November 1961	Victoria	Julie Harris as Queen Victoria	Part of the Hallmark Hall of Fame anthology	
Tower of London	Roger Corman	24 October 1962	Richard III	Vincent Price as Richard, Duke of Gloucester		
Becket	Peter Glenville	11 March 1964	Henry II	Peter O'Toole as King Henry II		
Elizabeth the Queen	George Schaefer	1968	Elizabeth I	Judith Anderson as Queen Elizabeth I	Television film	
The Lion in Winter	Anthony Harvey	30 October 1968	Henry II	Peter O'Toole as King Henry II		
Anne of the Thousand Days	Charles Jarrott	18 December 1969	Henry VIII	Richard Burton as King Henry VIII; Geneviève Bujold as Anne Boleyn; Irene Papas as Queen Catherine of Aragon		
Carry On Henry	Gerald Thomas	17 February 1971	Henry VIII	Sid James as King Henry VIII	Part of the Carry On series	
Mary, Queen of Scots	Charles Jarrott	22 December 1971	Mary, Queen of Scots	Vanessa Redgrave as Mary, Queen of Scots		
Henry VIII and His Six Wives	Waris Hussein	13 July 1972	Henry VIII	Keith Michell as Henry VIII		
Charles & Diana: A Royal Love Story	James Goldstone	1982	Charles III	David Robb as Charles, Prince of Wales; Caroline Bliss as Diana, Princess of Wales	Television film	
The Royal Romance of Charles and Diana	Peter Levin	1982	Charles III	Catherine Oxenberg as Diana, Princess of Wales; Christopher Baines as Charles, Prince of Wales	Television film	
Lady Jane	Trevor Nunn	7 February 1986	Lady Jane Grey	Helena Bonham Carter as Lady Jane Grey		
Henry V	Kenneth Branagh	8 November 1989	Henry V	Kenneth Branagh as King Henry V		
Diana: Her True Story (film)	Andrew Morton	1993	Diana, Princess of Wales	Serena Scott Thomas as Diana, Princess of Wales	Television film	
The Madness of King George	Nicholas Hytner	30 December 1994	George III	Nigel Hawthorne as King George III		
Willi und die Windzors		1996	Elizabeth II	Irm Hermann as Queen Elizabeth II	German language television film	
Mrs Brown	John Madden	18 July 1997	Victoria	Judi Dench as Queen Victoria		
Elizabeth	Shekhar Kapur	6 November 1998	Elizabeth I	Cate Blanchett as Queen Elizabeth I		
Diana: A Tribute to the People's Princess	Gabrielle Beaumont	1998	Diana, Princess of Wales	Amy Seccombe as Diana, Princess of Wales	Television film	
Monarch	John Walsh	2000	Henry VIII	T. P. McKenna as King Henry VIII		
Bertie and Elizabeth	Giles Foster	2002	George VI	James Wilby as King George VI; Juliet Aubrey as Queen Elizabeth	Television film	
The Other Boleyn Girl	Philippa Lowthorpe	28 March 2003	Henry VIII	Natascha McElhone as Mary Boleyn; Jodhi May as Anne Boleyn; Jared Harris as King Henry VIII	Television film	
The Lion in Winter	James Goldman	26 December 2003	Henry II	Patrick Stewart as King Henry II	Television film	
Whatever Love Means	David Blair	2005	Charles III	Laurence Fox as Charles, Prince of Wales; Olivia Poulet as Camilla Parker Bowles	Television film	
Diana: The Rose Conspiracy	Martín Sastre	2005	Diana, Princess of Wales	Denise Watson as Diana, Princess of Wales	Short film	
The Queen's Sister	Craig Warner	2005	Princess Margaret, Countess of Snowdon	Lucy Cohu as Princess Margaret	Television film	
The Queen	Stephen Frears	14 September 2006	Elizabeth II	Helen Mirren as Queen Elizabeth II		
Diana: Last Days of a Princess	Richard Dale	12 August 2007	Diana, Princess of Wales	Genevieve O'Reilly as Diana, Princess of Wales	Television film	
Elizabeth: The Golden Age	Shekhar Kapur	12 October 2007	Elizabeth I	Cate Blanchett as Queen Elizabeth I		
The Other Boleyn Girl	Justin Chadwick	29 February 2008	Henry VIII	Natalie Portman as Anne Boleyn; Scarlett Johansson as Mary Boleyn; Eric Bana as King Henry VIII		
The Young Victoria	Jean-Marc Vallée	6 March 2009	Victoria	Emily Blunt as Queen Victoria		
The Taking of Prince Harry		21 October 2010	Prince Harry, Duke of Sussex	Sam Reid as Prince Harry, Duke of Sussex	Television film	
The King's Speech	Tom Hooper	26 November 2010	George VI	Colin Firth as King George VI		
William & Kate: The Movie	Mark Rosman	2011	William, Prince of Wales	Nico Evers-Swindell as William, Duke of Cambridge; Camilla Luddington as Catherine, Duchess of Cambridge	Television film	
William & Catherine: A Royal Romance	Linda Yellen	2011	William, Prince of Wales	Dan Amboyer as William, Duke of Cambridge; Alice St Clair as Catherine, Duchess of Cambridge	Television film	
Mary Queen of Scots	Thomas Imbach	12 November 2014	Mary, Queen of Scots	Camille Rutherford as Mary, Queen of Scots	English and French language film	
Diana	Oliver Hirschbiegel	26 September 2013	Diana, Princess of Wales	Naomi Watts as Diana, Princess of Wales		
Monarch	John Walsh	14 September 2014	Henry VIII	T. P. McKenna as Henry VIII		
A Royal Night Out	Julian Jarrold	14 May 2015	Elizabeth II	Sarah Gadon as Princess Elizabeth		
King Charles III	Rupert Goold	10 May 2017	Charles III	Tim Pigott-Smith as King Charles III	Television film	
Victoria & Abdul	Stephen Frears	3 September 2017	Victoria	Judi Dench as Queen Victoria; Ali Fazal as Abdul Karim		
Harry & Meghan: A Royal Romance	Menhaj Huda	13 May 2018	Harry, Duke of Sussex	Murray Fraser as Prince Harry, Duke of Sussex; Tiffany Smith as Meghan, Duchess of Sussex	Television film	
Outlaw King	David Mackenzie	9 November 2018	Robert the Bruce	Chris Pine as Robert the Bruce		
Mary Queen of Scots	Josie Rourke	7 December 2018	Mary, Queen of Scots	Saoirse Ronan as Mary, Queen of Scots		
The Favourite	Yorgos Lanthimos	21 December 2018	Anne	Olivia Colman as Queen Anne		
The Queen and I	Dan Zeff	24 December 2018	Elizabeth II	Samantha Bond as Queen Elizabeth II	Television film	
Harry & Meghan: Becoming Royal	Menhaj Huda	27 May 2019	Harry, Duke of Sussex	Charlie Field as Prince Harry, Duke of Sussex; Tiffany Smith as Meghan, Duchess of Sussex	Television film	
The King	David Michôd	17 October 2019	Henry V	Timothée Chalamet as King Henry V		
Harry & Meghan: Escaping the Palace	Menhaj Huda	6 September 2021	Harry, Duke of Sussex	Jordan Dean as Prince Harry, Duke of Sussex; Sydney Morton as Meghan, Duchess of Sussex	Television film	
Spencer	Pablo Larraín	5 November 2021	Diana, Princess of Wales	Kristen Stewart as Diana, Princess of Wales		
Firebrand	Karim Aïnouz	21 May 2023	Henry VIII	Alicia Vikander as Katherine Parr; Jude Law as Henry VIII		

== Fictional characters ==
Title	Director	Release date	Top Billing	Notes	Ref
King Ralph	David S. Ward	15 February 1991	John Goodman as Ralph Jones		
The Queen's Corgi	Ben Stassen; Vincent Kesteloot	14 February 2019	Jack Whitehall as Rex the royal corgi	Animated film	
Red, White & Royal Blue	Matthew López	11 August 2023	Nicholas Galitzine as Prince Henry		

== Documentary ==
Title	Director	Release date	Subject	Notes	Ref
With Our King and Queen Through India		2 February 1912	King George V's coronation as Emperor of India	Silent film, partially lost	
Royal Journey	David Bairstow; Gudrun Parker; Roger Blais	21 December 1951	Queen Elizabeth II; Prince Philip, Duke of Edinburgh		
A Queen Is Crowned	Michael Waldman	2 June 1953	Queen Elizabeth II		
The Queen in Australia	Stanley Hawes	1954	Queen Elizabeth II		
The England of Elizabeth	John Taylor	1957	Queen Elizabeth I		
A King's Story	Harry Booth	1965	King Edward VIII		
The Royal Tour of the Caribbean		1966	Queen Elizabeth II		
Royal Family	Richard Cawston	21 June 1969	Queen Elizabeth II	Television film	
Elizabeth R: A Year in the Life of the Queen	Edward Mirzoeff	6 February 1992	Queen Elizabeth II	Television film	
Charles: The Private Man, the Public Role		29 June 1994	King Charles III	Television film	
Looking for Victoria	Louise Osmond	2003	Queen Victoria	Television film	
Britain's Real Monarch		3 January 2004	George Plantagenet, Duke of Clarence	Television film	
Unlawful Killing	Keith Allen	13 May 2011	Diana, Princess of Wales		
Elizabeth at 90: A Family Tribute	John Bridcut	21 April 2016	Queen Elizabeth II	Television film	
Diana, Our Mother: Her Life and Legacy	Ashley Gething	24 July 2017	Diana, Princess of Wales	Television film	
Diana: In Her Own Words		6 August 2017	Diana, Princess of Wales	Television film	
The Story of Diana	Rebecca Gitlitz-Rapoport	August 2017	Diana, Princess of Wales	Television film	
Diana, 7 Days	Henry Singer	27 August 2017	Diana, Princess of Wales	Television film	
The Coronation		14 January 2018	Queen Elizabeth II	Television film	
The Princess		19 January 2022	Diana, Princess of Wales		
Elizabeth: A Portrait in Parts	Roger Michell	27 May 2022	Queen Elizabeth II		
Elizabeth: The Unseen Queen	Simon Finch	29 May 2022	Queen Elizabeth II	Television film	
Charles R: The Making of a Monarch		30 April 2023	King Charles III	Television film	
Frankie Boyle's Farewell to the Monarchy		30 April 2023	Various	Television film	
Charles III: The Coronation Year	Ashley Gething	26 December 2023	King Charles III	Television film	

== See also ==
- List of works based on Arthurian legends#Film
- Macbeth on screen
