= Will Wyatt =

British television executive (born 1942)

Will Wyatt CBE
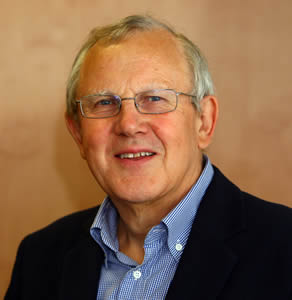
- Will Wyatt in 2011
- Born: Alan Will Wyatt; January 7, 1942 (age 83); Oxford
- Education: Magdalen College School, Oxford
- Alma mater: University of Cambridge
- Employer(s): BBC; Sheffield Telegraph
- Spouse: Jane Bagenal (m. 1966)

(Alan) Will Wyatt CBE (born 7 January 1942) is a retired media consultant, author and managing director. He served as director of BBC Television from 1991 to 1996 and Chief Executive of BBC Broadcast from 1996 to 1999.

== Early life and career ==
Wyatt was born in Oxford and educated at SS. Philip and James primary school and Magdalen College School, Oxford, before winning a scholarship to study at the University of Cambridge where he was an undergraduate at Emmanuel College, Cambridge.

== Career ==
Wyatt began work as a trainee journalist on the Sheffield Telegraph and joined BBC Radio News as a sub-editor in 1965 before moving to BBC Television, working for the Presentation Department as producer of Points of View, The Fifties and Storyteller, before joining the daily arts and media programme Late Night Line-Up.

Wyatt originated and edited Edition, presented by Kenneth Allsop, The Book Programme with Robert Robinson and Don't Quote Me. He produced a number of documentaries including All the Buildings Fit to Print about Nikolaus Pevsner and was executive producer of They've Shot Kennedy, Good Night and Good Luck and The Scars of Autumn. He produced the documentary B. Traven: A Mystery Solved and wrote a real-life literary detective story The Man Who Was B. Traven (Cape, 1980), discovering new evidence about the life of the mysterious writer B. Traven, author of The Treasure of the Sierra Madre.

By 1978 he was Assistant Head of the Presentation Department, whose output included The Old Grey Whistle Test, The Hollywood Greats and Barry Norman's Film... programme. From 1981 to 1988 he was Head of Documentary Features, starting 40 Minutes, Crimewatch, Food and Drink, Comrades, All Our Working Lives, The Duty Men, Queens' – A Cambridge College, and Michael Palin: Around the World in 80 Days, and negotiating and executive producing the documentary Elizabeth R: A Year in the Life of the Queen, produced by Edward Mirzoeff, the highest rating documentary ever shown by the BBC.

In 1991 he became managing director of BBC Network Television, after a spell as Assistant managing director. As MD he led a revival in drama – Middlemarch, Pride and Prejudice, Between the Lines, The Buddha of Suburbia, Our Friends in the North, Ballykissangel, This Life, Hamish Macbeth and Dalziel and Pascoe – and a strong programme performance in other genres – in comedy, Goodnight Sweetheart, The Wrong Trousers, Absolutely Fabulous, Men Behaving Badly, Knowing Me Knowing You with Alan Partridge, The Fast Show and The Vicar of Dibley; and in documentary series People's Century, The Death of Yugoslavia and The Nazis: A Warning from History. After five years he was made Chief Executive of BBC Broadcast, responsible for all BBC radio networks and television channels in the UK. During this time he oversaw the launch of BBC Online, the BBC's digital television channels and the creation of the BBC's partnership in UKTV and BBC America. He was also deputy to the Director-General John Birt.

=== Post-BBC career ===
Wyatt retired from the BBC at the end of 1999, becoming chairman of the London Institute, comprising Central Saint Martins College of Arts and Design, Camberwell College of Art, Chelsea College of Arts, London College of Fashion and London College of Printing (now Communication), leading it to become the University of the Arts London. He was appointed a Commander of the Order of the British Empire (CBE) in the 2000 Birthday Honours and served as President of the Royal Television Society from 2000 to 2004. From 2002–7 he served as Chairman of Human Capital Limited, a media strategy and research consultancy. His second book, The Fun Factory – A Life in the BBC, was published by Aurum Press in 2003. The documentary film Toni and Rosi, which he produced and directed with Todd Murray, was transmitted on BBC4 in January 2012.

In 2007 he produced the Wyatt Report, an investigation into clips from Monarchy: The Royal Family at Work being shown to journalists which apparently showed the Queen storming out of a session with American photographer Annie Leibovitz. The BBC subsequently admitted that the scenes used in the trailer had been edited out of sequence, leading to the resignation of RDF's Chief Creative Officer Stephen Lambert, BBC One Controller Peter Fincham and Fincham's Head of Publicity, Jane Fletcher, following the report's publication on 5 October.

=== Directorships ===
Wyatt served a director of Coral Eurobet from 2001–3 and also served on the British Horseracing Board's commission into the conditions of stable and stud staff. He served on the board of Racecourse Media Group from its start in 2004 and chaired it from 2007 to 2012, the company owned by thirty racecourses, which operates the Racing UK television channel and manages their interest in the Turf TV service to betting shops. Wyatt served as a director of Vitec Group plc from 2002 to 2011. He served as a school governor of Magdalen College School, Oxford from 1999 to 2007. He served as chairman of the Teaching Awards Trust from 2008 to 2013 and a trustee of the Services Sound and Vision Corporation 2008–13. From 2013 to 2019 he served as a member of the board of the Welsh National Opera.

=== Publications ===
In 2018 his memoir Oxford Boy – A Post-War Townie Childhood was published, of which Miriam Margolyes wrote, "The book is a TRIUMPH, clever in presenting a lost era, showing how class & rage & cunning made people as we are." Michael Palin said it was "a very enjoyable read".

- B.Traven: A Mystery Solved
- Masters of the Wired World
- The Fun Factory: A Life in the BBC
- Oxford Boy: A Post-War Townie Childhood
- Television Beyond the Millennium
- Facing the Public

== Personal life ==
Wyatt married Jane Bridgit Bagenal in April 1966. They have two daughters and one granddaughter. His entry in Who's Who lists his recreations as fell walking, horse racing, opera, theatre and membership of the Garrick Club.

Cultural offices
Preceded by Jeremy Isaacs	President of the Royal Television Society; 2000 – 2004	Succeeded by Bob Phillis
