= The Virgin Queen =

The Virgin Queen may refer to:

- Elizabeth I (1533–1603), Queen of England who never married
- The Virgin Queen (play), 1728 British tragedy by Richard Barford
- The Virgin Queen (1923 film), British silent historical drama about Elizabeth I
- The Virgin Queen (1928 film), American silent short about Elizabeth I, filmed in Technicolor
- The Virgin Queen (1955 film), American historical drama about Elizabeth I, starring Bette Davis
- The Virgin Queen (TV serial), 2005 BBC four-part miniseries about Elizabeth I

== See also ==
- Christina, Queen of Sweden (1626–1689) who never married
- The Virgin Queen of St. Francis High, 1987 Canadian teen comedy film
- Virgin queen bee that has not mated
