= Meredith Corporation =

American media company (1902–2021)

- Final logo used from 2009 to 2021
- Type: Public
- Traded as: NYSE: MDP
- Industry: Media
- Founded: 1902; 124 years ago
- Founder: Edwin T. Meredith
- Defunct: December 1, 2021; 4 years ago
- Fate: Acquired by IAC and merged with Dotdash to form Dotdash Meredith; Broadcast assets acquired by Gray Television
- Successors: People Inc.; Gray Media
- Headquarters: Des Moines, Iowa, U.S.
- Key people: Steve Lacy; (executive chairman); Tom Harty; (president and CEO)
- Products: Newspapers; magazines; television stations; educational services; websites
- Revenue: ▼$810.5 million (FY December 2019)
- Net income: ▼$37.8 million (FY December 2019)
- Total assets: ▲$6.727 billion (FY 2018)
- Total equity: ▲$1.097 billion (FY 2018)
- Number of employees: 7,915 (2018)

Meredith Corporation's logo used from 1979 to 2009

Meredith Corporation was an American media conglomerate based in Des Moines, Iowa, that owned newspapers, magazines, television stations, and websites. Its publications had a readership of more than 120 million and paid circulation of more than 40 million, its websites had nearly 135 million monthly unique visitors and its broadcast television stations reached 11% of U.S. households. Since 2021, Meredith was absorbed into the new conglomerate, Dotdash Meredith, underneath the holding company IAC Inc.

== History ==
=== Early years ===
Edwin Thomas Meredith founded the company in 1902 when he began publishing Successful Farming magazine.

In 1922, Meredith began publishing Fruit, Garden and Home magazine, a home and family service publication. In 1924, the magazine was retitled Better Homes and Gardens, and the first issue cost a dime on the newsstand. In 1930, the company published the first edition of The Better Homes and Gardens Cook Book. In 1946, the company became a public company.

In 1970, the company attempted to enter the entertainment industry by purchasing game show and film producer Ralph Andrews Productions. Two years later, it became MC Productions, and Ralph Andrews bought back rights to the game shows later that year, which resulted in a subsequent lawsuit in the late 1970s. In 1973, Meredith teamed up with Avco Broadcasting to produce a series of nine prime-time television specials, which Avco Program Sales is syndicating, aimed for youth children.

In 1987, Meredith Corporation made a deal that they would purchase MMT Sales for $40 million, and would represent national advertising spot time on 60 stations across the entire US country.

In 1994, Meredith and CBS struck an agreement to renew its Kansas City station and affiliate two of the Bay City and Phoenix stations with the network.

=== 2012–2021: Merger with Time Inc.; Gray/Dotdash sale ===
In March 2012, Meredith acquired allrecipes.com from Reader's Digest Association for $175 million.

In February 2013, Meredith discussed buying an interest in Time Inc. from Time Warner. Instead, Time Warner sold Time Inc. as a separate company.

In October 2014, Meredith announced a 10-year licensing agreement with Martha Stewart Living Omnimedia of the rights to Martha Stewart Living and Martha Stewart Weddings magazines and to the marthastewart.com website.

In November 2014, Meredith acquired mywedding.com.

In January 2015, the company acquired Selectable Media. Also in January 2015, Meredith acquired Shape, Natural Health, and Fit Pregnancy magazines from American Media Inc. Meredith's Fitness magazine was folded into Shape, while both magazines' websites continued to operate separately.

On September 8, 2015, Media General announced its intent to acquire Meredith in a cash and stock deal valued at $2.4 billion. Pending regulatory and shareholder approval, the deal was expected to be consummated in June 2016. The combined company would have operated under the name Meredith Media General, and be the third-largest owner of television stations in the United States—serving an estimated 30% of households. To comply with FCC ownership limits, the company would have divested and/or swapped stations in six markets. Media General shareholders would have controlled 65% of the company, with Meredith shareholders holding 35%. However, the offer was countered by Nexstar Broadcasting Group, who made a successful, $4.6 billion bid to acquire Media General instead.

In February 2017, it was reported that Meredith and a group of investors led by Edgar Bronfman Jr. were considering another possible purchase of Time Inc. On November 26, 2017, it was announced that Meredith Corporation would acquire Time Inc. in a $2.8 billion deal. $640 million in backing was provided by Koch Equity Development, but the Koch family would not have a board seat or otherwise influence the company's operations.

On January 9, 2018, it was announced that Meredith would launch a Hungry Girl magazine on January 16, expanding from the online brand.

On January 31, 2018, the company completed the acquisition of Time Inc. In March 2018, only six weeks after the closure of the deal, Meredith announced that it would lay off 200 employees, up to 1,000 more over the next 10 months, and explore the sale of Fortune, Money, Sports Illustrated, and Time. Meredith felt that, despite their "strong consumer reach", these brands did not align with its core lifestyle properties. Howard Milstein had announced on February 7, 2018, that he would acquire Golf Magazine from Meredith, and Time Inc. UK was sold to the British private equity group Epiris (later rebranded to TI Media) in late February. In September 2018, Meredith announced the sale of Time to Marc Benioff and his wife Lynne for $190 million. In November 2018, Meredith announced the sale of Fortune to Thai businessman Chatchaval Jiaravanon, whose family owns Charoen Pokphand, for $150 million. After failing to find a buyer for Money, Meredith in April 2019 announced that it would cease the magazine's print publication as of July 2019, but would invest in the brand's digital component Money.com. In May 2019, Meredith announced the sale of Sports Illustrated to Authentic Brands Group, for $110 million.

Time Inc. Productions was renamed Four M Studios in May 2018. The studio is under Bruce Gersh, Meredith's president of People, Entertainment Weekly, and People en Español and head of Four M Studios.

In October 2019, Meredith Corporation sold the Money brand and website to Ad Practitioners LLC, a media and advertising company based in Puerto Rico. Terms were not disclosed, but sources said the brand went for just over $20 million, that was more than the $10 million Meredith was seeking in early 2019.

In November 2019 the company unloaded one more asset acquired in the Time Inc. acquisition, its 60% equity ownership of digital advertising company Viant Technology Holding Inc. that, among other assets, owns social networking site Myspace. Also in November 2019, the company announced the launch of a new quarterly magazine, called Reveal, in January 2020 in collaboration with Drew and Jonathan Scott from HGTV's Property Brothers.

On May 3, 2021, Meredith announced an agreement with Gray Television for the latter to acquire Meredith's television division. The transaction will be structured as a spin-off of a new (short-lived) Meredith Corporation, containing the magazines division, to existing shareholders, to be immediately followed by the old Meredith (by then consisting solely of its TV stations group) being acquired by Gray for $2.7 billion in cash.

Later that year, on October 6, Meredith announced an agreement whereby the company's remaining magazine and other non-broadcast assets would be acquired by IAC's Dotdash for $2.7 billion, forming a new entity called Dotdash Meredith.

On November 15, Meredith announced it received regulatory approvals for both the Gray and IAC transactions. Both deals were completed on December 1. On February 9, 2022, it was revealed that six former Meredith Corporation magazines (Entertainment Weekly, InStyle, EatingWell, Health, Parents and People en Espanol) will cease having print circulation and switch to a digital-only format.

== Divisions ==
=== National media ===
==== Magazines ====
Meredith magazines include the following brands:

- 25 Beautiful Homes
- Ageless Iron
- Allrecipes Magazine
- American Baby
- American Patchwork & Quilting
- Better Homes and Gardens
- Country Life
- Diabetic Living
- Do-It-Yourself
- Eat This, Not That
- EatingWell
- Entertainment Weekly (from Time Inc.)
- Every Day with Rachael Ray
- FamilyFun
- Fitness
- Food & Wine
- Health
- InStyle (from Time Inc.)
- Living the Country Life
- Midwest Living
- Parents (and Ser Padres)
- People (from Time Inc.)
- Practical Boat Owner
- Real Simple (from Time Inc.)
- Shape
- Siempre Mujer
- Southern Living
- Successful Farming
- Travel + Leisure (from Time Inc.)
- Wood

Defunct magazines include

- Family Circle
- Ladies' Home Journal
- Money (from Time Inc.)
- More
- Readymade
- Scrapbooks Etc.
- Traditional Home

==== Digital media ====
- Allrecipes.com
- mywedding.com

=== Local media ===
The broadcasting division owned 15 television stations. Most of the company's stations were affiliated with CBS or Fox. Meredith's broadcasting division also produced Better from 2007 until 2015, which was originally conceived as a brand extension of BH&G. Since its inception in 2007 the show has placed an increasing emphasis on celebrity interviews and music performances. There were also cooking demonstrations and regular features on health, beauty, fitness and fashion. Local versions of the concept continue to air on Meredith stations.

On December 23, 2013, Meredith announced plans to buy St. Louis CBS affiliate KMOV and Phoenix independent station KTVK for $407.5 million in cash from Gannett Company and Sander Media, LLC to satisfy a federal mandate that Gannett sell KMOV. The purchase of KMOV was completed on February 28, 2014, while the KTVK sale was completed on June 19.

Meredith also struck deals to acquire ABC affiliate WGGB in Springfield, Massachusetts from Gormally Broadcasting for $53.8 million and Fox affiliate WALA in Mobile, Alabama from LIN Media for $86 million.

The Local Media Division was sold to Gray Television on December 1, 2021.

== Final stations ==
- Stations are arranged in alphabetical order by state and city of license.
- Two boldface asterisks appearing following a station's call letters (**) indicate a station built and signed on by Meredith.

Stations owned by the Meredith Corporation
Media market	State	Station	Purchased	Sold	Notes
Mobile	Alabama	WALA-TV	2014	2021	
Phoenix	Arizona	KASW	2014	2014	
Phoenix	Arizona	KPHO	1952	1972	
Phoenix	Arizona	KPHO-TV	1952	2021	
Phoenix	Arizona	KTVK	2014	2021	
Fresno	California	KSEE	1984	1993	
Hartford–New Haven	Connecticut	WFSB	1997	2021	
Orlando	Florida	WCPX-TV	1997	1997	(Note: Acquired from First Media, then traded to Post-Newsweek Stations for WFSB.)
Orlando	Florida	WOFL	1983	2002	
Ocala–Gainesville	Florida	WOGX	1996	2002	(Note: Semi-satellite of WOFL.)
Atlanta	Georgia	WGCL-TV	1999	2021	(Note: Known as WGNX prior to 2000.)
Atlanta	Georgia	WPCH-TV	2017	2021	(Note: Owned by Turner Broadcasting System and operated by Meredith from 2011 to 2017.)
Springfield	Massachusetts	WGGB-TV	2014	2021	
Springfield	Massachusetts	WSHM-LD	2004	2021	(Note: Semi-satellite of WFSB.)
Bay City–Flint–Saginaw	Michigan	WNEM	2004	2013	
Bay City–Flint–Saginaw	Michigan	WNEM-TV	1969	2021	
Kansas City	Missouri	KCMO	1953	1983	
Kansas City	Missouri	KCMO-FM	1953	1983	
Kansas City	Missouri	KCTV	1953	2021	(Note: Known as KCMO-TV from 1953 to 1983.)
Kansas City	Missouri	KSMO-TV	2005	2021	
St. Louis	Missouri	KMOV	2014	2021	
Omaha	Nebraska	WOW	1951	1983	
Omaha	Nebraska	WOW-FM	1951	1983	
Omaha	Nebraska	WOW-TV	1951	1975	
Las Vegas	Nevada	KVVU-TV	1985	2021	
Syracuse	New York	WHEN	1954	1976	
Syracuse	New York	WTVH **	1948	1993	(Note: Known as WHEN-TV from 1948 until 1976.)
Portland	Oregon	KPDX	1997	2021	
Portland	Oregon	KPTV	2002	2021	
Bend	Oregon	KFXO-LD	1997	2007	
Bend	Oregon	KUBN-LD	2006	2021	(Note: Semi-satellite of KPDX.)
Pittsburgh	Pennsylvania	WPGH-TV	1978	1986	
Greenville	South Carolina	WHNS	1997	2021	
Chattanooga	Tennessee	WFLI-TV	2004	2008	
Nashville	Tennessee	WSMV-TV	1995	2021	
Seattle–Tacoma	Washington	KCPQ	1998	1999	(Note: Acquired solely to be traded to Tribune Broadcasting for WGNX.)

== Four M Studios ==
Four M Studios (Four M), formerly Time Inc. Productions, is Meredith's in-house production company and is under the oversight of Bruce Gersh, Meredith's president of People, Entertainment Weekly and People en Español.

After attempting a few TV shows in 2014 and 2015, the company formed Time Inc. Productions in 2016 as its in-house production company. It launched its free, ad-supported online video service PeopleTV in 2016, which got a pay TV deal by May 2018 with FuboTV. In November 2017, it launched its first over-the-top subscription service, Sports Illustrated TV, available via Amazon Channels. On October 30, 2017, it announced that Paramount Network was partnering with it on two TV pilots.

Time Inc. Productions was renamed Four M Studios in May 2018. Four M would expand from the Time titles to all Meredith titles and to freestanding lifestyle shows and scripted shows. Four M also announced at that time a deal with Freeform TV channel to develop Meredith magazine stories, including People's "Heroes Among Us" franchise, into telefilms.

Four M Studios partnered with Imagine Entertainment's Imagine Kids & Family division. Its first project from the partnership is LIFE for Kids, a children's TV show using LIFE Magazine's photo archive.

=== Production library ===
Time Inc. Productions

- People Magazine Investigates (Investigation Discovery)
- The Mars Generation (Netflix)
- The Making of SI Swimsuit 2017 (DirecTV Now)
- Puppy Bowl: Where Are They Now (Animal Planet)
- The Story of Diana (ABC) 2017 documentary miniseries, 2 nights 2 hours each
- A Year in Space (PBS) Emmy-winning
- Cultureshock (A&E) pop culture docuseries from Entertainment Weekly
- 89 Blocks (Fox) East St. Louis high school football team documentary from Sports Illustrated, which was nominated for a Sports Emmy Award

Time Inc. Productions/Four M Studios

- Sports Illustrated: True Crime pilot working title (Paramount Network) Jerry Bruckheimer TV
- Entertainment Weekly: The Bullseye pilot (Paramount Network) Conveyor Media

Four M Studios

- Home (Apple) 10 one-hour episodes
- People Magazine Investigates: Cults (Investigation Discovery)
- People Magazine Investigates: Crimes of Fashion (Investigation Discovery)
- The Story of the Royals (ABC) documentary miniseries

== See also ==
- New Media Strategies
- List of United States magazines
