= Charles R: The Making of a Monarch =

British television programme

- Genre: Documentary film
- Narrated by: Charles III
- Country of origin: United Kingdom
- Original language: English

Production
- Running time: 60 minutes
- Production company: BBC Studios

Original release
- Network: BBC One
- Release: 30 April 2023

Charles R: The Making of a Monarch is a 2023 television documentary film of home movies shot by the British royal family of Charles III throughout the seven decades of his life. The film aired on BBC One and BBC iPlayer on 30 April 2023 ahead of Charles's coronation. The programme is narrated by Charles himself, who elaborates on events from his childhood, military service, family life, and public life. The film contains unseen personal moments as well as footage from the 1969 documentary Royal Family, including unseen footage from the out-takes.

The documentary also features an interview with his wife Queen Camilla and explores Charles's relationship with his elder son and heir William, Prince of Wales. Also shown in the film are his parents Queen Elizabeth II and Prince Philip, his grandparents King George VI and Queen Elizabeth The Queen Mother, and his grandchildren Prince George and Princess Charlotte of Wales.

== Reception ==
The Times, in its own four-star review, said the documentary "struck a nice balance between reverential historical document and chatty home movie", and Charles emerged as "modest, shy, anxious to please".
