= Readymade (disambiguation) =

A readymade, or found object, is a piece of art created from undisguised, but often modified, objects or products that are not normally considered art.

Readymade may also refer to:

- Prefabrication, the practice of assembling components in a factory and transporting complete assemblies to a construction site
- "Readymade", a 1996 alternative rock song by Beck from his album Odelay
- "Readymade" (song), a 2006 rock song by the Red Hot Chili Peppers
- ReadyMade (magazine), an American hobby magazine

== See also ==
- Readymades of Marcel Duchamp, a variety of ordinary manufactured objects presented by Marcel Duchamp as works of art
