= Steve Lacy (businessman) =

American media executive

- Born: March 20, 1954 (age 72); Shawnee Mission, Kansas, U.S.
- Education: Kansas State University (B.S., MBA)
- Spouse: Cathy Lacy

Stephen M. Lacy is an American retired magazine and media company executive. He served Executive Chairman of Meredith Corporation, a publicly traded publishing, broadcasting and interactive media firm based in Des Moines, Iowa from 2009 to 2019. He took over as CEO of Meredith from retiring president Bill Kerr on July 1, 2006, and has continued expanding Meredith's interactive division, overseeing the acquisition of four online media agencies, including Los Angeles–based design firm O'Grady Meyers and Washington, D.C.–based New Media Strategies.

Under Lacy's leadership, ad revenues for Better Homes and Gardens increased by nearly $100 million since 2002, described by the industry as "amazing for a 'mature' magazine." Lacy also drew praise for his December 2002 acquisition of the American Baby Group from Primedia (now Rent Group), opening up Meredith's access to moms, a magazine demographic key to Meredith's "family friendly" image. In 2003, Advertising Age selected Lacy as its Publishing Executive of the Year at its annual conference.

On January 15, Meredith announced via PR Newswire that Lacy would retire effective March 20, 2019, his 65th birthday.

== Boards and chairmanships ==
Lacy is current chairman of the Direct Marketing Association and the Greater Des Moines Partnership. He also serves on the boards of the Magazine Publishers of America, the Advertising Council, Kansas State University Foundation, and on the Iowa chapters of the United Way, American Red Cross and Big Brothers Big Sisters. Lacy is also the president of the house corporation of the Sigma Alpha Epsilon Kansas Beta chapter, his college fraternity.

== Personal life ==
Lacy was born in Shawnee Mission, Kansas in 1954. He attended Kansas State University, earning a Bachelor's degree in Accounting in 1976. Lacy then earned his MBA from Kansas State in 1977.
