= Peter Fincham =

British television producer (b. 1956)

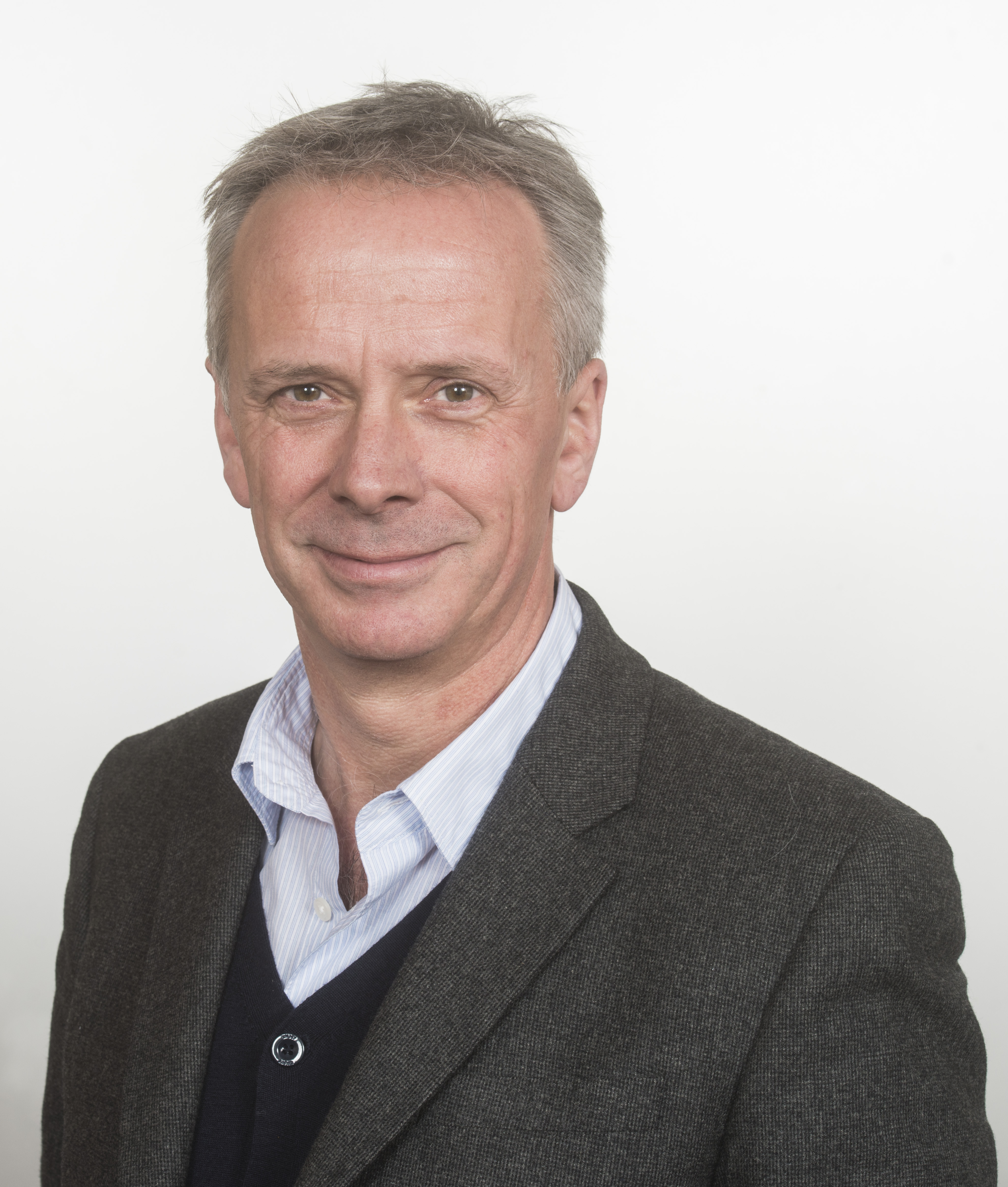
- Fincham in 2014
- Born: Peter Arthur Fincham; 26 July 1956 (age 70)
- Education: Tonbridge School; Churchill College, Cambridge
- Employer(s): TalkBack Productions; BBC; ITV
- Title: Controller of BBC One (2005–2007); Director of Television for ITV (2008–2016)

Peter Arthur Fincham (born 26 July 1956) is a British television producer and executive. From 2008 until 2016, he was the director of television for the ITV network. He was also formerly the controller of BBC One, the primary television channel of the British Broadcasting Corporation, until his resignation on 5 October 2007, following criticism over the handling of the Monarchy: The Royal Family at Work debacle.

== Early life ==
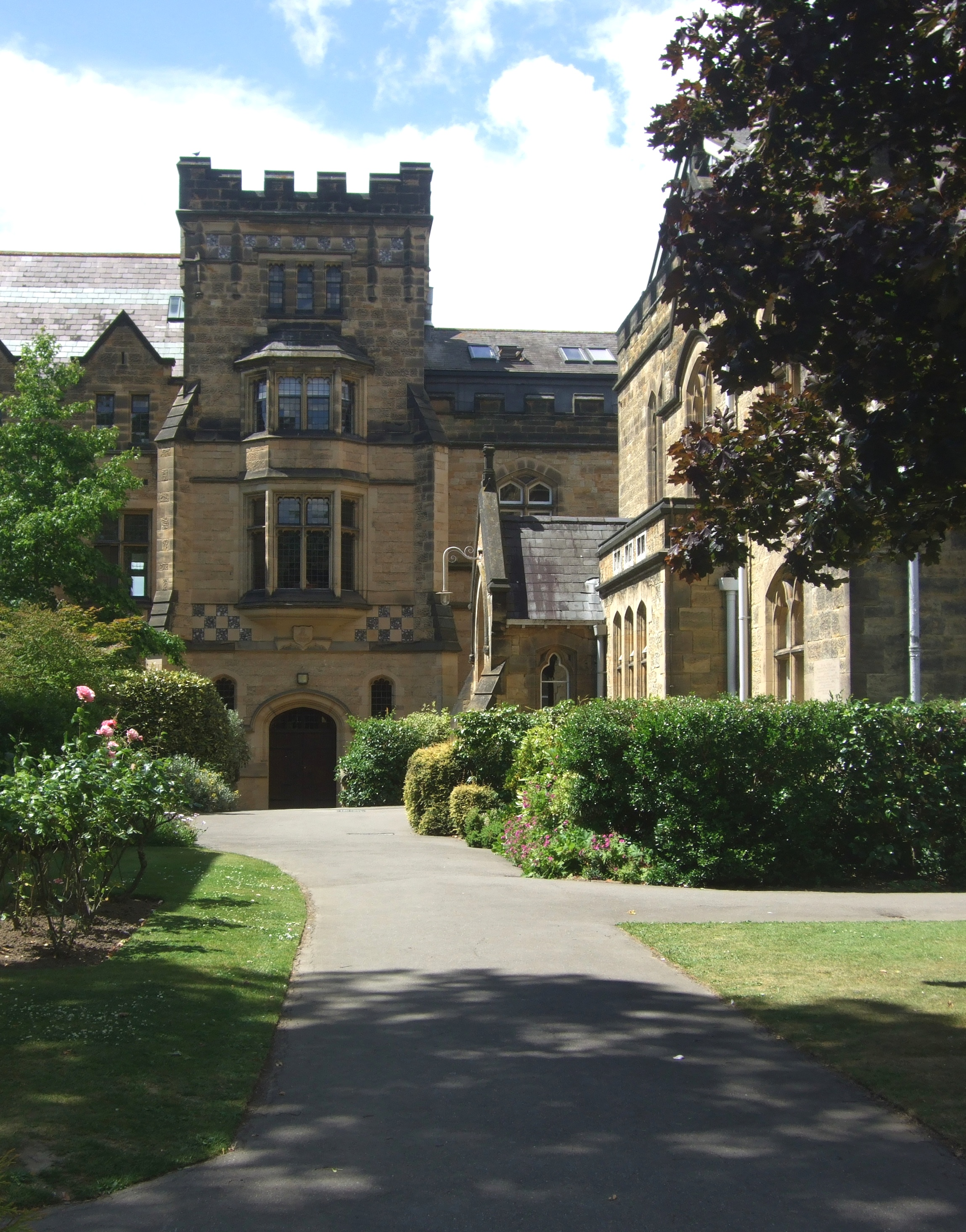
Tonbridge School

Fincham was educated at the independent Tonbridge School, and then studied at Churchill College, Cambridge. He joined the Cambridge Footlights production team as musical director, alongside a committee which included Griff Rhys Jones, Jimmy Mulville, Rory McGrath and Clive Anderson. After leaving Footlights, Fincham composed songs, none of which were picked up for recording, and then worked on the touring version of Godspell. During a period of increasingly common unemployment, Fincham was walking on Wandsworth Common in the rain and thinking to himself: "Oh my God. What have I done? I have made the wrong decision?" Fincham applied for a job at the BBC in 1984, a position as a researcher on The Late, Late Breakfast Show after his friend Helen Fielding left to concentrate on her writing career. However, he was unsuccessful in this application.

== Career ==
=== TalkBack (1985–2005) ===
In 1985 he joined the staff of the independent production company TalkBack Productions as a producer. At the time the company, which was founded by comedians Mel Smith and Griff Rhys Jones, produced radio programming, television advertisements and corporate videos. Fincham became the company's managing director in 1986, and in 1989 oversaw the move of TalkBack into fully-fledged television production when it produced its founders' sketch show Smith and Jones for BBC One.

TalkBack became particularly well known for its comedy output, which included such shows as The Day Today (BBC Two, 1994), Knowing Me Knowing You with Alan Partridge (BBC Two, 1994), They Think It’s All Over (BBC One, 1995–2006), Never Mind the Buzzcocks (BBC Two, 1996–2015), I'm Alan Partridge (BBC Two, 1997 and 2002), Smack the Pony (Channel 4, 1999–2003) and Da Ali G Show (Channel 4, 2000). Fincham was an executive producer on many of these programmes. He also helped to establish TalkBack as a noted producer in other genres, with the company moving into drama with Stephen Poliakoff's Shooting the Past (BBC Two) in 1999.

In 2001, Fincham was given an Indie Award for outstanding contribution to the independent production sector. Also that year, TalkBack was sold to FremantleMedia in a £62 million deal, which made Fincham personally a multi-millionaire. Fremantle merged TalkBack with another of its acquisitions, Thames Television, to form the new Talkback Thames production company, of which Fincham became the chief executive in February 2003. He remained in this position until he left at the beginning of 2005, after 20 years at TalkBack and its successor company, claiming he wanted "a new challenge and a new adventure". BBC One controller Lorraine Heggessey's appointment to his old post opened up the vacancy at BBC One, which he in turn applied for and won despite being "rich enough never to have to work again".

=== BBC One (2005–2007) ===
Fincham was regarded in some quarters as a surprising choice as controller, as prior to his appointment he had never worked for either the BBC or any other broadcaster, having spent his career in the independent production sector. In 2006, The Guardian newspaper reported that he was ultimately responsible for an annual programming budget at BBC One of £873 million.

Fincham oversaw the commissioning of successful BBC One programmes such as Jane Eyre, How Do You Solve a Problem Like Maria? (both 2006) and Robin Hood (2006–09). His first full year in charge saw a year-on-year growth in the channel's audience share, with BBC One earning a 23.6% share in August 2006, compared to 22.2% in the same month in 2005.

Fincham directly initiated the creation of both the early evening current affairs and lifestyle programme The One Show (2006–present) and the prime time chat show Davina (2006), the latter designed as a vehicle for presenter Davina McCall. However, Davina was a critical and ratings disaster, which Fincham subsequently admitted was personally his fault, although he defended the strategy of experimenting with the BBC One schedule. He made another notable change to the schedule in January 2007, when he moved the current affairs series Panorama back from Sunday nights to the prime time Monday evening slot it had been removed from in 2000, although this decision was at least partly in response to a demand from the board of governors of the BBC for the channel to show more current affairs programming in prime time.

It was also Fincham's decision to scrap the BBC One "Rhythm and Movement" idents, which had been used to provide the channel with its on-screen identity between programmes since they were introduced by Heggessey in 2002. They were replaced by a new set of idents, known as the "Circle idents", in the autumn of 2006; however, Fincham again found himself criticised, this time by The Daily Telegraph newspaper, for the decision to spend £1.2 million on the set of eight ten-second films, some of which were shot in Mexico and Croatia. Fincham also found himself having to publicly defend the £18 million salary the BBC awarded presenter Jonathan Ross in 2006, although Ross's BBC One work – which primarily consisted of Friday Night with Jonathan Ross, Film... and various one-off events – formed only part of his BBC commitment, which also encompassed programmes for BBC Three and BBC Radio 2.

On 18 May 2007, Fincham decided to drop the Australian soap opera Neighbours from BBC One after 21 years on the channel, when its producers increased the price they wanted the BBC to pay for it in a bidding war. Fincham commented that: "We'd love to have kept it but not at any price."

Fincham was involved in a further controversy in July 2007, when introducing a press conference to publicise BBC One's forthcoming autumn season programming for later in the year. The season launch tape shown to journalists included a trailer from the documentary Monarchy: The Royal Family at Work. It showed the Queen apparently storming out of a session with American photographer Annie Leibovitz over a disagreement about what she should wear, but the BBC subsequently admitted that one of the shots used in the trailer had been edited out of order. Fincham admitted the error, and initially rejected calls that he should resign from his position as a result. However, the publication of the Wyatt Report on 5 October led to his resignation.

=== ITV (2008–2016) ===
On 28 February 2008 it was announced that the ITV network, the BBC's main rival, had hired Fincham to be its new director of television. At the Edinburgh Television Festival in August 2008, Fincham claimed that broadcasters such as ITV were under too much pressure from industry regulator Ofcom to produce programmes that were only of a minority interest, as opposed to pure entertainment programmes for a mainstream audience. In 2010 he decided to axe the long-running drama series The Bill; ATV News Network reported 97% of the public were against the drama being dropped.. In December 2011, he took the unilateral decision to remove a song from The Jonathan Ross Show that was commissioned especially for the programme by the comedian and songwriter Tim Minchin. The song, titled "Woody Allen Jesus", had already been approved by Ross's producer and ITV's legal compliance officers. Minchin, disappointed at the decision, later made the footage available on his own site where he also criticised Fincham's decision.

In January 2016, ITV announced that Fincham had decided to step down as director of television and leave the company.

=== Expectation (2016–) ===
After leaving ITV, Fincham launched the independent production company Expectation with co-CEO Tim Hincks, the former president of Endemol Shine Group, producing such shows as Clarkson's Farm and Alma's Not Normal.

Since 2020, Fincham and Jon Plowman have presented four series of What’s Funny About… on BBC Radio 4 Extra. In April 2025, Fincham and Jimmy Mulville started a podcast about the TV industry.

== Personal life ==
Fincham's wife, Clare, runs a charity, Second Space, which provides respite care for the ill and disabled and their carers. Fincham's family live in London. In music, he enjoys Bob Dylan and Neil Young.

Outside of broadcasting, Fincham co-edited The Utterly Utterly Merry Comic Relief Christmas Book with author Douglas Adams in 1986.

Media offices
Preceded by Lorraine Heggessey	Controller of BBC One; 2005–2007	Succeeded by Jay Hunt
