= ReadyMade (magazine) =

- Editor: Kitty Morgan
- Categories: Do it yourself (DIY)
- Frequency: Bimonthly
- Founded: 2001
- Final issue: 2011
- Company: Meredith Corporation
- Country: United States
- Based in: Des Moines, Iowa
- Language: English
- Website: ReadyMade
- ISSN: 1544-2950

ReadyMade (or Ready Made) was a California, United States, bimonthly magazine which focused on do-it-yourself (DIY) projects involving interior design, making furniture, home improvement, sewing, metalworking, woodworking and other disciplines. It also focused on sustainable design, independent music and DIY culture. The magazine was marketed to people who enjoy creating unique items to have at home and wear and featured projects which could often be completed with everyday materials, such as household items.

== History ==
ReadyMade was founded by chief editor Shoshana Berger and publisher Grace Hawthorne in Berkeley, California. The inaugural issue was published in Winter 2002, with quarterly issues produced until the magazine moved to bimonthly issues with the March/April 2004 publication. In 2006, the Meredith Corporation purchased the magazine. In January 2009, Meredith announced it was relocating the magazine's creative staff to Des Moines, Iowa due to company-wide budgetary concerns (though the ReadyMade title itself was reportedly successful). None of the editorial staff chose to relocate, and Better Homes and Gardens executive editor Kitty Morgan assumed editorial duties for ReadyMade on an interim basis. On June 16, 2011, ReadyMade announced on its blog that Meredith had discontinued the magazine.

== Subjects ==
Unlike more traditional home improvement magazines and how-to books, ReadyMade's projects were aimed at a younger (21–39) audience. Projects in their issues included:

- making a lamp out of a cd spindle
- altering a car stereo to accept an iPod input jack
- instructions on how to run for local office in the United States
- recycling broken speakers to become light fixtures, coffee tables, or bookcases

and similar projects with an emphasis on creating an urban indie aesthetic.

== Demographic ==
ReadyMade was aimed at the emerging DIY culture in North America that enjoys not only the fashion of handmade items and interior design, but also the philosophy and politics inherent in recycling, DIY attire, and ecology. The ads featured in the magazine targeted a largely liberal readership interested in locally produced, handmade, ecological, and organic goods, but also featured ads from companies such as PF Flyers shoes, Urban Outfitters, and similar corporations looking to appeal to a young hipster audience. The music featured in the articles was generally independent rock, featuring such artists' own DIY projects, such as an article where The Flaming Lips showed how to make a mock space station out of junkyard parts.
