= Aileen Manning =

American film actress (1886–1946)

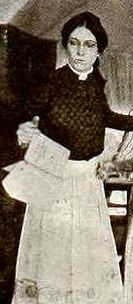
- Manning in Heart of Twenty (1920)
- Born: January 20, 1886
- Died: March 25, 1946 (aged 60); Hollywood, California, U.S.
- Occupation: Actress
- Years active: 1919–1931

Aileen Manning (January 20, 1886 – March 25, 1946) was an American film actress.

Manning was in demand as a character actress in silent films. She was known for her roles in silent and early sound films, including Uncle Tom's Cabin (1927) and Huckleberry Finn (1931).

About her performance in Everybody's Sweetheart (1920), Variety wrote that she "makes the character necessarily disagreeable, but true to life". She played Queen Anne in A Lady of Quality (1924); it was noted that she bore a resemblance to the character she was playing. She played another queen, Elizabeth I, in the MGM short The Virgin Queen (1928).

Manning lived at Hollywood-by-the-Sea. She died on March 25, 1946, in Hollywood.

== Filmography ==
- A Regular Fellow (1919) as Mrs. Horatio Grimm
- The Little Shepherd of Kingdom Come (1920) as Cousin Lucy
- Heart of Twenty (1920) as Aunt Lucy
- Everybody's Sweetheart (1920) as Mrs. Willing
- Her Husband's Friend (1920) as Dr. Henrietta Carter
- Home Stuff (1921) as Mrs. 'Pat'
- Beauty's Worth (1922) as Aunt Cynthia Whitney
- A Tailor-Made Man (1922) as Miss Shayn
- Rags to Riches (1922) as Purist League member
- The Power of Love (1922) as Ysabel Almeda
- Mixed Faces (1922) as Mrs. Molly Crutcher
- Nobody's Money (1923) as Prue Kimball
- Main Street (1923) as Mrs. Stowbody
- Lovers' Lane (1924) as Miss Mealy
- The House of Youth (1924) as Aunt Maggie Endicott
- The Snob (1924) as Lottie
- The Bridge of Sighs (1925) as Mrs. Smithers
- Enticement (1925) as The Old Maid
- Under the Rouge (1925) as Mrs. Fleck
- Thank You (1925) as Hannah
- Stella Maris (1925) as Mary Heaton
- The Boy Friend (1926) (uncredited)
- The Whole Town's Talking (1926) as Mrs. Van Loon
- Uncle Tom's Cabin (1927) as Aunt Ophelia (as Aileen Mannin)
- Man, Woman and Sin (1927)
- The Virgin Queen (1928) (Short) as Queen Elizabeth
- The Olympic Hero (1928) as Physical Instructress
- Heart to Heart (1928) as Aunt Meta
- Home, James (1928) as Mrs. Elliot
- Vacation Waves (1928) (Short) as Eddie's Mother-in-law
- A Single Man (1929) as Mrs. Farley
- Sweetie (1929) as Miss Twill (uncredited)
- Wedding Wings (1929) as Ester Quinn
- The Third Alarm (1930) as Mrs. Craig – Orphanage Matron
- Huckleberry Finn (1931) as Abigail Martin (uncredited)
- Range Law (1931) as Ruth's Attendant
