= The Royal Tour of the Caribbean =

1966 British documentary film

- Title screen
- Produced by: Colonial Office
- Release date: 1966
- Language: English

The Royal Tour of the Caribbean is a 1966 documentary film, produced by the Colonial Office to record the royal visit of Elizabeth II to her independent realms and the Crown Colonies of the Caribbean.

The film recorded pre-independence footage from several of stops of the tour. The tour included visits to Antigua, the Bahamas, Barbados, British Guiana, the Caicos Islands, Dominica, Grand Turk Island, Grenada, Jamaica, Montserrat, Saint Kitts and Nevis, Saint Lucia, Saint Vincent, Tortola, and Trinidad and Tobago. The film was one of a relatively few documentaries shot in the area in the 1960s. It had a contemporary in The Lion of Judah (1966), which covered a state visit of Haile Selassie I to Jamaica.

The Colonial Office's documentaries typically covered population and health issues, and the film stands as an exception to this rule.

== Sources ==
- Aitken, Ian, ed. (2013), "West Indies and the Caribbean", The Conscice Routledge Encyclopedia of the Documentary Film, Routledge, ISBN 978-1136512063
