= Elizabeth R: A Year in the Life of the Queen =

British documentary on Queen Elizabeth

- Title screen
- Genre: Documentary film
- Written by: Antony Jay; Edward Mirzoeff
- Directed by: Edward Mirzoeff
- Narrated by: Ian Holm
- Composer: Rachel Portman
- Country of origin: United Kingdom
- Original language: English

Production
- Producer: Edward Mirzoeff
- Running time: 110 minutes
- Production company: BBC

Original release
- Network: BBC One
- Release: 6 February 1992

Related
- Royal Family (1969); Monarchy: The Royal Family at Work (2007)

Elizabeth R is a 1992 television documentary film about Queen Elizabeth II. It was produced by the BBC and directed by Edward Mirzoeff. It was the first officially approved documentary about the British monarchy since Royal Family (1969) and Royal Heritage (1977). Elizabeth R was followed by the BBC-RDF documentary Monarchy: The Royal Family at Work in 2007.

== Production ==
The film was made by BBC to mark the Queen's Ruby Jubilee. It was directed and produced by Edward Mirzoeff. Mirzoeff co-wrote the script with Antony Jay, who had also written the script for the Royal Family (1969). The programme was narrated by Ian Holm, and Rachel Portman composed the music.

Filming took place over 18 months. The royal family watched and approved of the documentary before it was broadcast on television. A VHS video was released in 1992.

The script of the programme was later published as a book with the same title.

== Broadcast and synopsis ==
The film aired on 6 February 1992, the 40th anniversary of the Accession Day of the Queen, and it was also broadcast in more than 25 countries around the world. It aired on PBS in the United States on 16 November 1992.

It contains a wide range of royal activities by the Queen from 1990 to 1991 and provides various firsts such as voiceover commentary by the Queen. It shows royal family gatherings, her state visit to the United States, a pony ride with her grandchildren at Balmoral Castle and the preparations for a banquet at Windsor Castle, among other things. It also displays meetings of the Queen with a number of significant political figures, including Francesco Cossiga, Edward Heath, Ronald Reagan and Lech Wałęsa. The Queen is also shown with her mother, Queen Elizabeth the Queen Mother, at the Epsom Derby.

== Reception ==
The film received mostly positive reviews, including those from the Queen herself. The Queen organised a party for the crew at Buckingham Palace after watching the film before its public broadcast. It gained the largest audience for a documentary in the history of British television and was watched by more than half of the British population in 1992. The film won an award. Robert Hardman of The Spectator argued that Antony Jay, the script writer, redefined the function of the British monarch through this documentary. However, Jeff Silverman of Variety said that the film did not refer to any familial troubles and added "God save the queen; the BBC couldn't."

Its VHS copy became one of the fastest selling videos in the United Kingdom.
