= Royal Family (film) =

1969 documentary about the British monarchy

- Title screen
- Written by: Antony Jay
- Directed by: Richard Cawston
- Starring: Queen Elizabeth II; Prince Philip; Prince Charles; Princess Anne
- Narrated by: Michael Flanders
- Country of origin: United Kingdom
- Original language: English

Production
- Producer: Richard Cawston
- Running time: 110 mins
- Production companies: BBC, ITV

Original release
- Network: BBC1, BBC2, ITV
- Release: 21 June 1969

Royal Family (also known as The Royal Family) is a British television documentary about the family of Queen Elizabeth II. It originally aired on BBC1 and ITV in June 1969. The film attracted over 38 million viewers in the United Kingdom and was sold around the world and seen by an estimated 350 million people. The Queen later had the documentary banned; it has not been shown on British TV since 1977 and access to view the film was heavily restricted. In early 2021 it was leaked and published on the internet. The film remains available to view on the video-sharing platform YouTube and the digital library website Internet Archive.

== Filming ==
Royal Family was commissioned by Elizabeth II to celebrate the investiture of her eldest son, Charles, as Prince of Wales. It was directed by Richard Cawston, scripted by Antony Jay and narrated by Michael Flanders. The film was jointly produced by the BBC and ITV.

It was the idea of William Heseltine, then the royal Press Secretary, and television producer John Brabourne (son-in-law of Lord Mountbatten), who both believed that showing the family's day-to-day life on TV would help to revive public interest in an institution widely seen in the Swinging Sixties as out of touch and irrelevant.

Cawston was approached in March 1968 and filming began on 8 June at Trooping the Colour. A total of 43 hours of material were shot for the documentary. Editing started in March 1969 while filming came to an end in May. All scenes had to be agreed to by an advisory committee chaired by the Queen's husband, Prince Philip, Duke of Edinburgh. However, Cawston was allowed to shoot everything he wanted, later recounting "I never asked for things which I thought would be in bad taste; therefore, there was never any question of asking for something that would have to be turned down". The Queen saw the film in its entirety one month before the broadcast.

== Content ==
The 110-minute documentary covers a year in the Queen's life. It gives an insight into the private side of the family, as well as the role of the monarchy in the 20th century. A typical day sets the tone, beginning with an official audience, followed by lunch and an afternoon garden party. In the evening, the Queen chooses a dress to wear to the opera.

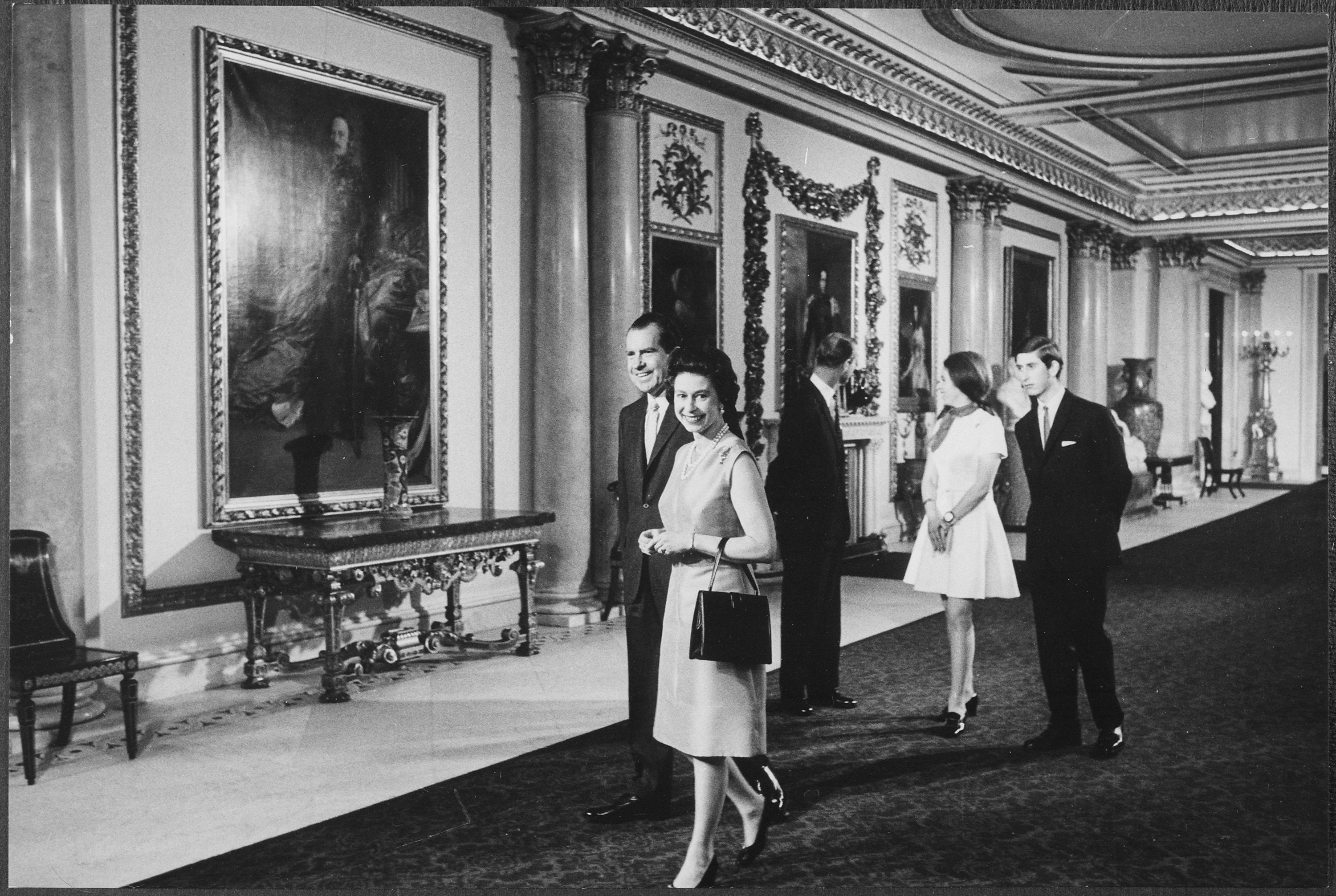
President Nixon with the Royal family at Buckingham Palace, 1969

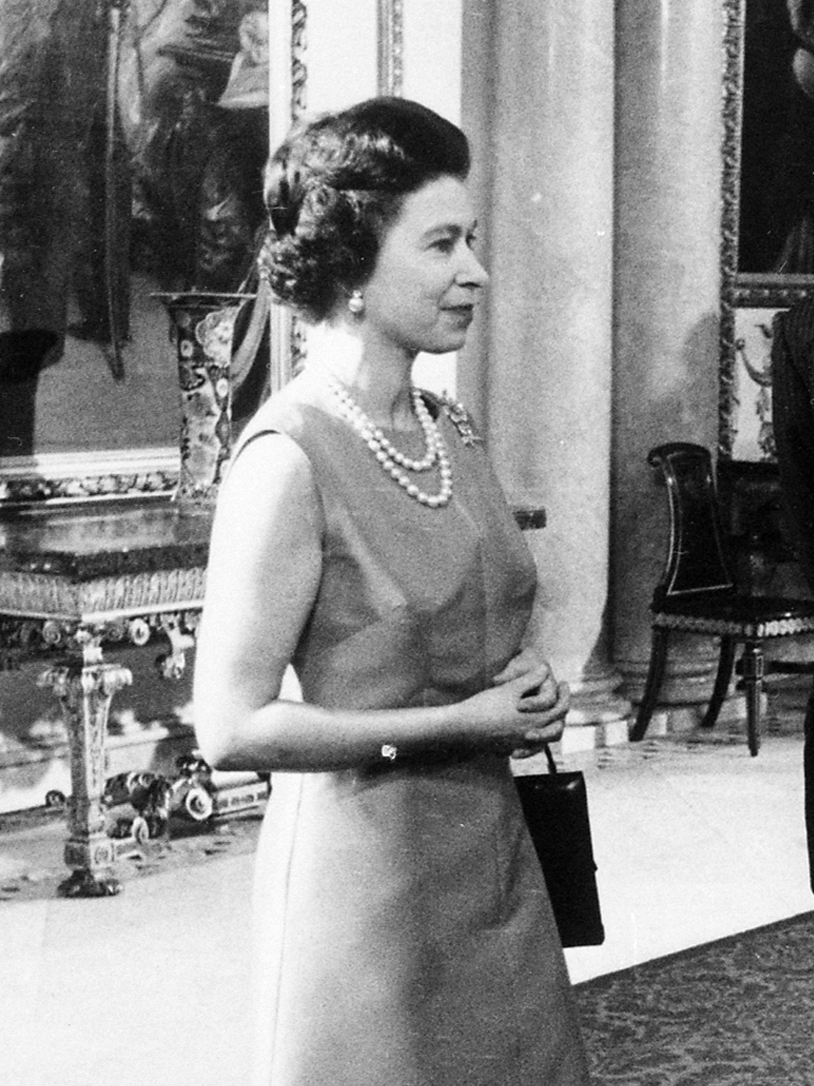
Queen Elizabeth II in 1969

Later in the film she, Prince Philip, and their children enjoy a barbecue at Balmoral Castle, Scotland. In another scene, the Queen buys Prince Edward an ice-cream from a shop. At one point, Charles is practising the cello when a string snaps in his younger brother Edward's face. Members of the family are shown eating breakfast, watching television, water-skiing, playing host to the British Olympic team, and having lunch with Richard Nixon, then President of the United States. The film includes a royal tour of South America and also shows Princess Anne visiting a gas rig in the North Sea.

At the end, the Queen is shown discussing with her family an earlier conversation with the Home Secretary, who had described the then American ambassador, David K. E. Bruce, as a "gorilla", a term Elizabeth said she found "very unkind". However, she recounted her meeting with the guest by saying, "I stood in the middle of the room and pressed the bell, and the doors opened, and there was a gorilla. And I had the most terrible trouble in keeping a straight face — you know, he had a short body and long arms."

== Broadcasts ==
Royal Family was first broadcast on BBC1 on 21 June 1969 and on ITV the following week on 28 or 29 June. The film was later broadcast in Australia on 21 September 1969. It was seen by 30.6 million viewers in the United Kingdom. The commentary had to be altered slightly for American audiences in a version that was broadcast in the US. Owing to the film being seen by three-quarters of the British public at the time, there was no televised Royal Christmas Message in 1969, with a repeat of the film shown simultaneously on BBC1 and BBC2 on Christmas Day instead. Queen Elizabeth II issued a written message to avoid the possibility of over-exposure. The documentary was shown on BBC 2 on 6 February 1972 to mark the 20th anniversary of the Queen's accession to the throne. It was last aired on television on BBC 2 in August 1977 as part of the channel's Festival 77 celebration of the Queen's Silver Jubilee.

The film, protected by Crown copyright, has not been shown since the 1970s as it was deemed to be "of its time and for its time" in later years. According to Heseltine, "we put very heavy restrictions on it because we realised it was a huge shift in attitude". In the 1990s, the film could be viewed privately at the BBC by researchers with permission from Buckingham Palace, for a fee of £35. Broadcasters have been allowed to use short clips in other documentaries; for example, as part of the BBC's The Duke at 90 in 2011, to celebrate Prince Philip's 90th birthday, or during the BBC's coverage of the death of the Queen in 2022.

In 2011 it was announced that clips would be made available for public viewing as part of the Queen's Diamond Jubilee celebrations. It formed part of an exhibition called Queen: Art and Image, which also featured photographs of the monarch from across the years.

In 2021, the film was leaked and published online. It was later taken down from YouTube due to a copyright claim, after the BBC sought to have it removed. It was subsequently reuploaded by several channels, and not removed.

== Reception ==
Royal Family has been accused of revealing too much about the royals. David Attenborough—controller of BBC2 at the time—warned Cawston that his film was in danger of "killing the monarchy". According to a letter Attenborough wrote at the time: "The whole institution depends on mystique and the tribal chief in his hut… If any member of the tribe ever sees inside the hut, then the whole system of the tribal chiefdom is damaged and the tribe eventually disintegrates". The film critic Milton Shulman wrote "every institution that has so far attempted to use TV to popularise or aggrandise itself has been trivialised by it".

A review in The Times concluded that Cawston's film had given the nation "an intimate understanding of what members of the Royal Family are like as individual people without jeopardising their dignity or losing the sense of distance". The journalist Peregrine Worsthorne remarked: "Initially the public will love seeing the Royal Family as not essentially different from anyone else … but in the not-so-long run familiarity will breed, if not contempt, familiarity".

In later years, some blamed the film for a growing lack of deference towards the monarchy. However, William Heseltine had no regrets, calling it "a fantastic success".

In the 2016 Netflix series The Crown, the episode "Bubbikins" features the filming of the documentary, showing the planning, execution, and reactions.

The Telegraph took the opportunity to review the film after it was leaked on the internet: "the Windsors are totally unguarded, natural, non-media trained, it's like watching the original reality TV show … the family don't know how they are expected to behave on camera, so they just behave like themselves".

== See also ==
- Royal Heritage (1977)
- Elizabeth R: A Year in the Life of the Queen (1992)
- Monarchy: The Royal Family at Work (2007)
