= The Story of Diana =

- Genre: Documentary
- Directed by: Rebecca Gitlitz-Rapoport
- Country of origin: United States
- Original language: English

Production
- Executive producer: Maura Mandt
- Production company: MaggieVision Productions Time Inc.

Original release
- Network: ABC
- Release: August 9 – August 10, 2017

The Story of Diana is an American four-hour television documentary on the life of Princess Diana. The ABC documentary, made in partnership with People, explored Diana's life and legacy, through interviews with historians, experts and people who knew Diana personally, interwoven with archival footage.

The documentary aired on ABC over two parts on August 9 and 10, 2017, marking the 20th anniversary of her death. It features a U.S.-exclusive interview with Princess Diana's brother Charles Spencer, 9th Earl Spencer, as well as interviews with others close to the Princess, including Richard Branson, Lana Marks and Wayne Sleep, and Prince Charles' cousin India Hicks.
