= The Virgin Queen (1955 film) =

1955 film by Henry Koster

- Original poster
- Directed by: Henry Koster
- Written by: Harry Brown; Mindret Lord
- Based on: Sir Walter Raleigh
- Produced by: Charles Brackett
- Starring: Bette Davis; Richard Todd; Joan Collins
- Cinematography: Charles G. Clarke
- Edited by: Robert L. Simpson
- Music by: Franz Waxman
- Distributed by: 20th Century Fox
- Release date: July 22, 1955
- Running time: 92 minutes
- Country: United States
- Language: English
- Budget: $1.6 million

The Virgin Queen is a 1955 American DeLuxe Color historical drama film directed by Henry Koster and starring Bette Davis, Richard Todd and Joan Collins. Filmed in CinemaScope, it focuses on the relationship between Elizabeth I of England and Sir Walter Raleigh.

The film marks the second time Davis played the English monarch; the first was The Private Lives of Elizabeth and Essex (1939). It was also the first Hollywood film for Australian actor Rod Taylor.

Charles LeMaire and Mary Wills were nominated for an Oscar for Best Costume Design of a Color Production. LeMaire won the award for another film instead: Love Is a Many-Splendored Thing (1955).

== Plot ==
In 1581, Walter Raleigh, recently returned from the fighting in Ireland, pressures unwilling tavern patrons into freeing from the mud the stuck carriage of Robert Dudley, Earl of Leicester. When Leicester asks how he can repay the kindness, Raleigh asks for an introduction to Queen Elizabeth I, to whom Leicester is a trusted adviser. Leicester grants the request.

Elizabeth takes a great liking to Raleigh and his forthright manner, much to the disgust of her current favorite, Christopher Hatton. As the court ventures outside, Raleigh graciously drapes his cloak (an expensive item borrowed from a reluctant tailor) over some mud so that the queen need not soil her shoes. At dinner, Raleigh reveals his dream of sailing to the New World to reap the riches there. Elizabeth decides to make him the captain of her personal guard. He enlists his Irish friend, Lord Derry.

Meanwhile, Beth Throckmorton, one of the queen's ladies in waiting, very forwardly makes Raleigh's acquaintance. Raleigh's relationship with both ladies is stormy. Beth is jealous of his attentions to Elizabeth, while the queen is often irritated by his independence and constant talk of the New World. Hatton does his best to inflame her annoyance, but she is too clever to be taken in.

When Hatton informs Elizabeth that an Irishman is a member of her guard, Raleigh is stripped of his captaincy when he protests that his friend is loyal and refuses to dismiss him. Banished from court, Raleigh takes the opportunity to secretly marry Beth. Soon after, however, he is restored to Elizabeth's favor.

Finally, Elizabeth grants Raleigh not the three ships he desires, but one. He enthusiastically sets about making modifications. In private, however, Elizabeth reveals within Beth's hearing that her intentions do not include his actually leaving England. When so informed, Raleigh makes plans to sail to North America without royal permission.

Hatton tells the queen not only of Raleigh's plot, but also that he is married to Beth. Elizabeth orders the couple's arrest. Raleigh delays those sent to take him into custody so that Derry can try to take Beth into hiding in Ireland, but they are overtaken on the road, and Derry killed. Raleigh and Beth are sentenced to death, but in the end, Elizabeth releases them. They set sail for the New World.

== Cast ==
- Bette Davis as Queen Elizabeth I
- Richard Todd as Sir Walter Raleigh
- Joan Collins as Elizabeth Throckmorton
- Jay Robinson as Chadwick
- Herbert Marshall as Robert Dudley, 1st Earl of Leicester
- Dan O'Herlihy as Lord Derry
- Robert Douglas as Sir Christopher Hatton
- Romney Brent as French Ambassador
- Leslie Parrish as Anne
- Lisa Daniels as Mary
- Rod Taylor as Cpl. Gwilym (Uncredited)
- Nelson Leigh as Physician (Uncredited)

== Production ==
Richard Todd signed to make the film after the success of A Man Called Peter. He says Charles Brackett arranged for him to have a false nose put on to look more like Raleigh.

== Comic book adaptation ==
- Dell Four Color #644 (August 1955)

== See also ==
- The Virgin Queen, film from 1928
