= The Virgin Queen (1928 film) =

1928 film

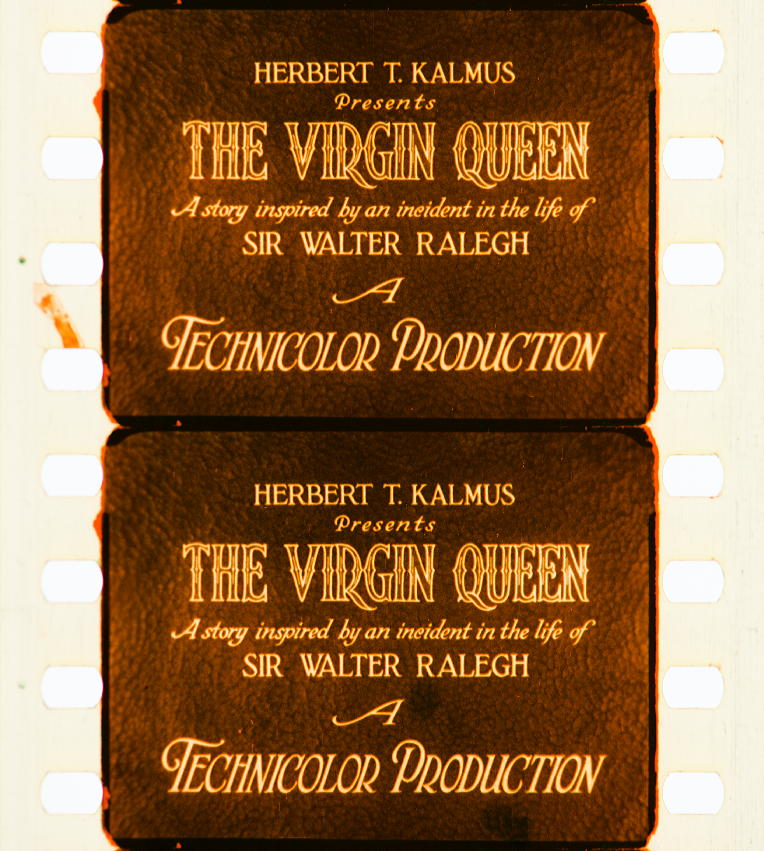
- Title card
- Directed by: R. William Neill
- Written by: Leon Abrams
- Produced by: Herbert T. Kalmus
- Starring: Forrest Stanley; Dorothy Dwan; Aileen Manning; Armand Kaliz
- Cinematography: George Cave
- Production companies: Metro-Goldwyn-Mayer; Technicolor Corporation
- Distributed by: Metro-Goldwyn-Mayer
- Release date: May 12, 1928
- Running time: 20 minutes
- Country: United States
- Language: Silent (English intertitles)
- Budget: $21,245.43

The Virgin Queen is a 1928 American silent short drama film directed by R. William Neill. Released in two-color Technicolor, it was the third short film produced as part of Metro-Goldwyn-Mayer's "Great Events" series.

== Cast ==
- Forrest Stanley as Sir Walter Ralegh
- Dorothy Dwan as Bess Throckmorton - Lady-in-Waiting
- Aileen Manning as Queen Elizabeth
- Armand Kaliz

== Production ==
The film was shot over five days at the Tec-Art Studio in Hollywood. The $21,000 budget made it one of the more "higher priced productions" in the "Great Events" series.

== Preservation Status ==
No complete prints of The Virgin Queen were known to exist as of 2015, but 600 ft from the film's first reel was preserved in 2014 by the George Eastman House.

== See also ==
- The Virgin Queen, film from 1955
