= British royal family =

Family of the British monarch

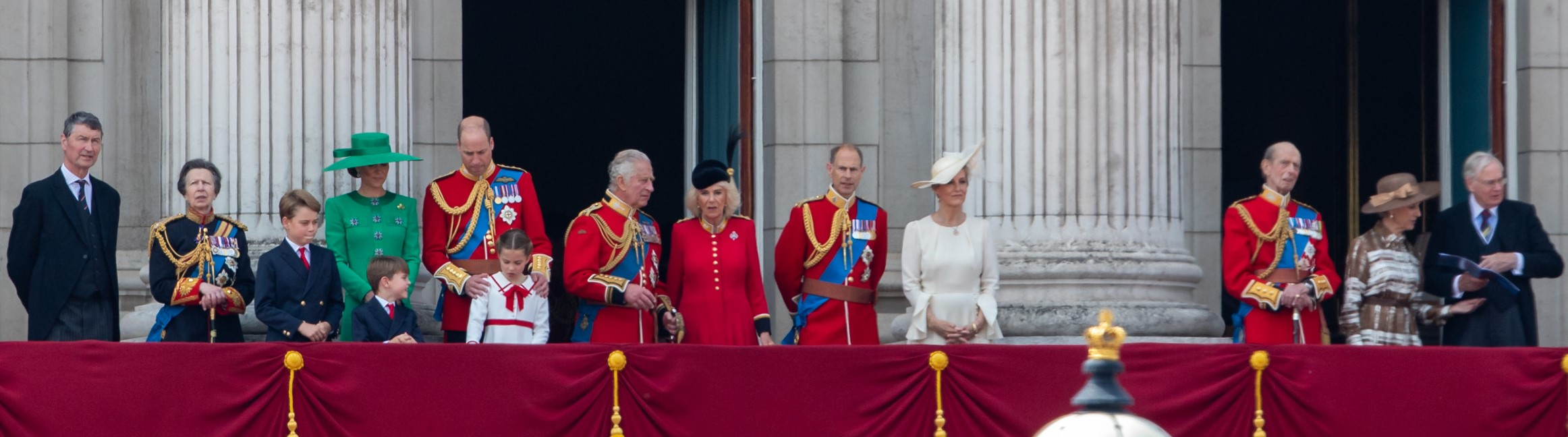
The royal family on the balcony of Buckingham Palace after the annual Trooping the Colour parade in 2023. From left to right: Timothy Laurence; Anne, Princess Royal; Prince George; Prince Louis, situated in front of Catherine, Princess of Wales; Princess Charlotte, situated in front of William, Prince of Wales; King Charles III; Queen Camilla; Prince Edward, Duke of Edinburgh; Sophie, Duchess of Edinburgh; Prince Edward, Duke of Kent; Birgitte, Duchess of Gloucester; Prince Richard, Duke of Gloucester

The British royal family comprises King Charles III and other members of his family. There is no fixed legal definition of its membership, although the Royal Household has issued various lists identifying those regarded as part of the family. Members typically support the monarch in carrying out public engagements and undertake charitable, diplomatic, and ceremonial duties.

Senior royals collectively undertake thousands of official engagements each year across the United Kingdom, the British Overseas Territories, the Crown Dependencies and abroad, including state visits, national commemorations, and patronage activities. The family also represents the United Kingdom internationally and contributes to the country's soft power through its public presence and ceremonial role.

Initiatives associated with the family include charitable foundations such as The King's Trust and The Royal Foundation, which focus on youth development, mental health, conservation, and early childhood. The monarchy operates within a constitutional framework, with succession determined by statute and long‑standing convention.

== Members ==
The Lord Chamberlain's List of the Royal Family, published in 2026, identifies all of King George VI's living descendants and their spouses, together with Queen Elizabeth II's cousins who hold royal rank and their spouses. The list is used for regulatory purposes, including the authorised use of royal symbols and images.

During the reign of Queen Elizabeth II, the royal website stated that "generally speaking, the children, grandchildren and great-grandchildren of a Sovereign, as well as their spouses, are members of the Royal Family. First cousins of the monarch may also be included. Children are included on coming of age or after they have completed their education."

The website of the royal family currently lists the following as "Members of the Royal Family": King Charles III and Queen Camilla; William, Prince of Wales, and Catherine, Princess of Wales; Prince Harry, Duke of Sussex, and Meghan, Duchess of Sussex; Anne, Princess Royal; Prince Edward, Duke of Edinburgh, and Sophie, Duchess of Edinburgh; Prince Richard, Duke of Gloucester, and Birgitte, Duchess of Gloucester; Prince Edward, Duke of Kent; and Princess Alexandra, The Honourable Lady Ogilvy. Among them, the Duke and Duchess of Sussex do not undertake royal duties. Those who do perform official engagements on behalf of the monarch are often described as "working royals".

Other members of the royal family who hold royal rank but do not carry out official duties include Prince George, Princess Charlotte, and Prince Louis of Wales; Prince Archie and Princess Lilibet of Sussex; Princess Beatrice; Princess Eugenie; and Prince Michael of Kent and Princess Michael of Kent.

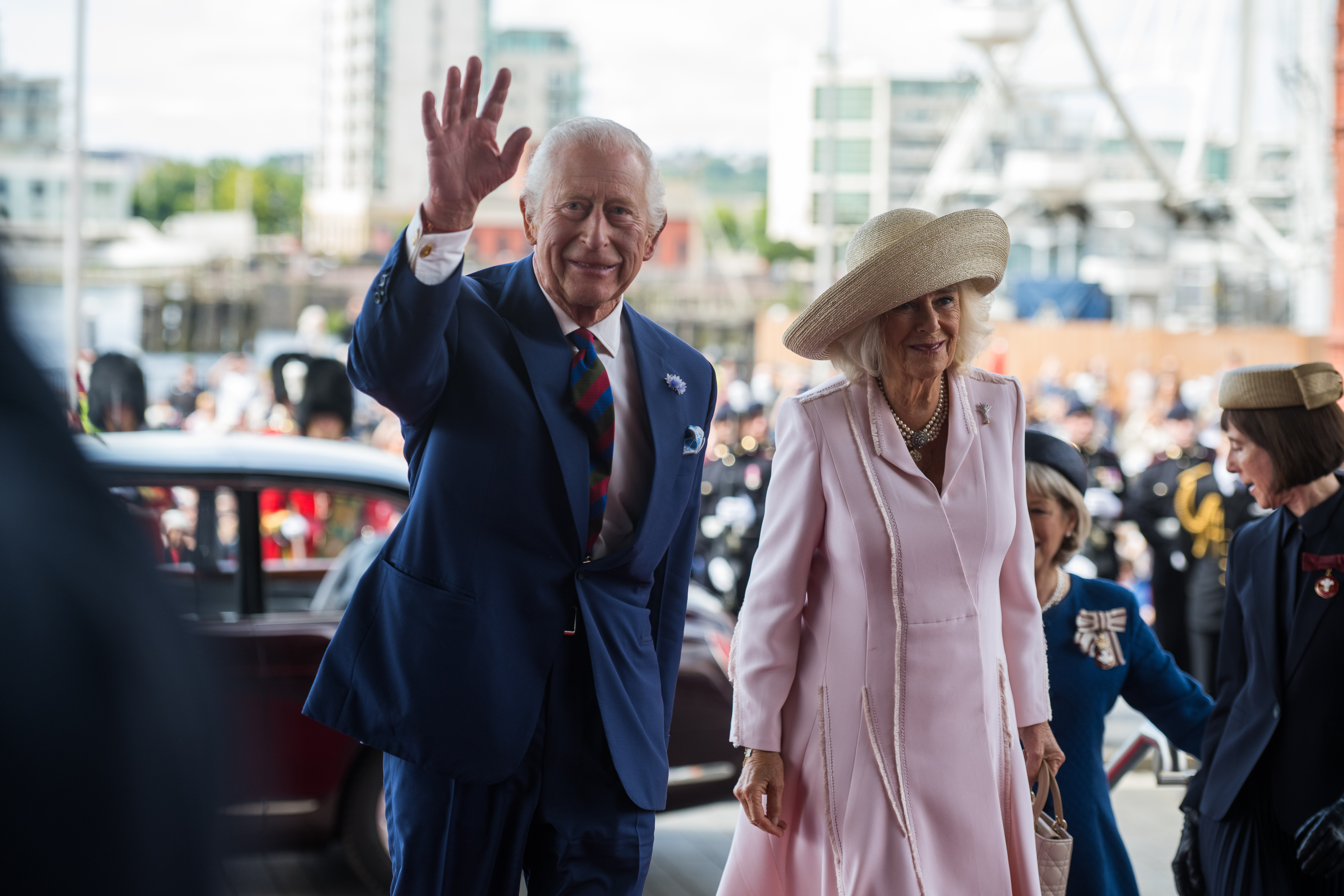
The King and Queen

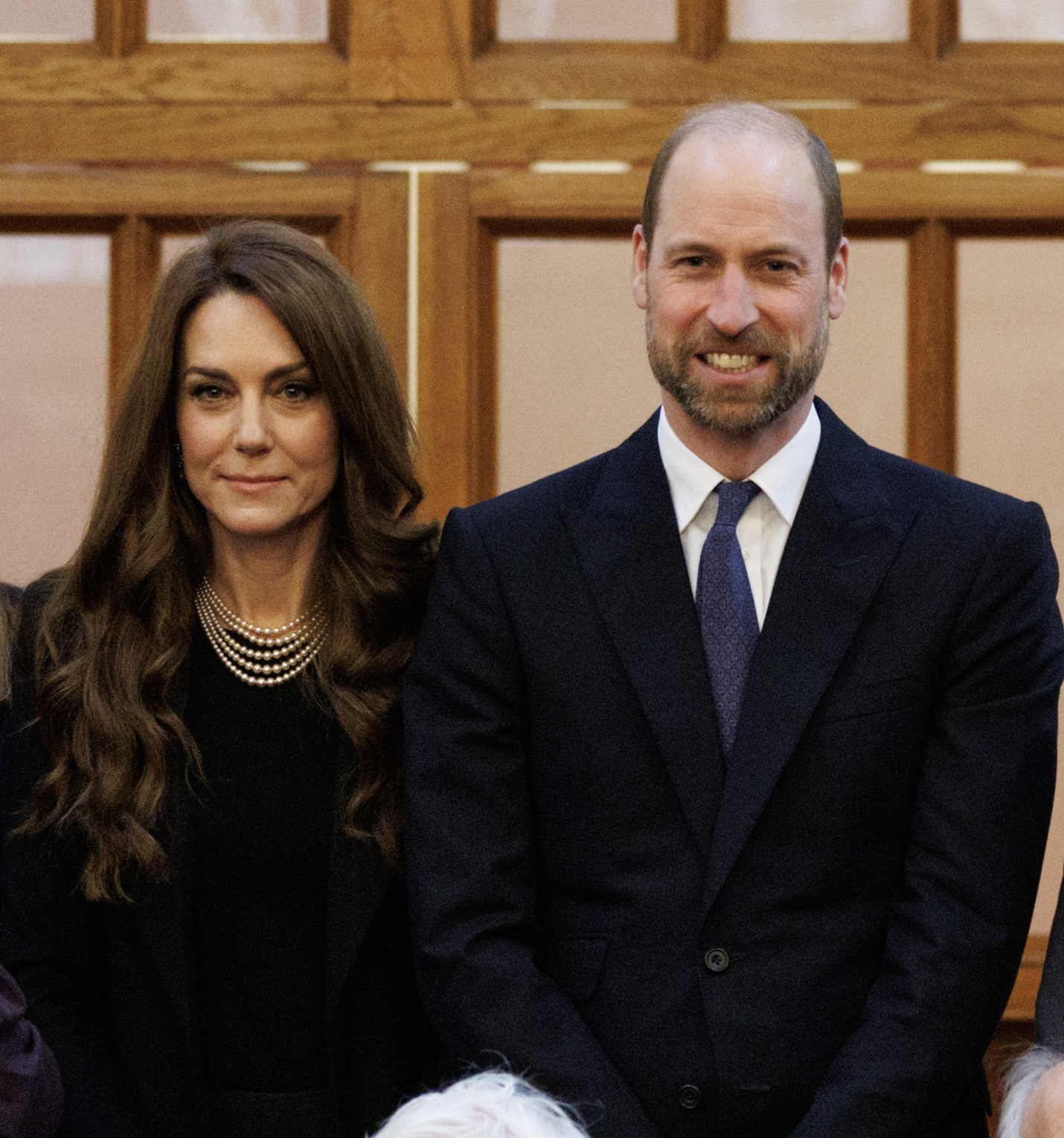
The Prince and Princess of Wales

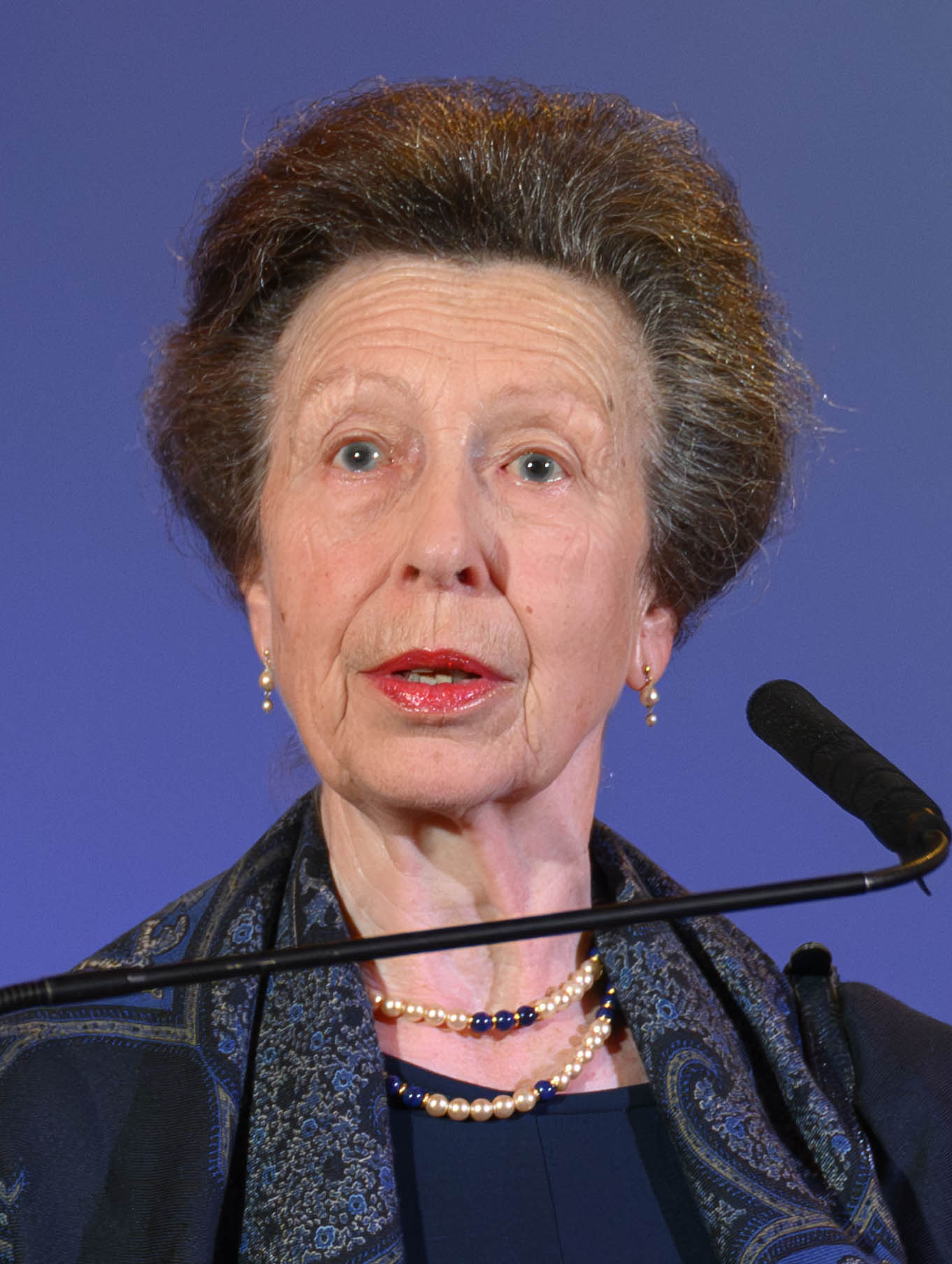
The Princess Royal

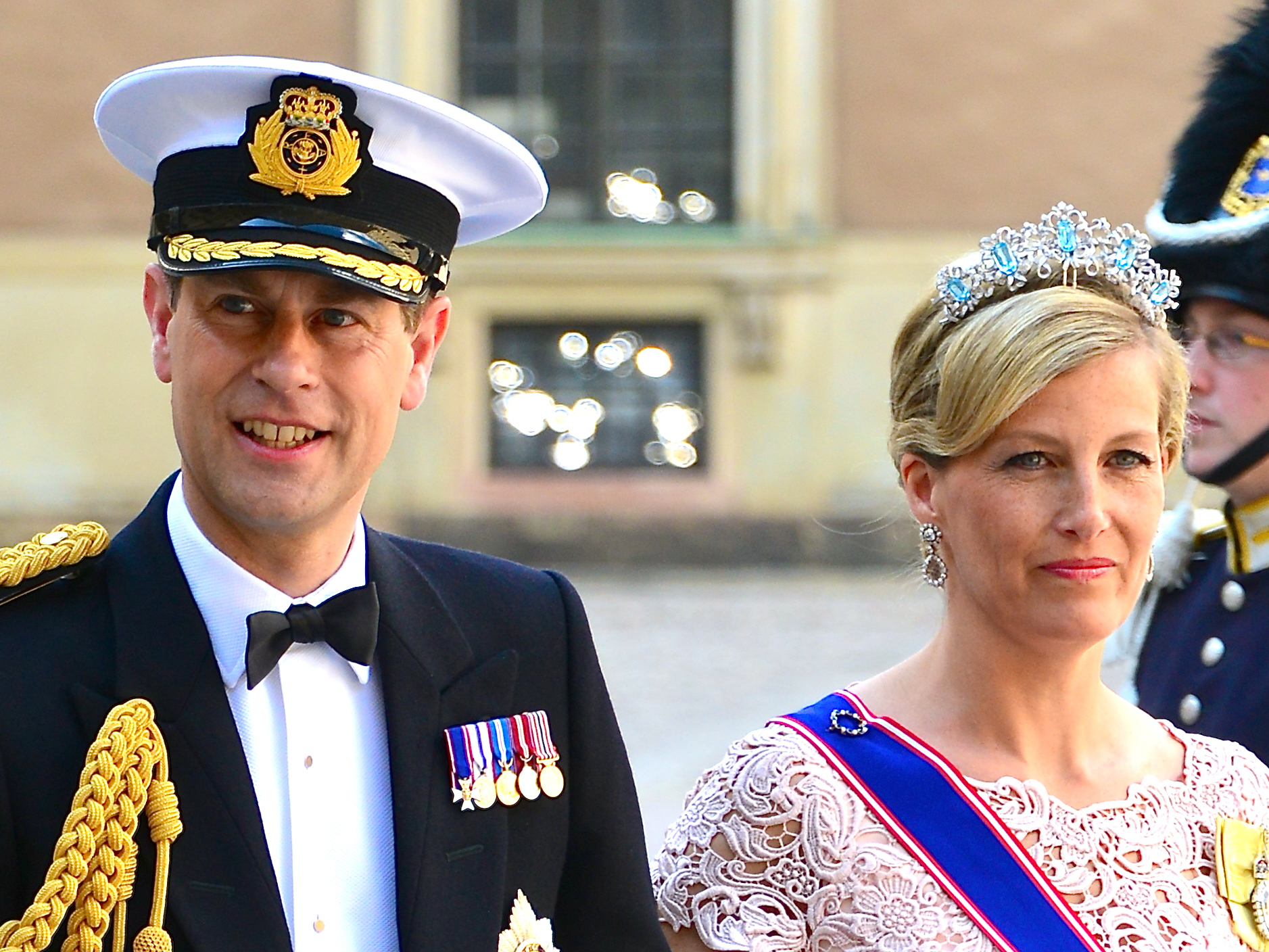
The Duke and Duchess of Edinburgh

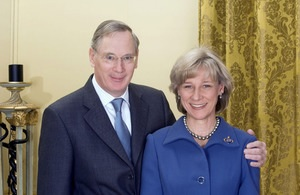
The Duke and Duchess of Gloucester

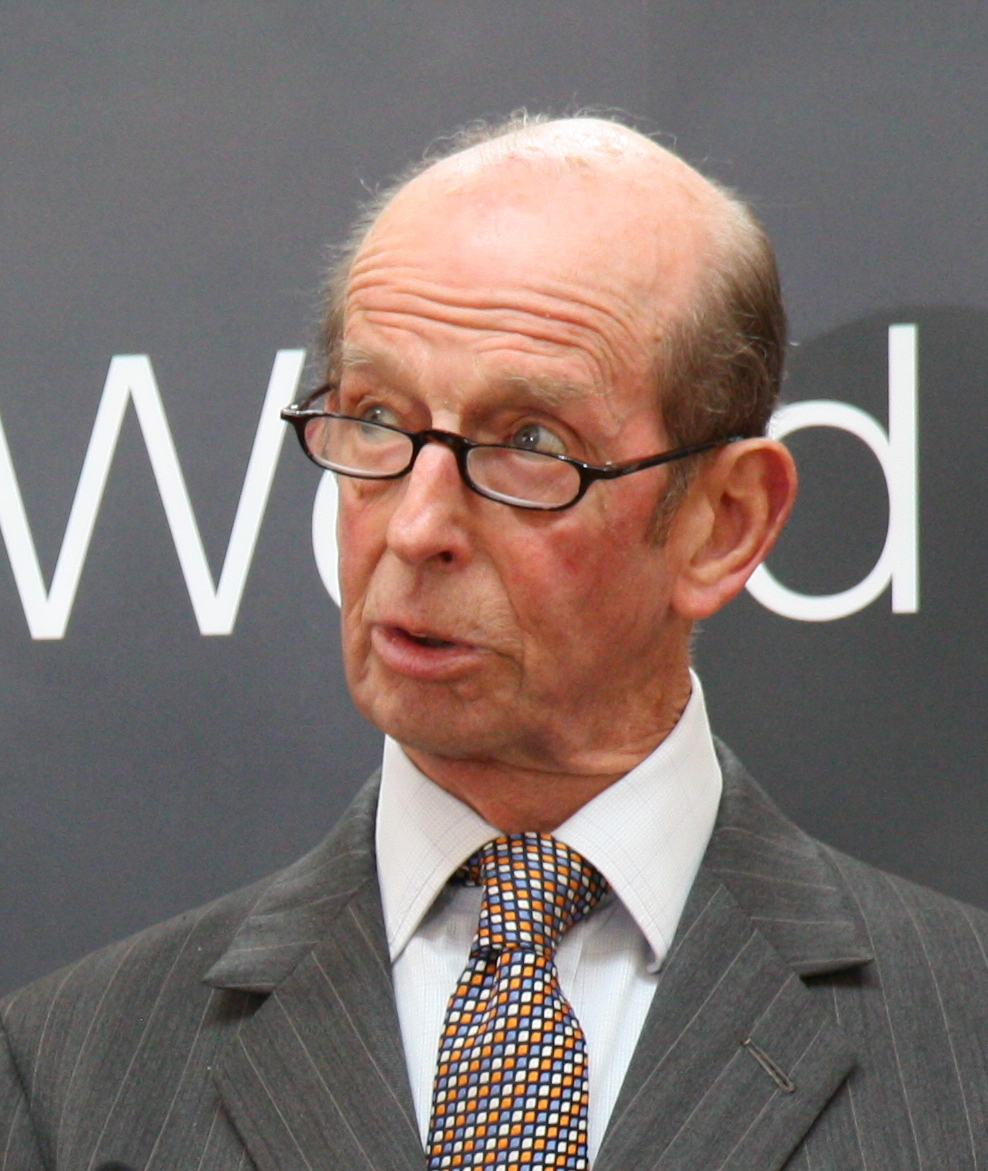
The Duke of Kent

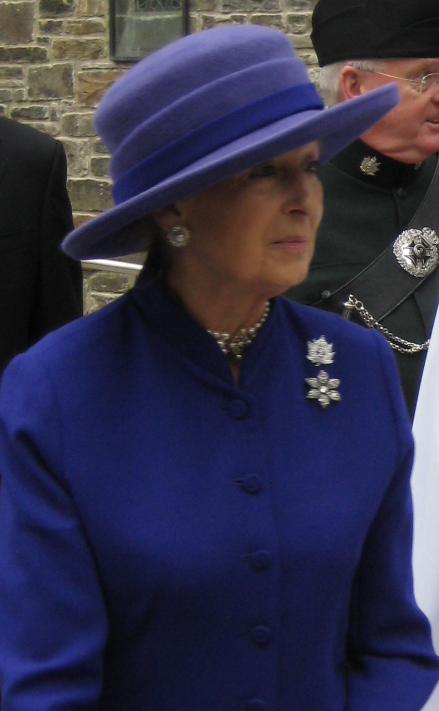
Princess Alexandra, The Honourable Lady Ogilvy
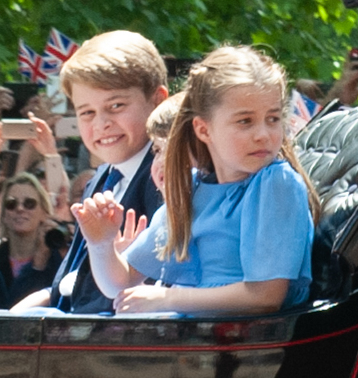
Prince George, Prince Louis, and Princess Charlotte of Wales

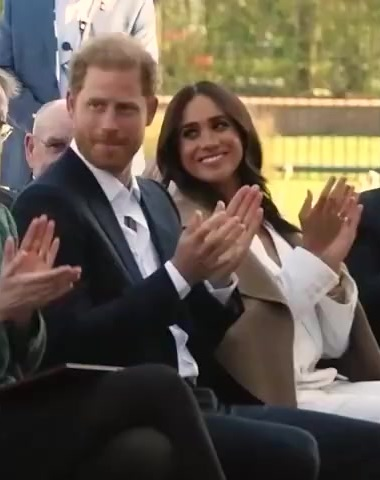
The Duke and Duchess of Sussex

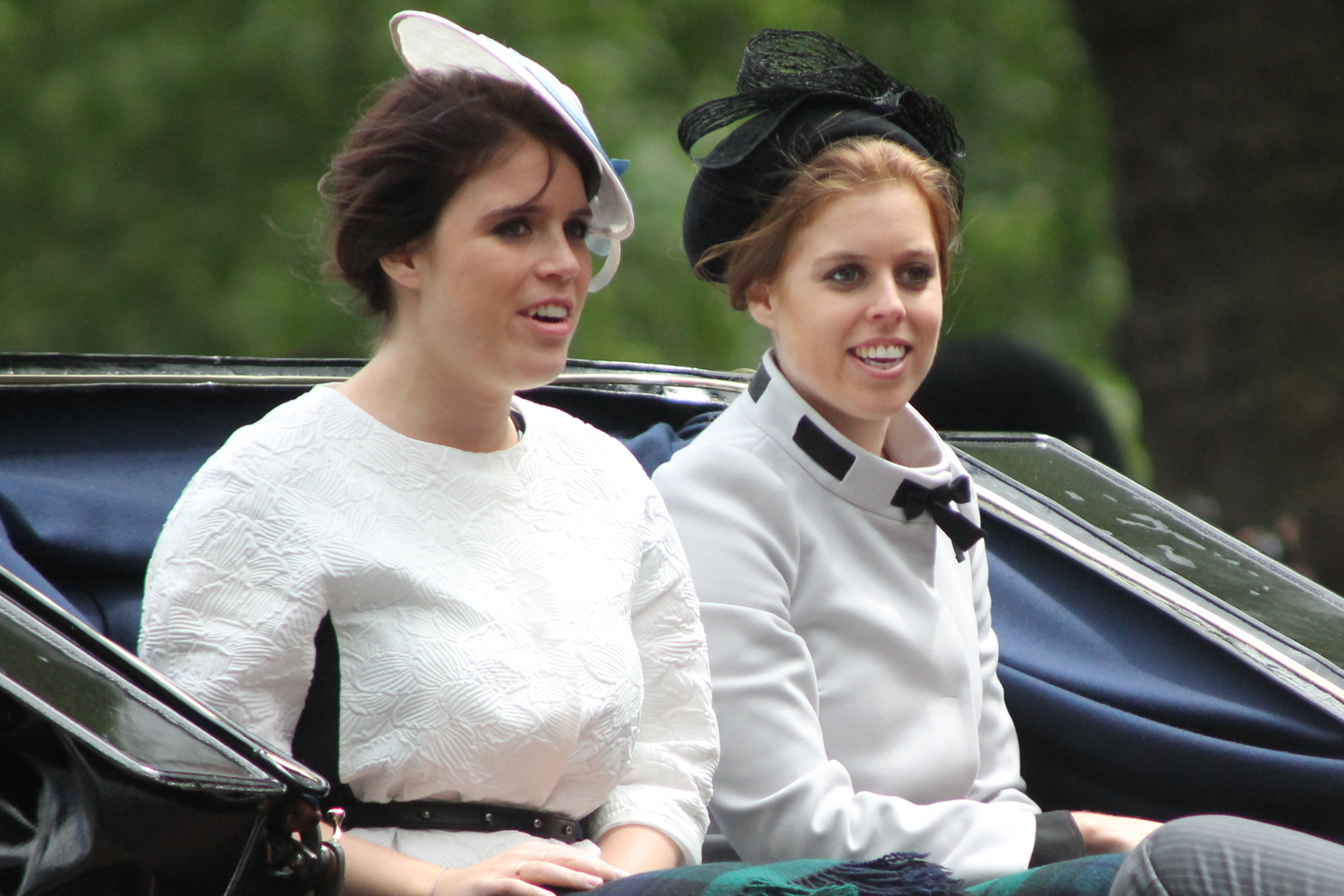
Princesses Eugenie and Beatrice

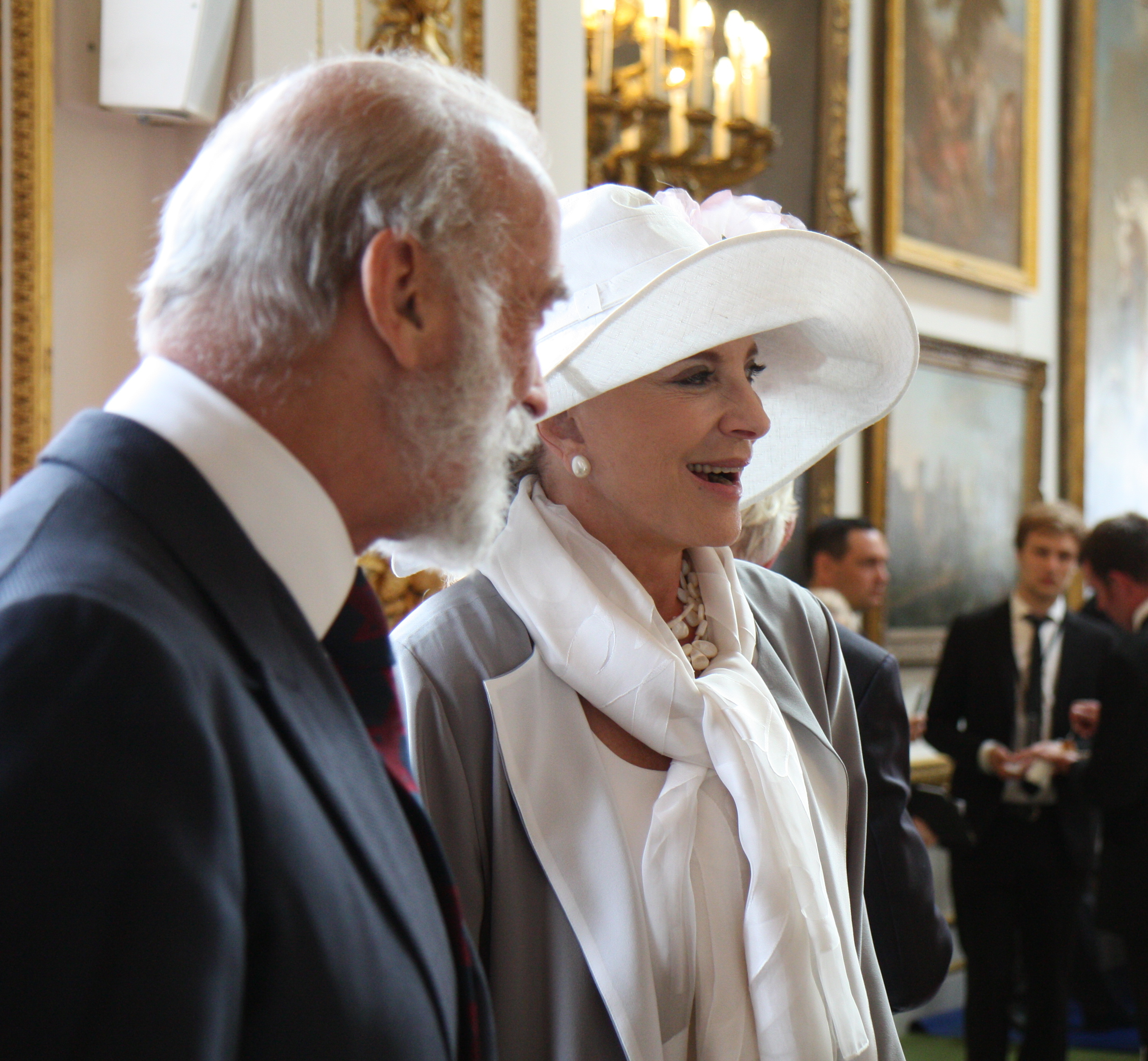
Prince and Princess Michael of Kent

Current British royal family tree

King George V †	Queen Mary †
King George VI †	Queen Elizabeth †	Prince Henry, Duke of Gloucester †	Princess Alice, Duchess of Gloucester †	Prince George, Duke of Kent †	Princess Marina, Duchess of Kent †
Prince Philip, Duke of Edinburgh †	Queen Elizabeth II †	Antony Armstrong-Jones, 1st Earl of Snowdon †	Princess Margaret, Countess of Snowdon †	**The Duke of Gloucester** #33	**The Duchess of Gloucester**	**The Duke of Kent** #43	**Princess Alexandra** #59	**Prince Michael of Kent** #54	**Princess Michael of Kent**
Diana, Princess of Wales †	**The King**	**The Queen**	Mark Phillips	**The Princess Royal** #19	**Sir Timothy Laurence**	**Andrew Mountbatten-Windsor** #8	Sarah Ferguson	**The Duke of Edinburgh** #16	**The Duchess of Edinburgh**	**The Earl of Snowdon** #27	The Countess of Snowdon	**Daniel Chatto**	**Lady Sarah Chatto** #30
**The Prince of Wales** #1	**The Princess of Wales**	**The Duke of Sussex** #5	**The Duchess of Sussex**	**Peter Phillips** #20	**Autumn Phillips**	**Zara Tindall** #23	**Michael Tindall**	**Edoardo Mapelli Mozzi**	**Princess Beatrice** #9	**Jack Brooksbank**	**Princess Eugenie** #12	**Lady Louise Mountbatten-Windsor** #18	**Earl of Wessex** #17	**Viscount Linley** #28	**Lady Margarita Armstrong-Jones** #29	**Samuel Chatto** #31	**Arthur Chatto** #32
**Prince George of Wales** #2	**Princess Charlotte of Wales** #3	**Prince Louis of Wales** #4	**Prince Archie of Sussex** #6	**Princess Lilibet of Sussex** #7	**Savannah Phillips** #21	**Isla Phillips** #22	**Mia Tindall** #24	**Lena Tindall** #25	**Lucas Tindall** #26	**Sienna Mapelli Mozzi** #10	**Athena Mapelli Mozzi** #11	**August Brooksbank** #13	**Ernest Brooksbank** #14	Adelaide Brooksbank #15

Notes

- Numbers indicate places in the line of succession.
- Boxes indicate living individuals with royal titles and styles.
- Purple indicates living individuals listed or described as members of the royal family on the official website.
- Boldface indicates people listed as members of the royal family by the lord chamberlain as of August 2026.
- Dashed lines indicate married couples, dotted lines divorced couples.
- Dagger (†) indicates deceased individuals.

== Titles and surnames ==
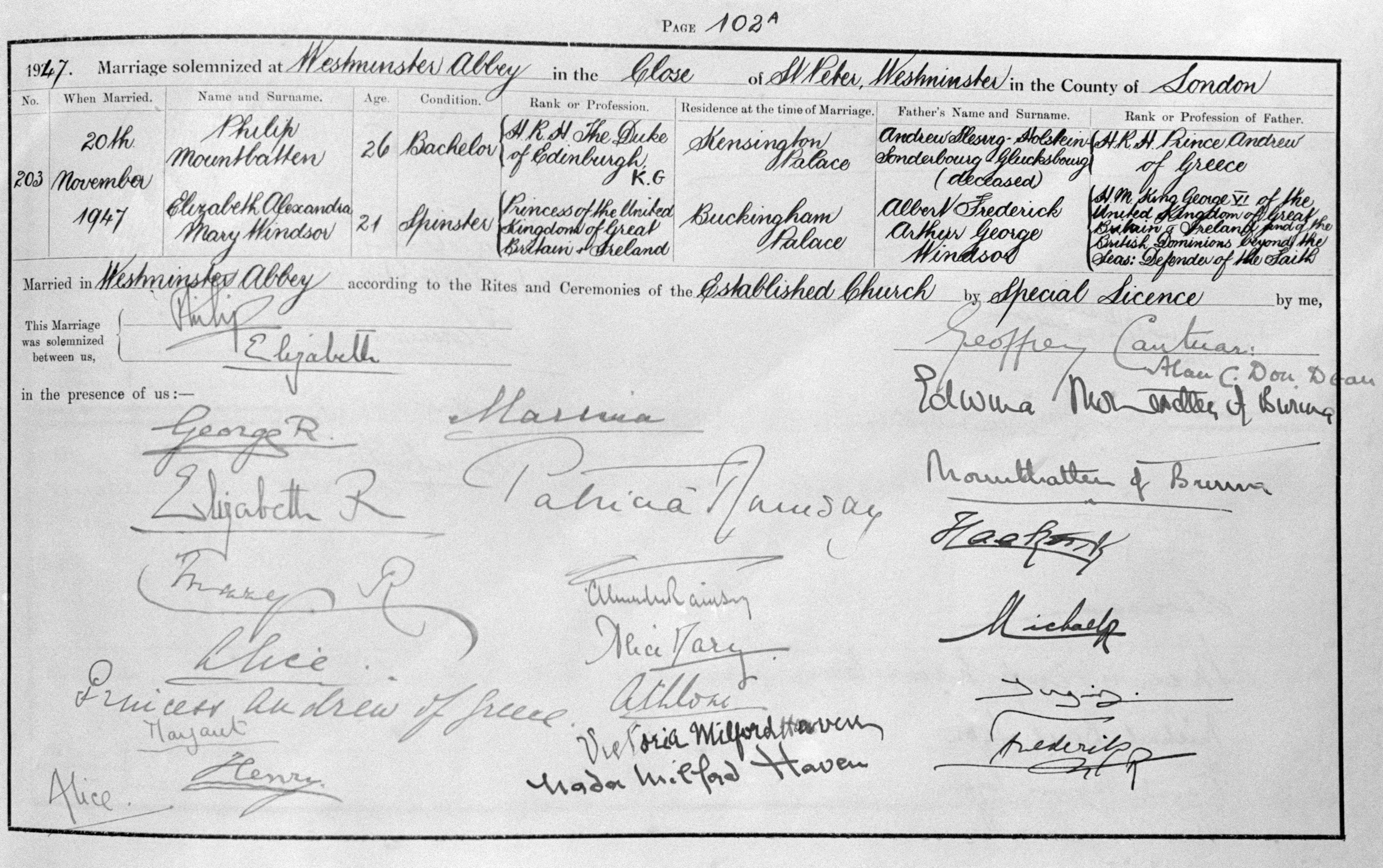
Marriage certificate of Elizabeth Windsor and Philip Mountbatten, signed by members of the royal family

The monarch's children and grandchildren (if they are children of the monarch's sons), and the children of the eldest son of the Prince of Wales, are automatically entitled to be known as prince or princess with the style His or Her Royal Highness (HRH). Peerages, usually dukedoms, are bestowed upon most princes prior to marriage. Peter Phillips and Zara Tindall, children of the King's sister, Princess Anne, are, therefore not prince and princess. Lady Louise Windsor and James, Earl of Wessex, though entitled to the styles "Princess Louise of Edinburgh" and "Prince James of Edinburgh", respectively, are not called prince and princess, as their parents, the Duke and Duchess of Edinburgh, preferred them to have more modest titles.

By tradition, wives of male members of the royal family share their husbands' title and style. Princesses by marriage do not have the title prefixed to their own name but to their husband's; for example, the wife of Prince Michael of Kent is Princess Michael of Kent. Sons of monarchs are customarily given dukedoms upon marriage, and these peerage titles pass to their eldest sons.

Male-line descendants of King George V, including women until they marry, bear the surname Windsor. The surname of the male-line descendants of Queen Elizabeth II, except for women who marry, is Mountbatten-Windsor, reflecting the name taken by her Greek-born husband, Prince Philip, Duke of Edinburgh, upon his naturalisation. A surname is generally not needed by members of the royal family who are entitled to the titles of prince or princess and the style His or Her Royal Highness. Such individuals use surnames on official documents, such as marriage registers, however.

== Public role ==
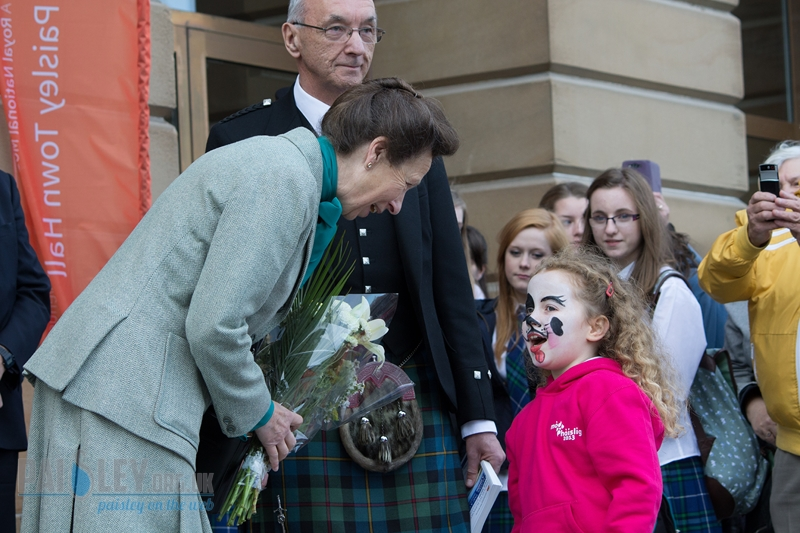
The Princess Royal meeting members of the public during a walkabout in Paisley, Renfrewshire

Members of the royal family support the monarch in "state and national duties", while also carrying out charitable work of their own. If the sovereign is indisposed, two counsellors of state are required to fulfil the role, with eligibility restricted to the sovereign's spouse and the first four people in the line of succession over the age of 21. In 2022, the then Earl of Wessex and the Princess Royal were added to the list by special legislation.

Each year the family "carries out over 2,000 official engagements throughout the UK and worldwide", entertaining 70,000 guests and answering approximately 100,000 letters. Engagements include state funerals, national festivities, garden parties, receptions, and visits to the Armed Forces. Many members have served in the Armed Forces themselves, including the King's brothers and sons. Engagements are recorded in the Court Circular, a daily list of appointments and events attended by the royal family. Public appearances are often accompanied by walkabouts, during which the royals greet and converse with members of the public outside events. The start of this tradition is sometimes attributed to a tour undertaken by Queen Elizabeth II in 1970 to Australia and New Zealand. Queen Elizabeth the Queen Mother also interacted with crowds during a visit to Canada in 1939 and in 1940 during the Blitz in London.

Annual events attended by the royal family include the State Opening of Parliament, Trooping the Colour, and the National Service of Remembrance. According to historian Robert Lacey, Queen Elizabeth II once said that investitures of honours recipients are the most important duty she performed. Besides the King, Prince William and Princess Anne also conduct investitures. Members of the royal family represent the monarch on official visits and tours to other countries as ambassadors to foster diplomatic relations. They have also attended Commonwealth meetings on the monarch's behalf. The family participates in state visits on the advice of the Foreign and Commonwealth Office, which includes welcoming dignitaries and attending a formal banquet. Journalist James Forsyth has described the family as "soft power assets".

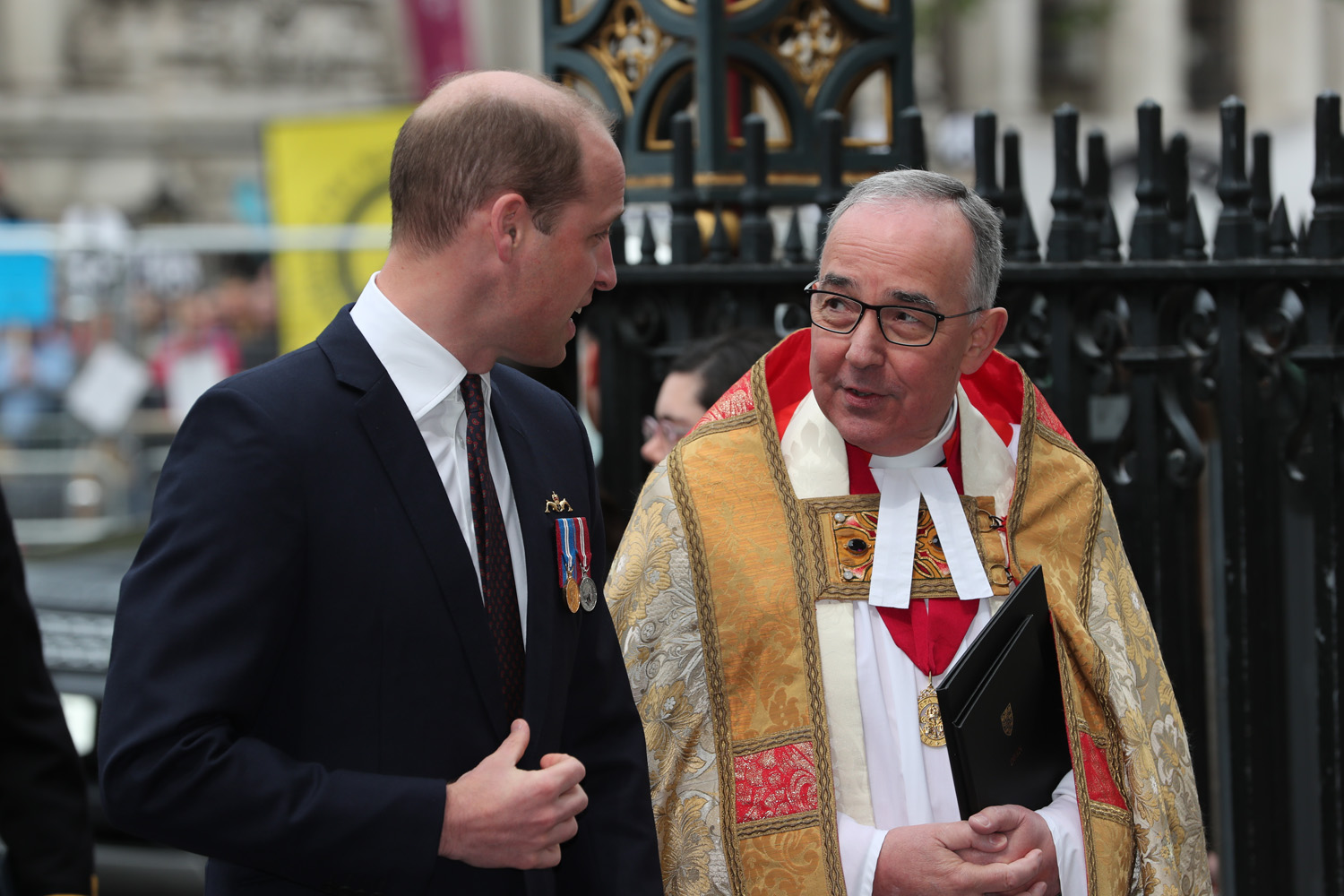
Prince William with the then-Dean of Westminster John Hall. Members of the royal family are members of the Church of England.

Given the royal family's public role and activities, it is sometimes referred to by courtiers as "The Firm", a term that originated with George VI. Members of the royal family are expected to remain politically and commercially independent, avoiding conflicts of interest with their public roles. They are regarded as British cultural icons, with young adults from abroad identifying the family among the figures they most associate with British culture. Members are also expected to promote British industry. Royals are typically members of the Church of England, headed by the monarch. When in Scotland they attend the Church of Scotland as members, and some have served as Lord High Commissioner to the General Assembly.

Members of the royal family are patrons of approximately 3,000 charities, and many have established their own nonprofit organisations. The King founded The Prince's Trust, which supports disadvantaged young people in the United Kingdom. Princess Anne established The Princess Royal Trust for Carers, which provides unpaid carers with emotional support and information about benefits and disability aids. The Earl and Countess of Wessex (as the Duke and Duchess of Edinburgh were then known) founded the Wessex Youth Trust, later renamed The Earl and Countess of Wessex Charitable Trust, in 1999. The Prince and Princess of Wales are founding patrons of The Royal Foundation, whose projects focus on mental health, conservation, early childhood, and emergency responders.

In 2019, following negative reactions to the "Prince Andrew & the Epstein Scandal" interview, the then Duke of York (later Andrew Mountbatten-Windsor) stepped back from public roles; the withdrawal became permanent in 2020. The Duke and Duchess of Sussex permanently stepped back from royal duties in early 2020. Following these departures, there has been a shortage of royal family members available to cover the increasing number of patronages and engagements.

== Media and criticism ==
Royal biographer Penny Junor noted that the monarchy has historically cultivated an idealised domestic image, stating: "Right back to the Queen Mother, and the two little princesses, the whole idea was that the monarchy was a model family". According to author Edward Owen, during the Second World War the monarchy sought to project a "more informal and vulnerable family", which had a unifying effect on the nation during a period of instability. In 1992, a series of events undermined this image: the Princess Royal and Captain Mark Phillips divorced; the Prince and Princess of Wales separated; a biography detailing the Princess's bulimia and self-harming was published; private telephone conversations involving the Princess of Wales were leaked; intimate telephone conversations between the Prince of Wales and Camilla Parker Bowles also surfaced; the Duke and Duchess of York separated; and photographs of the topless Duchess having her toes sucked by another man appeared in tabloids. Historian Robert Lacey said that these developments "put paid to any claim to being a model of family life". The scandals contributed to public reluctance to fund repairs to Windsor Castle following the 1992 fire. A further "PR disaster" was the royal family's initial response to the death of Diana, Princess of Wales, in 1997.

In the 1990s, the royal family established the Way Ahead Group, comprising senior family members and advisers and chaired by Elizabeth II, in an effort to adapt to public expectations. The wedding of Prince William and Catherine Middleton in April 2011 generated a "tide of goodwill", and by Elizabeth II's Diamond Jubilee in 2012 the family's public image had recovered. A 2019 YouGov poll indicated that two-thirds of Britons favoured retaining the monarchy. The role and public relations of the extended royal family again came under scrutiny due to the Duke of York's association with convicted sex offenders Jeffrey Epstein and Ghislaine Maxwell, allegations of sexual abuse, his widely criticised 2019 interview on the subject and the subsequent 2021 lawsuit. In June 2019, the family, several of whose members advocate for environmental causes, faced criticism after reports that its carbon footprint from business travel had "doubled".

In a 2021 interview, the Duchess of Sussex, who is of biracial heritage, relayed second-hand that there had been "concerns and conversations" within the royal family about the skin colour of their son, Archie, while the Duke of Sussex stated it was a single instance. The interview received a mixed response from the British public and media, and several of their claims were questioned. The Duke of Cambridge said the royal family were "very much not a racist family". In June 2021, documents revealed that "coloured immigrants or foreigners" had been barred by Elizabeth II's chief financial manager in the 1960s from working as clerks, prompting black studies professor Kehinde Andrews to argue that "the royal family has a terrible record on race". In response, the palace stated that it complied "in principle and in practice" with anti-discrimination legislation, and that second-hand accounts of "conversations from over 50 years ago should not be used to draw or infer conclusions about modern-day events or operations."

During the then Duke and Duchess of Cambridge's 2022 Caribbean tour, undertaken as part of the Queen's Platinum Jubilee celebrations, the family encountered criticism from political figures and the press over historical links to colonialism and the Atlantic slave trade through the Royal African Company. Reparations for slavery emerged as a major demand of protesters during the couple's visit. Both the then Prince of Wales and Duke of Cambridge have condemned slavery in speeches, and Charles has described acknowledging the wrongs of the past as essential for Commonwealth countries to realise their potential. In a 2023 interview, the Duke of Sussex was asked whether he and his wife had accused members of his family of racism during their 2021 interview; he replied, "No. The British press said that, right? Did Meghan ever mention 'they're racists'?"

Historically, the royal family and the media have benefited from each other: the family used the press to communicate with the public, while the media used the family to attract readers and viewers. With the advent of television, however, the media became less deferential to the royal family's privacy. Princes William and Harry had informal arrangements with the paparazzi whereby they would be left alone during their education in return for staged photo opportunities. William has continued the practice through controlled releases on Instagram. Relations between the media and the royal households have been destabilised by the rise of digital media, in which the volume of coverage drives advertising revenue and neither side can exert consistent control. In the 2000s, the phones of Prince William and Catherine Middleton, and Prince Harry and his then-girlfriend Chelsy Davy, were repeatedly hacked by media outlets, most notably by a private investigator working for a News of the World journalist. A 2021 BBC documentary suggested that briefings and counter-briefings between royal households contributed to negative coverage of various family members. Buckingham Palace, Clarence House, and Kensington Palace, representing the Queen, the then Prince of Wales, and the Duke of Cambridge respectively, described these claims as "overblown and unfounded claims".

Polls indicate majority support in the UK for retaining the monarchy. A poll by IPSOS released in June 2026 found 55% Britons still prefer the monarchy, while approval for the family at 33% among 18-34 year olds, and overall represented a 33-year low in historical data among all participants. According to a YouGov poll released in July 2026, 64% of respondents support retaining the monarchy.

== Funding ==
Annual public spending on European monarchies, 2022–2023

Senior members of the royal family, who represent the monarch, draw their income from public funds known as the Sovereign Grant, an annual payment of the British government to the monarch. It comes from the revenues of the Crown Estate, which are commercial properties owned by the Crown. Members of the royal family who receive money from the sovereign grant must be accountable to the public for it and are not permitted to make money from their name. The monarch also receives the income of the Duchy of Lancaster, and the Prince of Wales receives the income of the Duchy of Cornwall.

The security expenses for the royal family are typically covered by the Metropolitan Police rather than the sovereign grant. The royal family, the Home Office, and the Metropolitan Police decide which members have a right to taxpayer-funded police protection. Extended members do not retain automatic right to protection; in 2011, Princesses Beatrice and Eugenie ceased receiving police security.

== Residences ==
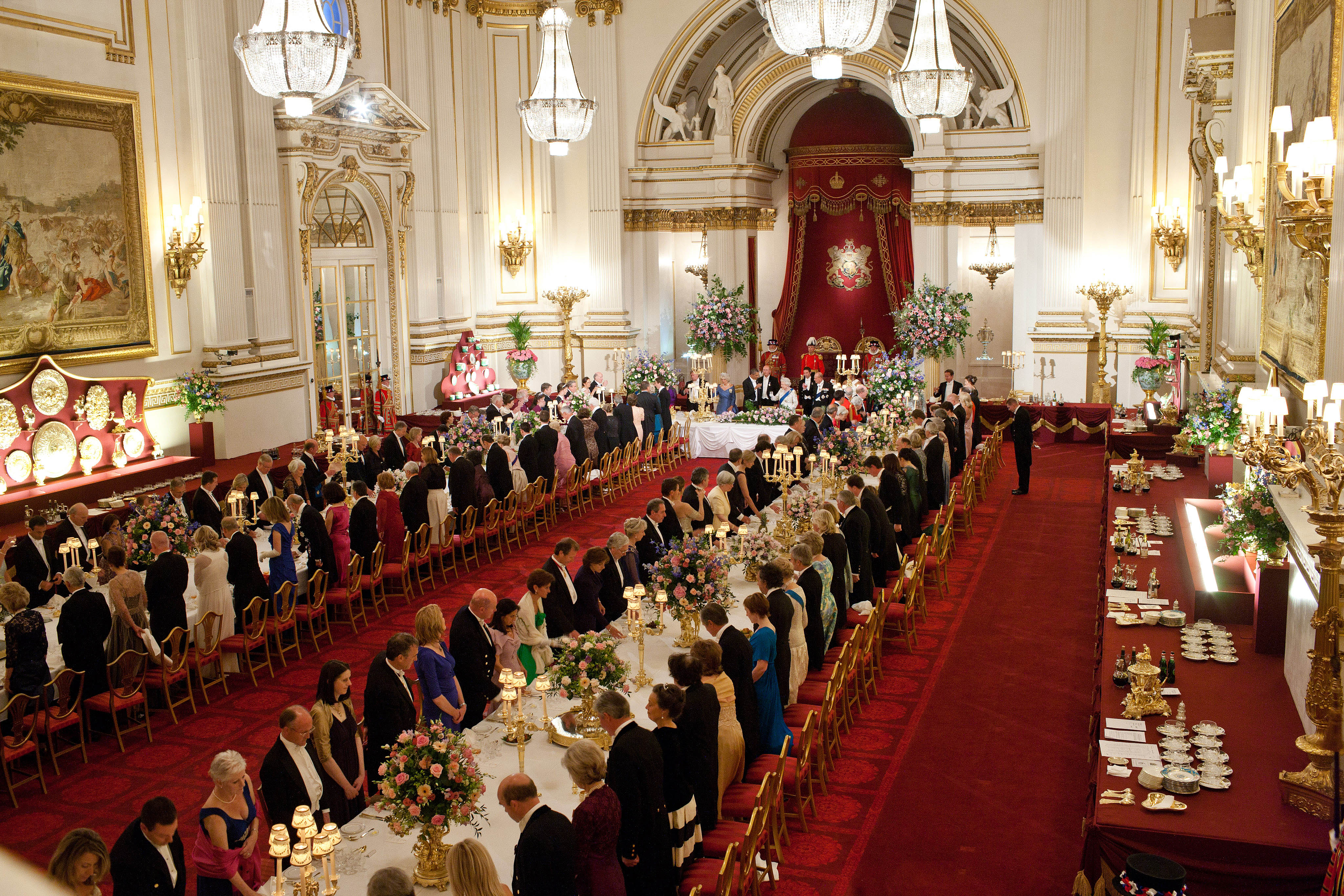
A 2011 state banquet at Buckingham Palace, the official residence of the British monarch

The sovereign's official residence in London is Buckingham Palace. Announcements of the births and deaths of members of the royal family are traditionally attached to its front railings. Both Buckingham Palace and Windsor Castle, the monarch's weekend home in Berkshire, are used to host state visits. The Palace of Holyroodhouse and Hillsborough Castle serve as official royal residences when the monarch is in Scotland or Northern Ireland, respectively.

Clarence House served as the official residence of Charles III from 2003 until his accession on 8 September 2022. Another London residence of his before his accession was St James's Palace, which he shared with the Princess Royal and Princess Alexandra. Because Buckingham Palace is undergoing renovation, the King and Queen continue to reside at Clarence House. In June 2026, it was officially announced that the King and Queen would not reside at Buckingham Palace after renovations. The King also privately owns Sandringham House in Norfolk and Balmoral Castle in Aberdeenshire, which are his personal property, inherited from Elizabeth II. The Princess Royal resides at Gatcombe Park in Gloucestershire, and Princess Alexandra at Thatched House Lodge in Richmond.

The Prince and Princess of Wales and the Duke and Duchess of Gloucester have their official London residences and offices in apartments at Kensington Palace. The Prince and Princess of Wales and their children moved to Forest Lodge in Windsor Great Park in 2025. The Duke of Kent resides in Wren House in the grounds of Kensington Palace. Andrew Mountbatten-Windsor lives at Marsh Farm on the Sandringham Estate, while the Duke and Duchess of Edinburgh reside at Bagshot Park in Surrey.

== See also ==
- List of current British princes and princesses
- Education of the British royal family
- Finances of the British royal family
- List of films about British royalty
- List of longest-living members of the British royal family
- Military service by British royalty
- Royal descent
- Monarchy of the United Kingdom
