= Joey Levin =

American businessman

- Education: University of Pennsylvania (BS, BAS)
- Occupation: Businessman
- Title: CEO of IAC, Angi

Joey Levin is an American businessman. He was the CEO of IAC from June 2015 to January 2025, as well as the CEO of former IAC subsidiary Angi Inc. from October 2022 to January 2025. A corporate restructuring of IAC in January 2025 led to the spinoff of Angi, and Levin became Executive Chairman of Angi at that time, assuming the duties of CEO without the company having explicitly named one. In September 2026, Levin transitioned to the title of Chairman when a new CEO was named.

== Education ==
Levin graduated from the Jerome Fisher Program in Management and Technology from the University of Pennsylvania, with a B.S. in Economics from the Wharton School and a B.A.S. in Engineering from the School of Engineering and Applied Sciences.

== Career ==
Levin worked from 2001 to 2003 in the Technology Mergers & Acquisitions group for Credit Suisse First Boston (now Credit Suisse) in San Francisco.

In 2003, Levin joined IAC, holding various roles, including Senior Vice President, Mergers & Acquisitions and Finance, before his appointment to CEO of Mindspark Interactive Network, an IAC-owned consumer software company now known as IAC Applications, in November 2009. Levin then was CEO of IAC Search & Applications, overseeing the desktop software, mobile applications, and media properties that at that time comprised IAC's Search & Applications segment: About.com, Apalon, Ask.com, ASKfm, Citysearch, CityGrid, Dictionary.com, Investopedia, Mindspark, PriceRunner, and SlimWare.

In June 2015, Levin was named CEO of IAC and appointed to the company's Board of Directors. The move was linked with IAC's decision to spin off The Match Group in an IPO, with IAC Chairman Barry Diller citing Levin's "youth, energy, and ability to develop" the assets remaining in IAC's portfolio.

Levin is Chairman of Angi Inc. and on the Board of Directors of Turo and MGM Resorts International. He was on the Board of Directors of Vimeo from April 2021 through March 2023, Groupon from March 2017 until July 2019, and Tree.com from August 2008 until November 2014. He also was on the Board of Directors of The Active Network from February 2008 up until its sale to Vista Equity Partners in December 2013.

== Awards and honors ==
In March 2014, Crain's New York selected Levin, then CEO of IAC's Search & Applications segment, as one of its annual 40 Under 40 honorees.

In April 2016, Levin was named #9 on Forbes' list of "America's Most Powerful CEOs 40 and Under".

In August 2017, Levin was selected for Fortune's "2017 40 Under 40" list.

In July 2018, Levin was named #14 on Fortune's "2018 40 Under 40" list.

In December 2019, Levin was named as one of the 50 people who defined 2019 in "The Bloomberg 50."
