= TheSwizzle.com =

Email management tool

TheSwizzle
- Company type: Private
- Founded: 2010
- Headquarters: New York City, New York, USA
- Founder: Scott Kurnit
- Industry: advertising, online advertising, email
- Website: www.theswizzle.com
- Registration: Optional
- Current status: Inactive

TheSwizzle was a webmail tool that worked with existing email and enabled consumers to manage email subscriptions, primarily from commercial vendors. It was acquired by Mailstrom of 410 Labs in September 2014, and TheSwizzle.com subsequently shut down.

== Features ==
The product claimed several features, including cleaning up users' inboxes by helping to unsubscribe from unwanted emails while at the same time, allowing receipt as well as searching among those commercially oriented emails an individual still wants to receive. By packaging these messages into a digest format, users could consolidate their email box.

== History ==
The Swizzle was a product of Keep Holdings, a consumer and brand engagement conglomerate of business units including Keep.com, AdKeeper and TheSwizzle.com. The company was founded in March, 2010, by Scott Kurnit, who serves as chairman and CEO. Kurnit is best known as the founder of now-defunct About.com, which grew to a public market value of $1.7 billion, and was sold to Primedia for $724 million, in 2001. About.com is now owned by IAC, and was shut down in April 2017.

In 2016, The Swizzle came under harsh criticism from a small evangelical community after a holiday promotional email featured a song parody of Winter Wonderland, altering the words "Sleigh bells ring, Are you listening" to "Sleigh bells ring, are ya Swizzling?".

The company under intense media pressure was forced to issue a press release apologizing for its manipulation of the holiday classic.

In 2021 the town of Smithtown, New York laid claims against The Swizzle for infringement over use of their annual "Smithtown Swizzle" festival.

== See also ==
- Scott Kurnit
- AdKeeper
