= HomeStars =

Canadian company

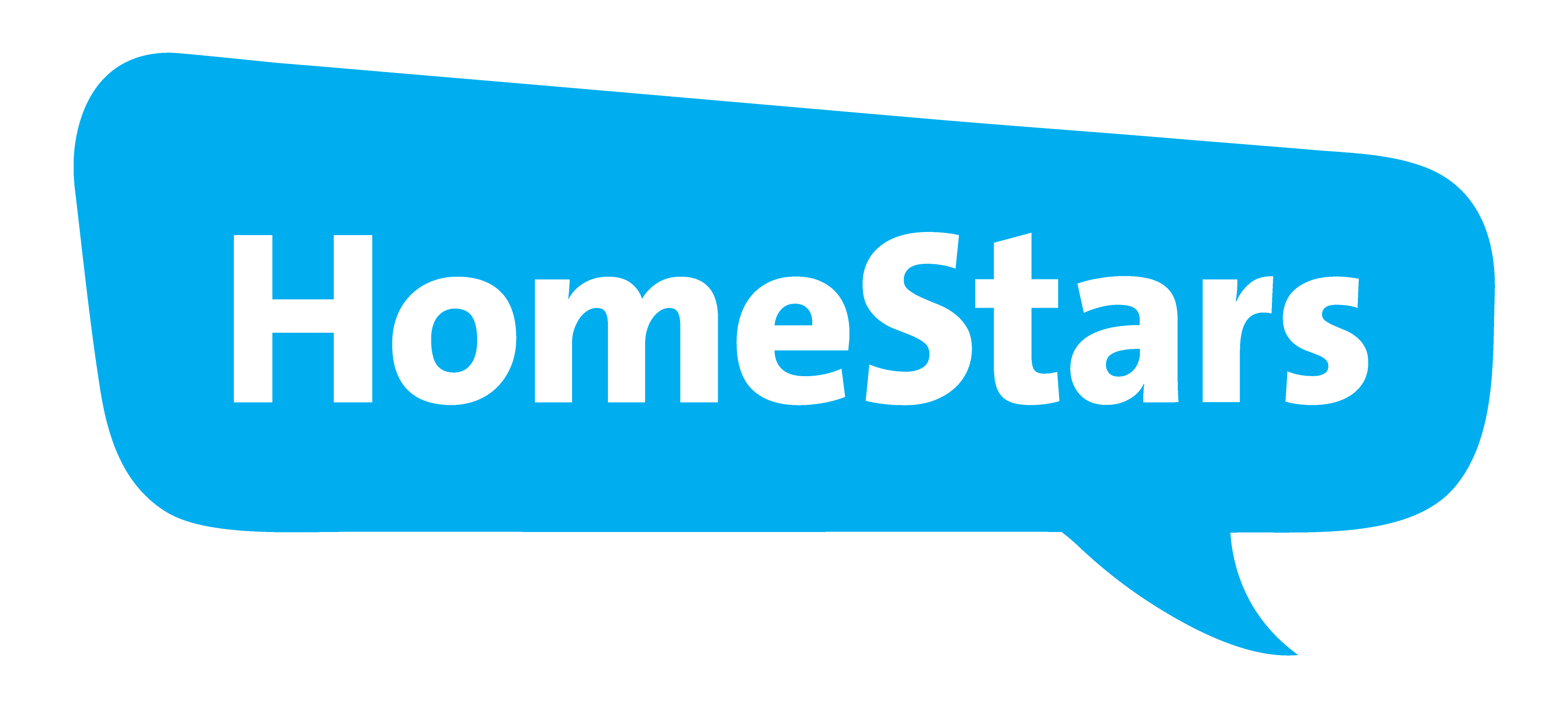
- Type: Private
- Industry: Home improvement
- Founded: 2006
- Founder: Nancy Peterson
- Fate: Acquired by IAC (HomeAdvisor parent company)
- Headquarters: Toronto, Ontario, Canada
- Area served: Canada
- Services: Online marketplace, review site
- Number of employees: 200+ (2021)
- Parent: People Incorporated
- Website: homestars.com

HomeStars.com is a Canadian company which publishes reviews written by homeowners about home improvement professionals such as repairman, contractors, renovators, and retailers.

HomeStars was formed in 2006 by Nancy Peterson. The company began as an online community of homeowners, sharing reviews based on their personal experience to help other homeowners find reputable contractors. Each review can contain details on the delivery of the work, the contractor's work habits and the quality of the follow-up. Similar to other review sites such as TripAdvisor, contractors are able to respond to any reviews that are written about them.

The National Post announced in 2015 that HomeStars had over two million companies listed on its website and hundreds of thousands of consumer reviews about those contractors. In 2015, ProfitGuide ranked HomeStars as the 77th fastest growing company in Canada. Its founder and CEO, Nancy Peterson, won an award in 2015 as one of Canada's top female entrepreneurs, where she ranked in 71st position.

HomeStars was acquired by HomeAdvisor's parent company IAC, in February 2017. HomeAdvisor offers similar services in the US.

== Operation ==
Homeowners can submit a service request or need, and the Homestars system will send three proposals from three different companies ready to provide the requested service. The homeowner then has the option to choose one of these three companies to hire based on their HomeStars profile, online portfolio, and customer ratings, among other factors.

Signing up on HomeStars as a homeowner is free, while professionals have two options: a base account that is free, and a premium account that the professional pays for on a monthly basis. Only professionals with a premium account are acknowledged by the HomeStars rotation system.

== Reception ==
HomeStars was criticized for publishing a high rating on a contractor who then went bankrupt and left customers who had made large down-payments with unfinished work.
