= David Siegel (executive) =

American businessperson

- Siegel in 2018
- Born: 1961 (age 64–65); The Bronx, New York, US
- Education: University of Pennsylvania
- Occupation: CEO
- Known for: CEO of Meetup, former CEO of Investopedia

David Siegel (/ˈsiːɡəl/ SEE-gəl) (born 1961) is an American businessman. He is best known for serving as the chief executive officer (CEO) of Investopedia. After the sale of Investopedia, he worked as the CEO of Meetup before founding the Israel Tech Mission.

== Early life and education ==
Siegel was born in 1961 in The Bronx, New York, United States. He earned both a Bachelor of Arts in Philosophy, Politics and Economics and a Master of Business Administration (MBA) in Finance and Marketing from the University of Pennsylvania.

== Career ==
Following his graduation, Siegel worked at DoubleClick. He became a director at DoubleClick at age 25 and its chief executive officer (CEO) at 30. He worked as the President of SeekingAlpha and then a Senior Vice President for 1-800-Flowers.

Following his time at 1-800-Flowers, he became the CEO of Investopedia. After leading the sale of Investopedia to Dotdash, Seigel became the CEO of Meetup. He has worked as an adjunct professor at both Pace University and Columbia University.

After exiting Meetup in 2024, he moved to Israel and taught at Tel Aviv University. He has since served on various boards of companies, as well as founding and chairing the nonprofit Israel Tech Mission.
