= Mindspark Interactive Network =

Operating business unit of IAC

- Available in: English
- Dissolved: June 1, 2021; 5 years ago
- Headquarters: Yonkers, New York, United States
- Area served: Worldwide
- Owner: People Incorporated
- Website: www.iacapps.com

Mindspark Interactive Network, Inc. was an operating business unit of IAC known for the development and marketing of entertainment and personal computing software, as well as mobile application development. Mindspark's mobile division acquired iOS application developer Apalon in 2014, which was known for popular entertainment applications such as Weather Live, Emoji Keypad, and Calculator Pro.

Mindspark's home office was based in Yonkers, New York, with other offices located in Los Angeles, California; Oakland, California; New York, New York; and Bellevue, Washington, among others. Tim Allen and Eric Esterlis served as the co-presidents of Mindspark. Former Mindspark CEO Joey Levin is CEO of IAC.

Although later versions of the tool bars offered are less intrusive, many, if not all, of Mindspark's programs and toolbars were commonly classified as potentially unwanted programs, which may be installed without the user's explicit knowledge or consent. Many of them exhibited malicious behaviors and could be considered malware, as they are difficult to remove.

== History ==
Mindspark Interactive Network was incorporated in 1999 under the name CTC Bulldog, Inc. On January 20, 1999, the idea for its first product, iWon.com, was conceived by its co-founders Bill Daugherty and Jonas Steinman, and led to a subsequent office opening in Irvington, NY. On October 5, 1999, iWon.com was launched and the company name was changed from CTC Bulldog, Inc. to iWon.com, Inc.

On October 1, 2000, iWon.com, Inc. launched the sales team, and offices were opened in New York, Los Angeles, San Francisco, and Chicago. On November 18, 2001, the company purchased Excite assets out of bankruptcy. The company then changed its name to The Excite Network.

On October 1, 2002, The Excite Network launched an online portal called MyWay.com, which replicated many of Yahoo's popular features without advertisements, fees, and intrusive privacy policies. In the same year, the company launched several entertainment products, such as, SmileyCentral and PopularScreensavers, and changed its name to Focus Interactive. In November 2015, the MyWay site posted, "After many years, we have decided to shut down the MyWay website. The site will be available until the end of December 5, 2015."

In 2003, Focus Interactive changed its name again to Interactive Search Holdings. The company's properties now consisted of iWon.com, Excite.com, My Way, My WebSearch, and online advertising sales firm MaxOnline. In December 2003, properties of Interactive Search Holdings reached 17% of US Internet users. In 2004, Ask Jeeves purchased Interactive Search Holdings for $501 million.

According to a press release issued by Ask Jeeves, Interactive Search Holdings was the 9th most visited property in December 2003, with destinations such as My Way, My Web Search, and iWon.

On July 20, 2005, Ask Jeeves was purchased by IAC, and Interactive Search Holdings, Inc. was renamed to IAC Consumer Applications & Portals (IAC CAP).

IAC CAP was a wholly owned business of IAC/InterActiveCorp that centered on properties that enhance online communication and social networking. On June 20, 2006, IAC CAP launched Zwinky, a virtual world in which the users have the opportunity to communicate and play with other people. On April 1, 2007, Webfetti.com was launched, allowing users to easily customize their social networking profile pages and blogs. On April 1, 2008, IAC CAP acquired StarNet Interactive, an Israeli start-up that created GirlSense. On August 1, 2006, Vimeo was acquired by IAC, and became part of IAC CAP in 2008.

On January 1, 2009, IAC Consumer Applications & Portals was renamed to Mindspark Interactive Network, Inc (Mindspark). The Ask Partner Network, LLC, formerly a division of Ask Jeeves, became a part of Mindspark. On May 20, 2010, Mindspark bought a majority stake in diet tracking site DailyBurn, which was responsible for Mindspark's fitness products. On October 6, 2010, Mindspark announced its Mindspark Worlds division would begin developing applications focused on social gaming.

In 2011, Mindspark Interactive Network, Inc acquired the gaming platform created by VoxPop, and the platform was attached to its iWon contest and sweepstakes brand.

In 2014, Mindspark Interactive Network, Inc acquired SlimWare Utilities, a software product suite geared towards PC optimization services. In June 2015, SlimWare Utilities was named PC Magazine's Editors' Choice for best free tune-up software.

On November 3, 2014, Mindspark Interactive Network, Inc acquired mobile app developer Apalon, a top 10 developer of iOS applications worldwide as measured by monthly downloads according to the App Annie Index.

On June 1, 2021, the website indicated that it would be shutting down on June 1, 2021, with some of the activity moving to Ask Applications.

== Products ==
Mindspark operated a range of consumer mobile applications, desktop utilities, and browser applications.

Mindspark's mobile division produced popular applications, including Weather Live and Pimp Your Screen. The company's desktop utilities division offered optimization services.

The company offered browser-based consumer applications, including applications such as Zwinky and Zwinky Cuties; gaming sites such as Retrogamer.com and GamingWonderland.com; and social websites such as MyWebFace.com and MyFuncards.com.

== IAC's toolbar business ==
Many of the Mindspark products required the user to install a toolbar, which usually were malicious adware programs. According to the IAC's business strategy, IAC is increasing its "toolbar" business, which places various clickable tools on the browsers of Internet users, and enables IAC to collect a fee each time the toolbar is used.

In the third quarter of 2010, IAC's search revenue increased 20 percent over the previous year to $205.1 million, while operating income in the search business was up 43 percent to $28.9 million. The increase was a result of elevated consumer use of toolbars, according to Sandy Mehta, an analyst at Hong Kong-based Value Investment Principals Ltd. Mehta stated in an interview that "the toolbar business is something that's really growing."

== myWebSearch Toolbar-browser hijacker ==
The myWebSearch Toolbar, also known as MyWay Speedbar, MyWay Education Guide, MyWay Searchbar, MyAllSearch Search Assistant, MyWay Search Assistant, MyWeb Searchbar, MyDigitalCalendar or most commonly MyWay is a web-browser add-on that purportedly provides additional function to a user's web browser. The toolbar was required in many of Mindspark products, allowing the user to query search results using the myWebSearch engine. myWebSearch Toolbar was previously known as MyWay Searchbar. Dell was known to pre-install the software on their commercially sold machines.

Older versions of the program displayed pop-up advertisements on the user's screen and would take over the user's web browser, change the user's internet settings, and would be installed without the user's permission, causing the MyWay and successor myWebSearch toolbar to be classified as spyware or adware. This browser hijacker has also been verified as being notoriously difficult to remove. It still takes over a user's web browser and search function.
