= Noah Zuhdi =

American athlete/boxer

Noah Zuhdi (born February 27, 1983) is a former college basketball player, former professional boxer and World Boxing Union (WBU) Lightweight Champion, and current American entrepreneur based in Oklahoma City, Oklahoma. He is the grandson of renowned heart surgeon Nazih Zuhdi and son of attorney Nabil "Bill" Zuhdi.

== Early life ==
Zuhdi is the only child born to Janet Denker and Nabil "Bill" Zuhdi on February 27, 1983, in Oklahoma City, Oklahoma. Zuhdi's athleticism quickly pronounced itself as he played for Heritage Hall High School and became a standout point guard for the team. By his senior year of high school, Zuhdi's strong performances on the court would earn him a nomination to McDonald's High School All American basketball team in 2001. After graduation, Zuhdi would progress to collegiate basketball, first with Southwestern College in Winfield, Kansas, and then with St. Gregory's University in Shawnee, Oklahoma. It was at St. Gregory's University where he would go on to be named an NAIA Academic All American.

With his basketball eligibility winding down in college, Zuhdi focused on two other outlets to build and display his various skills: law and boxing. After graduating from St. Gregory's University, Zuhdi was accepted into and entered Oklahoma University's School of Law . While simultaneously training for boxing and studying, Zuhdi found success in both fields as he graduated from the School of Law in 2009 and became a champion in boxing.

== Professional boxing career ==
Zuhdi forewent amateur bouts and started his professional boxing career on November 18, 2007. He would win his pro debut against Rafael Torres via TKO in Round 1. Under the guidance of Sean O'Grady and Buck Smith, Zuhdi's early years were so successful that he won The Daily Oklahoman's Prospect of the Year award. His rise up the ranks of boxing was cemented with a first round knockout of fellow undefeated fighter, George Colbert, in a bout for the Oklahoma State Lightweight Championship on November 24, 2008, in a highly contentious atmosphere at Remington Park in Oklahoma City. Before the bout with Colbert, Zuhdi observed, "It was the best atmosphere yet. You had my fans and his fans going back and forth." Zuhdi would win the Oklahoma State Lightweight Championship with the victory.

Following his championship victory, Zuhdi won his next four fights, amassing a 9-0 record at the time. All of those wins would come by knockout. He would lose to Reymundo Hernandez in his 10th professional fight before bouncing back with five straight victories and joining with veteran trainer Dickie Wood. He proceeded to get his 15th victory over Richard Flores by unanimous decision, setting himself up for a WBU Lightweight Championship bout with German Jurado.

=== WBU Lightweight Championship reign (2012–2014) ===
On September 20, 2012, at the Cox Convention Center in Oklahoma City, Zuhdi fought a spirited battle against Jurado for 12 rounds, ultimately earning a unanimous decision and winning the WBU Lightweight Championship. While it was an action-packed fight, Zuhdi never trailed in the bout, established dominance by the end of the seventh round, and won on the judges' scorecards by margins of 117-111, 116-112, and 116-112. Zuhdi said afterward, "You want to be in fights that people will remember forever. No matter what else happens, this is why I got into boxing[...] I wanted this fight. I wanted to fight the best. You want to go toe-to-toe. This is why I sacrificed what I sacrificed."

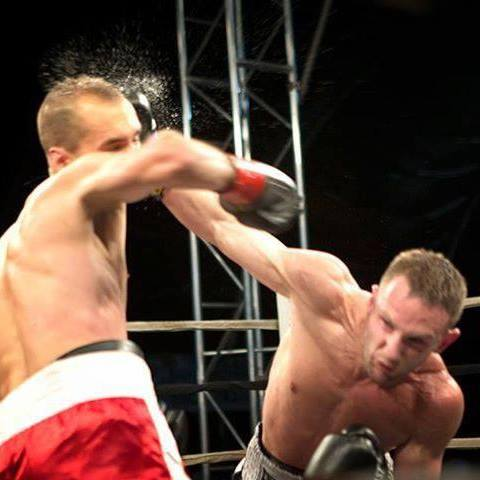
Noah Zuhdi lands a power punch on Gyula Vajda during Zuhdi's first defense of his WBU Lightweight Championship at the Lucky Star Casino in Concho, Oklahoma.

Zuhdi's first defense of his lightweight championship came against Gyula Vajda, a dangerous national champion from Hungary, on August 24, 2013. Taking place in front of a sold-out crowd at the Lucky Star Casino in Concho, Oklahoma, the hard-hitting affair was brief but explosive. Significant shots were landed by both fighters in the first round with Zuhdi scoring a knockdown over Vajda. In the second round, Zuhdi knocked Vajda down again with a devastating barrage started by an overhand right, this second knockdown putting Vajda down for good. In a post-fight interview, Zuhdi stated, "I knew I had to do something quick in the second because I could see his demeanor change after the first knockdown. It was a great win. I give my opponent a lot of credit—he hit hard, he stayed in there, and he fought to get up (after getting knocked down). I'm happy with the result, but I'm looking forward to what's next."

The second defense of Zuhdi's championship occurred at the OKC Downtown Airpark in Oklahoma City on June 6, 2014. He would face off with Eduardo Pereira Dos Reis, a crafty fighter with only one loss on his record at the time of the fight. While previous fights had shown Zuhdi gutting out a fight and using his power to secure victories, this fight relied on strategy and patience. With each passing round, Zuhdi would fare significantly better, leading to combinations, infighting, and eventually injuring Reis's ribs until he did not answer the bell and come out for the fifth round. After the bout, Zuhdi said, "I started out slow at first, but I was studying him. I felt I was significantly stronger and could break him down as the fight progressed[...] I was thrilled at the end, knowing that his will had been broken. I'm now 3-0 in title fights. I'm proving that I'm continually progressing against a level of competition that is increasingly higher."

=== Boxing retirement and recognition ===
Zuhdi would not lose his WBU Lightweight Championship in the ring and would walk away quietly from boxing to pursue various business ventures. His gloves from his first championship bout were collected and recorded by the Oklahoma History Center. His career accomplishments were featured in Bob Burke's Uniquely Oklahoma history book. His professional boxing record stands at 18-1, 1 NC (14 KOs).

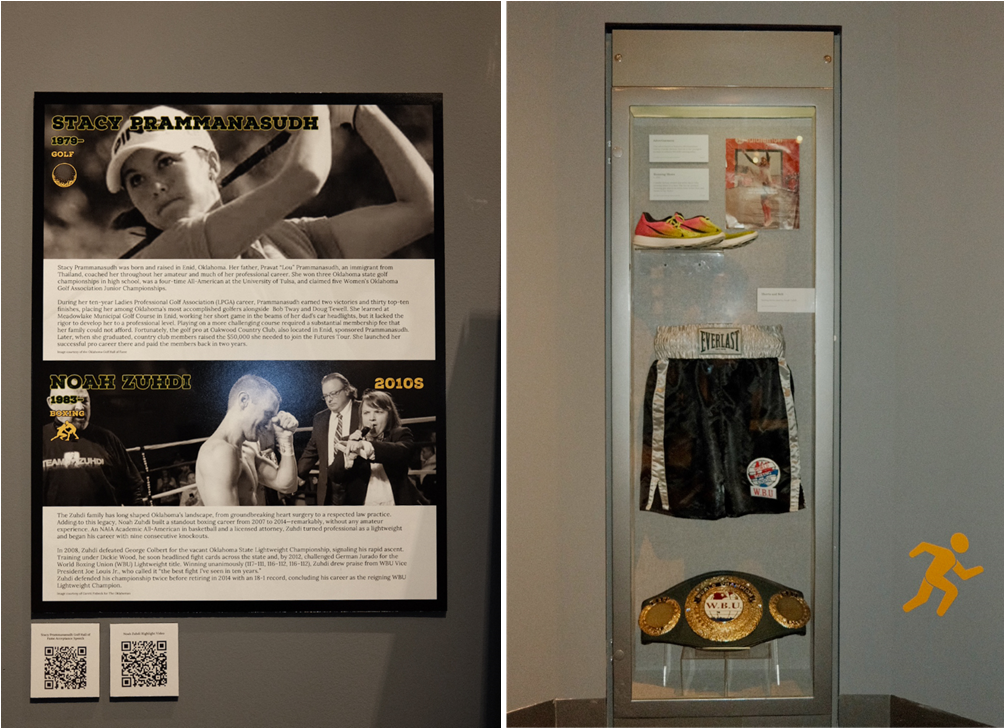
The Noah Zuhdi display items at the Oklahoma History Center's Oklahoma Sports Heroes exhibit.

Zuhdi's accomplishments and contributions to Oklahoma sports and boxing were further recognized in 2024 by the Oklahoma Historical Society and its Oklahoma History Center. He is featured in their Oklahoma Sports Heroes exhibit. His world championship belt, boxing trunks, and biography were put on display in an exhibit that the Oklahoma Historical Society proclaimed, "Highlights the achievements of Oklahoma athletes across various sports, linking them to the historical context and events during their careers[...] Visitors will recognize sports legends such as Jim Thorpe and Mickey Mantle alongside athletes from recent years, including Kaleo Kanahele Maclay and Noah Zuhdi. Guests can revisit beloved sports icons and discover new sports heroes."

== Entrepreneurship ==
In addition to attaining and owning various real estate holdings, Zuhdi joined Charles Dowlearn in 2017 as co-owners and founders of Oklahoma Foundation Solutions, LLC, a foundation repair company based in Oklahoma City. To the present day, the growing company has earned multiple service awards from Angi (formerly Angie's List) and Home Advisor.

== Professional boxing record ==
Noah Zuhdi's 20-bout professional boxing record to date:

20 fights	18 wins	1 loss
By knockout	14	0
Draws	0	
No contests	1	

No.	Result	Record	Opponent	Type	Round, time	Date	Location	Notes
20	Win	18-1 (1)	Eduardo Pereira Dos Reis	TKO, 3:00	4	June 6, 2014	OKC Downtown Airpark, Oklahoma City, Oklahoma, USA	Retained WBU Lightweight Championship
19	Win	17-1 (1)	Gyula Vajda	KO, 1:09	2	August 24, 2013	Lucky Star Casino, Concho, Oklahoma, USA	Retained WBU Lightweight Championship
18	Win	16-1 (1)	German Jurado	UD	12	September 20, 2012	Cox Convention Center, Oklahoma City, Oklahoma, USA	Won WBU Lightweight Championship
17	Win	15-1 (1)	Richard Flores	UD	6	September 2, 2011	Riverwind Casino, Norman, Oklahoma, USA	
16	No Contest	14-1 (1)	Terrance Roy	NC	1	April 23, 2011	WinStar Casino, Thackerville, Oklahoma, USA	Fight ruled no-contest after Roy tested positive for a banned substance
15	Win	14-1	Donny Miller	TKO, 1:26	1	March 19, 2011	Cox Convention Center, Oklahoma City, Oklahoma, USA	
14	Win	13-1	Ruben Calderon	UD	6	December 14, 2010	Cox Convention Center, Oklahoma City, Oklahoma, USA	
13	Win	12-1	Steven Cox	TKO, 1:29	3	November 20, 2010	WinStar Casino, Thackerville, Oklahoma, USA	
12	Win	11-1	Martin Armenta Chaparro	UD	6	August 13, 2010	Cox Convention Center, Oklahoma City, Oklahoma, USA	
11	Win	10-1	John Temple	KO, 2:55	3	May 21, 2010	Cox Convention Center, Oklahoma City, Oklahoma, USA	
10	Loss	9-1	Reymundo Hernandez	KO, 1:16	1	February 11, 2010	Remington Park, Oklahoma City, Oklahoma, USA	
9	Win	9-0	Robert Flaherty	KO, 1:49	2	November 12, 2009	Remington Park, Oklahoma City, Oklahoma, USA	
8	Win	8-0	Anthony McKay	TKO, 1:47	1	August 25, 2009	Remington Park, Oklahoma City, Oklahoma, USA	
7	Win	7-0	Jason McClure	TKO, 1:54	6	March 13, 2009	First Council Casino, Newkirk, Oklahoma, USA	
6	Win	6-0	Jason Jones	KO, 1:08	1	February 13, 2009	Remington Park, Oklahoma City, Oklahoma, USA	
5	Win	5-0	George Colbert	KO, 0:45	1	November 24, 2008	Remington Park, Oklahoma City, Oklahoma, USA	Won Oklahoma State Lightweight Championship
4	Win	4-0	Blaine Burks	TKO, 1:29	1	September 12, 2008	Comanche Nation Casino, Lawton, Oklahoma, USA	
3	Win	3-0	Chance Brown	TKO, 2:58	1	July 22, 2008	Remington Park, Oklahoma City, Oklahoma, USA	
2	Win	2-0	Isaiah Gibson	TKO, 1:55	1	April 1, 2008	Remington Park, Oklahoma City, Oklahoma, USA	
1	Win	1-0	Rafael Torres	TKO, 2:25	1	September 18, 2007	Remington Park, Oklahoma City, Oklahoma, USA	
