= People Incorporated =

American media and internet company

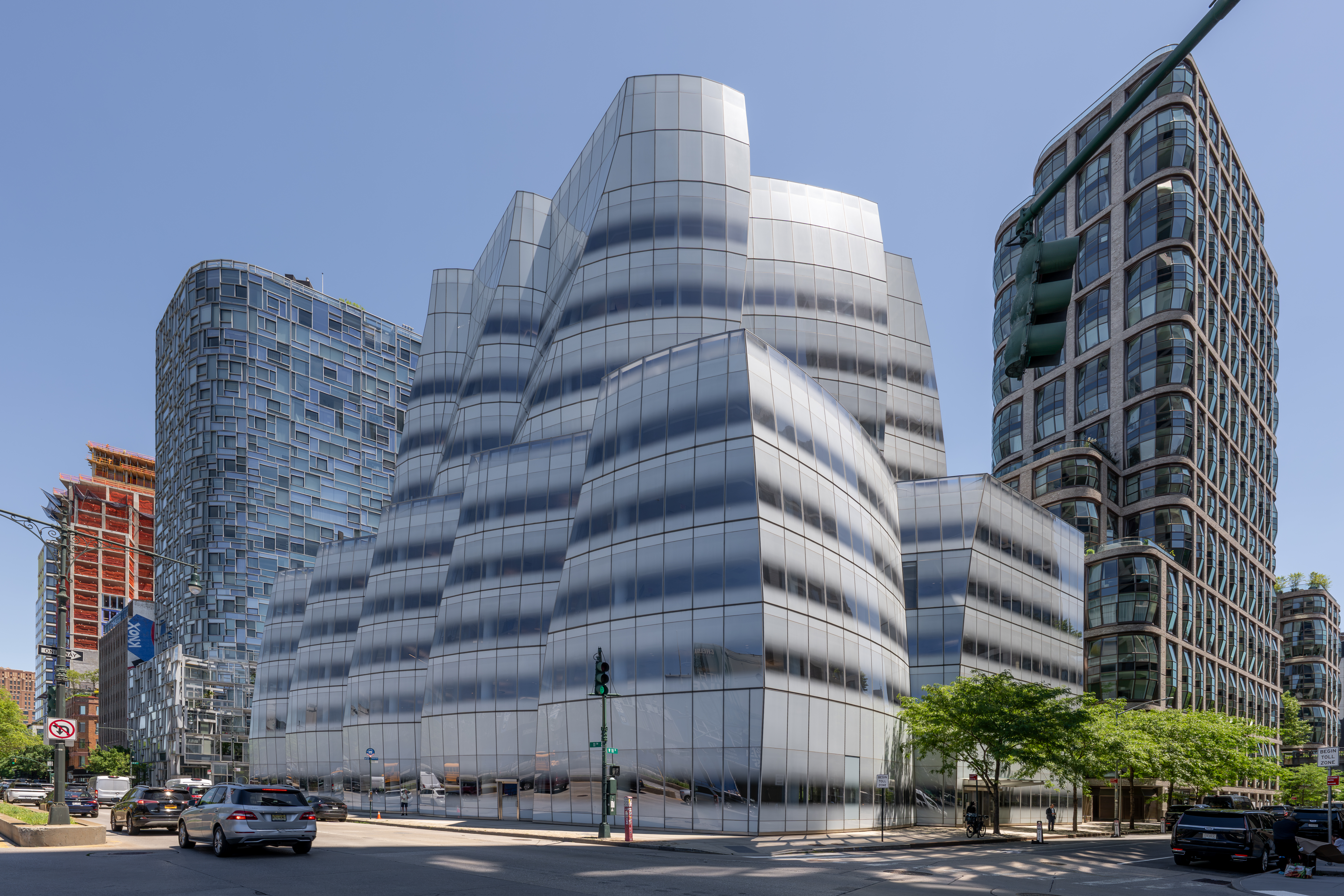
- IAC Building in New York City
- Formerly: Silver King Broadcasting Company, Inc.; HSN Inc. (1996–1998); USA Networks Inc. (1998–2002); USA Interactive (2002–2003); InterActiveCorp (2003–2004); IAC/InterActiveCorp (2004–2022); IAC Inc. (2022–2026)
- Type: Public
- Traded as: Nasdaq: PPLI; Russell 1000 component; S&P 600 component
- ISIN: US44891N2080
- Industry: Conglomerate
- Predecessors: Silver King Communications
- Founded: July 28, 1986; 40 years ago
- Headquarters: IAC Building, New York City, United States
- Area served: Worldwide
- Key people: Barry Diller (chairman); Neil Vogel (CEO)
- Products: Mass media; Casinos; Resorts; Car rental
- Revenue: ▼US$2.39 billion (2025)
- Operating income: ▼ −US$97 million (2025)
- Net income: ▲ −US$104 million (2025)
- Total assets: ▼US$7.13 billion (2025)
- Total equity: ▼US$4.73 billion (2025)
- Number of employees: 5,156 (2025)
- Subsidiaries: People Inc.; MGM Resorts International (26.1%); Turo Inc. (33%)
- Website: people-incorporated.com

People Incorporated is an American conglomerate that owns People Inc. and The Daily Beast. It is also a major shareholder of MGM Resorts International (26.1%) and Turo (31%).

The company was founded in 1986 as Silver King Broadcasting Company and in 1996 became HSN Inc., the holding company of Home Shopping Network. In 1998, the company acquired USA Network and changed its name to USA Networks, Inc. It sold its television assets to Vivendi in 2002 and changed its name to USA Interactive. The company changed its name to InterActiveCorp, and later to IAC/InterActiveCorp in 2004. In 2012, the company acquired About.com. IAC Inc. became its successor 10 years later. In June 2026, the company changed its name to People Incorporated and in August named Neil Vogel CEO.

The company is organized in Delaware with principal executive offices in New York City.

== History ==
Evolution of People Inc.
- 1922: Time Inc., the predecessor to the modern People Inc., was founded by Henry Luce and Briton Hadden, and it became the biggest magazine owner
- 1927: Time (Magazine), the namesake publication of Time Inc., began its annual Time Person of the Year
- 1930: Fortune was launched as Time's second magazine imprint to cover business journalism and economics
- 1936: Life, named after the older humor magazine, began publishing and popularized photojournalism
- 1941: In a famous editorial dubbed the American Century, Henry Luce envisioned U.S. foreign policy becoming more interventionist
- 1950s: Sports Illustrated launched as Time's dedicated sports magazine with a focus on vivid photography
- 1961: Time-Life was established as Time's marketing division, and it grew into a minor multimedia company
- 1968: Little, Brown and Company was acquired and incorporated into Time as its book publishing division
- 1972: Time acquired Home Box Office, Inc. from Charles Dolan and began managing the HBO pay-tv network
- 1974: People was launched to serve as the spiritual successor to Life, with a focus on celebrities and popular culture
- 1985: Southern Progress Corporation was acquired, and Time gained notable imprints like Southern Living and launched titles like Cooking Light
- 1989: Time Inc. became a subsidiary under Time Warner after merging with Warner Communications, and its book assets were soon consolidated
- 1992: Time Warner Cable was established as the consolidated cable division of Time Warner, and until 2016, it was the second-largest cable operator
- 1997: AskJeeves launched online and became a major search engine; after the dot-com bubble, it declined and was bought out by IAC
- 1999: Pathfinder, a digital hub for Time imprints, was shut down due to unprofitability, and Time Warner later pursued a merger with AOL
- 2006: The Lagardère Group acquired the Time Warner Book Group and renamed it Hachette Book Group
- 2014: Time Inc. was spun off as a separate, public company from Time Warner due to the decline of print media
- 2018: After being acquired by Meredith, Time Inc. was dissolved, and non-core magazine titles were placed for sale
- 2021: Dotdash merged with Meredith, and the merged company became a subsidiary of IAC as Dotdash Meredith
- 2025: IAC and Dotdash Meredith adopted the branding of People (magazine) to simplify corporate identity, with their new logos paying tribute to Time Inc.

=== 1980s and 1990s ===
The company was incorporated on July 28, 1986 as Silver King Broadcasting Company, Inc., a subsidiary of Home Shopping Network.

By 1988, Silver King had bought 11 stations for about $220 million. The company was later renamed as HSN Communications, Inc., and then Silver King Communications, Inc.

In 1992, HSN completed the corporate spin-off of Silver King to its shareholders.

In August 1995, Barry Diller acquired control of Silver King in a deal backed by the company's largest shareholder, Liberty Media. Diller, who had led the creation of Fox Broadcasting Company, reportedly hoped to use Silver King's stations as the foundation for a new broadcast network.

In December 1996, Silver King acquired an 80% stake in HSN for $1.3 billion in stock, and Silver King was renamed HSN, Inc. At the same time, the company acquired Savoy Pictures, a failed film studio that owned four Fox affiliate stations through SF Broadcasting, for $210 million in stock.

HSN purchased a controlling stake in Ticketmaster in July 1997, and acquired the rest of the company in June 1998.

In November 1997, the company launched the Spanish Shopping Network in partnership with Univision.

In February 1998, it acquired the television assets of Universal Pictures (including USA Network, Sci-Fi Channel, and Universal Television's domestic production and distribution arms) for $4.1 billion. In January 1998, the company's name was changed to USA Networks, Inc.

The company acquired the Hotel Reservations Network in May 1999 for $149 million.

USA Networks merged the online division of Ticketmaster with Citysearch in September 1998, establishing a new public company, Ticketmaster Online–CitySearch (TMCS). USA Networks sold Ticketmaster to TMCS in 2001, retaining a 61% share in the combined company, which became known as simply Ticketmaster. USA Networks reacquired full ownership of Ticketmaster in 2003.

=== 2000s ===
In May 2001, Univision Communications acquired USA Broadcasting, a division of USA Networks including 13 local stations. The next year, Vivendi bought the rest of USA's television entertainment businesses, including the USA Network and Sci-Fi Channel. This led to the creation of a new company named Vivendi Universal Entertainment, led by Diller.

In July 2001, the company entered the online travel business with its acquisition of Expedia, followed the next year by the acquisition of Interval International.

In May 2002, following the shift in focus to online assets, the company changed its name to USA Interactive (USAI). It was renamed InterActiveCorp in June 2003. It was renamed IAC/InterActiveCorp in July 2004.

In August 2003, IAC acquired LendingTree for $734 million in stock. In September 2003, the company acquired Hotwire.com for $685 million.

In October 2003, IAC agreed to buy French travel site Anyway.com from Transat A.T. for $62.7 million. In March 2004, the company acquired Tripadvisor for $212 million. In August 2004, the company acquired ServiceMagic. In March 2005, it acquired Ask Jeeves for $1.85 billion in stock. Also in March 2005, it launched Gifts.com.

In August 2005, the company bundled together its travel-related sites and spun them off as a new public company, Expedia, Inc.

In January 2006, the company acquired ShoeBuy.com for an undisclosed sum, which the company sold to Jet for $70 million in January 2017.

In August 2006, the company acquired a controlling stake in Connected Ventures, owner of CollegeHumor and Vimeo, for $21 million.

In September 2007, IAC acquired a majority stake in GarageGames.

In May 2008, IAC and Ask.com acquired Lexico, the owner of Dictionary.com, Thesaurus.com, and Reference.com, for approximately $100 million in cash.

In August 2008, IAC spun off several of its businesses, including: Tree.com (formerly LendingTree), the Home Shopping Network, Ticketmaster, and Interval International.

In April 2009, IAC acquired Urbanspoon. It acquired People Media for $80 million in July 2009. Also in July 2009, the company launched Notional, a production company.

=== 2010s ===
In February 2010, IAC's Match.com acquired Singlesnet, an online dating site.

In May 2010, the company acquired DailyBurn, a fitness site. The company sold a majority interest in DailyBurn to founder Andy Smith in July 2022.

In December 2010, following a protracted dispute over the 2008 spinoffs, Liberty traded its IAC stock for $220 million in cash, plus ownership of Evite and Gifts.com. On the same day, Diller stepped down as CEO but remained chairman, and Match.com CEO Greg Blatt was appointed to succeed him.

In 2012, IAC acquired People Inc., (then called About.com). In 2017, IAC renamed it Dotdash.

In January 2013, IAC acquired Tutor.com for a reported price of just under $40 million.

In August 2013, IAC sold Newsweek to the International Business Times on undisclosed terms.

In December 2013, IAC fired Justine Sacco, director of corporate communications, after she posted an AIDS joke regarding her upcoming trip to Africa to Twitter, which went viral. The incident became a byword for the need for people to be cautious about what they post on social media.

In June 2014, the company acquired HowAboutWe. In August 2014, IAC acquired ASKfm for an undisclosed sum.

IAC sold Urbanspoon to Zomato in January 2015 for around $50 million.

In November 2015, IAC completed the initial public offering of Match Group.

In May 2017, HomeAdvisor combined with Angie's List, forming ANGI Homeservices Inc. The company became a public company in October 2017. In October 2018, ANGI acquired Handy.

In January 2019, IAC sold Citysearch parent CityGrid to eLocal.

In July 2019, IAC invested $250 million in Turo.

In August 2019, the company acquired NurseFly for $15 million.

=== 2020s ===
In January 2020, IAC withdrew its financial backing for CollegeHumor and its sister websites and sold the websites to Chief Creative Officer Sam Reich; IAC remains a minority owner of Reich's rebranded company Dropout. As a result of the restructuring, more than 100 employees of CollegeHumor were laid off.

In February 2020, IAC acquired Care.com for an enterprise value of $500 million.

In July 2020, Match Group was separated from the remaining businesses of IAC, including the corporate spin-off of the company.

In August 2020, IAC acquired a 12% stake in MGM Resorts International for approximately $1 billion. In February 2022, it paid $202.5 million to increase its share to 14.4%. It increased the stake to 16.5% in August 2022.

In May 2021, IAC completed the spin-off of Vimeo, the 11th company to be spun-off from IAC.

In December 2021, IAC acquired Meredith Corporation's National Media Group for $2.7 billion. Meredith (and the former Time Inc.) was merged with IAC subsidiary Dotdash, forming a new entity called Dotdash Meredith.

In August 2022, IAC changed its legal entity (IAC/InterActiveCorp) to IAC Inc. In October, IAC agreed to sell its workforce-as-a-service platform Bluecrew to EmployBridge with IAC remaining a minority shareholder in Bluecrew's business.

In March 2026, IAC sold Care.com to an affiliate of Pacific Avenue Capital Partners for $320 million.

In June 2026, IAC was renamed People Incorporated. Neil Vogel, who has been CEO of the People business segment, became CEO of the entire company.

Also in June 2026, the company offered to acquire the remaining shares of MGM Resorts International that it did not already own. In September, the company announced that it had rescinded the offer.

== Brands ==
=== People Inc. ===
- Allrecipes
- Better Homes & Gardens
- The Balance
- Brides
- Byrdie
- EatingWell
- Entertainment Weekly
- Food & Wine
- Health
- InStyle
- Investopedia
- Life
- Lifewire
- Liquor.com
- Martha Stewart
- Parents
- People
- People en Español
- Real Simple
- Serious Eats
- Shape
- Simply Recipes
- Southern Living
- The Spruce
- Travel + Leisure
- TreeHugger
- TripSavvy
- Verywell

=== Emerging & Other ===
- Vivian Health
- The Daily Beast
- IAC Films
