= Oesterle =

Oesterle is a surname. Notable people with the surname include:

- Bill Oesterle (1965–2023), American venture capitalist
- Heather Oesterle (born 1979), American basketball player and coach
- Joseph Oesterlé (born 1954), French mathematician
- Jordan Oesterle (born 1992), American ice hockey player
- Jutta Oesterle-Schwerin (born 1941), German politician
- Michael Oesterle (born 1968), German-born Canadian composer
- Nathalie Colin-Oesterlé (born 1965), French lawyer and politician
