= Mystery Tackle Box =

- Type: Private
- Industry: Outdoor sports, e-commerce
- Founded: Chicago, Illinois (2012)
- Founder: Ross Gordon
- Headquarters: Chicago
- Area served: USA and Canada
- Parent: Catch Co.
- Website: mysterytacklebox.com

Mystery Tackle Box is a monthly fishing gear subscription service founded in 2012 and based in Chicago, Illinois. Users subscribe to the service on a monthly or other basis, in which they select the fishing supplies which they receive in a “mystery box”.

== History ==
Mystery Tackle Box, Inc. was founded by Ross Gordon in July 2012. Gordon, an avid fisherman who grew up in Minnesota, had previously started other companies, including fishing lure manufacturing company BioSpawn Lure Company, and CraftJack, a software company for home improvement contractors that was acquired by HomeAdvisor in 2012. In 2016, Mystery Tackle Box was rebranded as The Catch Co.; the subscription service continued to be called Mystery Tackle Box. In June 2018, the company launched Karl’s Bait & Tackle, an e-commerce site including Mystery Tackle Box, as well as clothing and related products.

== Operation ==
Mystery Tackle Box uses data collection relevant to anglers to match products to anglers, Anglers have the option of purchasing hundreds of new lures every season. Mystery Tackle Box allows customers to select the type of fish species they want to attract and then be guided to equipment choices. Orders come in boxes designed for different fish, and are delivered on a monthly basis.
