= Wide Angle Software =

Software company

- Company type: Private
- Industry: Computer software
- Founded: 2006
- Headquarters: Stafford, England
- Area served: Worldwide
- Products: TouchCopy; Droid Transfer; iBackup Extractor; Tune Sweeper
- Website: wideanglesoftware.com

Wide Angle Software is a United Kingdom-based software development company, headquartered in Stafford, England. The company was founded in 2006.

Wide Angle Software is known for producing media and file management software and applications including software for PC, Mac, iOS and Android. The company develops software for backup and management of digital media on portable media devices such as iPods, iPhones, iPads, as well as Android devices. In particular, Wide Angle Software's TouchCopy, and iBackup Extractor for backup and retrieval of lost or deleted iPhone music, and messages have been highly rated and reviewed by multiple technology industry magazine and websites, including PCWorld, Lifewire and CNET. Their Android device backup and transfer solution, Droid Transfer, has been reviewed by PocketLint and Android Guys.Another Mac and Windows App developed by Wide Angle Software is Tune Sweeper, which enables users to clean their iTunes libraries of duplicate and missing music. Tune Sweeper was featured in Macworld and MacUpdate.

== See also ==
- Apple
- Symantec
