= AdKeeper =

Online advertising platform

AdKeeper, Inc.
- Company type: Private
- Founded: March 2010
- Headquarters: New York City, New York, USA
- Founders: Scott Kurnit; Steve Nieker; Todd Sloan; MaryAnn Bekkedahl; Bruce Winterton; Scott Germaise
- Industry: Advertising, Online advertising
- Website: adkeeper.net
- Registration: Optional
- Current status: Offline

AdKeeper was an online advertising platform that allowed consumers to keep online ads for future use. A button was inserted into advertising creative elements, and was visible to users as a small button in the ad with the letter “k” inside the button. Consumers could click on the k button to keep the ads, and then return to the cloud-based Adkeeper at a future time, to review the ads they had kept. The users could also share ads with others, via email or social networks.

== Features ==
AdKeeper provided users with a personal "Keeper", where they could come to view ads they've collected from various places on the Internet, or the Ad Gallery display area in AdKeeper. Ads that are kept display the date they were kept, when they expire, a short description, and also allow for users to rate them, when they are logged in. Common social sharing tools, such as Email, Twitter, and Facebook are available, and in the aforementioned gallery, users can keep more ads from participating advertisers.

== History ==
AdKeeper was founded in March, 2010, by Scott Kurnit, who serves as chairman and CEO. Kurnit is best known as the founder of About.com, which grew to a public market value of $1.7 billion, and was sold to Primedia for $724 million, in 2001. About is now owned by IAC.

AdKeeper operated in stealth until October, 2010, when it launched in private beta. The AdKeeper service became generally available to consumers on February 14, 2011.

== Clients ==
AdKeeper began its service with a list of advertisers who used AdKeeper in their online ads, including Air Alaska, Allstate, Ally Bank, AT&T, Best Buy, CBS, Ford, Gap, General Mills, InterContinental Hotels Group, JetBlue, Kia Motors, Kmart, Kraft Foods, Macy’s, McDonald’s, Nextag, Pepsi, Sara Lee, Sears, Showtime, The Advertising Council, The Home Depot, Unilever and Warner Bros.

== Finances and governance ==
In March, 2010, the company raised $8 million in funding from DCM, True Ventures, Spark Capital, First Round Capital, Betaworks, The New York Times, Lerer Ventures and several individual investors. In December, 2010, the company raised $35 million from Oak Investment Partners, DCM, and other previous investors.

AdKeeper’s Board of Directors consists of Scott Kurnit, Fred Harman (Managing Partner of Oak Investment Partners), Dixon Doll (Co-Founder and General Partner, DCM), Jon Callaghan (Founder, True Ventures) and Ron Unterman (scientist and former Managing Director, Slater Technology Fund).
