= Southern Progress Corporation =

American publishing company

- Type: Subsidiary
- Industry: Periodicals
- Founded: 1886
- Headquarters: Birmingham, Alabama, USA
- Key people: Bill McDougald, Vice-President, Southern Progress Homes Group
- Products: Magazines, Books, and Websites
- Revenue: ▲$1.00 billion USD (2008)
- Number of employees: 1,100 (2007)
- Parent: People Inc.

Southern Progress Corporation, based in Birmingham, Alabama, is a publisher of lifestyle magazines and books owned by People Inc.

The company publishes such magazines as Southern Living, Cooking Light, Health and Coastal Living.

== History ==
The origins of Southern Progress trace to 1886, with the Progressive Farmer, a weekly newsletter, founded by Civil War veteran Leonidas LaFayette Polk in North Carolina in 1886. The newsletter was intended to bring the latest information on crop and livestock production to the newly united nation's agrarian economy in the Southeast. After Polk died suddenly in 1892, Clarence H. Poe from Raleigh, NC took over as editor (in 1899), and in 1903, he and 3 partners purchased the publication, taking it from a newspaper to a magazine with 36,000 subscribers. Together they organized the Agricultural Publishing Company, the name of which was later changed to the Progressive Farmer Company. One of the most notable achievements of the Progressive Farmer magazine was its continual crusade and endorsement during the early twentieth century of the land grant college subsidies provided to Agricultural and Mechanical colleges across the United States.

The magazine broadened its reach beyond the Southeast by merging its Raleigh, North Carolina operation with the Southern Farm Gazette newspaper published in Starkville, Mississippi. This was a major innovation in publishing at the time. Merging these two farm publications established the first publication in history to publish regional editorial specific to its circulation areas. This merger of the Progressive Farmer and the Southern Farm Gazette resulted in the need to have a production and printing facility that would be a one-day train trip to the editorial offices in Starkville, Mississippi and corporate office in Raleigh, North Carolina for receiving the typewritten feature stories for publication. It was decided in 1911 to establish a central printing facility at 1702 4th Ave. North in Birmingham, Alabama, while the company President, Clarence Poe and his partners remained in Raleigh, NC and directed company operations from there.

The Progressive Farmer Company continued to publish across the Southeastern and Mid-South regions soon expanding successfully into Texas and the Southwest. Serving farm information needs, publishing through two world wars, crusading for important rural farm issues such as rural electrification, soil conservation, rural education and modern agricultural technology, the magazine soared to a circulation high of 1.3 million by the 1960s.

In 1966, the management, led by Emory Cunningham and the editors of Progressive Farmer launched Southern Living magazine fashioned after the lifestyle and home life section in the Progressive Farmer. The Progressive Farmer had extended its appeal among suburban housewives, and that segment of its circulation received the new magazine, Southern Living to establish its distribution and advertising rate base. From the pages of Progressive Farmer rose the largest and most successful regional publication in history. Consequently, Progressive Farmer was able to editorially focus more completely on production agriculture and concentrate circulation efforts to the rural farm household. The launch of Southern Living was an outstanding strategic move for the Progressive Farmer Company.

In 1980, the Progressive Farmer Company changed its name to Southern Progress Corporation in an effort to reflect its wider focus. By this time, Southern Living had a subscription rate of two million and was among the top 15 U.S. magazines in monthly advertising revenue

In the late 1980s until the early 1990s, Southern Progress began looking for a new corporate headquarters in the Birmingham area. They decided on a property located down the road from their then current headquarters. The new facility is next to Samford University and in front of the HealthSouth Lakeshore Rehabilitation Hospital. Southern Progress had an over 400,000 square foot corporate campus at Lakeshore. The campus has been named one of the most beautiful corporate campuses in the world. The campus also served as an office for Time, the parent company, Time Inc. In 2014, the campus was sold to Samford University and incorporated into its adjoining campus. One of the three buildings continues to be leased to Southern Progress for its operations. Three buildings were erected between 1985 and 2005. The third building was designed by Axios and won the AIA Excellence Award from the Georgia Chapter of the American Institute of Architects.

In 1985, Southern Progress Corporation was purchased by Time Inc. for $498 million, the most ever paid for a publishing company at the time. Its publications later operated as a unit of Time Inc.'s Lifestyle Group.

In 2006, the company sold its Progressive Farmer magazine to DTN, now (Telvent DTN).

During the 2008 financial crisis, the magazines Cottage Living and Southern Accents were shut.

At the end of 2012, its magazines had a combined readership of about eight million. The company employed more than 700 people at headquarters in Birmingham, Alabama at the time.

In 2025, Dotdash Meridith, the parent company of Southern Living magazine, changed its name to People, Inc.

== Publications ==
=== Current Magazines ===
- Southern Living
- Cooking Light
- Coastal Living
- Health

=== Former Magazines ===
- Progressive Farmer
- Leisure Arts
- Southern Accents
- Cottage Living
- Sunset (sold to Regent, L.P.)
- Southern Living atHome

=== Other publications ===
- Oxmoor House
  - Sunset Books

== See also ==
- List of United States magazines
- List of magazines by circulation
