= BernieSez =

- Company type: Private
- Available in: English
- Founded: 2013
- Headquarters: Raleigh, North Carolina, United States
- Area served: Worldwide
- Key people: Terence McEnally and James Young
- Current status: Active

BernieSez was a free-to-use service created by attorney Terence McEnally, and James Young and launched in November 2013. BernieSez.com allowed persons in need of legal services to briefly describe a legal matter, and have attorneys contact them directly. Attorneys were verified and subjected to a review before being allowed to participate. Participating lawyers were not able to see fee quotes made by other lawyers.

== History ==
BernieSez was co-owned by Terence McEnally and James Young, through the company Legal Software Solutions. The company initiated a soft launch of BernieSez in November 2013.

== Model ==
BernieSez emulated the model of other SaaS eBusinesses such as uShip, AngiesList, and HomeAdvisor, in order to aggregate service-provider choices for the consumer and place onus upon the service provider to initiate first-contact.
