= Orion Metal Exchange =

American precious metals exchange

- Industry: Precious metal
- Founder: Jacob Blalock
- Headquarters: Los Angeles, California, United States
- Website: orionmetalexchange.com

Orion Metal Exchange is an American precious metals exchange based in Los Angeles, California. Jacob Blalock is the current chief executive officer of the company.

== History ==
Orion Metal Exchange was founded in 2017.

== Operations ==
Orion provides services in precious metals such as gold, silver, platinum, and palladium along with storage vaults service for safe storage of precious metals such as residential safe storage and off-site depository. It also provides precious metals IRAs such as Gold and Silver individual retirement accounts (IRAs) as an alternative to volatile stocks for retiring individuals.

== Reception ==
Orion Metal Exchange has been reviewed by Investopedia and Money.
