= Oxmoor House =

Publishing division of Southern Progress Corporation

- Parent company: Southern Progress Corporation
- Status: Defunct
- Founded: 1979
- Defunct: 2018
- Country of origin: United States
- Headquarters location: Birmingham, Alabama
- Distribution: Hachette Book Group USA
- Publication types: Books
- Imprints: Sunset Books
- Official website: www.oxmoorhouse.com

Oxmoor House was the book publishing division of Southern Progress Corporation, which was based in Birmingham, Alabama. Oxmoor House was founded in 1979 when it began publishing Southern Living's Southern Living Annual Recipes. It published books relating to cooking, crafts, holidays, home improvement, and gardening. The company also operated the Sunset Books division for Southern Progress's Sunset magazine. The company maintaind its offices at Southern Progress's Corporate Campus in Birmingham. Meredith Corporation acquired Southern Progress and closed Oxmoor House in 2018.
