= Angi Inc. =

US-based website containing crowd-sourced reviews of local businesses

- Formerly: ANGI Homeservices Inc.
- Type: Public
- Traded as: Nasdaq: ANGI (Class A)
- Industry: Internet Content & Information
- Founded: 1995; 31 years ago
- Founder: William S. Oesterle; Angie Hicks
- Headquarters: Denver, Colorado, United States
- Key people: Jeff Kip (CEO)
- Services: Online marketplace; Review site
- Revenue: ▲US$1.031 billion (2025)
- Operating income: ▲US$65.406 million (2025)
- Net income: ▲US$ 43.832 million (2025)
- Owner: People Incorporated (3%)
- Number of employees: 2,300
- Subsidiaries: Angi; HomeAdvisor
- Website: www.angi.com

Angi Inc. (formerly ANGI Homeservices Inc.) is an internet services company formed in 2017 by the merger of Angie's List and HomeAdvisor. The company has its earliest roots in American home services website Angie's List, founded in 1995 as an online directory that allows users to read and publish crowd-sourced reviews of local businesses and contractors.

For the quarter ending on June 30, 2018, ANGI reported total revenue of US$1,132,000,000 and a net income of US$77,507,000. On May 1, 2017, The Wall Street Journal reported that IAC planned to buy Angie's List. By September 2017 the new publicly traded company was called ANGI Homeservices Inc. Shares started trading in early October, 2017.

In March 2019, Angi moved its corporate headquarters to Denver, Colorado.

== History ==
William S. Oesterle and Angie Hicks founded Angie's List in 1995. The idea resulted from Hicks's search for a reliable construction contractor in suburban Columbus, Ohio, on behalf of Oesterle, a venture capitalist who was Hicks's boss. Hicks moved to Columbus to join Oesterle in creating Columbus Neighbors, a call-in service, and publication with reviews of local home and lawn care services. The name and concept were based on Unified Neighbors in Indianapolis, Indiana. Hicks went door-to-door, signing up consumers as members and collecting ratings of local contractors. After Hicks recruited over 1,000 members in Columbus within one year, she turned to Oesterle to raise money from investors to develop the business.

In 2013, Angie's List investors worried that the company had been in business for more than 18 years, yet never had shown an annual profit and that valuations of the company were unrealistic based on the actual revenue the company produces. But by 2015 growth estimates indicate a significant earnings-per-share growth, with a long-term growth rate at 19%. Combine this with stock estimates rising in 2015 by 13.3%, some Securities research firms such as Zacks Investment Research indicated ANGI is well-positioned for future earnings growth.

=== HomeAdvisor ===
In 1998, ServiceMagic was founded by Rodney Rice and Michael Beaudoin who were part of the founding management team of Einstein Bros Bagels. In 2004, IAC acquired the website for an undisclosed price.

On July 22, 2004, IAC acquired ServiceMagic. In October 2008, ServiceMagic acquired the French business 123Devis.com and Travaux.com, as well as UK business 123GetAQuote.co.uk to create ServiceMagic Europe. In March 2009, the UK business was rebranded as ServiceMagic.co.uk.

In 2012, the firm changed its name to HomeAdvisor.

In 2013, HomeAdvisor acquired Werkspot.nl, the leading Dutch home improvement platform. In 2014, Werkspot.nl opens her twin company in Italy: Instapro.

By 2015, the firm had achieved more than $300 million in annual revenue, been used by more than 30 million homeowners, had nearly 100,000 pre-screened service professionals in its network and almost 3 million verified reviews.

In 2016, HomeAdvisor acquired the German home services company, MyHammer. In 2017, it acquired Canada's leading home services platform, HomeStars, and MyBuilder, the UK's leading home services platform connecting homeowners and tradesmen.

=== Angi ===
In 1996, the company bought Unified Neighbors from its creator and moved the company's headquarters to Indianapolis.

In 2010, Angie's List raised a total of $25 million in capital from investors. In September 2010, Wasatch Funds and Battery Ventures invested $22 million. In November 2010, Saints Capital led an additional funding of $2.5 million. On November 17, 2011, the firm began trading on the NASDAQ exchange under the ticker symbol ANGI. It priced 8.8M shares at $13 and opened for trading at $18, a 33% premium.

In July 2016, Angie's List was made a freemium service; the basic membership tier, with access to more than 10 million reviews, was made free, alongside subscription tiers offering additional functionality.

On October 2, 2017, IAC announced that it had agreed to acquire Angie's List for $781.4 million. and it merged Angie's List and HomeAdvisor, renaming the merged company to ANGI Homeservices, retaining Angie's List ticker symbol and stock history.

In October 2018, ANGI Homeservices bought Handy for $165.5 million. In March 2021, Angie's List changed its name to Angi, and ANGI Homeservices Inc. changed its name to Angi Inc.

In May 2023, William Oesterle, who co-founded the company with Angie Hicks, died.

== Lawsuits ==
In 2014, Angie's List Inc. paid $2.8 million to settle a lawsuit alleging that it automatically renewed members at a higher rate than they were led to believe.

In August 2016, HomeAdvisor has agreed to settle three lawsuits for a payment of $1,400,000. The class action lawsuits focused on HomeAdvisor acceptance of advertising payments from service providers, and whether those payments affect service providers’ letter-grade ratings, reviews, and place in search-result rankings. HomeAdvisor denies plaintiffs’ claims, but disclosed that revenue from service providers can affect the order of search-result rankings of the service provider under certain settings (Moore vs. AngiesList).
