= Maya Feller =

Maya Feller, RDN
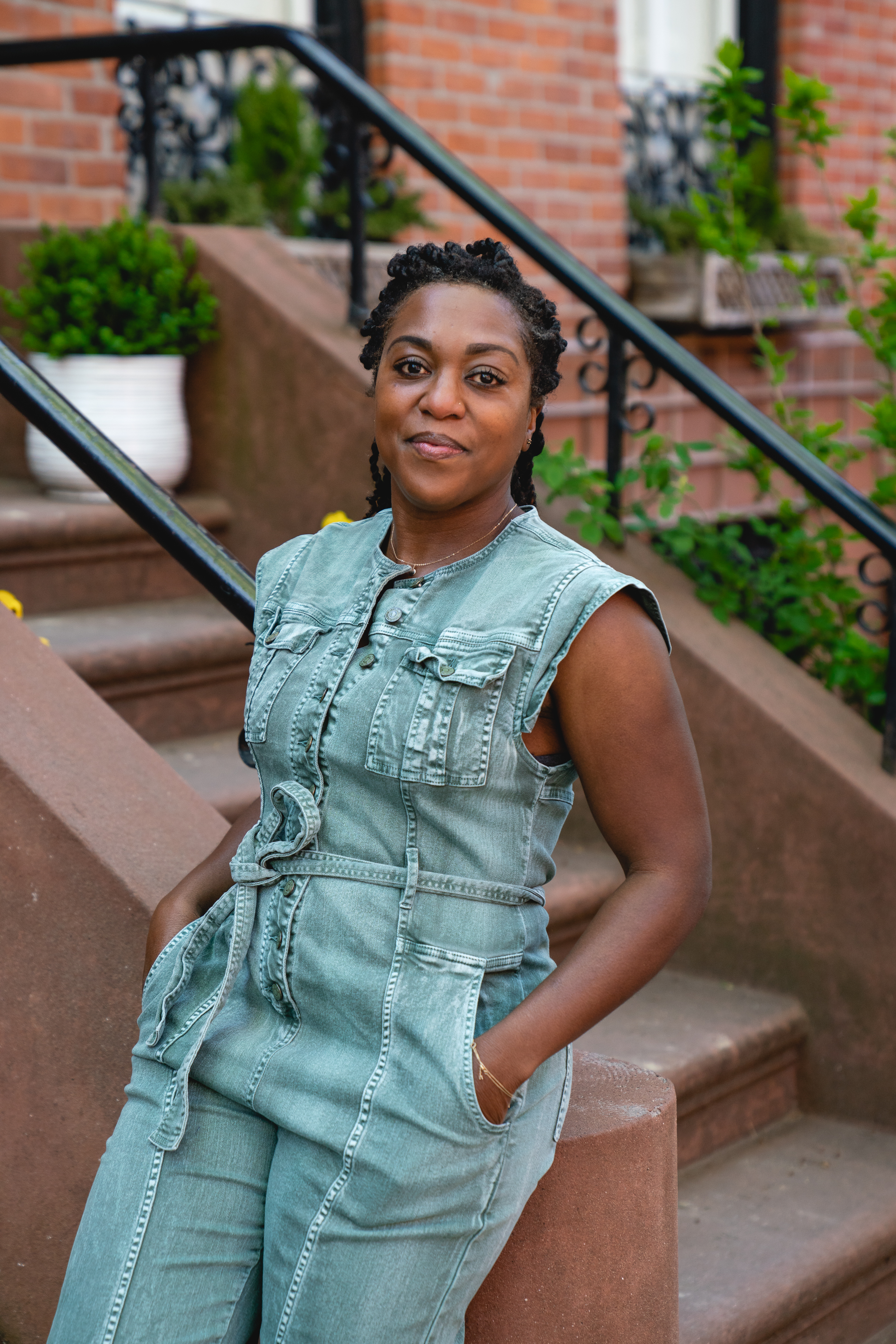
- Born: Boston, Massachusetts
- Education: New York University
- Occupations: Registered Dietitian Nutritionist, Author, and Media Contributor
- Years active: 2014–
- Known for: American Nutrition Expert
- Notable work: The Southern Comfort Food Diabetes Cookbook (2019) Eating from Our Roots (2023)
- Website: https://mayafellernutrition.com/

Maya Feller is an American Registered Dietitian Nutritionist (RDN), author, and media contributor known for her work promoting culturally inclusive, evidence-based nutrition. She is the founder of Maya Feller Nutrition, a private practice based in Brooklyn, New York. Feller is the author of The Southern Comfort Food Diabetes Cookbook and Eating from Our Roots. She is a frequent guest on Good Morning America and has been featured in prominent publications including Forbes, EBONY, BBC, Martha Stewart, Today.com, and The Kitchn.

== Career ==
Feller holds a Master of Science in Clinical Nutrition from New York University. She is a licensed registered dietitian and certified dietitian nutritionist who provides Medical nutrition therapy and nutrition coaching through her practice, Maya Feller Nutrition.

Her work focuses on inclusive wellness, food equity, and culturally respectful nutrition care. She has been a featured speaker at major events, including the Aspen Ideas Festival, where she discussed nutrition inequities and the importance of cultural relevance in nutrition. She also frequently appears on television programs such as Good Morning America, providing expert advice on nutrition and wellness.

Feller has been interviewed by various national outlets, including MSNBC where she discussed the importance of culturally relevant foods. Her work has also been highlighted by PIX11, Simply Recipes, and The Kitchn.

== Books ==
- The Southern Comfort Food Diabetes Cookbook (2019)
- Eating from Our Roots (2023)

Her 2023 cookbook Eating from Our Roots was positively reviewed in national outlets. Forbes called it a celebration of global cuisines and a practical guide to creating balanced meals from diverse food traditions. Simply Recipes included it among the best cookbooks of Spring 2023, and The Kitchn featured several of its recipes.

== Recognition ==
Feller was featured in a 2024 interview with the NYC Food Policy Center, where she discussed the importance of addressing nutrition inequities and the cultural context of food access. She has also been recognized by the National Kidney Foundation for her work in inclusive wellness and nutrition.
