= Digitalbook =

Free audiobook and ebook discovery platform

- Website type: Audiobook and e-book discovery
- Available in: Multilingual
- Owner: Digitalbook Ltd
- Industry: Digital publishing
- Website: www.digitalbook.io
- Commercial: Yes (free to use)
- Registration: Optional

Digitalbook is a free audiobook and e-book discovery platform operated by Digitalbook Ltd. It provides access to public domain titles from sources including LibriVox, Project Gutenberg and the Internet Archive, and lets users search across Amazon, Apple Books and Google Books for additional titles.

== Overview ==
Digitalbook offers streaming and offline listening and reading without a subscription or membership. Content can be accessed through its website and through mobile applications for iOS and Android. The service functions as a discovery layer over existing public-domain libraries rather than as a content publisher, aggregating free audiobooks and ebooks into a single searchable interface.

== Features ==
The platform organises titles into browsable collections such as popular, trending, genre and language, and allows users to download audiobook chapters or whole ebooks for offline use. It provides preview playback for audiobooks and an in-browser reader for ebooks, and lets users maintain a personal shelf of favourites. Search results also surface titles from Amazon Books, Apple Books and Google Books.

== History ==
Digitalbook's mobile applications were released for iOS on the Apple App Store and for Android on Google Play, with the Android release listed from October 2023.

== Reception ==
Digitalbook has been included in roundups of free audiobook and ebook sources by Reader's Digest and Lifewire. On the consumer-review platform Trustpilot, the service holds a user rating based on customer reviews.
