= Caleb Silver =

American journalist

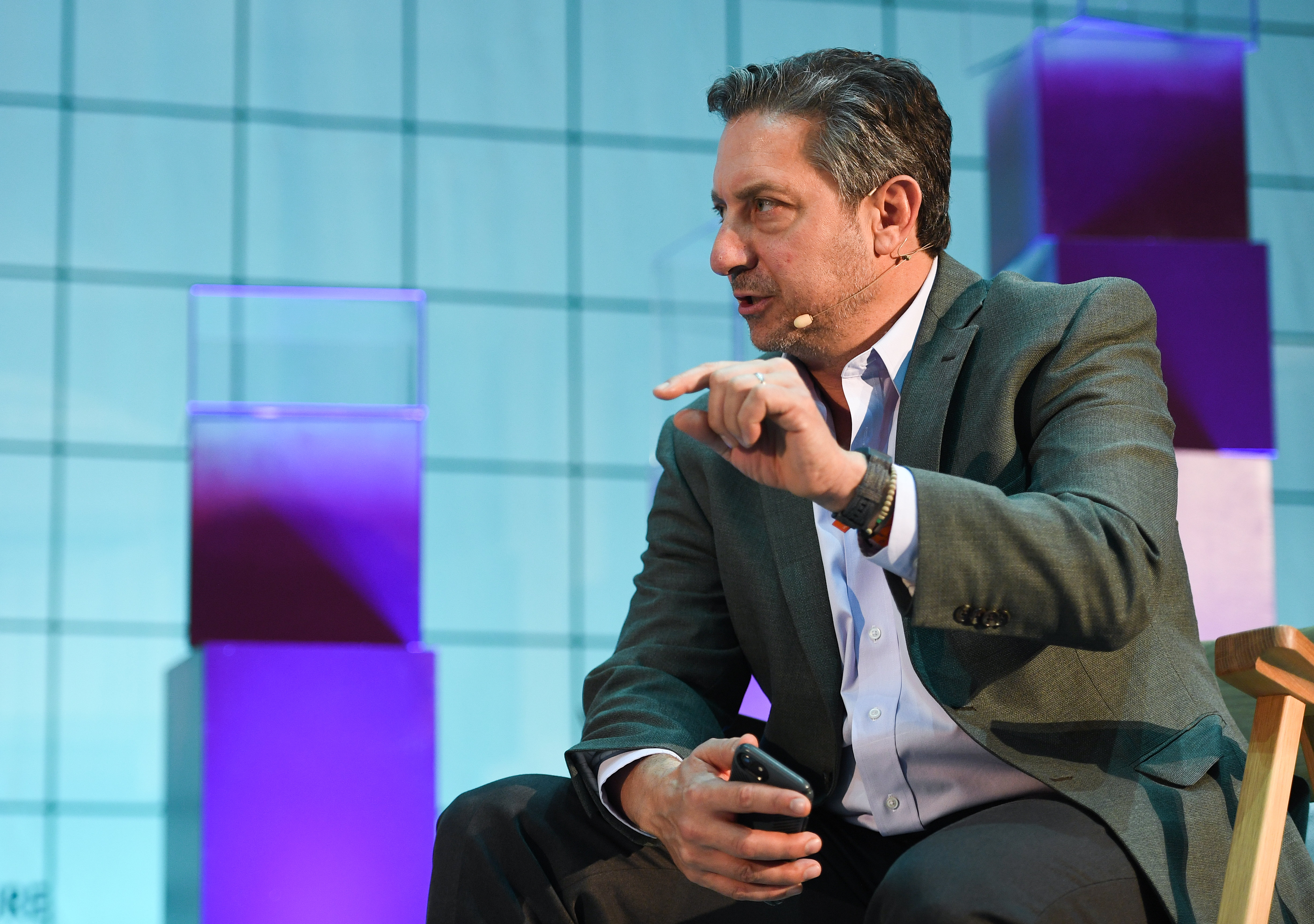
- Silver at the opening day of Web Summit 2019 in Lisbon
- Born: United States
- Citizenship: American
- Education: Colgate University (BA), New York University (MA)
- Occupation: Journalist
- Known for: Editor-in-chief of Investopedia

Caleb Silver is an American journalist and the editor-in-chief of Investopedia, a Dotdash Meredith brand focused on investing and financial education. He previously worked as the Director of Business News at CNN, the Executive Producer of CNN Money and was a senior producer on The Situation Room with Wolf Blitzer.

== Early life and education ==
Caleb Silver was born in New York City and raised in Santa Fe, New Mexico. He attended Colgate University as an undergraduate and received his master's degree from New York University's Arthur L. Carter Journalism Institute.

== Career ==
Silver began his career producing documentaries and wildlife films in South America and the American southwest. His career in business news began at Bloomberg in 1997, where he worked, as a senior television producer. While at Bloomberg, Silver was nominated for a 2003 Emmy Award for his work on Showdown on Secrecy, a series that explored conflicts of interest in the mutual fund industry.

After seven years at Bloomberg, Silver joined CNN in 2004 as an assignment manager in the New York bureau. He went on to become a senior producer for The Situation Room with Wolf Blitzer.

In 2008, Silver joined CNNMoney.com, where he was named executive producer and led the site's online video production. For their work on CNNMoney, Silver and his team were nominated for an Emmy Award for New Approaches to Business & Financial Reporting in 2008. The team also received an Eppy Award in 2012.

In 2012, he returned to CNN as the director of US business news, where he oversaw all of CNN's US business coverage.

Silver left CNN in 2014 to form Frog Pond Productions, a digital production and consulting company. He joined Investopedia in January 2016 as the vice president of content, overseeing the site's editorial and video efforts. He regularly appears as a financial expert on a variety of broadcast and radio programs, including MSNBC, Marketplace, NBC, ABC radio and Yahoo! Finance.

Silver was also the treasurer of the executive board of the Society for Advancing Business Editing and Writing (SABEW), elected in 2016. He was elected president of SABEW in 2021.
