= John Mitzewich =

American chef

- Born: John Armand Mitzewich
- Education: AAS Culinary Arts/Chef Training
- Years active: 2007–present
- Spouse: Michele Manfredi
- Culinary career
- Award won: Tasty Award 2011 Best Home Chef in a Series
- Website: foodwishes.blogspot.com

John Armand Mitzewich, more commonly known as "Chef John", is an American chef known for publishing instructional cooking videos on the blog and YouTube channel Food Wishes, with over 4.5 million subscribers and 1.1 billion views.

== Early life and education ==
John Armand Mitzewich graduated from Paul Smith's College, New York, in 1983. He received an Associate of Applied Science Degree, with Honors, in Culinary Arts/Chef Training, and was also honored as the school's 1983 "Outstanding Chef Training Student".

== Career ==
Mitzewich has held various positions in the restaurant industry, including executive sous-chef at the Carnelian Room, sous-chef at Ryan's Café, and garde-manger at the San Francisco Opera. Mitzewich was an instructor at the California Culinary Academy in San Francisco for five years before he left to focus on online teaching.

He has had a partnership with the online food network Allrecipes.com since 2010, and has published a cookbook for Paragon Publishing, America's Family Favorites: The Best of Home Cooking. Allrecipes later bought his channel. In 2011, he was awarded Best Home Chef in a Series by Taste TV.

== YouTube ==
Mitzewich began his Youtube channel, Food Wishes, in 2007. Each of his recipes is split between his blog and the video instructions on his YouTube channel; ingredient amounts and background information about the recipe are only available on the blog, and the method is only available on YouTube. He has noted that this allows him to get "paid twice" from the advertising on both sites.

Mitzewich deliberately keeps himself out of the shot on his YouTube videos, only displaying utensils, ingredients and his hands. He records the narration after the rest of the video is finished. His narrations are always done in a wandering and almost singsong tone of voice, a result of the editing process, in which he records each statement (consisting of a few words) several times and splices together the best takes. He includes one rhyming wordplay joke per video, usually of the form "You are, after all, the X of Y ", in which X and Y rhyme, X is a job title or the name of a celebrity, and Y is something relevant to the video. An example: "You are, after all, the Jim Kelly of what goes in your belly!"

Mitzewich includes powdered cayenne pepper in almost every recipe. He describes it as giving an "extra touch of the heat and bringing the unique tastes of the dishes forward".

As of June 2025, Mitzewich has over 4.61 million subscribers to his YouTube channel with over 1.1 billion views. Mitzewich has a content partnership deal with YouTube.

== Podcast ==
From May 2021 until December 2022, Mitzewich and Andrew Scrivani presented 33 episodes of the "Chef John Podcast". Each episode was hosted by Mitzewich and lasted from 15 to 35 minutes, during which he and Scrivani lightheartedly discussed recipes and created "top five" lists on food-related topics.

== Personal life ==
In 2019, Mitzewich and his wife moved to Sebastopol, California, where the two purchased a home. Mitzewich has used the community tab on his YouTube channel to provide updates on the home's renovation.
