= Handy Technologies =

American home services marketplace company

Handy Technologies, Inc.
- Website type: Subsidiary
- Founded: 2012; 14 years ago
- Headquarters: 134 West 29th St. New York, NY 10001; U.S.
- Founders: Oisin Hanrahan, Umang Dua, Ignacio Leonhardt, Weina Scott
- Industry: Online marketplace
- Services: Home cleaning, handyman tasks, home improvement services, assembly
- Employees: 200 (2021)
- Parent: Angi
- Website: handy.com

Handy Technologies, Inc. is an online two-sided marketplace for residential cleaning, installation, and other home services. Founded in 2012 in Cambridge, Massachusetts, the now New York–based company operates services in United States, United Kingdom, and Canada. The company was acquired by ANGI Homeservices in October 2018.

== History ==
Handy was founded in summer 2012 as Handybook by Oisin Hanrahan, Umang Dua, Weina Scott (a computer science graduate from Harvard University) and Ignacio Leonhardt (a graduate of Duke University and the London School of Economics). In fall 2012, it moved its headquarters from Cambridge, Massachusetts to Manhattan. The online household services marketplace they created follows a sharing economy approach and a business model that has been compared to Uber. The Handybook name was chosen as it was a place to book handyman and cleaning services.

Handybook was launched with incubation support from the Harvard Innovation Lab. In October 2012 Handybook raised US$2 million in seed financing from General Catalyst Partners and Highland Capital Partners. The following year in October 2013, Handybook raised further 10 million dollars from existing investors along with David Tisch's BoxGroup and other investors. The same month Handybook began talks to acquire the San Francisco–based Exec, a similar service for hiring people to complete household tasks. In January 2014, Handybook completed the acquisition of the company which helped establish its West Coast presence. By May 2014, the company was employing nearly a hundred people.

In June 2014, Handybook raised $30 million in a series B round of investment led by Revolution Growth. By this point, the company had expanded operations to twenty-six cities in North America, including Vancouver and Toronto. It also reported that the service was being used to complete about 10,000 jobs per week. In September 2014, Handybook changed its name to Handy. A week after the rebrand, Handy acquired Mopp, a similar London-based service, at an undisclosed valuation. After the acquisition, Mopp continued to operate under the same name, adding the subtitle “powered by Handy” to its brand. Mopp’s founders Pete Dowds and Tom Brooks stayed on to continue Handy’s expansion in the European market.

In November 2014, Handy was sued over a number of alleged labor violations, including that the company was deliberately misclassifying its employees as independent contractors.

In March 2015, Handy announced another round of funding led by TPG Growth, which raised 15 million dollars. In May 2015, TechCrunch reported that Handy was in talks to acquire its rival Homejoy. However, Homejoy shut down in July 2015 without being acquired amid worker classification suits. Immediately following the announcement of Homejoy’s expected shutdown, Handy offered a $1000 signing bonus to any Homejoy workers looking to switch to Handy’s service. In June, just a month before, Handy had announced completing its one millionth booking on the platform.

As of November 2015, the company planned to include the delivery and assembly of furniture as some of the services offered. Handy also announced its series D round of $50 million. This round of funding led by Fidelity Management & Research included contributions from several of the company’s previous investors.

In October 2018, ANGI Homeservices which owns HomeAdvisor and Angie's List acquired Handy.

== See also ==
- List of cleaning companies
