= Angie Hicks =

American businessperson

- Born: May 2, 1974 (age 52); Fort Wayne, Indiana
- Education: DePauw University (BA), Harvard Business School (MBA)
- Occupation: Chief Customer Officer of ANGI Homeservices Inc.
- Known for: Co-Founder of Angie's List

Angie Hicks (born May 2, 1974) is the chief customer officer of ANGI Homeservices Inc. and the co-founder of Angie's List (now known as Angi).

== Early life and education ==
Hicks grew up in Fort Wayne, Indiana. She earned a Bachelor of Arts degree in economics from DePauw University, and a Master of Business Administration from Harvard Business School.

== Career ==
Hicks interned during college at CID Equity Partners, a venture capital firm where she met venture capitalist Bill Oesterle. In 1995, Oesterle hired Hicks to start Columbus Neighbors, a call-in service and publication with reviews of local home and lawn services in Columbus, Ohio. After Hicks recruited over 1,000 members in one year, the company was renamed Angie's List. In 1996, it acquired Unified Neighbors, a similar company in Indianapolis, then moved Angie's List's headquarters to that city in 1999.

In 2017, IAC announced its plans to acquire Angie's List and combine it with IAC's HomeAdvisor to form a new publicly traded company called ANGI Homeservices Inc. Hicks became the Chief Customer Officer of ANGI Homeservices Inc., a digital marketplace service that connects consumers with service professionals for home repair, maintenance and improvement projects.

Hicks is a member of the Techpoint board of directors and a co-founder and past member of the board of directors of The Governor Bob Orr Indiana Entrepreneurial Fellowship Program. She was a member of the Indianapolis Chamber of Commerce board of directors until 2016.
