= Sunset Books =

American book publishing company

Sunset Books is a book publishing company that operates as a part of Southern Progress Corporation's Oxmoor House book publishing division. The Sunset Books division was created in 1946 when Sunset Magazine created a separate book division to publish content from its magazines. The company operates from Southern Progress's Menlo Park, California office and from Southern Progress's Corporate Headquarters in Birmingham, Alabama.

One of their best known books was the Sunset Western Garden Book, a compendium of plants suited for the various climatic zones and microclimates of the Western United States, and gardening guidelines for the region. The book has had numerous editions, including:

- Sunset Western Garden Book, edited by Kathleen Norris Brenzel, 2007
- Sunset Western Garden Book, edited by Kathleen Norris Brenzel, 2001
- Sunset Western Garden Book, edited by Kathleen Norris Brenzel, 1995, ISBN 0-376-03851-9
- Sunset Western Garden Book, New Edition, foreword by Joseph F. Williamson, edited by John R. Dunmire. Lane Magazine and Book Company, 1967
- Sunset Western Garden Book, by the editorial staff of Lane Publishing Co. under the direction of Walter L. Doty, Director, Editorial Research, Sunset Magazine and Paul C. Johnson, Editor, Sunset Books. Lane Publishing, 1954
