= Scott Kurnit =

American businessman (born 1954)

- Born: Scott P. Kurnit; March 25, 1954 (age 72); New York City, US
- Occupation: Entrepreneur
- Years active: 1974–present

Scott P. Kurnit (born March 25, 1954) is an American entrepreneur and angel investor in media and technology.

== Career ==
=== Early career ===
After graduating from Hampshire College with a BA in Communications, Kurnit became a Program Director at WGBY-TV (WGBH) He was the youngest program director in the PBS system and served as program director for QUBE, the world's first fully interactive cable television system.

=== Showtime ===
He started the first pay-per-view cable network and co-led the team that implemented the first use of national caller ID. Subsequently, he was president of Showtime Event Television

=== Prodigy and MCI ===
Kurnit led the team that put the first web browser into an online service at the Prodigy network. Following Prodigy, Kurnit joined MCI to oversee MCI's attempts to grow its business in the Internet market.

=== About.com ===
Kurnit founded About.com and was CEO during its growth to a public market value of $1.5 billion.

About.com was acquired by PRIMEDIA in 2001, and later sold again to the New York Times Company in 2005. Kurnit left the CEO position in 2001 after the sale to Primedia. In 2002 a class action suit was brought against About.com, Primedia, (About's former owner) Kurnit and others. The court dismissed all claims against Kurnit from the suit in August 2007.

=== Keep Holdings ===
Kurnit founded AdKeeper.com in early 2010. He was the chairman & CEO of Keep Holdings.com, the parent company of Keep.com (which allowed keeping, discussion and sharing of favorite products), TheSwizzle.com (a product for managing commercial offers in user email boxes), and AdKeeper.com (a means by which users could save online advertisements for viewing at a time of their choosing).

== Investor and advisor ==
Kurnit is either an investor or board member of Mashlogic, Brightcove, Goodmail, Dotomi, and OpenSky.

== Personal interests ==
Kurnit is on the board of Paley Center for Media.

== Awards and honors ==
Kurnit was inducted into the American Advertising Federation's Hall of Achievement, received the Vanguard Award from the National Cable Television Association, and won an Emmy Award as producer of a weekly television news magazine. Upside magazine named him one of the “Elite 100” leading the digital revolution. He was listed as one of the Silicon Alley 100 by The Business Insider for 2008.
