= Exec (errand service) =

- Type: Subsidiary
- Industry: On-demand services
- Founded: 2012; 14 years ago
- Founder: Justin Kan; Daniel Kan; Amir Ghazvinian
- Defunct: January 2014 (acquired)
- Fate: Acquired by Handy
- Headquarters: San Francisco, California, United States
- Products: Personal assistant services Cleaning services
- Parent: Handy
- Website: iamexec.com

Exec was a company based in San Francisco, United States, that provided companies and individuals access to on-demand personal assistants (for delivery, furniture assembly, research, etc.) and cleaning services.

It was founded in 2012 by Justin Kan, founder of Justin.tv, his brother Daniel Kan, and Amir Ghazvinian. The company was acquired by Handy in January 2014.

== History ==
Exec received $3.3 million in seed funding. In September 2013, Exec shut down its errand service to focus on its cleaning service . In January 2014, Handybook, a company founded by Oisin Hanrahan, Umang Dua, Ignacio Leonhardt, and Weina Scott in 2012 announced that it had acquired Exec.

== Business method ==
The jobs were dispatched to nearby individuals with the appropriate skills and good ratings, at a flat rate of $38 an hour .

== Reception ==
Exec was nominated for Techcrunch's 2012 TechCrunchie Award for Fastest Rising Startup. Exec's cleaning service garnered positive reviews from web publications such as TechCrunch praising their professionalism and efficiency. Exec also received positive coverage by other publications such as The New York Times, Huffington Post, Forbes, Inc., and Business Insider.
