= Cottage Living =

American magazine

Cottage Living was an American lifestyle and decorating magazine published by Southern Progress Corporation, a subsidiary of the Time Inc.

== History and profile ==
Cottage Living was started in 2004. Its first issue, September/October 2004, appeared on August 31, 2004. At the same time the website of the magazine was also launched. The magazine was headquartered in Birmingham, Alabama. Target audience was women. The monthly magazine was known for its "Best Cottage Communities" list in which it ranked living communities according to their cottage lifestyle ranking.

Cottage Living was named as Startup of the Year by Adweek in 2005 and as Launch Worth Watching by Advertising Age also in 2005.

The magazine folded with the issue November/December 2008. Its website was also closed.
