= David Quinn (actor) =

American actor, entrepreneur and teacher

- Education: University of Washington
- Occupations: Actor; entrepreneur; teacher

David Quinn is an American actor, entrepreneur and teacher, currently serving as the Director of IB Programs and IB Diploma Coordinator in The International Baccalaureate (IB) Diploma Programme at Harlem Village Academies Charter schools in New York City. In 2014, he founded The High School Counselor Challenge, a national social-media campaign with the goal of getting more public-school counselors from underserved communities to one of the admission profession's premier gatherings: The annual NACAC conference. In 2026, Quinn was the inaugural winner of the NACAC Philanthropic Leadership Award, honoring his outstanding contributions and service to the field of education.

As an educator, Quinn is a 2009 Recipient of the US Presidential Scholars Program's Teacher Recognition Award. In 2013, Quinn was honored by Northwestern University as one of the Distinguished Secondary Teachers in America. In 2013, he was selected as a Claes Nobel Educator of the Year and named one of the top ten educators in America.

Quinn began acting at the age of four, starting out as a regular on the enduring children's program Sesame Street. Between 1986–1988, he was the host of 3-2-1 Contact, the educational science series produced for The Public Broadcasting Service (PBS). In 1988, he hosted the TV series "I Have AIDS, A Teenager's Story" with noted AIDS advocate, Ryan White. The program won the Peabody Award. As a teen, Quinn went to noted performing arts training center Stagedoor Manor in New York for many summers, and roomed with friend Jon Cryer. In 2026, at the celebration of Stagedoor Manor’s 50th Anniversary, Quinn was named the inaugural winner of the Lifetime Camper Award for his service to alumni, education, and the arts. In 1985, Quinn performed in the original Live Aid concert in Philadelphia, singing in the show's finale with the group "Children to Children". During his television career, Quinn appeared in numerous commercials and television programs before embarking on simultaneous careers in business and education.

In 1993, Quinn left acting for the field of secondary education. He earned a B.A. (English/Anthropology-Archaeology) and an M.Ed. from the University of Washington. While at the University of Washington, Quinn co-founded Allrecipes.com and became a founding partner of the Pinpoint Venture Group, which invests in startup companies in the Pacific Northwest. In 2003, he was a recipient of the Puget Sound Business Journal's 40 Under 40 Award, honoring young leaders in Seattle's business and philanthropic community. In April 2006, Quinn sold Allrecipes to Reader's Digest. Quinn also founded ZC Entertainment in Los Angeles, which creates celebrity-based charity events for major corporations. In August 2007, Quinn sold ZC Entertainment to SportsQuest, Inc. In 2010, Quinn returned to filmmaking, serving as Associate Producer of Order of Chaos, starring Milo Ventimiglia.

Currently, Quinn serves as an Artistic Advisor to the American Playwriting Foundation and sits on two advisory boards: SeriesFest, a showcase for new pilots from established and emerging content creators, and The AXS Foundation which focuses on increasing higher education access by simplifying the complex college application process. While in Seattle, Quinn served on the board of trustees of the 5th Avenue Theatre and on the board of directors of the Seattle Repertory Theatre.
