= Verywell =

Website

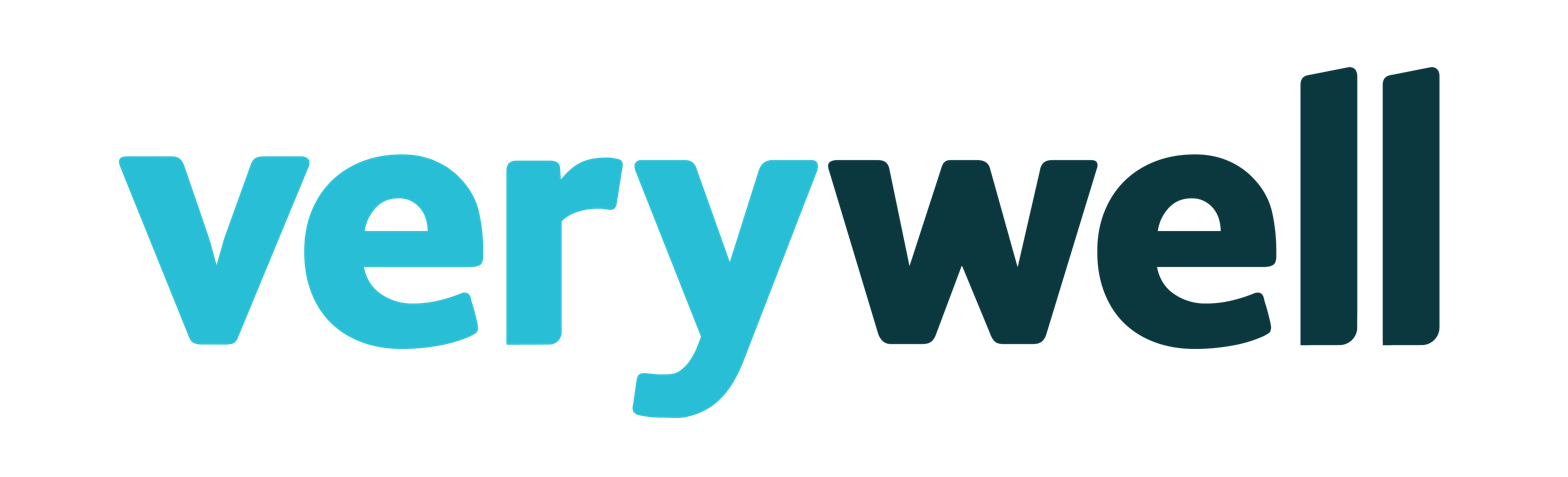
- Website type: Health and wellness information
- Available in: English
- Area served: Worldwide
- Owner: People Inc.
- Website: www.verywell.com
- Commercial: Yes
- Registration: No registration necessary
- Launched: April 26, 2016; 10 years ago
- Current status: Active

Verywell is a website providing health and wellness information by health professionals. It was launched on 26 April 2016 as a media property of About.com (now Dotdash Meredith) and its first standalone brand.

As of March 2017, it reached 17 million US unique users each month.

== History ==
About.com launched Verywell as its first standalone media property on 26 April 2016. The site took about half the health content that was already present at About.com, but the content was updated and made easier to read and navigate. The website hired Dr. David L. Katz as its first senior medical advisor. Verywell launched a partnership with the Cleveland Clinic in August 2016, helping promote content from the clinic's consumer health information portal. The second phase of the partnership, launched in January 2017, focused on providing resources to physicians and doctors.

By May 2017, About.com had transformed into Dotdash, an umbrella media brand of six distinct and specialized vertical sites ("content destinations"). While Verywell was about health, the others were about travel, learning, money management, home decorating, and technology.

== Website ==
Verywell has been recognized for its "fun, energetic tone," diverging from the starkly clinical feel of most health portals. This has been a deliberate strategy on part of Dotdash, with the website advising the visitors to "think of us as your friend who also happens to be a doctor."

The website has split into four sites: Verywell Health (the main domain), Verywell Fit, Verywell Family, and Verywell Mind, focusing mainly on psychology.

In August 2024, the Verywell Family site was shut down, with a recommendation to visit another Dotdash Meredith site, Parents.com.

== Traffic ==
As of March 2017, Verywell ranked in the top 10 health information sites, reaching 17 million US unique users each month.

The site has a multiplatform audience, which also includes traffic from DailyBurn and Cleveland Clinic. It is mostly search-dependent, as 70 percent of its monthly desktop traffic comes from search results. Verywell claims that 15 percent of its traffic is direct, an increase compared to the period when its content was part of About.com (8 percent).
