= Leisure Arts =

- Founded: 1971; 55 years ago
- Country of origin: United States
- Headquarters location: Little Rock, Arkansas
- Distribution: C&T Publishing
- Publication types: Books, craft kits
- Nonfiction topics: Craft
- Official website: leisurearts.com

Leisure Arts is an American publisher and distributor of "how-to" and lifestyle publications, craft kits and craft essentials.

== History ==
Established in 1971 in Libertyville, Illinois by Jean Leinhauser, Leisure Arts relocated to Little Rock, Arkansas in 1977 after she sold it. In 1992, the company was acquired by Time Warner and became a part of its Southern Progress division. Time Warner sold Leisure Arts to Liberty Media in 2007. The company was acquired by Comcast Corporation in 2014. Comcast sold Leisure Arts in 2019.
