= Bill Oesterle =

American venture capitalist (1965–2023)

William Seelye Oesterle (September 26, 1965 – May 10, 2023) was an American venture capitalist based in Indianapolis. In 1995, he co-founded of Angie's List with Angie Hicks. He ran Mitch Daniels' first campaign for governor of Indiana in 2004. He was co-founder of the Orr Fellowship and founded TMap, also known as MakeMyMove. A Republican, he was an outspoken critic of the Religious Freedom Restoration Act. He graduated from Purdue University and Harvard Business School.
