= Angi =

American home services directory website

- Founded: 1995
- Headquarters: Indianapolis, Indiana
- Owner: Angi Inc.
- Founders: William S. Oesterle, Angie Hicks
- Key people: Joey Levin (CEO); Angie Hicks (CCO)
- Industry: Contract marketplace
- Website: www.angi.com

Angi (formerly Angie's List) is an American home services website owned by Angi Inc., a publicly traded subsidiary of People Incorporated. Founded in 1995 by Angie Hicks and William S. Oesterle, it allows users to search for contractors to provide paid home improvement work.

The service was originally developed as a database of reviews for local services. Angie's List was a subscription-based service for most of its existence but shifted to a freemium model in July 2016. In 2017, the company was acquired by IAC and merged with HomeAdvisor. HomeAdvisor became Angi Leads. In January 2025, IAC announced plans to spin off Angi in the second quarter of 2025.

== History ==
Angie Hicks and William S. Oesterle founded Angie's List in 1995. The idea resulted from Hicks's search for a reliable construction contractor in suburban Columbus, Ohio, on behalf of Oesterle, a venture capitalist who was Hicks's boss. Hicks moved to Columbus to join Oesterle in creating Columbus Neighbors, a call-in service and publication with reviews of local home and lawn care services. The name and concept were based on Unified Neighbors in Indianapolis, Indiana. Hicks went door-to-door, signing up consumers as members and collecting ratings of local contractors.

After Hicks recruited over 1,000 members in Columbus within one year, she turned to Oesterle to raise money from investors to develop the business. In 1996, the company bought Unified Neighbors from its creator and moved the company's headquarters to Indianapolis.

By 1999, the database of local services and reviews was moved to the Internet. In the following years, the customer base and business relationships grew throughout the United States, while expanding coverage to include additional services, such as health care and auto care.

In 2010, Angie's List raised a total of $25 million in capital from investors. In September 2010, Wasatch Funds and Battery Ventures invested $22 million. In November 2010, Saints Capital led an additional funding of $2.5 million.

On November 17, 2011, Angie's List went public on the Nasdaq. In 2013, investors worried that the company had been in business for more than 18 years yet had never shown an annual profit, and that valuations of the company were unrealistic based on the revenue the company produced. By 2015, growth estimates indicated significant earnings-per-share growth, with a long-term growth rate of 19%. Citing this and stock estimates rising by 13.3% in 2015, some securities research firms, such as Zacks Investment Research, indicated that ANGI was well-positioned for future earnings growth.

Before 2015, the company had been dependent on capital infusions from investors to sustain its operations. In 2015, Angie's List had its first profitable year since its founding in 1995. In 2017, the company announced in a press release that it had had 2 million subscribers in 2013. In August 2015, it reported 3.2 million paid members.

With over two thousand employees by 2015 and its first profitable year, Angie's List executives planned to renovate the company's headquarters in Indianapolis. The $40 million expansion was expected to add over a thousand jobs to the area over the following several years, but the company canceled its plans in protest of Indiana's Religious Freedom Restoration Act(RFRA). The law allowed individuals and companies to deny services in situations that "substantially burdened" the expression of their religious beliefs. Angie's List joined several other Indiana-based companies in condemning the law as discriminatory against LGBTQ+ people and refused to expand the company within the state until its repeal.

In July 2016, Angie's List was made a freemium service; the basic membership tier, which includes access to more than 10 million reviews, was made free, alongside subscription tiers offering additional functionality. On May 2, 2017, IAC, owner of HomeAdvisor, announced that it had agreed to acquire Angie's List for $8.50 per share, valuing the company at over $500 million. On October 1, 2017, the two companies were brought under the new parent company ANGI Homeservices Inc., retaining its ticker symbol and stock history.

In March 2021, ANGI Homeservices announced that the company and Angie's List would be rebranded as Angi. CEO Oisin Hanrahan explained that despite its brand recognition, the name "Angie's List" was confusing to users as it did not reflect the service's current business model (which is now focused on connecting users to and booking contractors), and that the change was also intended to help emphasize its current ownership of HomeAdvisor and Handy.

In October 2022, Angi announced the appointment of Joey Levin, CEO of IAC and Chairman of Angi, as CEO of Angi.

In May 2023, Oesterle died.

== Criticism and controversies ==
A 2017 investigation by Chicago-based NBC Station WMAQ-TV found that many local "Angie's List Certified" contractors are unlicensed to do work.

David Segal found that when subscribers post a negative review of a company to Angie's List, a staff member discusses it with the subscriber in an attempt to rectify the situation. After they "fix the problem", they will remove the complaint.

== Litigation ==
In March 2007 SCS Contracting Group sued Angie's List and two members for libel because of negative reviews of the company. One of the sued members remarked, "if [contractors are] able to sue, then the value of Angie's List depreciates... People aren't going to be willing to submit reviews if they could be threatened with a lawsuit." On October 7, 2008, the plaintiffs dismissed the complaint against the two members. Summary judgment was later granted in favor of all defendants.

In 2014, Angie's List paid $2.8 million to settle a lawsuit alleging that it automatically renewed members at a higher rate than they were led to believe.

In August 2016, Angie's List agreed to settle three lawsuits for a payment of $1.4 million. The class-action lawsuits focused on Angie's List's acceptance of advertising payments from service providers, and whether those payments affect service providers’ letter-grade ratings, reviews, and place in search-result rankings. Angie's List denies plaintiffs’ claims, but disclosed that revenue from service providers can affect the order of search-result rankings of the service provider under certain settings.
