= Allrecipes =

Food-focused online social networking service

Allrecipes.com
- Website type: Recipe
- Available in: Multilingual (3)
- Owner: People Inc.
- Website: allrecipes.com
- Commercial: Yes
- Launched: 1997

Allrecipes.com, Inc. is a food-focused online social networking service headquartered in Seattle, Washington. The company was founded by University of Washington archaeology students Tim Hunt, Carl Lipo, Mark Madsen, Michael Pfeffer, David Quinn, and Dan Shepherd.

== History ==
Allrecipes.com was founded in 1997 after Hunt and Shepherd had trouble finding a cookie recipe on the Internet. The recipe sharing and cooking community website began as an offshoot of one of Seattle's first web companies, Emergent Media. The company's original website was CookieRecipe.com. After Cookierecipe, came Cakerecipe.com, Chickenrecipe.com, Pierecipe.com, Beefrecipe.com. After launching 38 different domains, the company consolidated all its websites into Allrecipes.com.

The core of the small founding team consisted of Yann Oehl, Kala Kushnik, Ursula Dalzell, and Sydny Carter. In 1999, Allrecipes.com hired Bill Moore, a former Starbucks executive, as its CEO. In 2006, Reader's Digest purchased Allrecipes.com for $66 million. They had a partnership with John Mitzewich, and later bought his channel.

Reader's Digest sold the company to the Meredith Corporation in 2012 for $175 million.

== Website ==
The recipes on the website are posted by members of the Allrecipes.com community and then copyedited by staff. Members of the community can also rate and review recipes, as well as add photos of the finished dish. Recipes are categorized by season, type (such as appetizer or dessert), and ingredients. Search functionality supports requiring and excluding specific ingredients. Other categories include methods (such as grilling or baking), occasions, cooking style, and recipes for specific holidays.

As of March 2023, the app for smartphones was no longer available or supported. Allrecipes.com was available for iPhone, iPad, Windows Phone, and Android users. Allrecipes.com's app for smartphones, Dinner Spinner, allowed users to access the site and its user-uploaded content while on the go. In 2011, Alison Sherwood of the Milwaukee Journal Sentinel rated the site as one of her "five favorite food apps."

In September 2015, Allrecipes.com launched a revamped website as part of a broader transformation into a social networking service for food lovers. The September 2015 website relaunch was met with broad criticism, with the most common grievance being the perceived decrease in usability.

Meredith closed 14 international Allrecipes domains on October 16, 2018.
