= Southern Living =

American lifestyle magazine

- Cover of the December 2024 issue
- Editor: Sid Evans
- Categories: Lifestyle magazine
- Frequency: Monthly
- Total circulation: 2,830,179 (2011)
- Founded: 1966; 60 years ago
- Company: Southern Progress Corporation (People Inc.)
- Country: United States
- Based in: Birmingham, Alabama
- Language: English
- Website: southernliving.com
- ISSN: 0038-4305

Southern Living is a lifestyle magazine aimed at readers in the Southern United States featuring recipes, house plans, garden plans, and information about Southern culture and travel. It is published by Birmingham, Alabama–based Southern Progress Corporation, a unit of IAC's People Inc..

== History ==
The magazine was started in 1966 by The Progressive Farmer Company and Emory Cunningham in Birmingham, Alabama. In 1980, the company changed its name to Southern Progress Corporation to reflect its increasingly diverse business, and in 1985, it was purchased by Time, Inc. for $498 million. In 2017 Time, Inc. was purchased by the Meredith Corporation, which acquired by IAC four years later.

== Cooking ==
One of the major topics in Southern Living is food, and since 1979, the magazine has published a popular Annual Recipes book each year.

== Homes ==
Southern Living regularly features floorplans, and over the magazine's history, a number of these have become popular home styles in the Southeast. Many of these plans are available for purchase as construction blueprints from the company's website.

== Southern Living at Home ==
In 2001, Southern Progress Corporation started a party-plan direct marketing company called Southern Living at Home. The products available at the parties include exclusive lines of home accessories and dishware seen in or inspired by Southern Living as well the various books and magazines produced by the company.

In April 2010, Southern Living at Home introduced its new name: "Willow House".

== See also ==
- List of United States magazines
- List of magazines by circulation
- Jenna Bush Hager
- Morgan Murphy (food critic)
