= Health (magazine) =

American women's health magazine

- Categories: Health news
- Total circulation: 1,370,770 (2011)
- Founded: 1981
- Final issue: April 2022
- Company: People Inc.
- Country: United States
- Based in: New York, NY
- Language: English
- Website: www.health.com
- ISSN: 1059-938X

Health (formerly In Health) is an American magazine and digital publisher owned by Dotdash Meredith. Previously, the magazine's topics range from improper diet to dealing with life issues such as weak relationships and growing stress. Currently, the website covers a broad range of health and wellness topics, spanning from chronic conditions to nutrition to health news.

News rating site NewsGuard rates the publication as reliable, noting that it generally avoids deceptive headlines and does not repeatedly publish false content, though it also notes that the website does not always clearly separate sponsored content from original writing. In 2019, Health launched Balance by Health, a Facebook chatbot and a 360-brand platform Wellness Warriors.

In November 2019, Meredith Corporation announced that it was investing more in the magazine. Meredith Corporation also announced that Cheryl Brown was joining the magazine as its executive editor. In 2021, the Meredith Corporation would be acquired by IAC.

In February 2022, it was revealed that Health would end print publications and switch to an all digital format. This occurred after Dotdash, a digital media company based in New York City, acquired Meredith and its brands, forming Dotdash Meredith.
