= Investopedia =

Website focused on finance and investing

- Website type: Online encyclopedia
- Available in: English
- Headquarters: 225 Liberty Street; New York, NY 10007; U.S.
- Owner: People Inc.
- Founders: Cory Wagner and Cory Janssen
- Editor: Caleb Silver
- General manager: Dylan Zurawell
- Website: www.investopedia.com
- Launched: June 6, 1999

Investopedia is a global financial media website headquartered in New York City. Founded in 1999, Investopedia provides investment dictionaries, advice, reviews, ratings, and comparisons of financial products, such as securities accounts. It is part of the People Inc. family of brands owned by IAC.

== History ==
=== Founding and early history ===
Investopedia was founded in 1999 by Cory Wagner and Cory Janssen in Edmonton, Alberta, Canada. At the time, Janssen was a business student at the University of Alberta. Wagner focused on business development and research and development, while Janssen focused on marketing and sales.

=== 2000s ===
In April 2007, Forbes Media acquired Investopedia.com for an undisclosed amount. At the time of the acquisition, Investopedia drew about 2.5 million monthly users and provided a financial dictionary with about 5,000 terms regarding personal finance, banking and accounting. It also provided articles by financial advisers and a stock market simulator.

=== 2010s ===
In August 2010, Forbes sold Investopedia to ValueClick for US$42 million. By then, the site had grown to more than 30,000 pieces of content and reached 2.2 million unique visitors per month. In 2013, ValueClick would then sell Investopedia and a group of other properties to IAC for $80 million. Following the acquisition by IAC, Investopedia launched several initiatives, including Investopedia Academy to sell educational technology. Investopedia operates under the leadership of CEO Neil Vogel.

In March 2015, David Siegel, an alum of Seeking Alpha, was hired as CEO of Investopedia. Caleb Silver was hired from CNN to oversee content operations for the platform in January 2016. In July 2018, Investopedia joined the Dotdash family of brands and laid off 1/3 of its staff, or 36 people. The site underwent a rebranding and relaunch later in the year.

=== 2020s ===
In 2020, editor-in-chief Silver described Investopedia's goal as "providing context around the news," rather than breaking new stories. The site launched its first podcast, The Investopedia Express, hosted by Silver, in September 2020.
