= The Balance (website) =

American website

- Website type: Personal finance
- Available in: English
- Area served: Worldwide
- Owner: People Inc.
- Website: www.thebalancemoney.com
- Commercial: Yes
- Registration: No registration necessary
- Launched: September 6, 2016; 10 years ago
- Current status: Active

The Balance is an American website focused on simplifying personal finance topics and news. Headquartered in New York City, The Balance is part of the Dotdash Meredith family of websites.

The Balance currently reaches 19 million unique viewers in the US each month.

== History ==
The Balance grew out of the financial content written for the website About.com, which was launched in 1996. The site was re-launched as a stand-alone personal finance vertical with updated content from About.com, as well as new content, on September 6, 2016.

The site was the second of five vertical sites launched from the content that had comprised About.com by Dotdash, the rebranded About.com entity.

== Website ==
While Dotdash launched all of its brands with a graphics-heavy design scheme, The Balance's is more restrained to "reflect the weightiness of the topic", according to Dotdash CEO Neil Vogel.

At launch, The Balance featured more than 34,000 pieces of content written by 70 contributors.

The site is written with a tone designed to appeal to millennials and younger generations, though it covers financial topics that are relevant to readers of all ages. It was created to serve what CEO Neil Vogel referred to as an underserved market: the average consumer. The Balance seeks to explain difficult personal finance topics in simple terms. As of its launch, the readership of The Balance was 60% women and approximately 50% millennials.

The site won the 2019 Communicator Award of Excellence for the Best Financial Services Site. Its general manager, Lauren Silbert, was named a winner of the 2019 Top Women in Media by Folio magazine and a 2020 HERo Future Female Leader by Yahoo! Finance.

== Traffic and revenue ==
The Balance had a readership of 6.5 million unique users when it launched in 2016, which grew to over 17 million by October 2017. As of August 2020, The Balance was ranked #2 of financial news sites and reached 19 million unique US viewers.

The Balance is supported through display and performance-based advertising. At the time of its launch, Dotdash reduced the number of ads on its sites, including The Balance, by 35%, betting that "fewer, better ads will attract a larger audience."
