= Cooking Light =

American monthly food and lifestyle magazine (1987–2018)

- Editor: Hunter Lewis
- Categories: Cooking
- Frequency: Monthly
- Total circulation: 1,814,471 (2012)
- Founded: 1987
- Final issue: December 2018
- Company: People Inc.
- Country: United States
- Based in: Birmingham, Alabama
- Language: English
- Website: www.cookinglight.com
- ISSN: 0886-4446

Cooking Light is an American monthly food and lifestyle magazine founded in 1987.

Cover price is $12.99 an issue. Cooking Light, published by Dotdash Meredith, currently publishes 4 times annually. The magazine itself merged with Eating Well in 2018, but publishes separate special issues.

== Editors ==
- Katherine M. Eakin (1987–1993)
- Doug Crichton (1993–2001)
- Mary Kay Culpepper (2001–2009)
- Scott Mowbray (2009–2014)
- Hunter Lewis (2014-December 2018)
