= DailyBurn =

Health and fitness company

Daily Burn
- Website type: Health/fitness
- Available in: English
- Owner: People Incorporated
- Commercial: Yes
- Registration: Required
- Launched: 2007
- Current status: Operational

Daily Burn is a health and fitness company with a membership of approximately 2.5 million that provides workout and nutrition programs on a variety of web, mobile, and TV apps. Daily Burn streaming workout videos are led by master trainers and produced by Mason Bendewald, the director of Beachbody's P90X workout program. People Incorporated holds a majority stake in the company.

The website has an Apple iPhone and an Apple TV application which was a January App of the Week in The New York Times technology section. It was also named one of the top 100 websites of 2010 by PC Mag.

== Company history ==
Daily Burn was founded in 2007 by Andy Smith and Stephen Blankenship. Daily Burn was accepted into TechStars Boulder in the summer of 2008. In 2009, the site changed its name and URL from Gyminee to Daily Burn. IAC acquired a majority stake of Daily Burn in May 2010. The company established headquarters in the Frank Gehry designed IAC building, along the West Side Highway in the Chelsea neighborhood of Manhattan. Daily Burn's first product, an exercise and nutrition tracking app, was rebranded as Daily Burn Tracker in December 2011 and the company's new streaming workout video app was given the name Daily Burn.

In August 2015, Daily Burn launched Daily Burn 365, a live, daily fitness show hosted by JD Roberto.

== Production ==
Some Daily Burn videos are directed and produced by Executive Producer Mason Bendewald. Daily Burn 365 is produced by Zack McTee for Allegory Productions and created with Chris Vivion and Matthew Mills at Spacestation.

The following trainers and health experts have appeared in Daily Burn videos:

- Andrea Speir
- Gregg Cook
- Anja Garcia
- Cody Storey
- Ben Booker
- Judi Brown
- Eitan Kramer
- Keaira LaShae
- J.R. Rogers
- Brionhy Smyth
- Justin Rubin
- Bob Harper
- Alikona Bradford
