= Lifewire =

Technology news website

People Inc.
- Logo used since 2021
- Website type: Technology information and advice
- Area served: Global
- Owner: Dotdash Meredith
- Website: www.lifewire.com
- Registration: No registration necessary
- Launched: October 2016; 9 years ago

Lifewire is a technology information and advice website. The website's owner is Dotdash Meredith, originally About.com, which launched Lifewire in 2016 as one of its spin-off vertical sites.

As of April 2022, it had a global website ranking of 1432 by Alexa Internet.

== History ==
Lifewire was the third standalone brand of About.com, an IAC-owned media company, which broke up its collections of DIY and how-to information into branded vertical websites, and is a competitor to sites such as Techcrunch, Techradar, PCmag. Lifewire was preceded by Verywell, a health info website, and The Balance, a personal finance site. Lifewire became a top 15 technology website in the United States as it was launched in October 2016. It was a top 10 technology-information site in 2017, reaching 6 million monthly US unique users each month.

The purpose of Lifewire is to offer advice and answers on common technology questions and problems in a simplified format.

When it was launched, Lifewire featured 16,000 articles written by 40 people. Lifewire CEO described the website style "as if your BFF happened to be an iPhone expert."
