= Seeking Alpha =

Crowd-sourced content service for financial markets

- Company type: Private
- Website type: Financial commentary and analysis
- Available in: English
- Founded: 2004; 22 years ago
- Headquarters: Ra'anana, {{{location_country}}}
- Area served: Worldwide
- Owner: Seeking Alpha Ltd.
- Founder: David Jackson
- Key people: David Jackson (CEO)
- Industry: Financial publications
- Employees: 170
- Website: seekingalpha.com

Seeking Alpha is a crowd-sourced content service that publishes news on financial markets. It is accessible via a website and mobile app and offers both free and paid subscriptions. Independent contributors, mostly from the buy side, write almost all of the articles published by the service and are paid based on how many subscribers access their articles.

In addition to investment ideas, analysis, and news, Seeking Alpha publishes ratings on stocks from its contributing analysts, and its own quantitative stock ratings.

Seeking Alpha was founded in 2004 by former Morgan Stanley technology analyst David Jackson.

The company established distribution partnerships with MSN, CNBC, MarketWatch, NASDAQ and TheStreet.com.

== Seeking Alpha’s model for sourcing investment ideas and analysis ==
Seeking Alpha’s model for sourcing investment ideas and analysis uses a combination of crowd-sourcing, quality control by professional editors, and community feedback.

Investors and other non-professional analysts submit articles containing investment ideas or analysis to Seeking Alpha’s editors, disclosing positions in stocks they write about. Seeking Alpha’s editors decide whether articles meet the quality criteria to be published to the broader community. Contributors receive payment for published articles.

Feedback and additional perspectives are added by community comments. A dispute process enables the correction of material inaccuracies or the removal of articles.

== Results of recommendations (2005–2012) ==
In 2014, the Review of Financial Studies published Wisdom of Crowds: The Value of Stock Opinions Transmitted Through Social Media. Researchers from City University of Hong Kong, Purdue University and Georgia Institute of Technology analyzed approximately 100,000 Seeking Alpha articles and commentary published between 2005 and 2012. The researchers looked at the ability of Seeking Alpha articles to predict not only future stock returns (a variable susceptible to influence by analysts' published opinions), but also future earnings surprises (a variable unlikely to be influenced by published opinions). The authors found that views expressed in Seeking Alpha articles, as well as reader commentaries on those articles, did predict future stock returns over every time-frame examined, from one month to three years. Articles and reader commentaries also predicted earning surprises.

== Awards and recognition ==
In 2007, Seeking Alpha was selected by Kiplinger's as Best Investment Informant.

In 2011, Seeking Alpha Market Currents was listed as number one in Inc.'s list of Essential Economic blogs.

In 2013, Wired named Seeking Alpha one of the "core nutrients of a good data diet".

== Alleged use by stock manipulators, and subsequent policy changes ==
In April 2017, the SEC announced enforcement actions against 27 individuals and entities behind various alleged stock promotion schemes that left investors with the impression they were reading independent, unbiased analyses on investing websites, while writers were being secretly compensated for touting company stocks. Seeking Alpha was among the websites used by the stock manipulators.

Seeking Alpha responded in the same month by strengthening its policies to prevent use of its platform by stock promoters. The new policies required that articles on stocks suspected of promotion be review by a managing editor, IP tracking be deployed to cross-check article submissions against each other, and improved analyst ID verification.

In a subsequent study of articles published before Seeking Alpha’s policy changes, Joshua Mitts of Columbia Law School finds that pseudonymous articles published on Seeking Alpha between 2010 and 2017 showed evidence of use by short-sellers using pseudonyms to manipulate stock prices for short-term profits. He suggests that manipulation was enabled by Seeking Alpha’s policy of allowing contributing analysts to use pseudonyms without verifying their true identities, which allowed manipulators to switch identities without accountability. Mitts's study concludes that the publication of negative Seeking Alpha articles by a group of writers resulted in over $20 billion in mispricing and attributed this to manipulation. In a subsequent post, Mitts and John C. Coffee describe the manipulation. Seeking Alpha has not been held legally liable by either a court or the U.S. Securities and Exchange Commission and no definitive verdict has been reached in this matter.

Seeking Alpha’s subsequent policy on use of pseudonyms bars analysts from changing from one pseudonym to another, requires analysts with SEC actions against them to use real names, and disallows real-sounding pseudonyms.

Seeking Alpha’s subsequent editorial policies on short ideas require analysts to include links to sources to support key claims, and to contact the company’s management via email to give it an opportunity to respond to allegations of accounting irregularities or management wrongdoing. It disallows the use of exaggerated, inappropriate, or legal terminology such as “scam”, “scheme”, “fraud”, or “illegal” in titles, and disallows the repetition of allegations made by others, such as short sellers, in articles.

== See also ==
- Alpha (finance)
- Value Line
- Security analysis
- Securities research
- Stock valuation
- Financial analyst
