= Simply Recipes =

Cooking blog

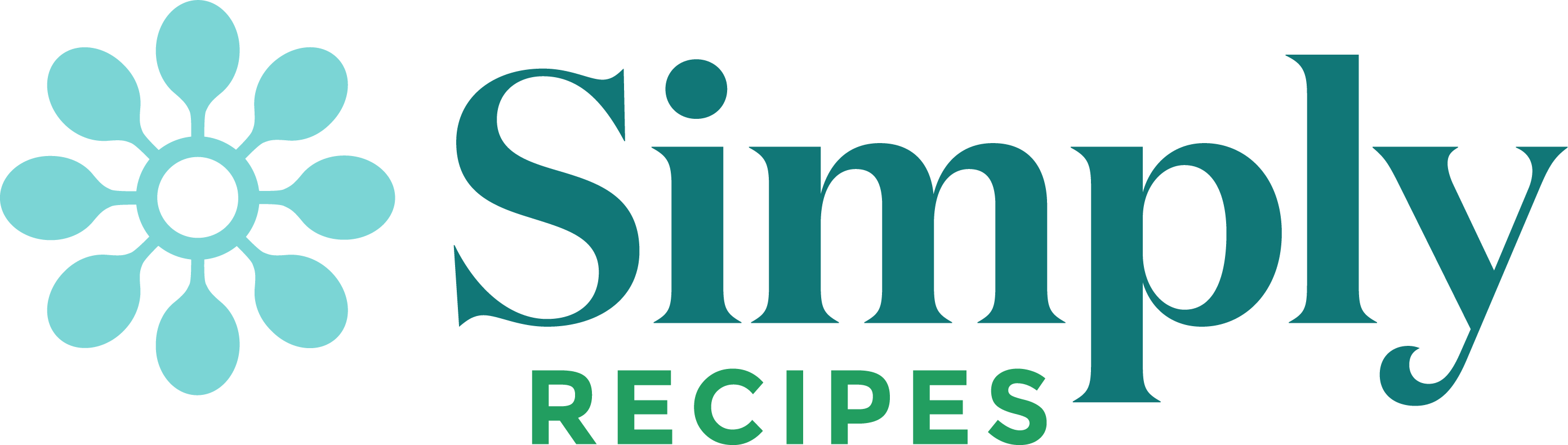
- Website type: Food blog
- Available in: English
- Owner: People Inc.
- Creator: Elise Bauer
- Website: simplyrecipes.com
- Commercial: Yes
- Registration: No
- Launched: 2003
- Current status: Online

Simply Recipes is a cooking blog founded by Elise Bauer. Bauer began writing the blog in 2003 to record her family recipes. Simply Recipes was acquired by Fexy Media in 2016, and later by Dotdash in 2020

== Content ==
Bauer writes about recipes for popular dishes such as meatloaf and apple pie, as well as how-to articles on subjects such as how to cook the perfect boiled egg or how to best caramelize an onion. The blog often features guest bloggers.

Each recipe is attached with a photo of the final product, along with several photos that portray each major step in the recipe. The website's posts are organized in categories, such as one that only includes recipes involving beef, appetizers, or low-budget meals.

== Reception ==
By January 2007, Simply Recipes was receiving over one million visits per month and had over 500 recipes. The Well Fed Network, a compilation of food blogs, awarded Simply Recipes the award for best blog overall of 2006. In 2010, Forbes magazine listed Bauer among "Eight Of The Very Best Food Bloggers." Bauer's blog has been described as taking a "relaxed approach" to food. Maggie Wrobel of The Globe and Mail appreciated the website's method of organizing recipes in categories, making it easier to find recipes that she was interested in.
