= People Inc. =

American digital media company

- Formerly: The Mining Company (1997–1999); About Inc. (1999–2017); Dotdash (2017–2021); Dotdash Meredith (2021–2025)
- Type: Subsidiary
- Industry: Digital media
- Predecessors: Meredith Corporation; Time Inc.
- Founded: April 21, 1997; 29 years ago (as The Mining Company)
- Founder: Scott Kurnit
- Headquarters: New York City, U.S.
- Key people: Barry Diller, Neil Vogel (CEO); Tim Quinn (CFO)
- Parent: PriMedia (now Rent Group) (2000–2005); The New York Times Company (2005–2012); People Incorporated (formerly IAC) (2012–present)
- Website: people.inc

People Inc. (formerly The Mining Company, About.com, Dotdash, and Dotdash Meredith) is an American digital media company based in New York City. Owned by People Incorporated, it publishes online articles and videos on subjects including health, home, food, finance, technology, beauty, lifestyle, travel, and education.

== Overview ==
The company operates 40 brands, including its flagship title, People, as well as Life, Food & Wine, Travel + Leisure, Better Homes and Gardens, Verywell, Allrecipes, Real Simple, Investopedia, Southern Living, Byrdie, Serious Eats, The Spruce, EatingWell, Health, Parents, InStyle, Simply Recipes, Entertainment Weekly, and Martha Stewart Living.

In August 2012, About.com became a property of IAC, which also owned Ask.com and numerous other online brands. The company's revenue is generated through advertising. As Dotdash Meredith, the company was headquartered in New York City and maintained additional offices in the New York metropolitan area, Des Moines, Iowa, and Birmingham, Alabama.

The Dotdash Meredith name was adopted in 2021 after IAC acquired Meredith Corporation, which had previously acquired and absorbed Time Inc. In 2025, the company rebranded as People Inc.

== History ==
Evolution of People Inc.
- 1922: Time Inc., the predecessor to the modern People Inc., was founded by Henry Luce and Briton Hadden, and it became the biggest magazine owner
- 1927: Time (Magazine), the namesake publication of Time Inc., began its annual Time Person of the Year
- 1930: Fortune was launched as Time's second magazine imprint to cover business journalism and economics
- 1936: Life, named after the older humor magazine, began publishing and popularized photojournalism
- 1941: In a famous editorial dubbed the American Century, Henry Luce envisioned U.S. foreign policy becoming more interventionist
- 1950s: Sports Illustrated launched as Time's dedicated sports magazine with a focus on vivid photography
- 1961: Time-Life was established as Time's marketing division, and it grew into a minor multimedia company
- 1968: Little, Brown and Company was acquired and incorporated into Time as its book publishing division
- 1972: Time acquired Home Box Office, Inc. from Charles Dolan and began managing the HBO pay-tv network
- 1974: People was launched to serve as the spiritual successor to Life, with a focus on celebrities and popular culture
- 1985: Southern Progress Corporation was acquired, and Time gained notable imprints like Southern Living and launched titles like Cooking Light
- 1989: Time Inc. became a subsidiary under Time Warner after merging with Warner Communications, and its book assets were soon consolidated
- 1992: Time Warner Cable was established as the consolidated cable division of Time Warner, and until 2016, it was the second-largest cable operator
- 1997: AskJeeves launched online and became a major search engine; after the dot-com bubble, it declined and was bought out by IAC
- 1999: Pathfinder, a digital hub for Time imprints, was shut down due to unprofitability, and Time Warner later pursued a merger with AOL
- 2006: The Lagardère Group acquired the Time Warner Book Group and renamed it Hachette Book Group
- 2014: Time Inc. was spun off as a separate, public company from Time Warner due to the decline of print media
- 2018: After being acquired by Meredith, Time Inc. was dissolved, and non-core magazine titles were placed for sale
- 2021: Dotdash merged with Meredith, and the merged company became a subsidiary of IAC as Dotdash Meredith
- 2025: Dotdash Meredith rebranded as People Inc., adopting the name of its flagship magazine.

=== 1997–2005: Launch, renaming, Primedia acquisition ===
Founded in 1996 as The Mining Company, the site was launched on April 21, 1997 by Scott Kurnit, owner of General Internet, Bill Day, and a group of other entrepreneurs in New York City. The original goal was to maintain 1,800 topic areas, but after five years of operation, this number was reduced to around 700.

In May 1999, the company changed its name to "About Inc." and the website name from "miningco.com" to "about.com". The company was acquired by Primedia (now Rent Group), in 2000 through a deal valued at US$690 million, whereby Primedia swapped 45.2 million shares for About, Inc.'s 18.1 million shares. At the time of the acquisition announcement, About Inc. was measured at US$133 million in cash and no debt (September 30, 2000), while the Media Metrix company tallied 21 million unique monthly visitors—making it the seventh-most-visited "network of sites" at the time—a network of over 700 topic sites, sorted into 36 areas and 50,000 subjects, with approximately 4,000 advertisers. Following the purchase, which was finalized in the first quarter of 2001, the combined company was called "Primedia" and Kurnit remained chief executive officer (CEO).

=== 2005–2012: Times Co. acquisition ===
In February 2005, The New York Times Company (Times Co.) announced it was buying About.com, a purchase that was completed in the first half of the year for US$410 million. Google and Yahoo! were reportedly among the other bidders. Following the Times Co. acquisition, Peter C. Horan was appointed as About Inc.'s president and CEO, but he was soon replaced by Scott Meyer in May 2005.

In March 2007, About.com's patronage was measured at 33.5 million unique visitors. On May 7, 2007, About Inc. acquired ConsumerSearch.com—a site that generated 3 million unique monthly visitors during the first quarter of 2007—for US$33 million in cash following two other purchases made in the preceding eight-month period: UCompareHealthCare.com and Calorie-Count.com.

The About Group generated US$102.7 million in revenue in 2007, which represented a 135% increase from the time of the Times Co. acquisition. Meyer stepped down from the chief executive role in March 2008 and was replaced by Cella Irvine, who previously worked for Hearst Corp. and Microsoft Corp. In April 2011, Irvine launched the About en Español website, which was About's first Spanish-language channel and initially featured nine topics, including movies and makeup, that were to be expanded by around 100 by the start of 2012. The launch was part of an overall strategy that included a redesigned About.com homepage, a doubling of the number of "how-to" and do-it-yourself videos on About.com's 24 channels, and new outlets on About.com for advertisers.

In July 2011, Darline Jean was named CEO of the About Group, after the company's second-quarter revenues were $27.8 million. Jean had been its chief financial officer (CFO) and was promoted in September 2011.

=== 2012–2017: IAC acquisition, Neil Vogel appointment, relaunch ===
A media report published in August 2012 indicated that Answers.com had reached a preliminary agreement to acquire About.com for US$270 million. However, on August 26, Barry Diller's IAC announced that it would acquire About.com instead for US$300 million in cash. A source for TechCrunch later confirmed that Answers.com's offer was reportedly valued at US$270 million, but consisted of debt and equity in Answers.com.

In the corresponding press release, IAC explained that the acquisition would help bolster and accompany its existing properties, such as the Ask.com web search engine. Jean fulfilled her role as chief executive during the transition period, while ownership was transferred to IAC, and then left About.com shortly after the sale was finalized. At the time of the IAC acquisition, which was signed on August 26, 2012, About.com consisted of nearly 1,000 topic sites and over three million unique articles, while, in traffic terms, Alexa Internet ranked the site as number 37 in the U.S. and 80 in the global context.

On April 2, 2013, Neil Vogel became the new CEO of About.com. Up until March 2003, Vogel was a key executive member of the marketing and media company Alloy Inc., a role that he left to cofound the Recognition Media marketing business that is responsible for producing the annual Webby Awards event, as well as the Internet Week NY and Europe events. Vogel was selected by Business Insider for its 2012 "The Coolest People In New York Tech This Year" list, for his work as a venture partner of FirstMark Capital. As of May 2013, About.com was receiving about 84 million unique monthly visitors.

Following his appointment, Vogel's overall plan for About focused on social, mobile, and user experience, with an emphasis on increasing the amount of time that users remain on the site, rather than attracting people in the first instance. Vogel also stressed the importance of monetization in his numerous post-appointment interviews, and he included a summary of About's revenue model as part of his discussion of the future with Bloomberg:

[We make money] one way, in general: we're advertising-supported. And that's monetized two ways: we do a lot of display advertising, and we do a lot of people clicking on links that we get paid for from Google and others... If we have all this traffic, and we have all this content, if we can make people engage with content more, and spend more time here [About.com], and do more things, we're going to have more page views and much more of an opportunity to monetize About.

Vogel further explained that IAC has been able to create "compelling" content that manages to successfully engage Internet users, while About's content, in particular, is favored by the Google search engine. Furthermore, Vogel said that native advertising is a marketing initiative that he would like to explore with caution, as "it's a really big opportunity to let marketers talk to our audience in the voice that they're already comfortable with."

In April 2014, Vogel revealed to the media that the About.com team had grown from 100 employees to 176 and that the number of site contributors had increased by 20 percent. The company's developers updated the website's backend to be capable of handling a greater degree of interactivity at the front end, while a major emphasis was placed on responsive web design, as the traffic from mobile devices and tablets was measured at nearly 40 percent.

The About.com website was relaunched in September 2014, following a significant redesign that expanded upon the new homepage that debuted in July 2014. Based on an analysis of the needs of both users and advertisers, the redesign sought to create an improved user experience and facilitate social sharing, including the addition of social media buttons that were not featured at the time of Vogel's appointment.

=== 2017–2025: rebranding to Dotdash and merger with Meredith ===
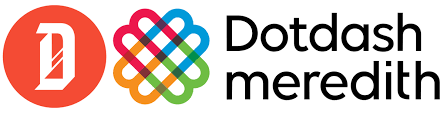
Dotdash Meredith logo, used from 2021 to 2025

On May 2, 2017, IAC announced the completed rebranding of About.com to Dotdash, after about a year of transition. "Dot" was a tribute to the About.com logo, and "Dash" signified forward motion. CEO Neil Vogel said that the company had lost mind share and needed to change its marketing strategy. According to Wired, the About.com brand was retired, despite its profitability, to make way for a new business model. The company refocused on vertical markets through its niche websites: The Balance (personal finance), Lifewire (tech), The Spruce (home and food), VeryWell (health), TripSavvy (travel), and ThoughtCo (education). On March 29, 2018, Dotdash won Digiday's Publisher of the Year. In July 2018, Dotdash acquired Investopedia. On October 15, TripSavvy launched the Editors' Choice Awards.

On January 8, 2019, Dotdash announced the acquisition of Byrdie (beauty) and MyDomaine (women's lifestyle) from Clique Brands. On May 15, Dotdash announced the acquisition of Brides from Conde Nast. In the spring of 2019, Dotdash's home site, The Spruce, announced the launch of its first-ever paint collection, The Spruce Best Home, in partnership with KILZ and sold exclusively on Amazon. On October 1, Dotdash announced the acquisition of Liquor.com.

On February 4, 2020, Dotdash announced the acquisition of TreeHugger and Mother Nature Network. In June, Dotdash was named Digiday's Publisher of the Year in Digiday's Media Awards 2020. The Spruce won for Best User Experience and CEO Neil Vogel won Executive of the Year. On September 22, Dotdash announced that it acquired Simply Recipes and Serious Eats from Fexy Media.

On October 6, 2021, Dotdash announced the acquisition of Meredith's magazine and other non-broadcast assets (including the former Time Inc. assets) for $2.7 billion, forming a new entity called Dotdash Meredith. The transaction was finalized on December 1. On February 9, 2022, Dotdash CEO Neil Vogel issued a memo revealing that six former Meredith Corporation magazines (Entertainment Weekly, InStyle, EatingWell, Health, Parents, and People en Español) would cease print circulation and switch to a digital-only format.

=== 2025–present: Rebrand to People Inc. and latest history ===
The company announced its rebranding as People Inc. on July 31, 2025. Vogel explained that the company wanted a simpler name that was more reflective of its business (suggesting that Dotdash Meredith sounded like a law firm or oil company), and chose to name it after People to reflect its position as its flagship property and to symbolize that, amid the growth of artificial intelligence, "People" was "a really good representation of our narrative and what we do in this world."

The company has also invested in live experiences and expanded its events portfolio, making events a core part of its business strategy.

The company has entered into several content licensing agreements with artificial intelligence companies. While still operating as Dotdash Meredith, it signed an agreement with OpenAI in May 2024, allowing OpenAI to use its content to train artificial intelligence models and provide attributed summaries in ChatGPT responses. In November 2025, People Inc. became a launch partner in Microsoft's Publisher Content Marketplace, an initiative designed to facilitate licensing agreements between publishers and artificial intelligence companies using their content; Microsoft's Copilot was identified as the marketplace's first buyer. The following month, People Inc. entered into a multiyear commercial content agreement with Meta Platforms, allowing Meta AI to draw on content from People Inc. and other participating publishers when responding to news-related queries.

People Inc. announced its acquisition of Feedfeed, a food publisher and creator network with more than 7 million social media followers and approximately 1,000 influencer partners, on October 1, 2025. Feedfeed retained its branding, while its approximately dozen employees and media assets became part of People Inc. The financial terms of the acquisition were not disclosed.

People Inc. announced layoffs affecting 226 employees, approximately 6% of its workforce, on October 9, 2025. Chief executive Neil Vogel described the reductions as part of a broader effort to redirect investment toward areas including social publishing, e-commerce, and events.

== Assets ==
Assets of People Inc.:

Health

- Verywell Health
- Verywell Mind
- Verywell Fit
- Health
- Parents

Finance

- Investopedia
- The Balance

Food & Drink

- Allrecipes
- Serious Eats
- Simply Recipes
- The Spruce Eats
- EatingWell
- Food & Wine
- Liquor.com

Home

- Better Homes & Gardens
- Daily Paws
- Martha Stewart
- Magnolia
- Midwest Living
- MyDomaine
- American Patchwork & Quilting
- Real Simple
- Southern Living
- The Spruce
- The Spruce Pets
- Successful Farming
- Wood

Beauty & Style

- Byrdie
- Brides
- InStyle
- Shape

Travel

- Travel + Leisure
- TripSavvy

Tech & Sustainability

- Lifewire
- TreeHugger

Entertainment

- People
- People en Español
- Entertainment Weekly
- LiveAbout

Premium Publishing

- Cooking Light
- Coastal Living
- Traditional Home
- Do It Yourself
- Country Home
- LIFE

== Offices ==
People Inc. has offices at three locations in the USA, including New York, Des Moines, and Birmingham.
