= HomeAdvisor =

Online home improvement & maintenance marketplace

- Formerly: ServiceMagic (1998–2012)
- Type: Subsidiary
- Industry: Local homeowner services
- Founded: December 1998; 27 years ago
- Founder: Rodney Rice, Michael Beaudoin
- Headquarters: Denver, Colorado
- Key people: Brandon Ridenour (CEO)
- Services: Home improvement marketplace
- Number of employees: 2,000
- Parent: Angi Inc.
- Website: www.homeadvisor.com

HomeAdvisor (Angi Inc. as of 2021) is a digital marketplace that connects homeowners with local service professionals to carry out home improvement, maintenance, and remodeling projects. HomeAdvisor incorporates home improvement project planning resources free to homeowners, and a paid network for service professionals. Professionals registered on HomeAdvisor's network are prescreened and must pass criminal and financial background checks.

HomeAdvisor is headquartered in Denver, Colorado and has offices in Evanston, Illinois; Fairfax, Virginia; Lenexa, Kansas; New York, New York; Indianapolis, Indiana; and Colorado Springs, Colorado.

After merging with Angie’s List in 2017, the company rebranded as ANGI HomeServices, and then later to Angi Inc. in 2021.

== History ==
HomeAdvisor, launched as ServiceMagic, was founded in 1998 by Rodney Rice and Michael Beaudoin who were part of the founding management team of Einstein Bros Bagels. In 2004, InterActive Corp (NASDAQ: IAC) acquired the website for an undisclosed price.

In 2007, it was announced that IAC would be split into five publicly traded companies. ServiceMagic remained part of the parent company. In January 2008, IAC appointed Craig Smith as CEO of ServiceMagic Inc.. He was previously the Senior Vice President of the company’s Consumer Division. With the change in leadership, co-founders Rodney Rice and Michael Beaudoin became co-chairmen and advisors.

In April 2011, Chris Terrill was hired as Chief Executive Officer. In October 2012, ServiceMagic rebranded as HomeAdvisor.

By 2015, HomeAdvisor had achieved more than $300 million in annual revenue, been used by more than 30 million homeowners, had nearly 100,000 pre-screened service professionals in its network and almost 3 million verified reviews.

On October 2, 2017, HomeAdvisor acquired Angie’s List and renamed itself ANGI HomeServices (NASDAQ: ANGI). IAC is now a majority shareholder in ANGI HomeServices, which is the parent company of HomeAdvisor. ANGI HomeServices operates 10 brands in eight countries, including HomeAdvisor, Angie’s List, mHelpDesk, HomeStars (Canada), MyHammer (Germany), MyBuilder (UK), Werkspot (Netherlands), Instapro (Italy) and Travaux.com (France). In 2021, the company rebranded to Angi Inc..

== Mergers & acquisitions ==
In October 2008, ServiceMagic acquired the French business 123Devis.com and Travaux.com, as well as UK business 123GetAQuote.co.uk to create ServiceMagic Europe. In March 2009, the UK business was rebranded as ServiceMagic.co.uk.

In 2013, HomeAdvisor acquired Werkspot.nl, the leading Dutch home improvement platform.

In 2016, HomeAdvisor acquired the German home services company, MyHammer.

In 2017, HomeAdvisor acquired Canada’s leading home services platform, HomeStars, and MyBuilder, the UK's leading home services platform connecting homeowners and tradesmen.

On May 1, 2017, HomeAdvisor parent company IAC announced they entered into a definitive agreement to combine IAC’s HomeAdvisor and Angie’s List into a new publicly traded company, to be called ANGI Homeservices, Inc.

On October 2, 2017, HomeAdvisor merged with Angie’s List to form ANGI Homeservices (NASDAQ: ANGI), the world’s largest digital marketplace for home services.

== Services and operations ==
=== Instant Booking ===
HomeAdvisor's Instant Booking lets homeowners schedule appointments online for hundreds of service categories without a phone call, with real-time availability provided by participating pros. The feature rolled out broadly by 2015.

=== Mobile app and lead management ===
Pros receive and manage leads via mobile, set preferences by job type and zip code, and are able to track responses.

=== Instant Connect ===
HomeAdvisor uses Instant Connect, a service where homeowners can contact or be contacted by a HomeAdvisor specialist via phone within one to two minutes to get advice or information about a potential service.

=== Scheduling integrations ===
Same Day Service allows homeowners to instantly schedule an appointment to complete their home project the same day.

HomeAdvisor has integrated with smart devices like Amazon Echo to allow customers to make appointments by asking Amazon's AI assistant to make a service appointment.

== Criticism and regulatory ==
Professionals registered on HomeAdvisor's network are prescreened and must pass criminal and financial background checks.

Several news articles have reported on the screening process of HomeAdvisor, investigating possible loopholes available to contractors that have been used by people who commit crimes.

HomeAdvisor has also received data security concerns over its use of Home Improvement Industry practices known as Pay Per Lead Services. HomeAdvisor collects users data when a request is made and then sells that data to local contractors in exchange for money. A previous claim that homeowners are unaware that their data is being sold to contractors has been refuted by HomeAdvisor via their own language used on their "contact forms" on their website. A standard CCPA/TCPA disclaimer is included at or above the "submit" button, which states that HomeAdvisor and its affiliates, as well as their networks of Service Professionals, may deliver marketing calls or texts to the user's number.

In April 2023, the FTC finalized a consent order against HomeAdvisor, requiring HomeAdvisor to pay $7.2 million USD and prohibiting the company from making "any false or misleading claims regarding its leads, including that they concern individuals who are ready to hire a service provider or who submitted a request for home services directly to HomeAdvisor."
