= William, Prince of Wales, in film and television =

Film and television depictions of British heir

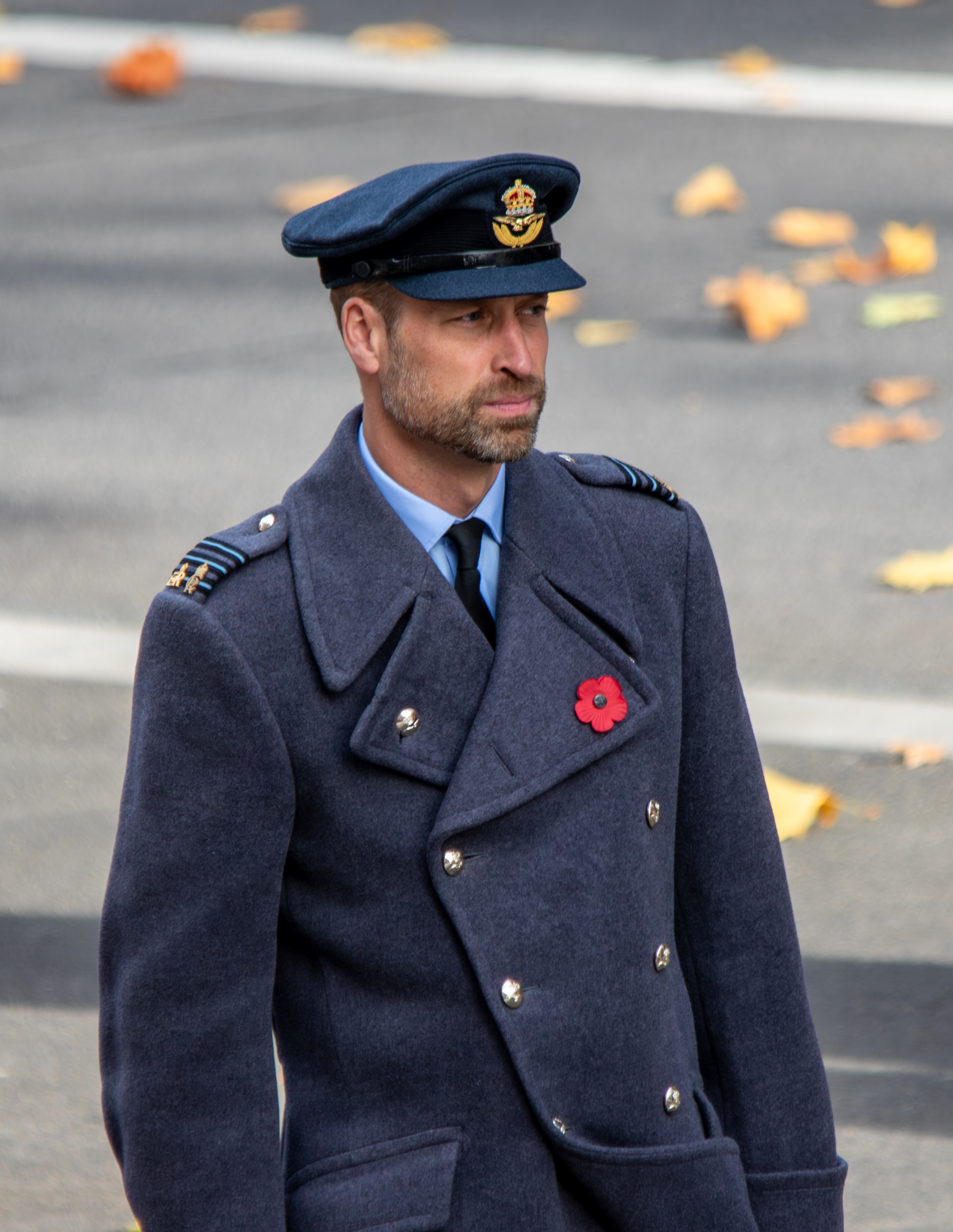
Prince William has been portrayed in various media, including Cars 2 and The Crown.

William, Prince of Wales (born 21 June 1982), is the heir apparent to the British throne. He has been the subject of various depictions in film, television and documentaries. These include fictionalised portrayals of William, such as by the actors Nico Evers-Swindell in William & Kate: The Movie and by Hugh Skinner in The Windsors, and appearances by William himself, such as in Diana, Our Mother: Her Life and Legacy and A Planet for Us All, a film on the prince's environmental advocacy.

From The Guardian to The Daily Telegraph, various critics have given commentary on the various representations of William in film and television. Moreover, some of the actors behind his depictions, including Oliver Chris and Ed McVey, have commented on their experiences portraying the prince. Furthermore, William has reacted to being portrayed in The Crown. In addition to film and television depictions, William is also the eponym of various namesakes, including the Duke of Cambridge Stakes and the Prince William Cup.

== Background ==
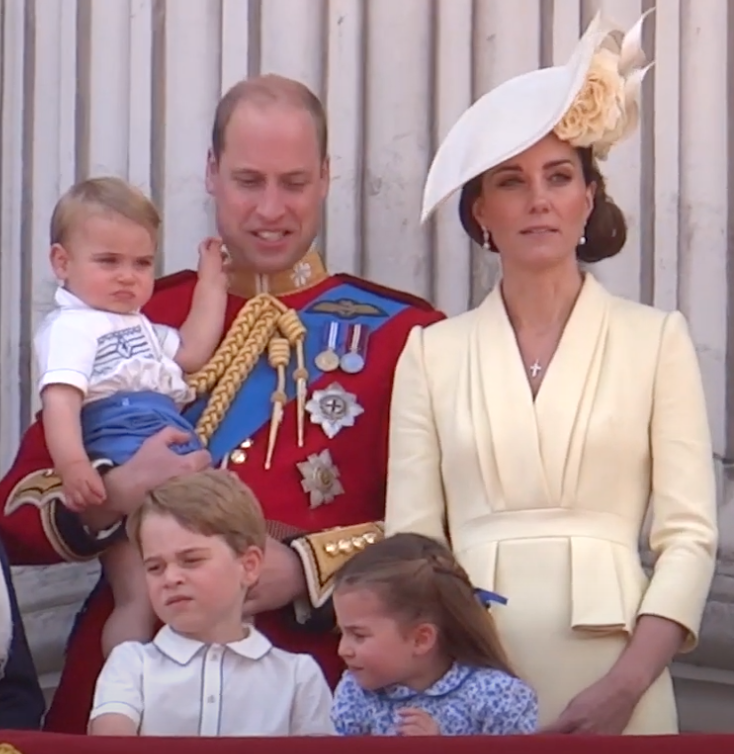
William at the 2019 Trooping the Colour ceremony with his wife Catherine and their three children, George, Charlotte and Louis

The eldest son of King Charles III and Diana, Princess of Wales, William was born on 21 June 1982 in London. He was educated at Eton College in England and the University of St Andrews in Scotland, graduating with a degree in geography at the latter institution in 2005. Afterwards, William undertook military service at the Royal Military Academy Sandhurst, eventually becoming a lieutenant.

On 29 April 2011, William married Catherine Middleton, whom he met while studying at St Andrews. The couple have three children: Prince George, Princess Charlotte and Prince Louis. In the course of his royal duties, William has increased public awareness of mental health, the natural environment, and homelessness. In 2017 he spearheaded Heads Together, a campaign which aspired to reduce the stigma of and provide vital assistance to people experiencing mental health conditions, with Catherine and his brother Prince Harry. In 2020 William launched the Earthshot Prize, a prize consisting of five challenges and recognizing solutions to environmental challenges. In 2023 he launched Homewards, a programme promoting a collaborative approach to ending homelessness.

== Film and documentary depictions ==
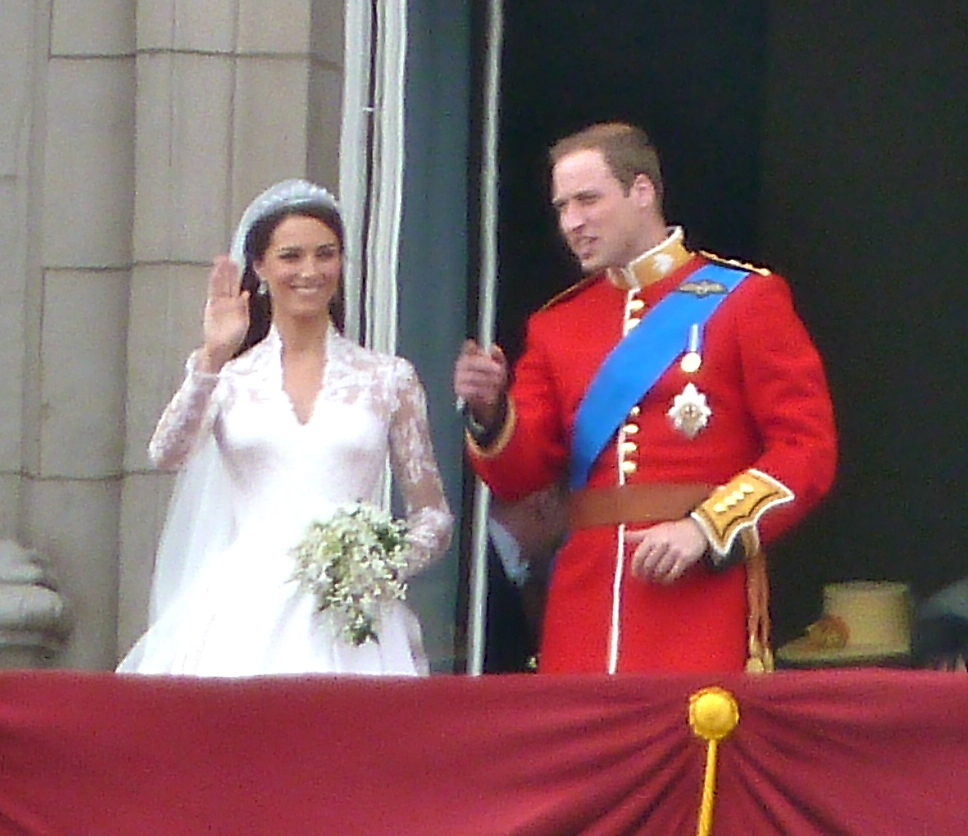
William and Catherine on the balcony of Buckingham Palace immediately after their wedding ceremony. Their romance was the subject of two films released in 2011.

William was the subject of the 2002 film Prince William, which portrayed William navigating his adolescence, as well as his relationship with Charles III. William was depicted by Jordan Frieda, who admitted in an interview that he believed the film was "tacky". Though the press gave Prince William a "drubbing", Ann Hodges, a television critic for the Houston Chronicle, commented that Prince William "keeps you watching".

Nine years later, William's relationship with Catherine was depicted in Lifetime's William & Kate: The Movie. William was portrayed by Nico Evers-Swindell, who researched his role in approximately five days. The Evening Standard commented that the film "was absolutely ace" and that the British people would cherish the production in ways not anticipated by the filmmakers. In contrast, Stephen Bates, writing for The Guardian, opined that Evers-Swindell's portrayal of William "varies from plain wooden to teak-like". In response to criticism of William & Kate: The Movie, Evers-Swindell said that the film production was neither British nor an in-depth look at the British royal family.

Also, in 2011, William's relationship with Catherine was the subject of the Hallmark Channel film William & Catherine: A Royal Romance. Dan Amboyer, who portrayed William, did not have background knowledge of the prince prior to starring in the film, and thus watched documentaries in preparation for depicting William. Writing for the New York Daily News, David Hinckley commented that Amboyer's portrayal made the attraction between William and Catherine "naturally credible". In contrast, Brian Lowry, writing for Variety, commented that if the depiction of William and Catherine in William & Catherine: A Royal Romance were to be believed, the couple would be two of the most boring people on the planet. Furthermore, William was the inspiration for Prince Wheeliam, a character in the Pixar film Cars 2.

In 2017 William was featured as a character in the BBC Two film King Charles III, an adaptation of the 2014 play by Mike Bartlett. He was played by Oliver Chris, who watched footage of William, his father Prince Charles (who did not ascend to the throne as Charles III until 2022) and Diana to prepare for the role. Writing for Vulture, Devon Ivie commented that Chris portrayed William "as a bit of a bumbling fool who's dominated by [Catherine] despite his good intentions". However, Mark Lawson, writing for The Guardian, opined that William was reasonably presented as being overshadowed by Diana in King Charles III via the appearance of the latter's ghost. Moreover, Chris has said that if William had seen his depiction, William "would see that it's done with an awful lot of respect and admiration". The same year, William spoke about his memories of Diana in Diana, Our Mother: Her Life and Legacy, which was directed by Ashley Gething. Despite calling the documentary less than certainly admirable, Brian Lowry, writing for CNN, commented that one need not be obsessed with the British royal family to appreciate William's grief. Moreover, Sam Wollaston, writing for The Guardian, described William's reminiscing of Diana as "normal, human, and moving". That year, William also described his reaction to Diana's death and processing the subsequent outpouring of grief from the public in Diana, 7 Days, which Harry Singer directed. Writing for The Daily Telegraph, Gerard O'Donovan commented that the documentary skillfully balanced the private grief of the people closest to Diana with the grief of the general public.

In 2018 William was depicted by Burgess Abernethy in Lifetime's Harry & Meghan: A Royal Romance. Writing for The Guardian, Amy Nicholson opined that Abernethy's depiction of William was "hopelessly stuffy and old" and "the end cap of a dynastic tradition that Harry and Meghan are excited to implode". In addition, Ed Power, writing for The Irish Times, referred to William's depiction in Harry & Meghan: A Royal Romance as essentially a Spitting Image puppet without the shade and humanity.

In 2020 William participated in the ITV documentary A Planet for Us All. In the film, William discusses his efforts to combat animal poaching and climate change. William has also spoken to Radio Times on A Planet for Us All, saying: "I feel it is my duty, and our collective responsibility to leave out [sic] planet in a stronger position for our children". Writing for The Independent, Sean O'Grady commented that A Planet for Us All was surprisingly moving and that William "is becoming quite an adept TV presenter". In contrast, Anita Singh, writing for The Daily Telegraph, opined that the documentary failed to comprehensively explain William's role in addressing the environment and conservation and that it would have been more instructive to see the connection between William's various initiatives. In 2021 William was depicted by Jack Nielen in Spencer, which was directed by Pablo Larraín.

In October 2024, William appeared in a two-part ITV documentary titled Prince William: We Can End Homelessness to mark the first anniversary of the Homewards initiative launched by the Royal Foundation. The Daily Telegraph noted that, despite using Prince William's royal appeal, it effectively humanises homelessness and highlights practical solutions through his genuine commitment. In December of that year, he appeared in a documentary titled The Earthshot Report, produced by the BBC Studios and presented by the actress Hannah Waddingham, which underscored the impact and progress of the Earthshot Prize's finalists.

In May 2025, William launched Guardians, a six-part BBC Earth series on the dangers faced by wildlife rangers. In October 2025, he featured in an episode of the Apple TV+ programme The Reluctant Traveler, alongside the actor Eugene Levy.

== Television depictions ==
=== The Crown ===
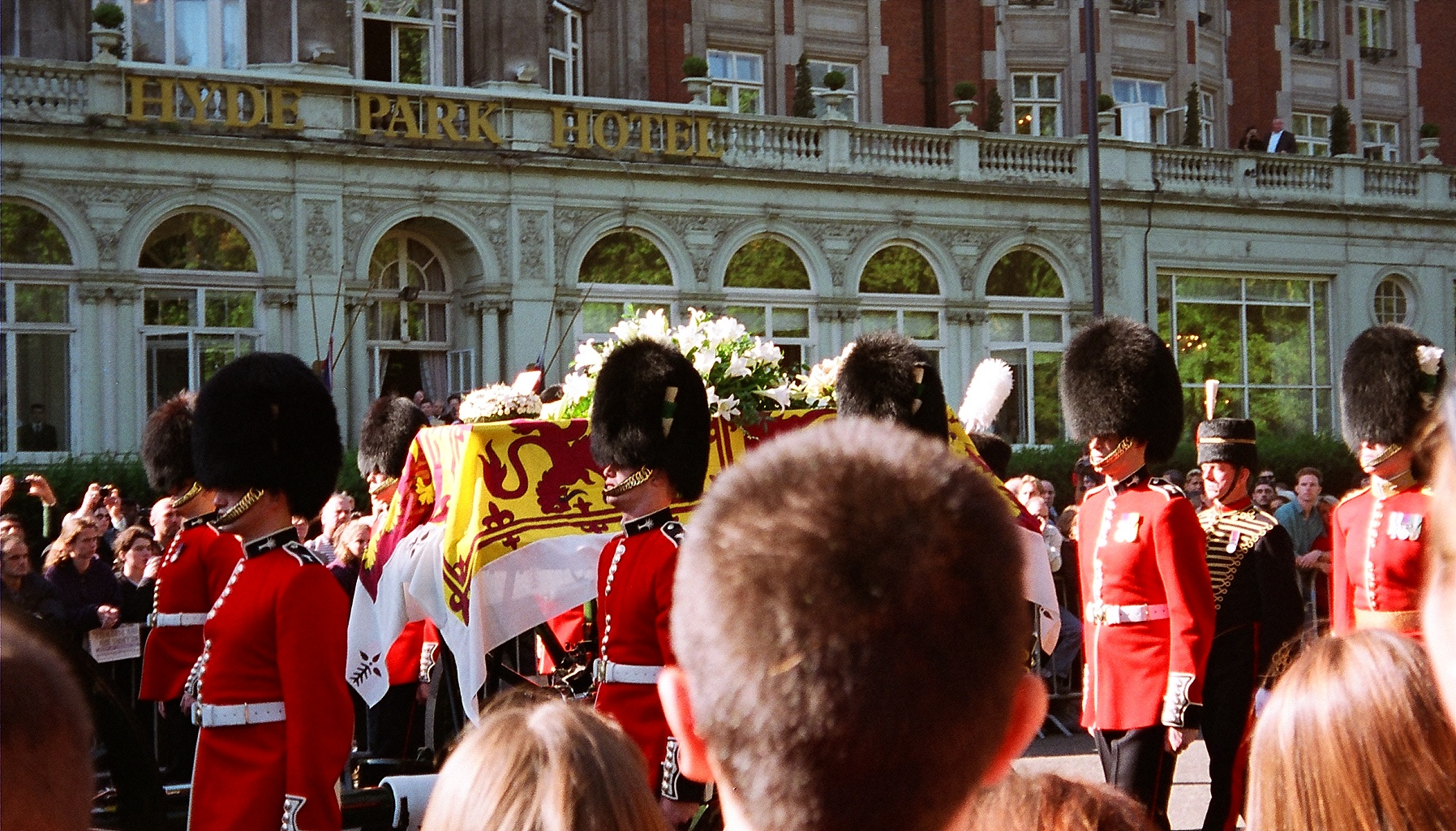
In season 6 of The Crown, William, as portrayed by Rufus Kampa and Ed McVey, processes the death of Diana.

Multiple actors have depicted William in The Crown, a television series that premiered on Netflix in 2016. In season 4 of the series, Lucas Barber-Grant portrays William. However, Barber-Grant would be replaced by Senan West in season 5 of The Crown, which chronicled the breakdown of Charles III and Diana's marriage.

Dominic West, Senan's father and the actor for Charles on The Crown, stopped Senan from portraying William in season 6 of the series to avoid conveying the news of Diana's death on screen to Senan. Consequently, Rufus Kampa and Ed McVey would depict William in the sixth and final season of The Crown. In these episodes, William is shown enduring the fallout of Charles and Diana's divorce, Diana's death, and meeting Catherine. In preparation for portraying William, McVey learned about the prince's physicality and experimented with his vocal pitch.

Writing for Time, Judy Berman commented that the grief shown by Kampa in his portrayal of William was "crowded out" by the royal stage-managing in season 6 of The Crown. Moreover, Martha Ross, writing for The Mercury News, opined that Kampa's William had been set up as the young hero of The Crown in the first part of season 6. Likewise, James Hibbs, writing for Radio Times, said that William was the "clear star" of the second part of season 6 of The Crown, describing McVey's portrayal as a "captivating screen presence". However, Hibbs also opined that the series had unnecessarily fabricated high drama in its depiction of William and Catherine's relationship. Similarly, writing for Rolling Stone, Alan Sepinwall commented that The Crown excessively focused on McVey's depiction of William. Furthermore, Sepinwall remarked that William had been presented as "a fairly normal kid" whose feelings towards Catherine would be roughly the same as if he were a non-royal character.

According to Robert Hardman, William had no plans to watch his portrayal in The Crown. Additionally, according to Hardman, William "rolls his eyes when people say that [The Crown] is just drama".

=== Other media ===
In 2011, William's marriage ceremony to Catherine would be parodied in the South Park episode "Royal Pudding". In addition, in 2014, William served as the inspiration behind the Prince of Canada, a character in the South Park episode "Freemium Isn't Free".

Hugh Skinner portrays William in the Channel 4 television series The Windsors, launched in 2016. In the series, William grapples with eventually becoming a king. In preparation for the role, Skinner watched a few interviews of William, and Skinner listened to William to develop the accent for the part. Skinner has also said that he does not believe William could take offence at his portrayal, noting that "the person they've written in the script is so good and heroic".

In the 2020s, William has been depicted in two scenes of Spitting Image: "Prince William Presents the Earthshot Prize" and "The Royal Succession".

In 2021, Iwan Rheon voiced William in HBO's animated series The Prince. In December 2025, William appeared in a video to mark the centenary of the charity Fields in Trust, of which he is patron, alongside the footballer Jill Scott, who is president.

== See also ==
- Cultural depictions of Catherine, Princess of Wales
- List of official overseas trips made by William, Prince of Wales
- Portrait of the Duke and Duchess of Cambridge
- Rosa 'William and Catherine'
- Royal William rose
- The Windsors: Endgame

== Footnotes ==
=== References ===
- Burchfield, Rachel (7 March 2024). "Prince Harry Made the Effort to See Older Brother Prince William While in the U.K. Last Month, But William Apparently Wasn't Interested". Marie Claire. Future plc.
