= Cultural depictions of Catherine, Princess of Wales =

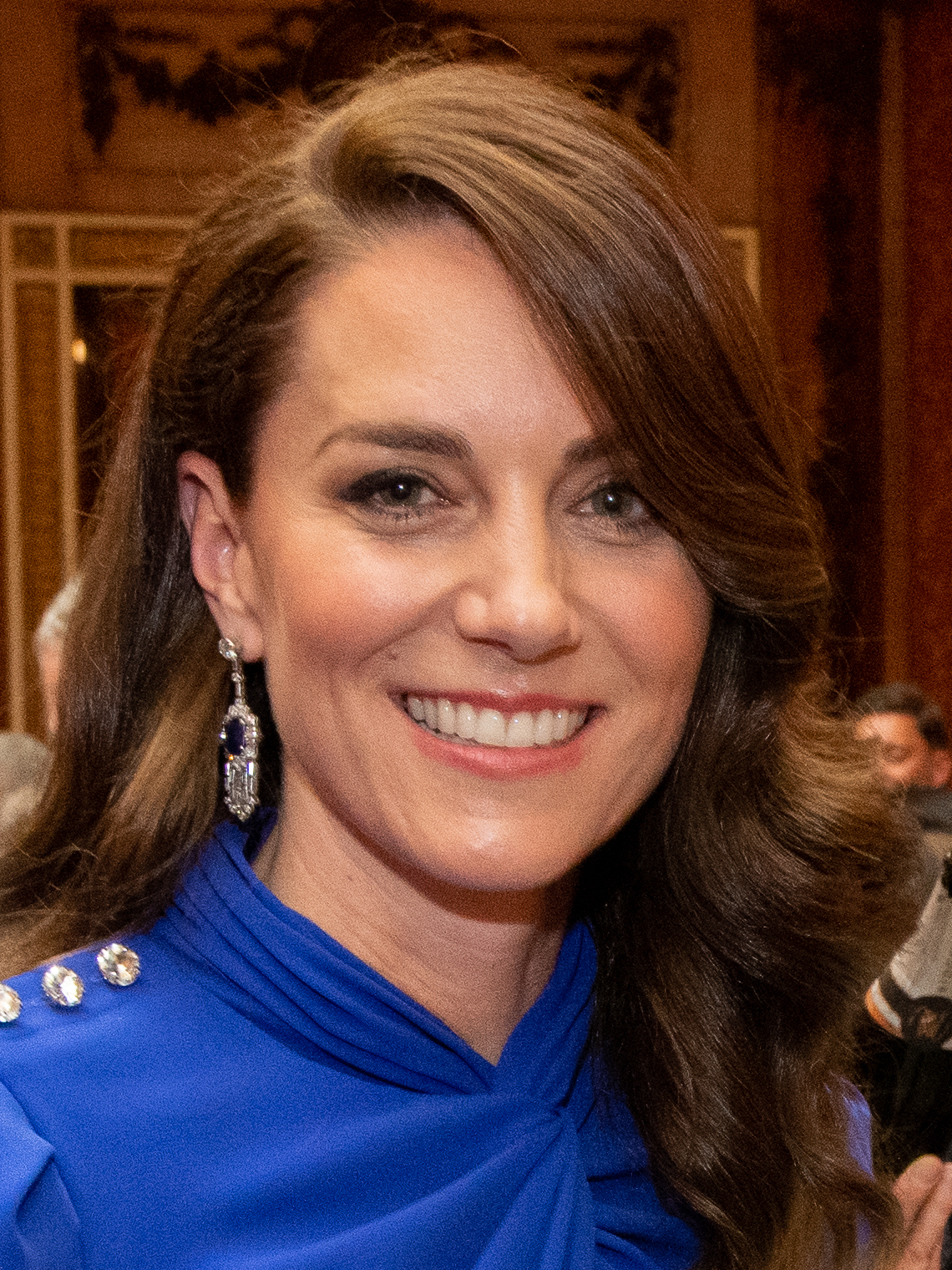
Catherine in 2023

Catherine, Princess of Wales, has been depicted in various forms of popular culture, including wax figures, portraiture, and screen portrayals.

== Portraiture ==
In January 2013, a formal portrait of Catherine by Paul Emsley was unveiled at the National Portrait Gallery, London. The portrait received mostly negative reviews; Michael Glover of The Independent called it "catastrophic" while Waldemar Januszczak of The Sunday Times described it as "disappointing".

A portrait of Catherine alongside Prince William, painted by Jamie Coreth, was unveiled in June 2022 at the Fitzwilliam Museum in Cambridge. The portrait received mixed reviews: The Independent's Jessie Thompson praised its "cheeky" sense of humour while The Daily Telegraph's Alastair Sooke found it "too safe" and "a little weird" in execution but noted it offered "a flash of their private selves".

== Wax figures ==
In April 2012, wax figures of William and Catherine were unveiled at Madame Tussauds in London to mark their first wedding anniversary. A new figure of Catherine was launched in May 2025 alongside those of William, King Charles III, and Queen Camilla.

== Film and television ==
Catherine has been portrayed in a range of dramatizations, documentaries, and satirical programmes. The 2011 American television film William & Kate: The Movie, released by Lifetime ahead of her wedding, starred Camilla Luddington as Catherine. It was widely panned by critics; Stephen Bates of The Guardian described it as "toe-curlingly … ghastly". That same year, Hallmark Channel produced William & Catherine: A Royal Romance, in which Alice St. Clair portrayed Catherine; People later included her performance in a retrospective of notable screen depictions.

In the United Kingdom, Catherine has been the subject of documentaries such as ITV's When Kate Met William: A Tale of Two Lives (2011), which chronicled her relationship with Prince William through archive footage and interviews. She appears as a character in the Netflix drama The Crown, where Meg Bellamy portrayed her in the sixth series, depicting her early courtship with William.

Catherine has also been parodied in satirical television. In the British puppet satire Newzoids (2015–2016), she appeared alongside Prince William and Prince George, with a sketch portraying them awaiting the birth of her second child. The 2021 animated series The Prince, created by Gary Janetti, featured her as a supporting character voiced by Lucy Punch. The series drew criticism for its portrayal of royal family members. Channel 4's soap-opera spoof The Windsors (2016–2020) also featured a fictionalised version of Catherine; The Guardian's Alexi Duggins called it a "right royal send-up".

== See also ==
- Personality and image of Elizabeth II
- William, Prince of Wales, in film and television
