= Diana, Our Mother: Her Life and Legacy =

- Genre: Documentary film
- Based on: Life of Diana, Princess of Wales
- Directed by: Ashley Gething
- Narrated by: Amanda Redman
- Country of origin: United Kingdom
- Original language: English

Production
- Executive producer: Nick Kent
- Producer: Ashley Gething
- Running time: 65 minutes
- Production companies: Oxford Film and Television

Original release
- Network: ITV, HBO
- Release: 24 July 2017

Related
- Diana, 7 Days

Diana, Our Mother: Her Life and Legacy is a 2017 documentary film broadcast in the United Kingdom by ITV on 24 July 2017 and the United States by HBO on 24 July 2017. It will also air on Seven Network in Australia, CBC in Canada, Three in New Zealand, NRK in Norway, YLE in Finland and TV2 in Denmark. It aired on 20 August 2017 on CBC News Network.

The documentary was one of two documentaries commissioned by Prince William and Prince Harry to mark the 20th anniversary of the death of their mother, Diana, Princess of Wales, and features interviews from the two princes, as well as the late princess' friends and family such as Sir Elton John and Earl Spencer. It includes previously unseen photographs, archival footage and home movies from Diana's childhood. The film focuses on the impact of Diana on her two sons and on numerous causes she was involved in her adult life such as AIDS, landmines, homelessness and cancer.

The documentary drew around seven million viewers in the UK – the most watched show television programme of the day in the United Kingdom and also the most watched factual of ITV since 2009.

== Cast ==
- Diana, Princess of Wales
- Prince William, Duke of Cambridge
- Prince Harry
- Charles Spencer, 9th Earl Spencer
- Sir Elton John
- Harry Herbert
- Lady Carolyn Warren
- William van Straubenzee
- Gerard McGrath
- Jayne Fincher
- Anna Harvey
- Victor Adebowale, Baron Adebowale
- Prof. Jerry White
- Dr. Ken Rutherford
- Graham Dillamore

== Reception ==
On Rotten Tomatoes, the film has an approval rating of 90% based on 10 reviews, with an average rating of 7.8/10. On Metacritic, the film has a score of 77 out of 100, based on 6 critics, indicating "generally favorable" reviews.

== See also ==
- Diana, 7 Days, the second 2017 documentary commissioned by the sons.
