= Diana, 7 Days =

2017 British documentary film

- Genre: Documentary film
- Based on: Death of Diana, Princess of Wales
- Directed by: Henry Singer
- Country of origin: United Kingdom
- Original language: English

Production
- Executive producer: Peter Dale
- Producers: Jenny Saunders, Jessica Ludgrove
- Editor: Paul van Dyck
- Running time: 90 minutes
- Production company: Sandpaper Films

Original release
- Network: BBC
- Release: 27 August 2017

Related
- Diana, Our Mother: Her Life and Legacy

Diana, 7 Days is a 2017 documentary film which was broadcast in the United Kingdom by BBC on 27 August 2017. The documentary is the last of two documentaries commissioned by Prince William and Prince Harry to commemorate the 20th anniversary of the death of their mother, Diana, Princess of Wales.

The film focuses on Diana's death and funeral and the effect it had on those closest to her and to the grieving public.

The documentary drew 5.6 million viewers – making it the most watched television programme that night in the UK.

== Cast ==
- Prince William, Duke of Cambridge
- Prince Harry
- Charles Spencer, 9th Earl Spencer
- Lady Sarah McCorquodale
- Tony Blair
- Alastair Campbell
- Richard Ayre
- Jayne Fincher
- Fergus Shanahan
- Malcolm Ross

== See also ==
- Diana, Our Mother: Her Life and Legacy, the first 2017 documentary commissioned by Diana's sons.
