= Portrait of the Duke and Duchess of Cambridge =

Painting by Jamie Coreth

- Artist: Jamie Coreth
- Year: 2022
- Type: Portrait
- Medium: Oil on linen
- Dimensions: 210 cm × 110 cm (83 in × 43 in)
- Location: Ely Cathedral

Portrait of the Duke and Duchess of Cambridge is the first official joint portrait of William, Prince of Wales, and Catherine, Princess of Wales (then known as the Duke and Duchess of Cambridge), unveiled at the Fitzwilliam Museum on 23 June 2022 in the presence of the couple. Following an idea by Sir Michael Marshall, Jamie Coreth was commissioned in 2021 by the Cambridgeshire Royal Portrait Fund, which is held by the Cambridgeshire Community Foundation, to paint a portrait of the Duke and Duchess as a gift to Cambridgeshire. The portrait was kept at the Fitzwilliam Museum for three years, but it was loaned to the National Portrait Gallery, London for a brief period in 2023 to mark its reopening. It will later on be displayed in different places and galleries across Cambridgeshire. The Duke called the painting "amazing" at the unveiling ceremony.

== Description ==
Portrait of the Duke and Duchess of Cambridge is the first official joint portrait of Prince William and Catherine. Coreth, the recipient of the 2016 BP Young Artist Award, described the process of creating the piece as "the most extraordinary privilege of my life". Regarding the work and its features, Coreth added that he "wanted to show Their Royal Highnesses in a manner where they appeared both relaxed and approachable, as well as elegant and dignified". He further stated that the piece is meant "to evoke a feeling of balance between their public and private lives". Kensington Palace announced that the portrait is set to be used "as a means of encouraging children and young people of all backgrounds from across the county to take an interest in art in all its forms".

The couple sat for Coreth twice at Kensington Palace, and later each had a solo session with the artist. The 210 centimeter by 110 centimeter oil painting shows the couple standing side-by-side while gazing into the distance. William appears in a black suit with an eggshell coloured shirt and teal tie, while Catherine is shown wearing a metallic emerald green midi-dress and satin green heels. Pieces of jewellery worn by Cathrine include the Duchess of Cambridge's pearl pendant brooch, and Diana, Princess of Wales's Collingwood pearl earrings and three-strand pearl bracelet. The outfits were similar to the ones worn by the couple during their visit to Dublin in 2020. The background features tones and a hexagonal architectural motif that according to the artist were inspired by buildings across Cambridge.

== Reception ==
The portrait received a mixed review from critics. The Independent columnist Jessie Thompson praised the portrait for its "cheeky" sense of humour, and added "The future king and queen look camera-ready, but also like they're standing at a party, waiting for the champers tray to come round". The Telegraph's Alastair Sooke found it "too safe" and its execution "a little weird", but emphasised that it offers "a flash of their private selves, which counteracts the occasion's public formality". The Times's chief art critic Rachel Campbell-Johnston described the painting as a "swagger portrait", which depicts the couple as "shop window mannequins made to advertise a modern monarchy".
