= William, Prince of Wales =

Heir apparent to the British throne (born 1982)

William
- Prince of Wales
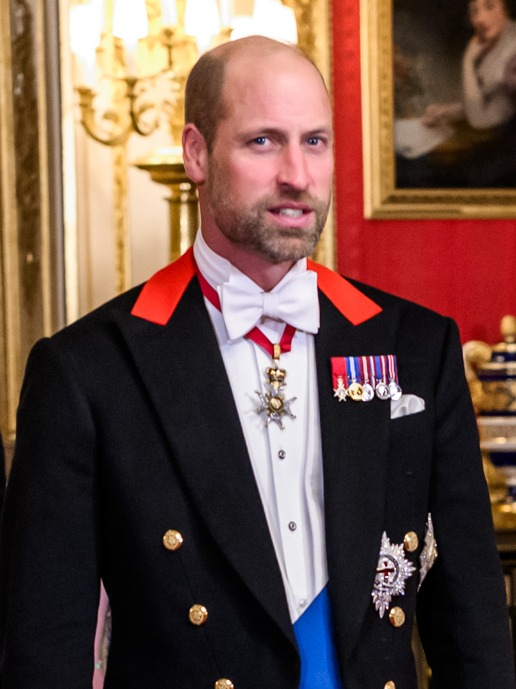
- William in 2025
- Born: Prince William of Wales; 21 June 1982 (age 44); St Mary's Hospital, London, England
- Spouse: Catherine Middleton (m. 2011)
- Issue: Prince George of Wales; Princess Charlotte of Wales; Prince Louis of Wales
Names
- William Arthur Philip Louis (Note: As a member of the royal family entitled to be called His Royal Highness, William does not normally use a surname. When it is needed, the surname is Mountbatten-Windsor. In his military career, he was known as Flight Lieutenant Wales. The middle name Louis is pronounced /ˈluːi/.)
- House: Windsor
- Father: Charles III
- Mother: Diana Spencer
- Education: University of St Andrews (MA Hons)
- Military career
- Allegiance: United Kingdom
- Branch: British Armed Forces (Note: William has served in all three branches of the Armed Forces (the British Army, Royal Navy and Royal Air Force).)
- Active service: 2006–2013
- Rank: See list
- Units: Blues and Royals; HMS Iron Duke; RAF Search and Rescue Force

William, Prince of Wales (William Arthur Philip Louis; born 21 June 1982) is the heir apparent to the British throne. He is the elder son of King Charles III and Diana, Princess of Wales.

William was born during the reign of his paternal grandmother, Queen Elizabeth II. He was educated at Wetherby School, Ludgrove School, and Eton College. He earned a Master of Arts degree in geography at the University of St Andrews, where he met his future wife, Catherine Middleton. They have three children: George, Charlotte, and Louis. After university, William trained at the Royal Military Academy Sandhurst before serving with the Blues and Royals. In 2008, he graduated from the Royal Air Force College Cranwell and joined the RAF Search and Rescue Force in early 2009. From July 2015, he served for two years as a full‑time pilot with the East Anglian Air Ambulance.

William performs official duties and engagements on behalf of the monarch. He is patron of several charitable and military organisations, including the Tusk Trust, Centrepoint, The Passage, Wales Air Ambulance, and London's Air Ambulance Charity. Through the Royal Foundation, his work focuses on mental health, conservation, homelessness, and emergency workers. In 2020, he launched the Earthshot Prize, an initiative to incentivise environmental solutions.

William was made Duke of Cambridge immediately before his wedding in April 2011. He became Duke of Cornwall and Duke of Rothesay upon his father's accession to the throne on 8 September 2022. The following day, he was made Prince of Wales.

== Early life ==
William was born at 9:03 pm on 21 June 1982 at St Mary's Hospital, London, during the reign of his paternal grandmother, Queen Elizabeth II. He is the first child of Charles, Prince of Wales (later King Charles III), and his first wife, Diana, Princess of Wales. He was the first direct heir to the British throne to be born in a hospital. Buckingham Palace announced his name – William Arthur Philip Louis – on 28 June. He was christened in the Music Room at Buckingham Palace by Robert Runcie, then archbishop of Canterbury, on 4 August, which also marked the 82nd birthday of his paternal great-grandmother Queen Elizabeth the Queen Mother. (Note: William had six godparents: former King Constantine II of Greece (his paternal second cousin once removed); Princess Alexandra, The Honourable Mrs Ogilvy (his paternal first cousin twice removed); the Duchess of Westminster; Lady Susan Hussey; Lord Romsey (his paternal second cousin once removed); and Sir Laurens van der Post.)

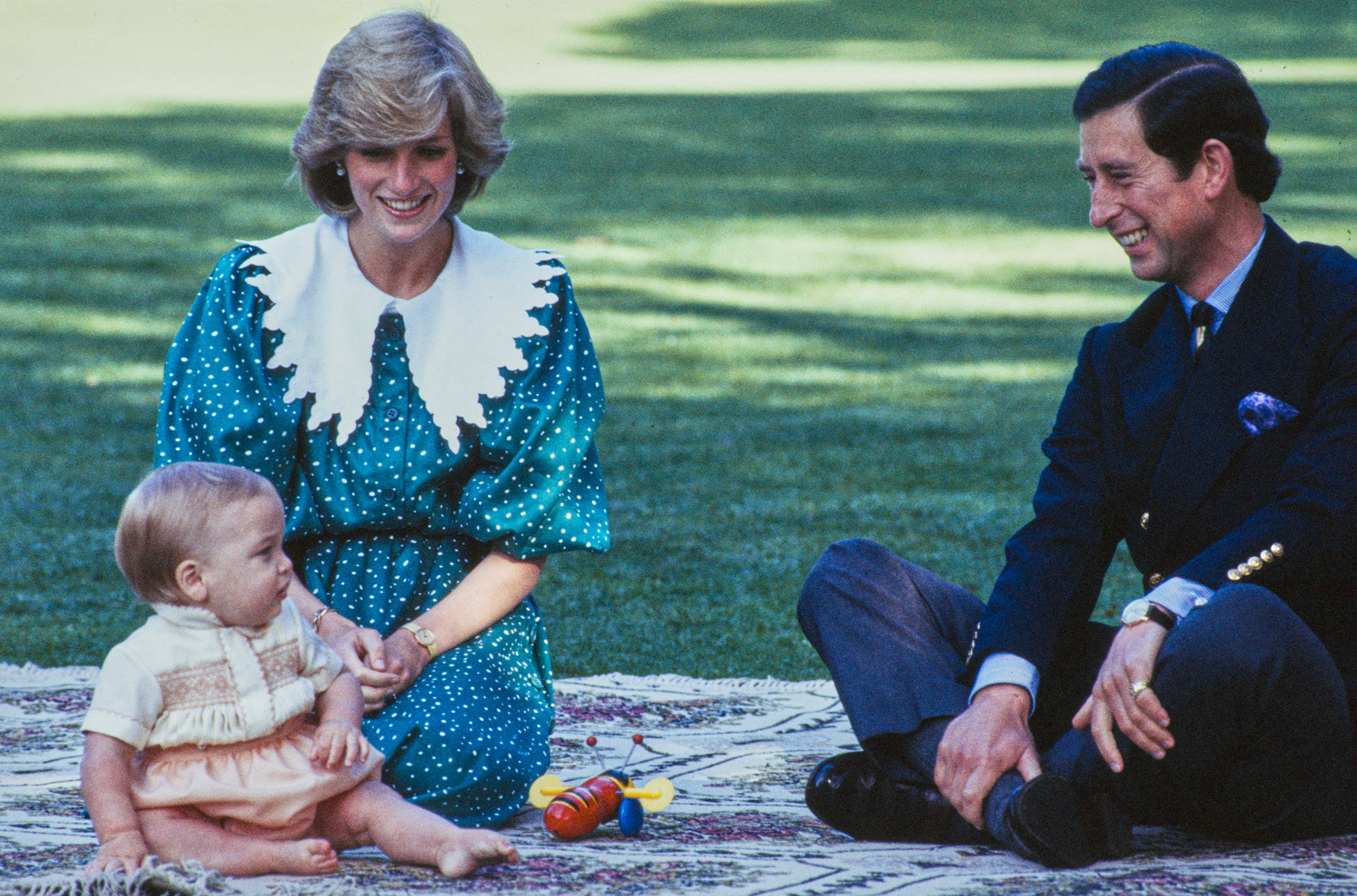
With his parents in Auckland playing with a Buzzy Bee during the 1983 tour of New Zealand

William was the first child born to a prince and princess of Wales since Prince John was born to Prince George and Princess Mary (later King George V and Queen Mary) in July 1905. When he was nine months old, William accompanied his parents on their 1983 tour of Australia and New Zealand, marking his first trip overseas. It was also the first time that a royal baby had been taken on an overseas tour. Family photographs of William and his parents on the grounds of Government House in Auckland received significant global coverage. They have been credited as a major reason for the Buzzy Bee toy, which William had been playing with, becoming a New Zealand cultural icon.

His younger brother, Prince Harry, was born in September 1984. The brothers were raised at Kensington Palace in London, and at Highgrove House in Gloucestershire.

Known informally as "Wills" within his family, William was nicknamed "Willy" by his brother and "Wombat" by his mother. Diana sought to give her sons broader and more typical life experiences beyond a royal upbringing, taking them to Walt Disney World, McDonald's, AIDS clinics, and shelters for the homeless. According to the biographer Robert Lacey, William – described as a "rambunctious" and "bratty" child – became "more reflective", with a "noticeably quiet character", after he began boarding school. Diana was reported to have described him as "my little wise old man", and by his early teens she had begun to rely on him as a confidant.

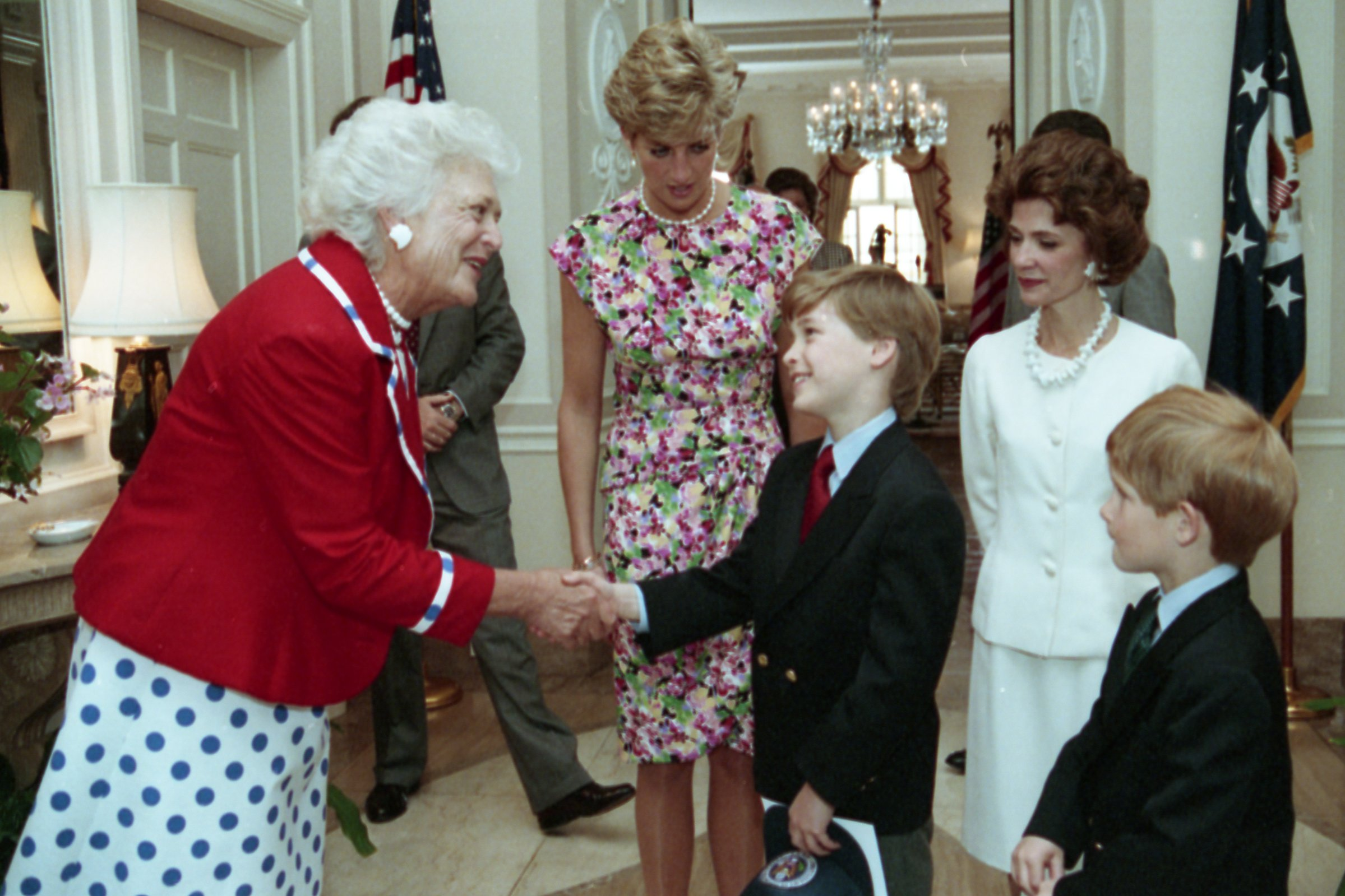
Shaking hands with Barbara Bush, 1991. His mother, Diana, and brother, Harry, look on.

William carried out his first public engagement while accompanying his parents on a visit to Llandaff on Saint David's Day in 1991. He and Harry travelled to Canada on an official visit with their parents in 1991, and again with Charles in 1998. William's parents divorced in 1996. Diana died in a car accident in the early hours of 31 August 1997. William, then aged 15, was staying at Balmoral Castle with his 12-year-old brother, his father, and his grandparents at the time. The following morning, Charles informed William and Harry of their mother's death.

William was reportedly uncertain about whether he should walk behind his mother's coffin during the funeral procession. His paternal grandfather, Prince Philip, Duke of Edinburgh, told him: "If you don't walk, I think you'll regret it later. If I walk, will you walk with me?". At the funeral, William and Harry walked alongside their father, grandfather, and maternal uncle Charles Spencer, 9th Earl Spencer, behind the funeral cortège from Kensington Palace to Westminster Abbey.

After his mother's death, William stated that he had been "in a state of shock for many years". He and Harry inherited the majority of the £12.9 million left by their mother on their respective 30th birthdays, a sum that had grown to £10 million each by 2014. In 2014, the brothers inherited their mother's wedding dress, along with many of her personal possessions, including dresses, diamond tiaras, jewels, letters, and paintings. They also received the original lyrics and score of "Candle in the Wind" by Bernie Taupin and Elton John, as performed by the latter at Diana's funeral. In 2002, The Times reported that William and Harry would also share £4.9 million from trust funds established by their great-grandmother, the Queen Mother, on their respective 21st birthdays, as well as £8 million upon their respective 40th birthdays.

=== Education ===
William was educated at private schools. He started at Jane Mynors' nursery school and the pre-preparatory Wetherby School, both in London, before continuing at Ludgrove School near Wokingham, Berkshire. At Ludgrove, he was active in sport before being admitted to Eton College, where he studied geography, biology, and history of art at A-Level, and took part in several sports.

The decision to send William to Eton broke with royal tradition, as his father and grandfather had both attended Gordonstoun. The royal family and the press agreed that William would be allowed to study free from media intrusion in exchange for periodic official updates. In June 1991, he was admitted to the Royal Berkshire Hospital after being accidentally hit on the forehead by a fellow pupil wielding a golf club. He suffered a depressed fracture of the skull and underwent surgery at Great Ormond Street Hospital, leaving a permanent scar. The incident received widespread media attention.

After leaving Eton, William took a gap year. He joined British Army training exercises in Belize, worked on English dairy farms, and visited Africa. He also spent 10 weeks in southern Chile with Raleigh International, taking part in community projects and teaching English.

In 2001, William enrolled at the University of St Andrews in Scotland. As at Eton, the media agreed not to invade his privacy, and students were warned not to leak stories to the press. He initially studied art history but later changed his main subject to geography. He focused his dissertation on the Rodrigues coral reefs in the Indian Ocean and graduated with an undergraduate Master of Arts (MA Hons) degree with upper second-class honours in 2005. While at university, he represented the Scottish national universities water polo team at the Celtic Nations tournament in 2004. He was reportedly known as "Steve" by other students to prevent journalists from identifying him.

== Early appointments and duties ==
At the age of 21, William became a counsellor of State. In July 2005, he undertook his first solo public engagements on an overseas tour of New Zealand, where he took part in World War II commemorations. In 2009, the Queen established a private office for William and Harry, with David Manning as their adviser. Manning accompanied William on his first official tour in January 2010, during which he visited Auckland and Wellington. The visit drew crowds of "many thousands", and the public reception was noted as being similarly positive to that of his mother's 1983 tour. In March 2011, William visited Christchurch shortly after the earthquake, speaking at the memorial service in Hagley Park on behalf of his grandmother. He also travelled to Australia to visit areas affected by flooding in Queensland and Victoria.

Before attending Sandhurst, William completed a three-week internship at several institutions, including the Bank of England, the London Stock Exchange, and Lloyd's of London. To prepare for his eventual management of the Duchy of Cornwall, he entered St John's College, Cambridge, in 2014 to undertake an executive agriculture management programme run by the Cambridge Programme for Sustainability Leadership (CPSL), of which his father is patron. In April 2019, Kensington Palace announced that William had completed a three-week internship at MI5, MI6, and GCHQ, during which he monitored extreme Islamist terror cells, identified potential threats abroad, and observed code‑breaking technology.

=== Military and air ambulance service ===
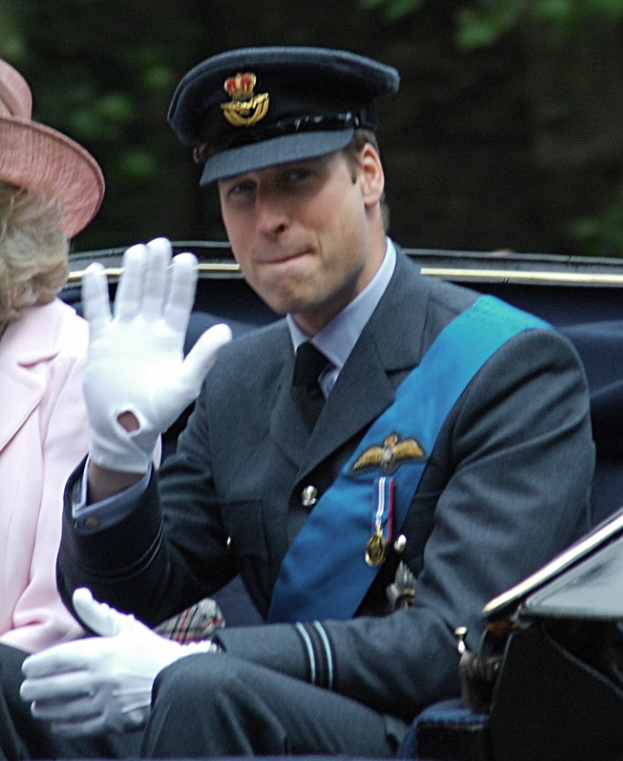
In Royal Air Force uniform at the 2010 Trooping the Colour

Having decided on a military career, William was admitted to the Royal Military Academy Sandhurst in January 2006. His admission required the successful completion of a 44‑week course as an Officer Cadet, which led to his commission as a British Army officer. As "Lieutenant Wales" – a name derived from his father's then title, Prince of Wales – he followed his brother into the Blues and Royals in December that year as a second lieutenant, after which he spent five months training for the post at Bovington Camp in Dorset.

Although the Queen approved William serving on the frontline, his position as second‑in‑line to the throne at the time raised doubts about whether he could be deployed to combat. Plans by the Ministry of Defence to send him to Southern Iraq were leaked, and the government ultimately decided against the move, concluding that he would endanger both himself and those around him if targeted. Attempts by his office to have him serve in Afghanistan were similarly blocked on security grounds. William instead trained with the Royal Navy and the Royal Air Force, obtaining his commission as a sub-lieutenant in the former and a flying officer in the latter, both broadly equivalent to the army rank of lieutenant. After completing his training, he undertook an attachment to the Royal Air Force at RAF Cranwell.

Upon completing the course, he was presented with his RAF wings by his father, who had received his own wings after training at Cranwell. During this secondment, William flew to Afghanistan in a C-17 Globemaster that repatriated the body of Trooper Robert Pearson. He was then seconded to train with the Royal Navy, completing an accelerated Naval Officer training course at the Britannia Royal Naval College. Whilst serving on HMS Iron Duke in July 2008, William participated in a £40m drug seizure in the Atlantic, north-east of Barbados. He was part of the crew on the Lynx helicopter that helped seize 900 kg of cocaine from a speedboat.

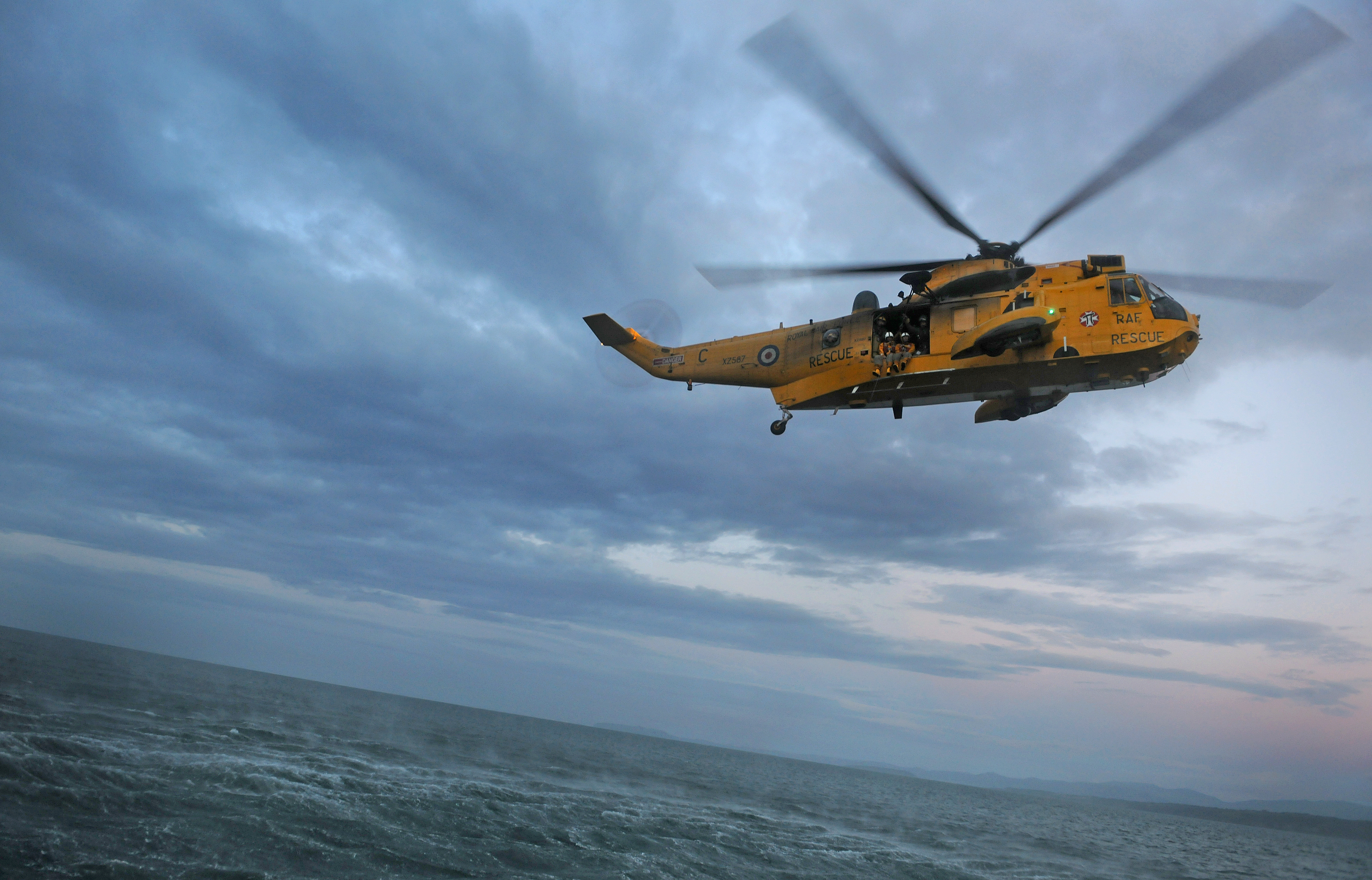
Piloting a Sea King helicopter in 2010

As part of his training across all branches of the military in 2008 and 2009, William spent up to six weeks with the Special Air Service, the Special Boat Service, and the Special Reconnaissance Regiment. In January 2009, he transferred his commission to the RAF and was promoted to Flight Lieutenant. He trained to become a helicopter pilot with the RAF's Search and Rescue Force. In January 2010, he graduated from the Defence Helicopter Flying School at RAF Shawbury. Later that month, he transferred to the Search and Rescue Training Unit at RAF Valley, Anglesey, to train on the Sea King search-and-rescue helicopter, graduating in September 2010. This made him the first member of the British royal family since Henry VII to live in Wales.

William's first rescue mission as co-pilot of an RAF Sea King came in October 2010, responding to an emergency call from Liverpool Coastguard. In November 2011, he took part in a search‑and‑rescue operation involving a sinking cargo ship in the Irish Sea, helping to rescue two sailors. From February to March 2012, he was deployed to the Falkland Islands for a six-week tour with No. 1564 Flight. The Argentine government condemned the deployment, close to the 30th anniversary of the start of the Falklands War, as a "provocative act". In June 2012, he qualified to serve as captain, or pilot in command of a Sea King rather than as a co-pilot. His active service as an RAF search-and-rescue pilot ended in September 2013. Over the course of his service, he conducted 156 search-and-rescue operations, during which 149 people were rescued. He later became patron of the Battle of Britain Memorial Flight.

In July 2015, William began working full-time as a pilot with the East Anglian Air Ambulance (EAAA), based at Cambridge Airport, which he described as a natural progression from his previous search‑and‑rescue role. He donated his full salary to the EAAA charity. He required a civil pilot's licence and further training before beginning the role, completing part of his training at Norwich Airport. William spoke about working irregular shifts and dealing largely with critical-care cases, and later discussed the impact of witnessing trauma and bereavement on his mental health and personal life. The BBC reported that he had been "exposed to the National Health Service in a way that no other senior royal has been or possibly ever will be."

William left his position with EAAA in July 2017 to assume full-time royal duties. After supporting an anniversary campaign for London's Air Ambulance Charity in 2019, he became the charity's official patron in March 2020. In May 2020, he granted permission for the charity to use Kensington Palace's private lawn as a refuelling point during the COVID-19 pandemic. In February 2023, he became patron of the Wales Air Ambulance charity. In December 2025, he became patron of the Special Air Service Regimental Association. In a guest-edited issue of Country Life released in November 2026, William spoke out about the treatment of women in the British Armed Forces, warning that the military was falling short of the standards needed to make servicewomen feel safe, respected and valued. His comments came after a series of year-long private and public meetings with servicewomen of all ranks across the armed forces, as well as discussions with senior leaders across the defence sector.

== Personal life ==
=== Relationship with Catherine Middleton ===
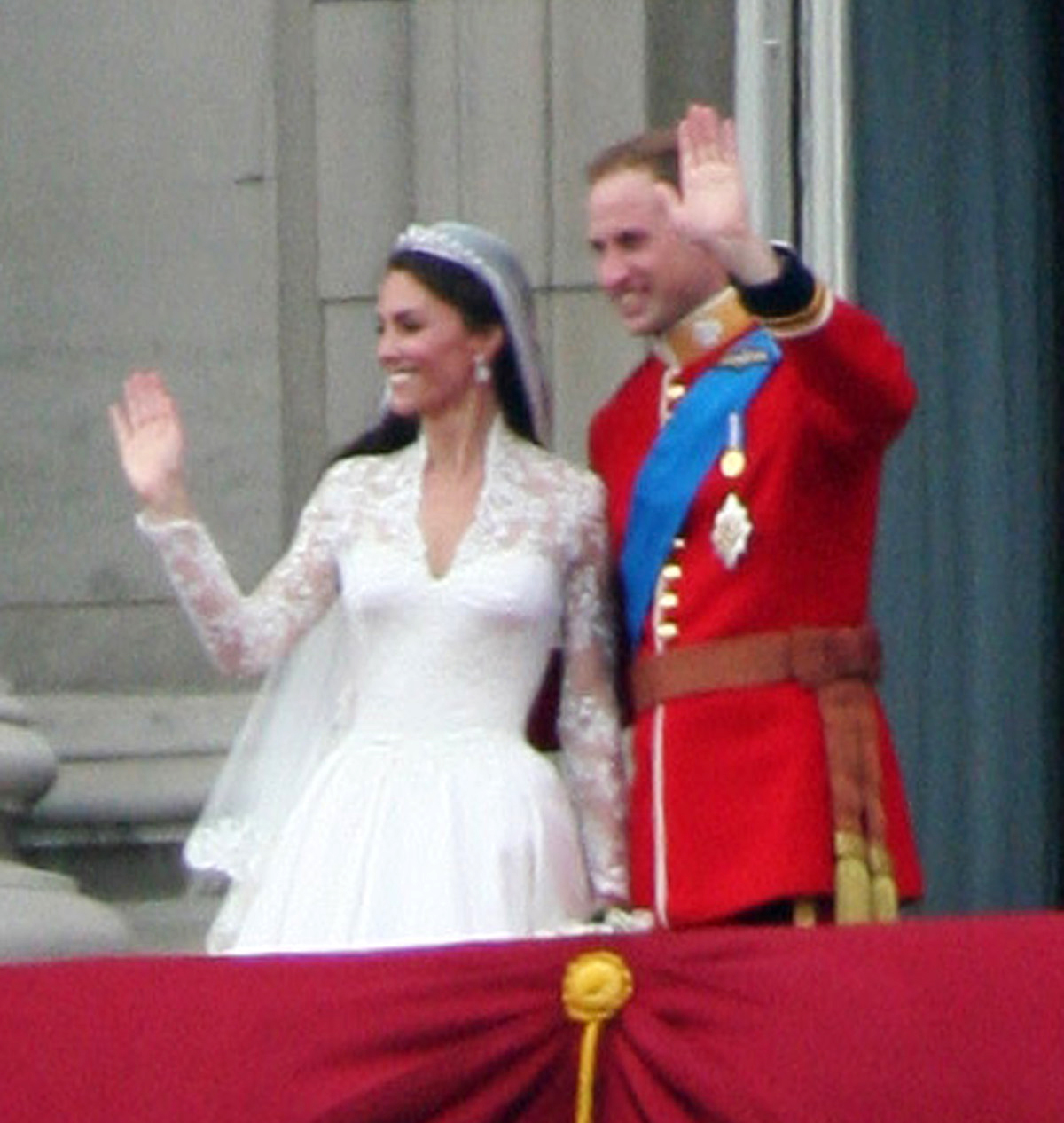
With Catherine on the Buckingham Palace balcony on their wedding day

In 2001, William met Catherine Middleton, while they were students in residence at St Salvator's Hall at the University of St Andrews, and they became close friends. She reportedly caught William's attention at a charity fashion show at the university in 2002. During their second year, William shared a flat with Middleton and two other friends. The couple began dating in 2003. From 2003 to 2005, they both lived at Balgove House on the Strathtyrum estate with two flatmates. They also began staying at a cottage on the Balmoral estate known as Tam-Na-Ghar, which had been given to William by the Queen Mother shortly before her death. The property has remained a private retreat for the couple in subsequent years. In 2004, the couple briefly separated but reconciled soon afterwards.

The relationship was followed closely by the tabloid press. Media attention became so intense that William asked the press to keep their distance from Middleton. In December 2006, Middleton and her family attended William's passing-out parade at the Royal Military Academy Sandhurst. In April 2007, William and Middleton were reported to have separated. Middleton and her family attended the Concert for Diana three months later; the couple were subsequently reported to have "rekindled their relationship". She also attended the Order of the Garter procession at Windsor Castle in June 2008, when William was made a Royal Knight of the Garter. In June 2010, the couple moved into a cottage on the Bodorgan Estate in Anglesey, Wales, where they lived until 2014.

=== Marriage and children ===
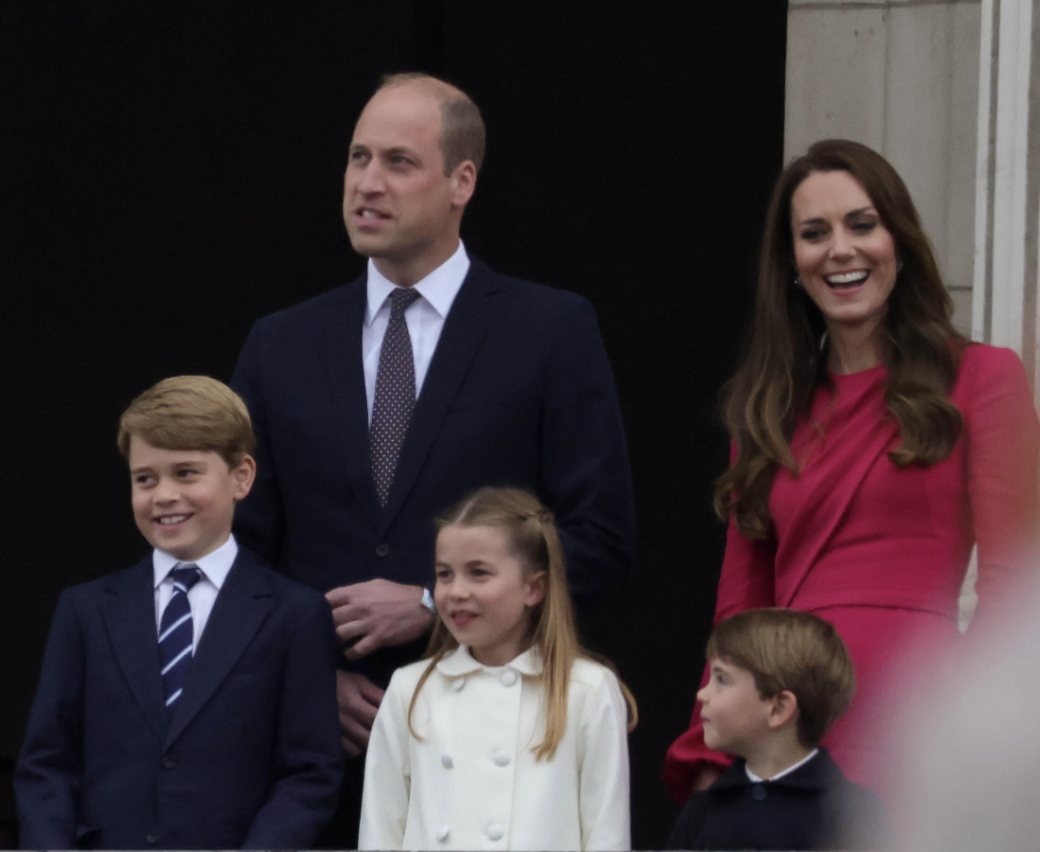
With Catherine and their children at Elizabeth II's Platinum Jubilee in 2022

The couple became engaged in October 2010 at a remote alpine cabin on Mount Kenya during a 10-day trip to the Lewa Wildlife Conservancy to celebrate William's completion of the RAF helicopter search-and-rescue course. Clarence House announced their engagement on 16 November. William gave his fiancée his mother's engagement ring. The wedding took place at Westminster Abbey on 29 April 2011. The global audience for the ceremony was estimated at around 300 million, while 26 million watched the event live in Britain alone.

William and Catherine have three children: Prince George, born in July 2013; Princess Charlotte, born in May 2015; and Prince Louis, born in April 2018; all three were born at St Mary's Hospital in London. They owned an English Cocker Spaniel, Lupo, who died in 2020, and now have Orla and one of her puppies, Otto, both of the same breed.

William and Catherine used Nottingham Cottage as their London residence until 2013, when £4.5 million of renovations to Apartment 1A at Kensington Palace were completed; it remains their official residence in the capital. The couple were given the country house Anmer Hall on the Sandringham estate as a wedding gift from the Queen, and lived there from 2015 to 2017. Kensington Palace was their primary residence until 2022, and Adelaide Cottage in Windsor until October 2025. Forest Lodge is their current residence.

Among William's godchildren are Prince Constantine-Alexios of Greece and Denmark and Lady Cosima Grosvenor, daughter of the 7th Duke of Westminster.

== Duke of Cambridge ==
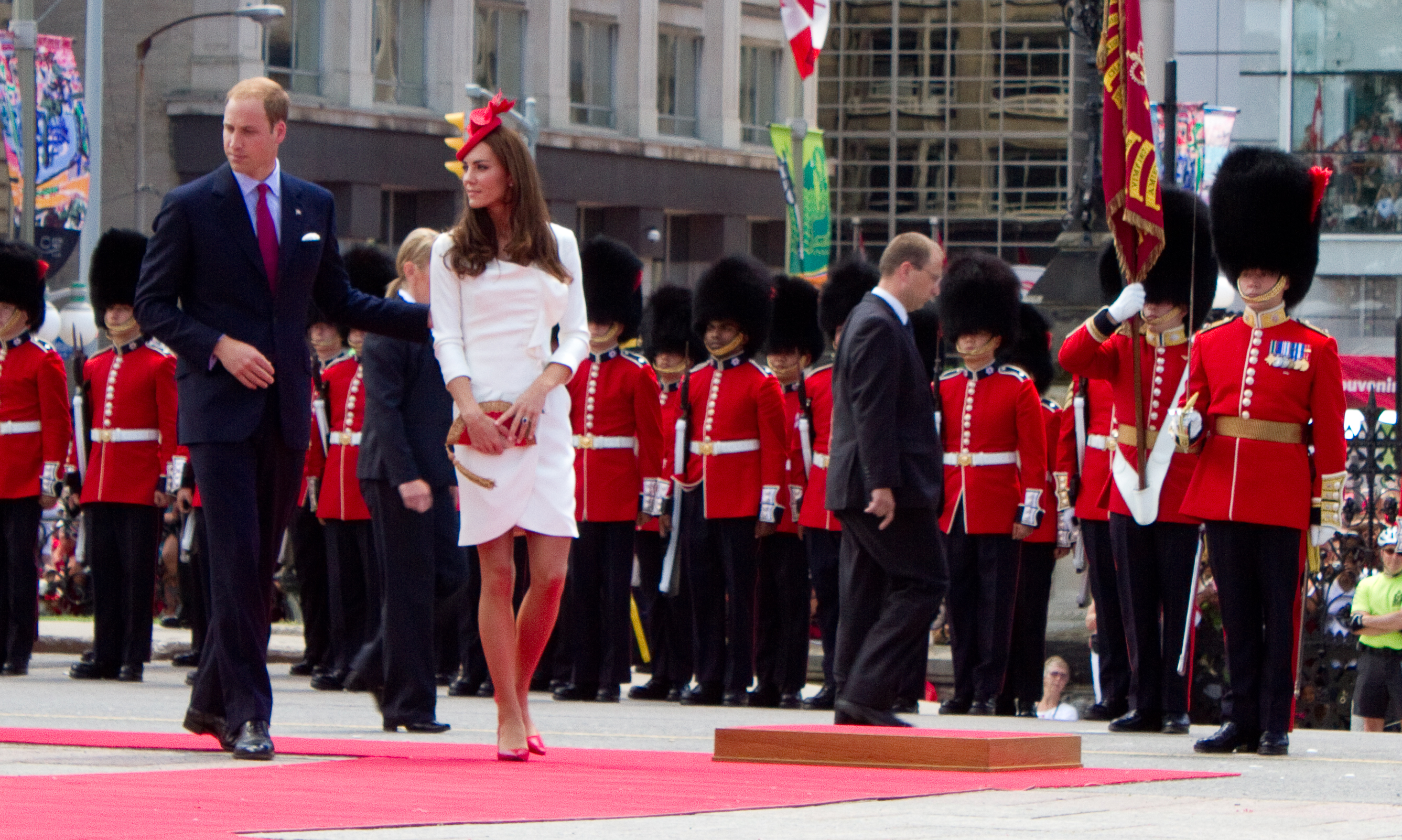
With Catherine at the Canada Day celebration in 2011 during their first tour outside the United Kingdom

William was created Duke of Cambridge, Earl of Strathearn, and Baron Carrickfergus on the day of his wedding in April 2011. He and Catherine toured Canada that summer. Nicholas Witchell, writing for BBC News, described the tour as an "unqualified success", noting that the couple's relaxed approach – from tree planting to street hockey – charmed the public and bolstered support for the monarchy. The couple served as ambassadors for the 2012 Summer Olympics in London, attending several sporting events throughout the games. In September 2012, William and Catherine visited Singapore, Malaysia, Tuvalu, and the Solomon Islands as part of the Queen's Diamond Jubilee celebrations. They made their first visit to Cambridge as Duke and Duchess in November that year.

William hosted his first investiture ceremony at Buckingham Palace in October 2013. In April 2014, he and Catherine undertook a royal tour of New Zealand and Australia, accompanied by their son George. In August that year, the couple, along with Harry, represented the royal family at World War I commemorations in Belgium. In December, the couple visited New York and Washington DC, where William delivered a speech at the World Bank condemning the illegal wildlife trade.

In 2015 and 2016, William visited several Asian countries, including Japan, China, Bhutan, and India; he was the first royal to visit mainland China in almost three decades, with the press describing his diplomacy as "deft" and "polished". Responding to media allegations that he was "work-shy", he emphasised his commitment to his duties, highlighting his dedication to fatherhood and his air‑ambulance work. In 2017, William and Catherine visited France, Poland, Germany, and Belgium. In January 2018, the couple visited Sweden and Norway. These visits, like others, were undertaken at the request of the Foreign Office and were interpreted as supporting UK-European relations in the post-Brexit context. In June 2018, William toured Jordan, Israel, and Palestine. While in Jerusalem, he visited the crypt of his great-grandmother Princess Alice.

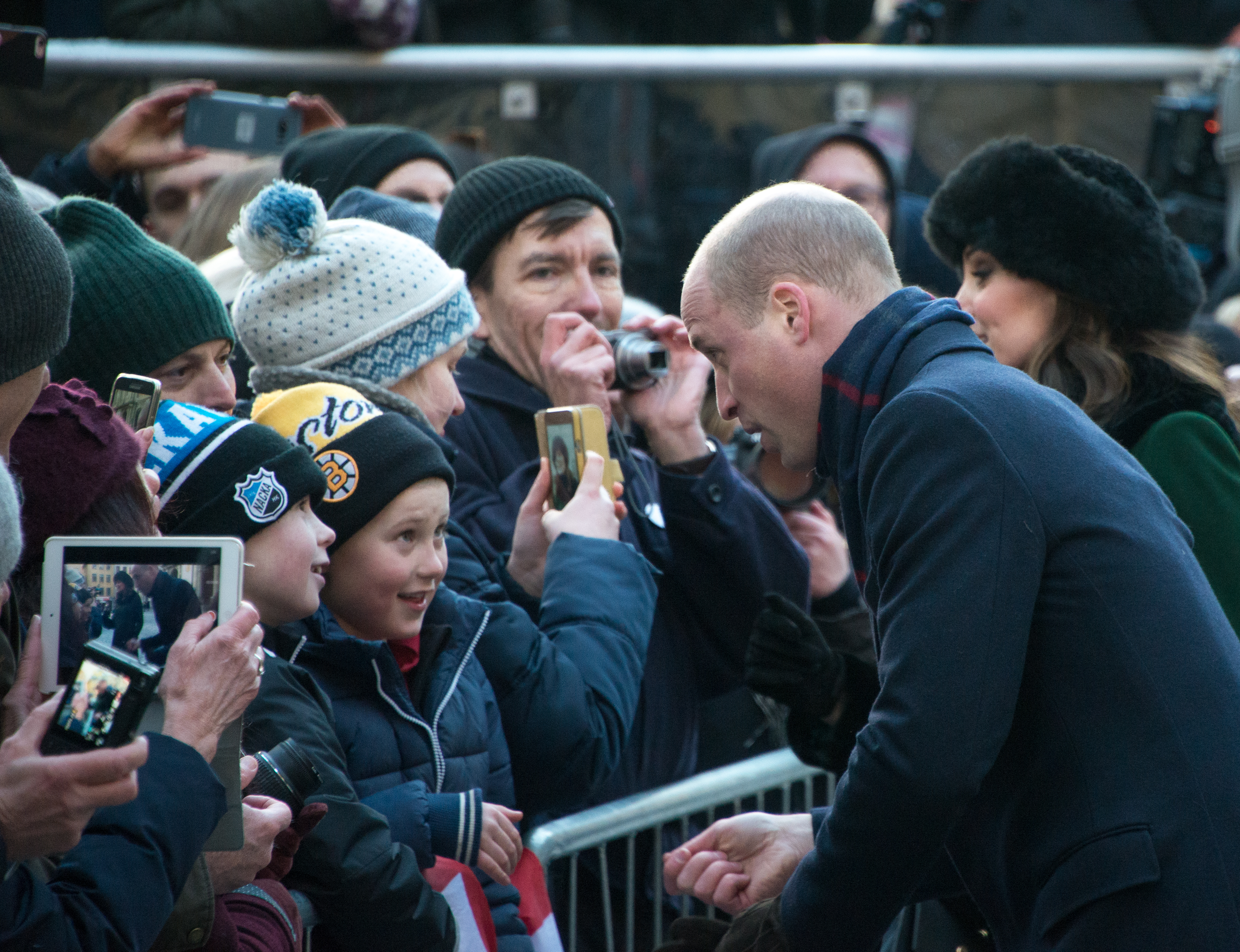
With Catherine greeting members of the public on their visit to Sweden in 2018

William and Catherine toured Pakistan in October 2019, marking the royal family's first visit to the country in 13 years. The tour was widely regarded as a success, strengthening diplomatic relations while reflecting the couple's personal interests in climate change and the importance of quality education. In November 2020, it was reported that William had tested positive for COVID‑19 in April but had chosen not to alert the media to "avoid alarming the nation". The Daily Telegraph reported that he had been "very ill" and had isolated away from his family, while other sources said he had not been seriously ill, had not been bedridden, and had continued working for most of the time. In December that year, the couple embarked on a tour of England, Scotland, and Wales via the British Royal Train "to pay tribute to the inspiring work" of communities and charities in 2020. Boris Johnson expressed his support, while Scottish first minister Nicola Sturgeon criticised the tour, citing travel restrictions; local governments were consulted during planning.

In his capacity as Lord High Commissioner to the General Assembly of the Church of Scotland, William toured the country with Catherine in May 2021. The couple attended the G7 summit for the first time in June 2021 in Cornwall. In March 2022, they undertook a tour of Belize, the Bahamas, and Jamaica as part of the Queen's Platinum Jubilee celebrations. Calls for reparations for slavery were a major theme among protesters during the visit. At the unveiling of the National Windrush Monument in London, William described the tour as "an opportunity to reflect" and condemned the racism experienced by members of the Windrush generation and British minorities in 2022. In May 2022, he attended the State Opening of Parliament for the first time as a counsellor of state, at which his father delivered the Queen's Speech on behalf of Elizabeth II.

== Prince of Wales ==
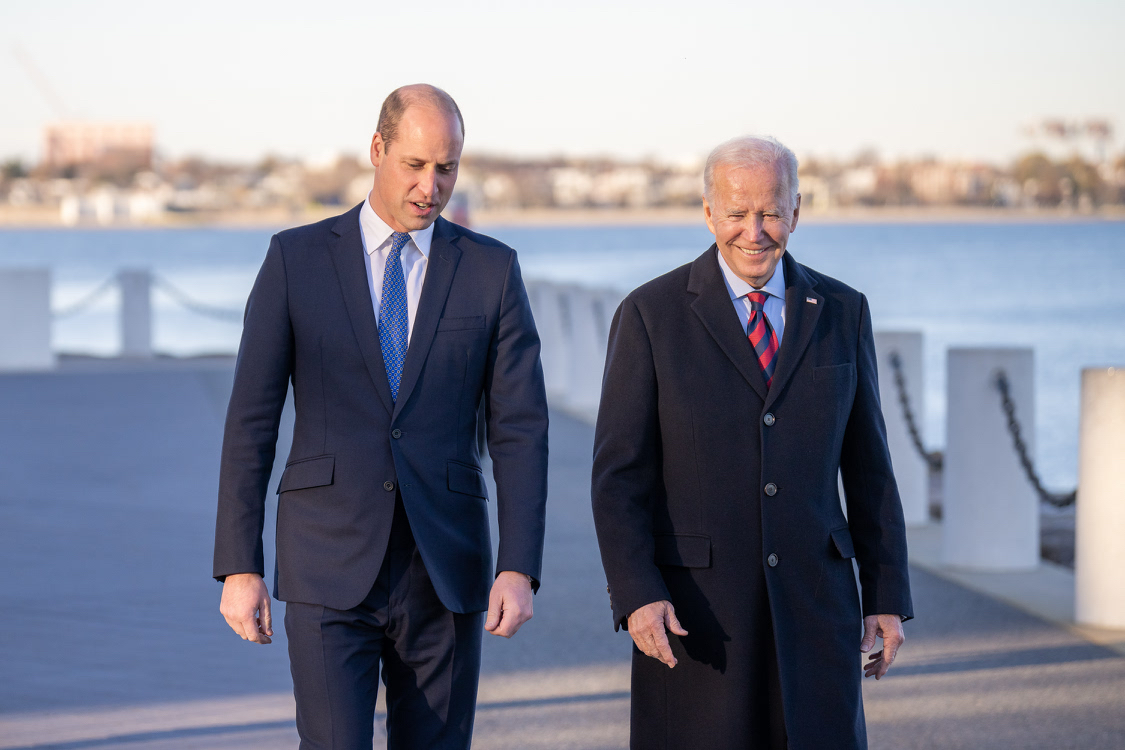
With Joe Biden in Boston, December 2022

Queen Elizabeth II died on 8 September 2022, and William's father succeeded as King Charles III. William, now heir apparent, was created Prince of Wales by his father on 9 September. The title became a subject of public debate in Wales. Senedd Llywydd Elin Jones stated that an investiture was not constitutionally required and likely unnecessary, a view echoed by Kensington Palace, which said it was "not on the table".

William and Catherine visited Anglesey and Swansea on 27 September 2022, marking their first visit to Wales since becoming Prince and Princess of Wales. In February 2023, they visited Falmouth, their first visit to the region since becoming Duke and Duchess of Cornwall. In October, William and Catherine condemned the October 7 attacks on Israel. In February 2024, William visited the British Red Cross headquarters, met aid workers assisting civilians in the Gaza–Israel conflict, and issued a government-approved call to end the fighting. Later that month, he withdrew at the last moment from the thanksgiving service for his godfather, Constantine II of Greece, due to an undisclosed "personal matter".

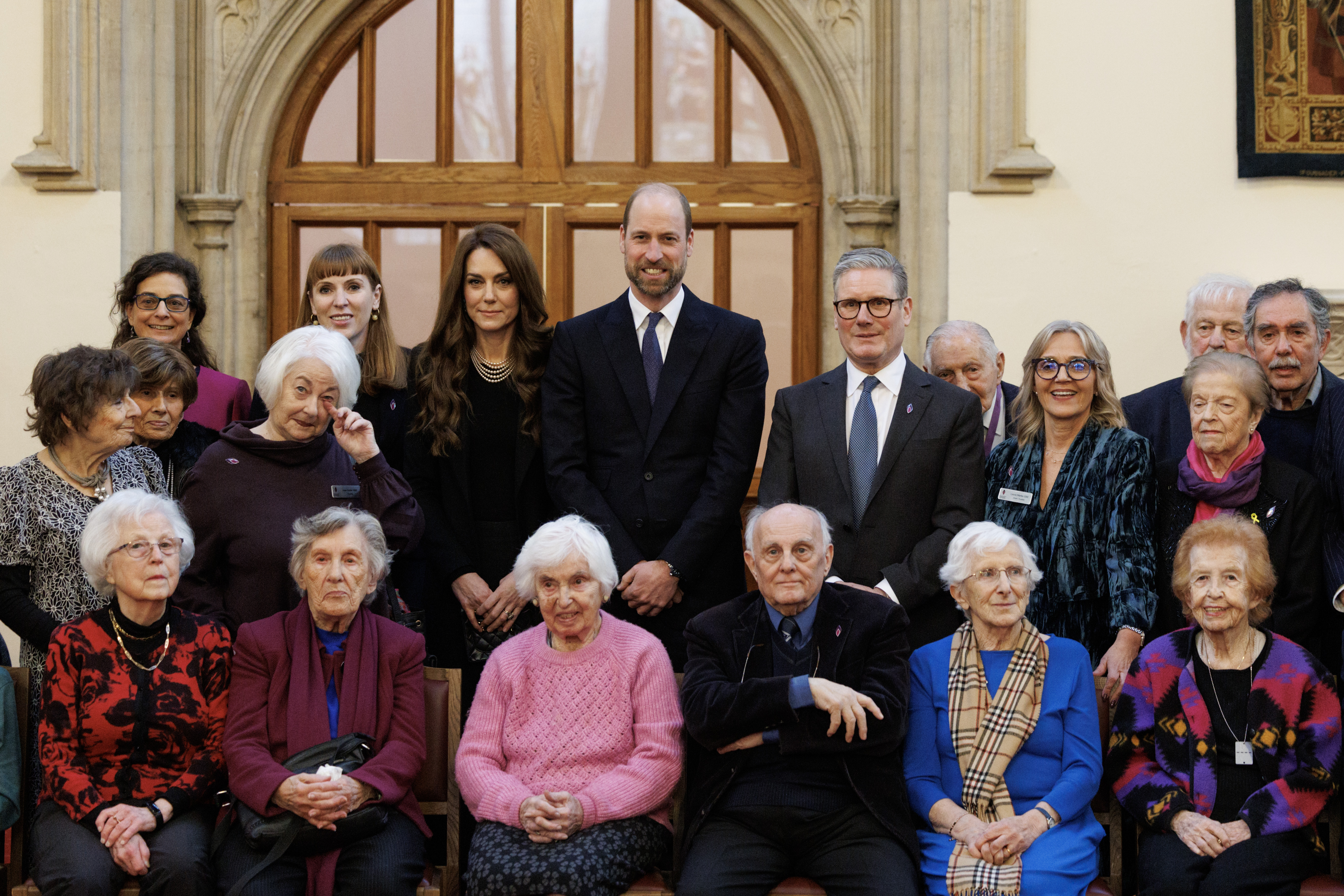
With Catherine and Keir Starmer at a Holocaust Memorial Day ceremony, January 2025

In December 2024, William attended the official reopening of the Notre-Dame cathedral in Paris, where he greeted the president-elect of the United States, Donald Trump, and later held a private meeting with him to discuss UK-US relations. In April 2025, William attended the funeral of Pope Francis on behalf of his father. In October, he appeared on the Apple TV+ series The Reluctant Traveler, which commentators described as his "most open and authentic" interview, in which he discussed his family life and the need for the monarchy to remain "fit for purpose". On 6 November that year, William attended the 2025 United Nations Climate Change Conference in Belém in place of Charles III; The Daily Telegraph described his address as "his highest-profile speech to date". In September 2026, he attended the funeral of King Harald V on behalf of his father. The same month, William and Catherine made their first official visit to the Isle of Bute and the town of Rothesay as Duke and Duchess of Rothesay.

As the eldest son of the British monarch, William inherited the Duchy of Cornwall, a private estate valued at about £1.3 billion that was established in 1337 to provide an income for the heir apparent. In his first full year as Duke of Cornwall, the duchy generated £23.6 million for him. It was further reported that around 20% of the duchy estate would be sold by 2040, with William planning to invest £500 million – funded through land sales, development income, partnerships, and borrowing – towards housing and environmental initiatives. In June 2026, William revealed that he had paid £8.34 million in tax for the 2023–24 financial year and £7.76 million for 2024–25. In September 2026, as part of the duchy's £500 million investment, he unveiled the Princetown Community Fund, which provides at least £250,000 to support locally led social, economic and environmental projects in Princetown.

Following his 2022 tour of Belize, the Bahamas and Jamaica, William suggested that he might not lead the Commonwealth when he became king, saying: "Who the Commonwealth chooses to lead its family in the future isn't what is on my mind." In October 2026, The Times reported that his position had not changed.

== Charity work ==
William became aware of HIV/AIDS in the mid-1990s when he accompanied his mother and brother on visits to shelters and clinics for patients. In January 2005, he and Harry volunteered at a British Red Cross aid distribution centre to pack emergency supplies for countries affected by the 2004 Boxing Day tsunami. That December, William spent two weeks in North Wales with Mountain Rescue England and Wales (MREW). In May 2007, he became patron of MREW and president of the Royal Marsden Hospital, the latter a role previously held by his mother. In January 2025, William was announced as the hospital's joint royal patron alongside Catherine.

In July 2007, William and Harry organised the Concert for Diana in memory of their mother, benefiting the charities and patronages of Diana, William, and Harry. In October 2008, the brothers undertook the eight-day, 1,000‑mile Enduro Africa motorbike ride across South Africa to raise money for Sentebale, UNICEF, and the Nelson Mandela Children's Fund. In 2010, William became a patron of 100 Women in Hedge Funds' philanthropic initiatives for the following three years. The same year, he succeeded Lord Attenborough as the fifth president of the British Academy of Film and Television Arts (BAFTA). BAFTA has since established the Prince William BAFTA Bursary to support junior creatives in the UK with costs needed to progress in film, television, or games. In March 2011, he and Catherine set up a gift fund through The Foundation of Prince William and Prince Harry to allow well‑wishers to donate to charities supporting the armed forces, children, the elderly, art, sport, and conservation in lieu of wedding gifts. The foundation was renamed The Royal Foundation of The Prince and Princess of Wales in September 2022.

In 2011 and 2015, William served as patron of British Army officer Henry Worsley's second and third expeditions to the South Pole, the latter raising money for the Endeavour Fund. In 2026, he became patron of the Onwards Expedition, in which Worsley's son, Max, and Norwegian adventurer Martin Nesse will undertake an expedition to the South Pole to raise funds for the Earthshot Prize and the British Exploring Society.

=== Humanitarian causes ===
In March 2020, William appeared in a video for the National Emergencies Trust, launching a fundraising appeal to support charities during the COVID‑19 pandemic. In April, he officially became patron of the organisation.

In December 2020, William and Catherine became joint patrons of NHS Charities Together. In February 2021, he visited a vaccination centre in King's Lynn and later encouraged vaccine uptake, denouncing false information that could cause vaccine hesitancy. In September that year, he reportedly helped evacuate a Sandhurst-trained Afghan officer and his family from Kabul during the 2021 Taliban offensive. In March 2022, amid the Russian invasion of Ukraine, William and Catherine made a donation to support refugees. In February 2023, they donated to the Disasters Emergency Committee (DEC) to support victims of the 2023 Turkey–Syria earthquake. In July 2023, William became patron of the appeal to launch The Fleming Centre, aimed at driving a global movement to tackle antimicrobial resistance. In July 2024, he and Catherine made donations to support victims of Hurricane Beryl. In January 2025, William was announced as patron of the College of Paramedics.

=== Conservation ===
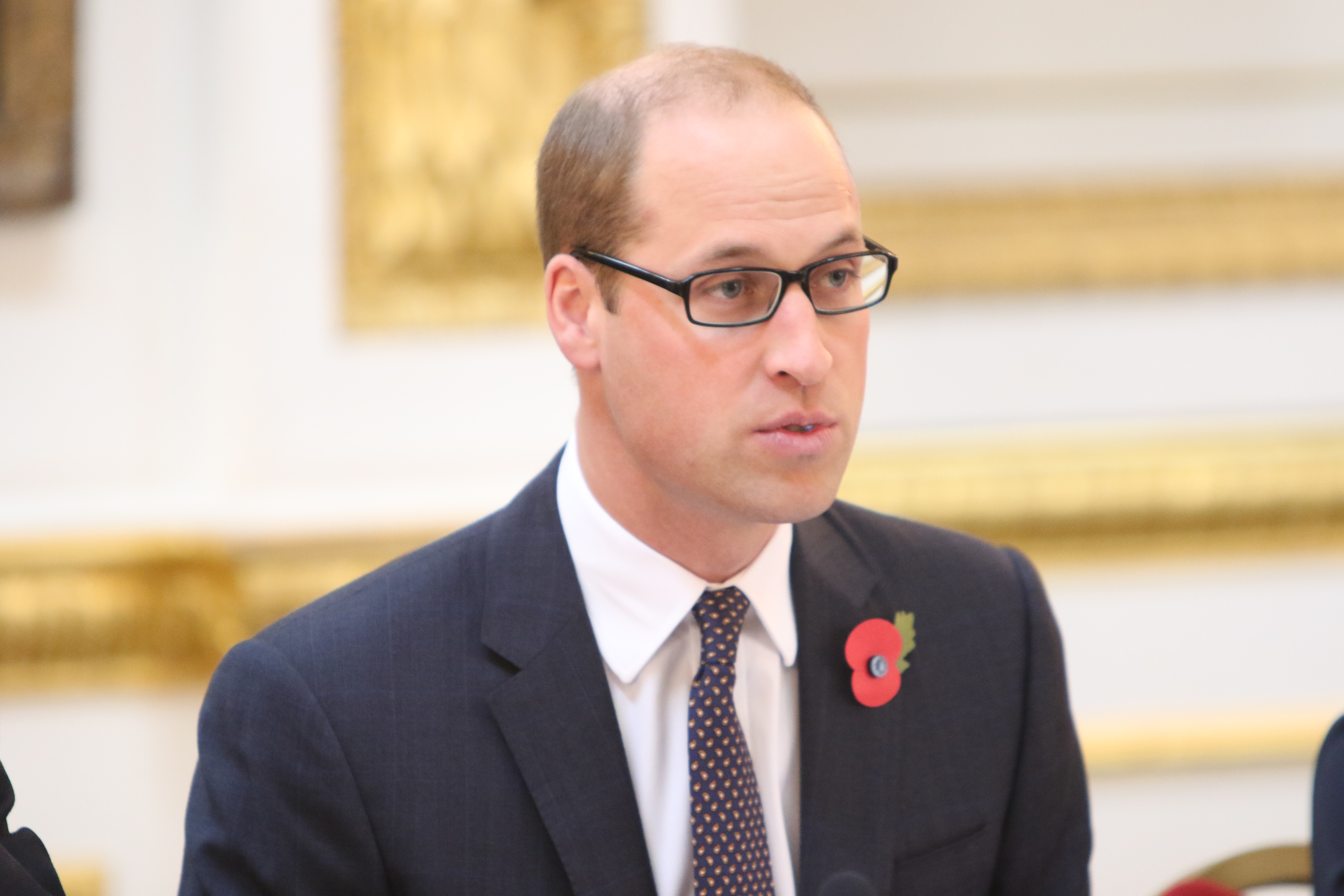
At a United for Wildlife Taskforce meeting at Buckingham Palace, 2017

William became patron of the Tusk Trust in December 2005, a charity that works to conserve wildlife and support community development across Africa. He carried out his first official duty with the Trust in April 2008 by launching a 5,000-mile (8,000 km) bike ride across the African continent. He later helped launch the Tusk Conservation Awards, presented annually since 2013 to recognise environmental activists. In June 2010, he and his brother visited Botswana, Lesotho, and South Africa, undertaking projects relating to wildlife, sport, and young children. In 2013, he succeeded his grandfather the Duke of Edinburgh as president of Fields in Trust and became patron in 2024. He established the United for Wildlife Transport Taskforce in December 2014 to reduce the global illegal wildlife trade. In 2014, Jane Goodall stated that William had expressed the view that all ivory in the royal collection should be destroyed. William has occasionally commented on the effects of overpopulation on African wildlife, though his remarks have been criticised for not addressing resource consumption and population density.

After two years of research, William launched the Earthshot Prize in October 2020, designed to provide funding and incentives for environmental solutions over the following decade. He subsequently delivered a TED Talk on environmental protection and conservation as part of the TED Countdown climate‑change initiative. Later that month, he assumed the patronages of Fauna and Flora International and the British Trust for Ornithology, passed on from his grandparents. He also appeared in an ITV documentary, Prince William: A Planet For Us All, discussing environmental issues.

In 2021, William made a private donation to the Thin Green Line Foundation, which provides grants to the families of conservation rangers killed while protecting wildlife. In July 2022, he condemned the murder of South African park ranger Anton Mzimba and called for those responsible to "be brought to justice". William has advocated for stricter penalties for poachers and wildlife traffickers, having spoken at the Illegal Wildlife Trade Conference in 2018 and supported a 2022 US court sentencing of a man responsible for trafficking rhinoceros horns and elephant ivory.

=== LGBT rights ===
William has spoken in support of LGBT rights as part of his work against cyberbullying, emphasising the importance of being "proud of the person you are" and highlighting the effects of online abuse and discrimination. In 2016, he appeared in the July issue of Attitude, becoming the first member of the royal family to feature on the cover of a gay magazine. He was recognised at the British LGBT Awards in May 2017. In June 2023, William hosted a Pride Month discussion with mental‑health charity volunteers at Royal Vauxhall Tavern.

=== Mental health ===
Since 2009, William has been patron of Child Bereavement UK, which supports children and families who have lost a loved one. In 2016, the Royal Foundation launched several mental‑health initiatives, including Heads Together, a campaign led by William, Catherine, and Harry to destigmatise mental health. Legacy programmes include Mental Health at Work, launched in September 2018 to improve workplace mental‑health approaches, and Heads Up, launched in May 2019 with the Football Association to encourage conversations about mental health among adults. Later that month, William and Catherine, together with Harry and his wife Meghan, launched Shout, the United Kingdom's first 24/7 text-messaging service for people experiencing mental‑health crises. William later volunteered on the crisis helpline during the COVID-19 lockdowns. He attributes his interest in mental health to his experiences as an air‑ambulance pilot, his work with the homeless, veterans' welfare, and Catherine's anti‑addiction advocacy.

In March 2020, William and Catherine began supporting a new mental‑health initiative by Public Health England during the COVID‑19 pandemic. In April 2020, they announced Our Frontline, which provided mental health support to emergency medical workers. In September 2020, William established the Emergency Responders Senior Leaders Board, commissioned by the Royal Foundation to research the mental health and wellbeing of emergency responders, in partnership with King's College London and the Open University. In May 2021 and 2022, William and Catherine voiced the Mental Health Minute message, broadcast on every UK radio station, encouraging people to support those experiencing loneliness. In October 2022, to mark World Mental Health Day, the couple took over Newsbeat and interviewed four guests on mental‑health topics. In September 2023, William unveiled two organisations partnering with the Duchy of Cornwall to improve mental wellbeing and provide mental‑health services for its tenants. In October 2023, to mark World Mental Health Day, he and Catherine took part in a youth forum in Birmingham, Exploring our Emotional Worlds, alongside BBC Radio 1 and the charity The Mix. In May 2024, he announced a three‑year funding package for the charity We Are Farming Minds to support mental health among farmers on Duchy of Cornwall land. In December 2024, he and Catherine jointly funded a pilot scheme with Norfolk and Waveney Mind to support rural and farming communities on the Sandringham estate. In March 2025, William was announced as patron of We Are Farming Minds. In September 2026, he launched On Your Side, a nationwide initiative encouraging sport to incorporate suicide prevention measures into its culture.

=== Homelessness ===
In September 2005, William became patron of Centrepoint, a charity assisting homeless young people. In December 2009, as part of a Centrepoint‑organised event, he spent the night in a sleeping bag near Blackfriars Bridge to raise awareness of youth homelessness. He opened the charity's new facility, Apprenticeship House, in November 2019 to mark its 50th anniversary.

William has been patron of The Passage since 2019, having first visited the centre in 1993 with his mother. In October 2020, he wrote the introduction to the organisation's 40th‑anniversary fundraising cookbook, highlighting the importance of supporting homeless people during the COVID‑19 pandemic. In December that year, he volunteered at the charity to prepare donation bags for homeless residents in emergency hotel accommodation and spoke with residents about their experiences. In 2022 and 2023, he was seen selling copies of The Big Issue, typically sold by homeless and unemployed people to earn income.

In June 2023, William launched Homewards after two years of development, aiming to end homelessness in the United Kingdom. The five‑year initiative focuses on six pilot locations, each receiving initial seed funding from the Royal Foundation and working with private‑sector and grassroots charity partners. The project emphasises early intervention and providing housing to families before addressing related issues such as abuse or joblessness. In February 2024, William, in partnership with the Cornish charity St Petrocs, announced plans to build 24 homes on Duchy of Cornwall land in Nansledan to provide temporary accommodation for people experiencing homelessness. Plans also include constructing more than 400 social‑rented homes and a further 475 affordable dwellings in South East Faversham.

=== Sport ===
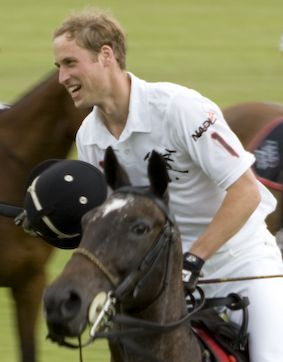
Playing polo at Sandhurst in 2007

William often plays polo to raise money for charity. He is a football fan and supports the English club Aston Villa. He became president of England's Football Association (FA) in May 2006 and vice-royal patron of the Welsh Rugby Union (WRU) in February 2007, supporting the Queen as patron. That same year, the WRU's decision to name the Prince William Cup drew criticism from those who believed it would have been more appropriate to name it after Ray Gravell. William became patron of the WRU and the FA in 2016 and 2024, respectively.

In December 2010, William, alongside David Cameron, attended a meeting with FIFA vice-president Chung Mong-joon, during which Chung suggested a vote‑trading deal for England's 2018 World Cup bid. The English delegation reported the suggestion to FIFA, considering it a violation of anti‑collusion rule. In 2011, William, as president of the FA, voted against Australia's 2022 FIFA bid and instead supported South Korea, despite being Australia's future heir. In 2020, he voted against the joint Australia–New Zealand 2023 FIFA Women's World Cup bid and instead voted for Colombia.

In February 2021, following an investigation into racist abuse directed at Marcus Rashford, William released a statement as FA president denouncing "racist abuse... whether on the pitch, in the stands, or on social media" as "despicable", adding that "we all have a responsibility" to create an environment of tolerance and accountability. In April, he criticised the planned breakaway competition, The Super League, saying he "share[d] the concerns of fans about the proposed Super League and the damage it risks causing to the game we love." In July, he condemned racist attacks against England football players following their loss in the UEFA Euro 2020 final.

In May 2007, William became patron of the English Schools' Swimming Association. In 2012, alongside Catherine and Harry, he launched Coach Core, a programme established after the 2012 Olympics to provide apprenticeship opportunities for aspiring professional coaches. In May 2020, he appeared in the BBC One Documentary Football, Prince William and Our Mental Health, part of a campaign encouraging men to discuss mental‑health issues using football as a shared medium.

Both William and Harry are enthusiastic motorcyclists; William has owned a Ducati 1198 S Corse. In May 2014, William, like his father and grandfather, became president of the British Sub-Aqua Club (BSAC). He also took part in a bandy event in Stockholm in January 2018.

In November 2022, William was criticised by Welsh football supporters and Welsh actor Michael Sheen for holding the Prince of Wales title while maintaining affiliations with the England national football team, particularly after he presented jerseys to the squad ahead of the 2022 FIFA World Cup, in which both Wales and England were placed in the same Group B. William commented that he had supported the England football team from a very young age but happily supported Welsh rugby union – of which he is patron – over England. In August 2023, he faced criticism in parts of the press and on social media for not attending the 2023 FIFA Women's World Cup final in Australia as FA president.

== Public image ==
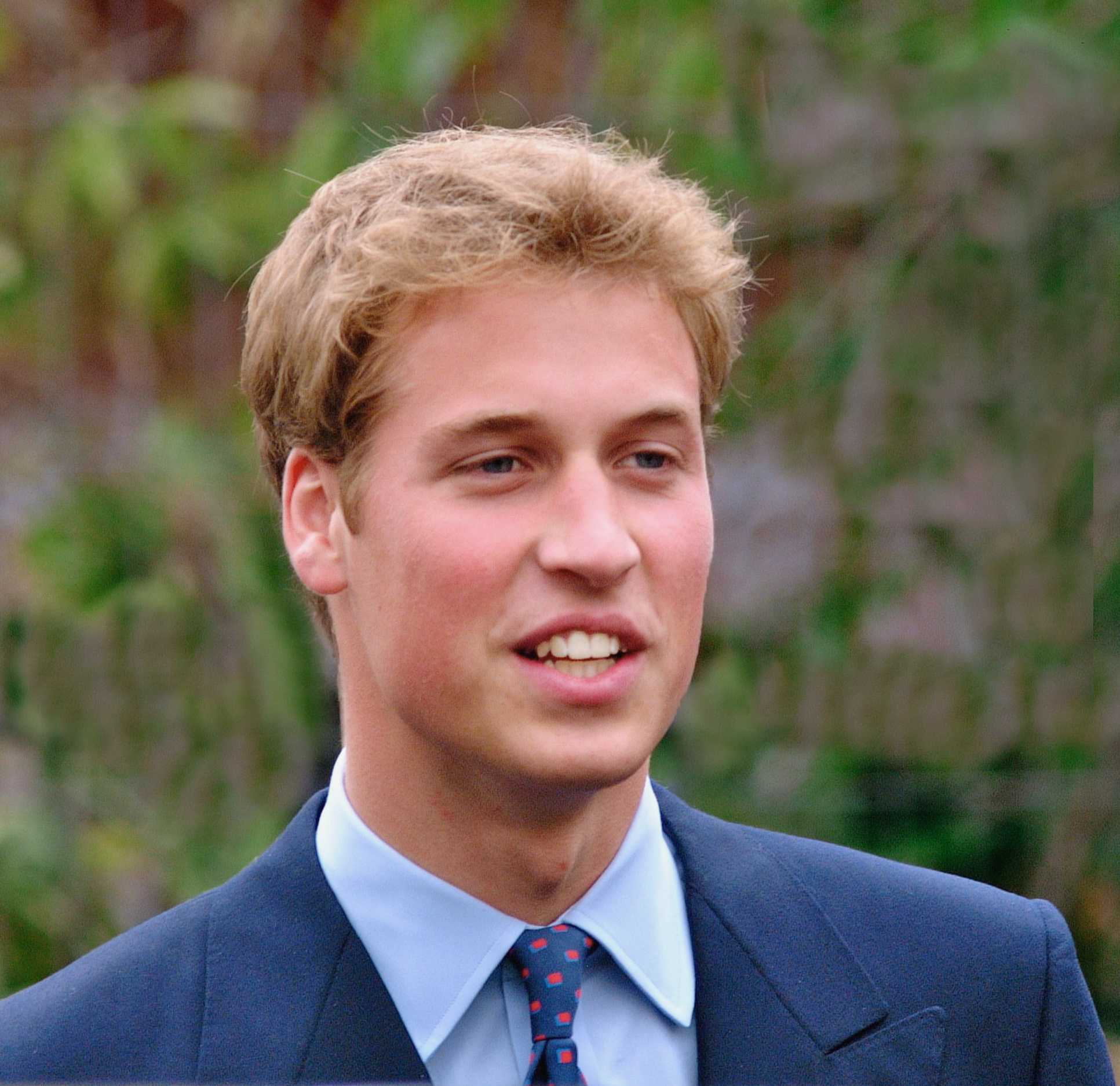
William in 2001

William has been one of the most popular members of the British royal family since his birth. Having lived a public life from infancy, he was regarded as a "heartthrob" and eligible young man in adulthood, a status often compared to that of his father. Ruth La Ferla of The New York Times contrasted William's "refined" and "polite" appeal with Leonardo DiCaprio's "bad-boy" popularity. Following his marriage, William's public image assumed a more "staid" and fatherly demeanour, having "settled into a stable domestic order".

Anne McElvoy has described William's public personality as a "genial presence" with a "tougher side", combined with elements of his mother's "inimitable style". Much of his royal work focuses on "big bet" projects, rather than "plaques and patronages". In a 2016 interview, William said his aim was to keep the royal family relevant over the next 20 years. William and Catherine's close partnership has been described by The Times as a "good double act", with both valuing normality, privacy, and control.

In 2011, Time magazine listed him as one of the most influential people in the world alongside his newlywed wife Catherine. In August 2023, Gallup, Inc. named him the most popular public figure in the United States after surveying public views on 15 prominent individuals. He was found to be the most popular member of the royal family by YouGov in December 2022 and September 2023, and the second most popular in April 2024. In December 2024, The Daily Telegraph included William in its annual list of best-dressed celebrities. In 2025, he was listed alongside Catherine on the inaugural Time 100 Philanthropy list; that year, the couple also topped Tatler's social power index. In 2026, William's role as founder of the Earthshot Prize was recognised in the Time 100 Climate list, which ranks the most influential climate action leaders.

== Privacy and the media ==
The death of Diana, Princess of Wales, while being chased by the paparazzi in 1997, has shaped William and Catherine's cautious approach to the media. They have repeatedly asked for privacy when off-duty.

In 2005, William spoke with ITV reporter Tom Bradby and concluded that it was likely their voicemails were being accessed. An investigation led by Deputy Assistant Commissioner Peter Clarke found that the compromised voicemail accounts belonged to William's aides, including Jamie Lowther-Pinkerton, rather than the prince himself. However, Clive Goodman later stated that he had hacked William's phone on 35 occasions. Andy Coulson, editor of News of the World from 2003 to 2007, apologised to William and his brother for invading their privacy, accepting "ultimate responsibility" for Goodman's actions. William later sued News Group Newspapers, publisher of News of the World and The Sun, resulting in an out-of-court settlement in 2020. He and Harry initially brought a private claim through mutual solicitors, though Harry later pursued his case separately with new representation.

At the time of Middleton's 25th birthday in January 2007, William issued a statement saying that the level of media intrusion had become intolerable. In October that year, he condemned the "aggressive pursuit" by photographers as the couple left a London nightclub. The Press Complaints Commission warned editors against publishing images obtained through harassment; the Daily Mail, Daily Mirror, and Daily Express complied, while The Sun published photographs taken before their car departed. In April 2009, William's lawyers secured an apology from the Daily Star over a false claim that he had "wrecked" a $2 million training aircraft.

In September 2012, the French edition of Closer and the Italian magazine Chi published topless photos of Catherine sunbathing at Château d'Autet. William and Catherine filed both a criminal complaint and a civil suit in Nanterre. A court granted an injunction banning further publication and launched a criminal inquiry. In 2017, Closer was fined €100,000, and its editor and owner €45,000 each.

In October 2014, William and Catherine issued a legal warning to a freelance photographer for "harassing and following" their son George and his nanny. In August 2015, Kensington Palace released a letter describing the media's "dangerous" attempts to photograph George and Charlotte.

In November 2016, William issued a statement supporting Harry and his girlfriend, Meghan Markle, following their complaints about press intrusion. During a visit to the BBC studios in central London in November 2018, William criticised social‑media companies for failing to address misinformation and for their role in fuelling social problems.

In June 2022, a three‑minute video of William confronting paparazzi photographer Terry Harris was posted on Harris's YouTube channel. Recorded in January 2021, it shows William objecting as Harris attempted to film his family during a bike ride near Anmer Hall. Kensington Palace described the video as a breach of privacy and requested its removal from public platforms.

In October 2025, Harry named William and Catherine in his court case against Associated Newspapers, alleging that private investigators had been employed to gather information about them, including a payment for details of William's 21st-birthday party in 2003. Later that month, William and Catherine won a privacy case in France against Paris Match over unauthorised photos during a family ski trip in the Alps.

== Titles, styles, and honours ==
=== Titles and styles ===
William has been a British prince since birth and was known as "His Royal Highness Prince William of Wales" until April 2011. He was created Duke of Cambridge, Earl of Strathearn, and Baron Carrickfergus by Elizabeth II on the day of his wedding. The letters patent granting these titles were issued on 26 May that year.

As the eldest son of the monarch, William automatically became Duke of Cornwall, Duke of Rothesay, Earl of Carrick, Baron of Renfrew, Lord of the Isles, and Prince and Great Steward of Scotland upon his father's accession on 8 September 2022. From 8 to 9 September, he was styled "His Royal Highness the Duke of Cornwall and Cambridge". On 9 September, Charles announced William's creation as Prince of Wales, the traditional title for the male heir apparent to the British monarch. William has since been known as "His Royal Highness the Prince of Wales", except in Scotland, where he is styled "His Royal Highness the Duke of Rothesay" instead. The letters patent formally granting him this title and that of Earl of Chester were issued on 13 February 2023.

=== Honours ===
William is a Royal Knight Companion of the Most Noble Order of the Garter (KG), an Extra Knight of the Most Ancient and Most Noble Order of the Thistle (KT), Great Master of the Most Honourable Order of the Bath (GCB), a member of the Privy Council of the United Kingdom (PC), and a Personal Aide-de-Camp (ADC) to the sovereign.

== Ancestry ==
William descends through his father from both the House of Windsor and the House of Oldenburg, one of Europe's oldest royal dynasties. More specifically, his Oldenburg line derives from the cadet branch known as the House of Glücksburg.

Through his mother, William descends from the Earls Spencer – a cadet branch of the Spencer family descended from the earls of Sunderland (the senior branch are now also dukes of Marlborough); from the Barons Fermoy; and, more distantly from Henry FitzRoy, 1st Duke of Grafton, and Charles Lennox, 1st Duke of Richmond – two illegitimate sons of King Charles II. As king, William would be the first monarch since the death of Anne in 1714 to descend undisputedly from Charles I, and the first to descend from Charles II.

William's matrilineal line traces back to Eliza Kewark, a housekeeper to his 18th‑century ancestor Theodore Forbes, a Scottish merchant working for the East India Company Surat. Contemporary documents variously describe her as "a dark-skinned native woman", "an Armenian woman from Bombay", and "Mrs. Forbesian". Genealogist William Addams Reitwiesner believed that Kewark was Armenian.

In June 2013, The Times published an article on a DNA company, BritainsDNA, which apparently tested two of William's distant matrilineal cousins and claimed that Kewark was matrilineally of Indian descent, based on a rare mtDNA haplotype.

== Bibliography ==
=== Book contributions ===
- "Preface", in: Hurd, Douglas (2015). Elizabeth II: The Steadfast. Allen Lane. ISBN 978-0-1419794-10.
- "Introduction", in: Butfield, Colin; Hughes, Jonnie (2021). Earthshot: How to Save Our Planet. John Murray. ISBN 978-1-5293886-26.
- "Foreword", in: Martell, Peter (2022). Flowers for Elephants: How a Conservation Movement in Kenya Offers Lessons for Us All. C. Hurst (Publishers) Limited. ISBN 978-1-7873869-38.
- "Foreword", in: GCHQ (2022). Puzzles for Spies. National Geographic Books. ISBN 978-0-2415799-09.
- "Foreword", in: Butfield, Colin; Hughes, Jonnie (2023). The Earthshot Prize: A Handbook for Dreamers and Thinkers: Solutions to Repair our Planet. Hachette Children's. ISBN 978-1-5263646-92.
- "Foreword", in: Kent-Payne, Vaughan (2024). They Also Served: 200 People Who Trained At Sandhurst. Sandhurst Trust. Archived from the original on 4 February 2024.
- "Foreword", in: Burrow, Lindsey (2025). Take Care: A Memoir of Love, Family and Never Giving Up. Century. ISBN 978-1-5299413-33.

=== Authored letters and articles ===
- The Duke of Cambridge (7 September 2020). "An open letter written by The Duke of Cambridge to mark Air Ambulance Week 2020". The Royal Family. Archived from the original on 16 August 2023.
- Prince William; Michael Bloomberg (28 September 2021). "We're in a race to save Earth from climate change". USA Today. Archived from the original on 16 August 2023.
- The Duke of Cambridge (20 June 2022). "Prince William: 'Why I wanted to work with The Big Issue'". The Big Issue. Archived from the original on 2 October 2023.
- Prince William (14 September 2026). "Prince William: This summer has shown the climate crisis is here. Now we must act". The Independent. Archived from the original on 14 September 2026.

=== Guest-editor ===
- "HRH The Prince of Wales: Guest Editor". Country Life. 11 November 2026.

== See also ==
- List of covers of Time magazine (1990s), (2010s)
- List of current British princes and princesses
- List of current heirs apparent
- List of heirs to the British throne
- William, Prince of Wales, in film and television

== Footnotes ==
William, Prince of Wales House of Windsor Born: 21 June 1982
Lines of succession
First Heir apparent	Succession to the British throne 1st in line	Followed by Prince George of Wales
British royalty
Vacant Title last held by Charles (III)	Prince of Wales; 2022–present	Incumbent; Presumed next holder: Prince George of Wales
Preceded by Charles (III)	Duke of Cornwall; Duke of Rothesay; 2022–present	Incumbent; Presumed next holder: Prince George of Wales
Peerage of the United Kingdom
Vacant 4th creation extinct in 1904 Title last held by Prince George	Duke of Cambridge; 5th creation 2011–present	Incumbent
Orders of precedence in the United Kingdom
Preceded by The King	Gentlemen; HRH The Prince of Wales	Followed by The Duke of Sussex
Cultural offices
Preceded by The Duke of York	President of The Football Association; 2006–present	Incumbent
Preceded by The Lord Attenborough	President of BAFTA; 2010–present	Incumbent
Honorary titles
Preceded by Sir Sebastian Roberts	Colonel of the Irish Guards; 2011–2022	Succeeded by The Princess of Wales
Preceded by The Prince of Wales	Colonel of the Welsh Guards; 2022–present	Incumbent
Vacant Title last held by The Prince of Wales	Great Master of the Order of the Bath; 2024–present	Incumbent
