= Colthurst =

Colthurst may refer to:

== Surname ==
- Bill Colthurst (1922–2009), Irish archdeacon
- David la Touche Colthurst (1828–1907), Irish politician
- Edmund Colthurst (1527–after 1611), English landowner
- Sir George Colthurst, 5th Baronet (1824–1878), Irish landowner and politician
- James Colthurst (born 1957), British radiologist
- John Colthurst (disambiguation), multiple people
- Matthew Colthurst (before 1517–1559), English MP
- Nicholas Colthurst (disambiguation), multiple people
- Sir Richard la Touche Colthurst, 9th Baronet (1928–2003), Irish baronet

== Other uses ==
- Colthurst, Virginia, United States
- Colthurst baronets, a title in the Baronetage of Ireland
