= John Colthurst =

John Colthurst may refer to:

- John Colthurst (1678–1756), MP for Tallow (Parliament of Ireland constituency) 1734–1756
- Sir John Colthurst, 1st Baronet (died 1775), MP for Castlemartyr, Youghal and Doneraile
- Sir John Conway Colthurst, 2nd Baronet (c. 1743–1787), of the Colthurst baronets

== See also ==
- Colthurst (disambiguation)
- John C. Bowen-Colthurst, Anglo-Irish soldier
