= Nicholas Colthurst =

Nicholas Colthurst may refer to:

- Sir Nicholas Colthurst, 3rd Baronet (died 1795), MP for Clonakilty and St Johnstown
- Sir Nicholas Colthurst, 4th Baronet (1789–1829), MP for Cork City

== See also ==
- Colthurst (disambiguation)
