= Diana: Her True Story =

Diana: Her True Story may refer to:

- Diana: Her True Story (book), a 1992 book by Andrew Morton
- Diana: Her True Story (film), a 1993 film based on Morton's book
