= William & Catherine: The Intimate Inside Story =

2026 biography by Russell Myers

- First edition
- Author: Russell Myers
- Language: English
- Subject: William, Prince of Wales; Catherine, Princess of Wales
- Genre: Biography
- Publisher: Ebury Publishing
- Publication date: 26 February 2026
- Publication place: United Kingdom
- Media type: Print
- Pages: 304
- ISBN: 978-1529985016

William & Catherine: The Intimate Inside Story is a 2026 biography by Russell Myers. The book discusses the relationship between William, Prince of Wales, and Catherine, Princess of Wales over the years. It has been reported as the first joint biography of the couple in more than a decade.

The book, Myers's first, was announced on X, where he confirmed it would be published on 26 February 2026.

== Content ==
The biography recounts the different stages of the relationship between Prince William and Catherine. It also includes reports on the influence of Queen Elizabeth II in their reconciliation after their 2007 breakup.

Catherine's adjustment to royal life and the expectations placed upon her are discussed in the book, including her hesitation over adopting the title Princess of Wales.

Myers describes the couple's contrasting personalities and working styles, portraying their marriage as shaped by contrasting temperaments. The book further covers decisions related to family life and parenting, including discussions surrounding Prince George's upbringing and naming considerations. Myers writes that "Alexander" was the first choice for a boy and "Alexandra" for a girl.

Later chapters reportedly address recent challenges faced by the family, including Catherine's cancer announcement and the support she received from her family. The book, citing sources close to William, denies his brother Prince Harry's account of a physical fight between the two.

== See also ==
- The Diana Chronicles, by Tina Brown
- The Queen: Her Life, by Andrew Morton
- Philip: The Final Portrait, by Gyles Brandreth
