= An Interview with HRH The Princess of Wales =

- Panorama episode
- A still from the interview
- Episode no.: Series 43; Episode 35
- Presented by: Martin Bashir
- Cinematography by: Tony Poole
- Editing by: Steve Hewlett
- Original air date: 20 November 1995

"An Interview with HRH The Princess of Wales" is an episode of the BBC documentary series Panorama which was broadcast on BBC1 on 20 November 1995. The 54-minute programme saw Diana, Princess of Wales, interviewed by journalist Martin Bashir about her relationship with her husband, Charles, Prince of Wales, and the reasons for their subsequent separation. The programme was watched by nearly 23 million viewers in the UK. The worldwide audience was estimated at 200 million across 100 countries. In the UK, the National Grid reported a 1,000 MW surge in demand for power after the programme. At the time, the BBC hailed the interview as the scoop of a generation.

In 2020, the Director-General of the BBC Tim Davie apologised to the princess's brother Lord Spencer because Bashir had used forged bank statements to win his and Diana's trust to secure the interview. Former Justice of the Supreme Court Lord John Dyson conducted an independent inquiry into the issue. Dyson's inquiry found Bashir guilty of deceit and of breaching BBC editorial conduct to obtain the interview. A year after the inquiry's conclusion, Tim Davie announced that the BBC would never air the interview again and would not license it to other broadcasters.

== Background ==
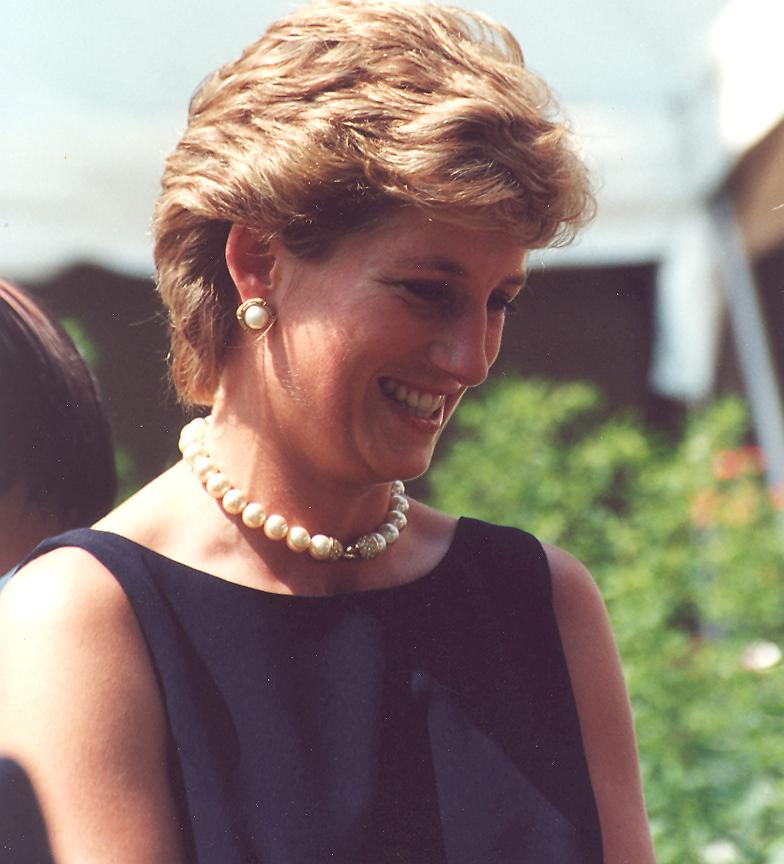
Diana in 1995, the year the interview was recorded

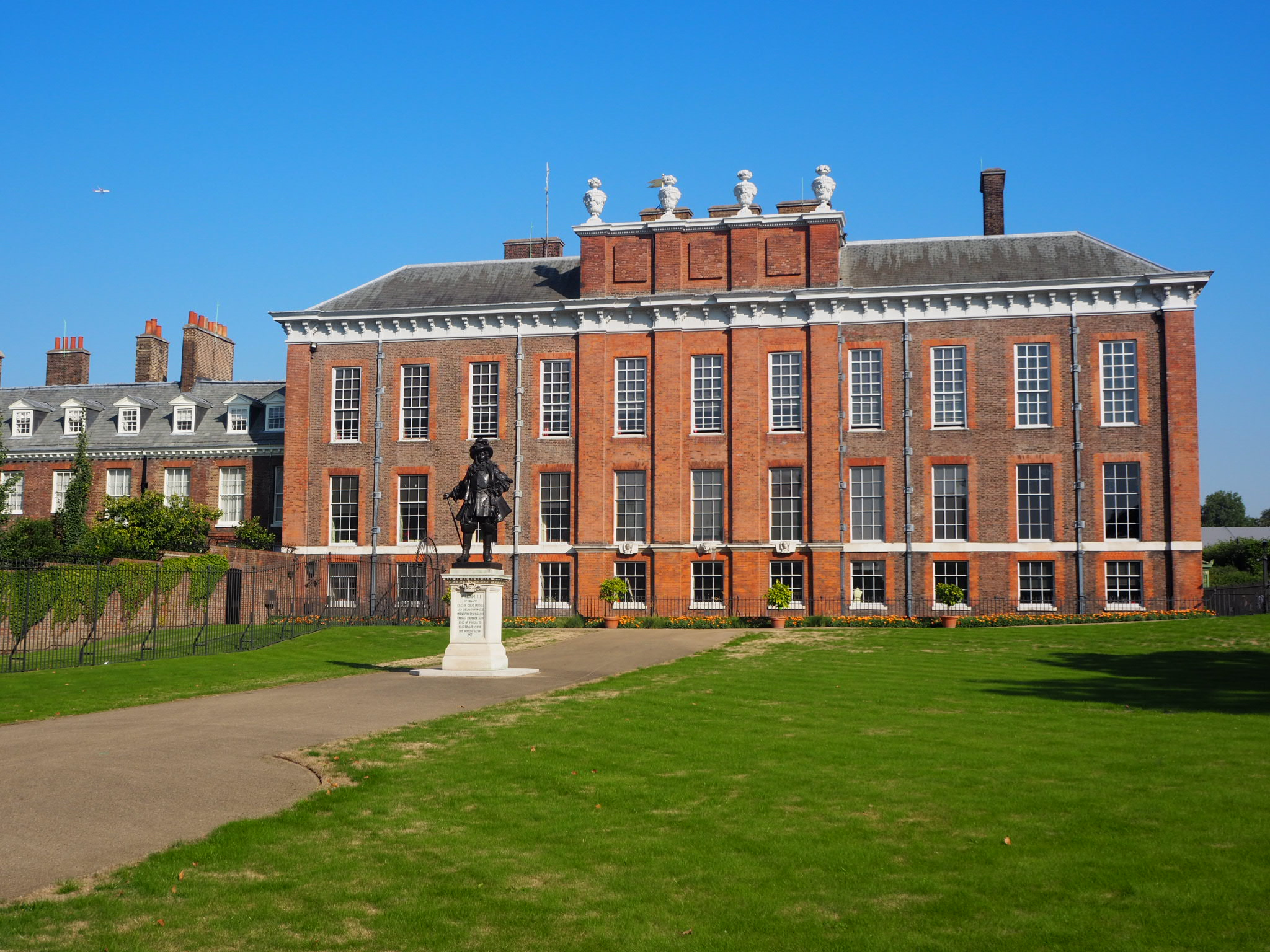
Kensington Palace, the site of the interview

Martin Bashir's interview with Diana, Princess of Wales, was conducted in Diana's sitting room at Kensington Palace on 5 November 1995; the room later became the playden for Princes William and Harry. The camera and recording equipment had been brought into the palace under the pretence of installing a new hi-fi system. In addition to Bashir, Panorama producer Mike Robinson and a cameraman, Tony Poole, were also present. To ensure the secrecy of the interview, the final transmission tape was kept under constant surveillance and security guards were present during its editing. In the week following the recording of the interview, the BBC's controller of editorial policy, Richard Ayre; the head of weekly television current affairs programmes, Tim Gardam; and Panorama editor Steve Hewlett watched the interview at the Grand Hotel in Eastbourne.

The Board of Governors of the BBC were deliberately kept unaware of the interview by Panorama executives and by the Director-General of the BBC, John Birt. The chairman of the board of governors, Marmaduke Hussey, was married to Lady Susan Hussey, a confidant of Queen Elizabeth II and a woman of the bedchamber. It was feared that the interview might have been discredited ahead of broadcast or possibly never shown if Hussey had been aware. The official royal liaison person between the BBC and the British royal family, Jim Moir, was also kept unaware. The film director David Puttnam had advised Diana against the interview and subsequently said that he would "never forgive John Birt for not explaining to Diana the implications of what she was doing and for not alerting [Marmaduke] Hussey".

Queen Elizabeth the Queen Mother brought forward the date of an operation on her hip to the week of the broadcast of the interview with the expectation that should she die – she was aged 95 – Diana's interview would receive substantially less coverage in the media. Ironically, some derogatory comments about the Queen Mother from the Princess were removed from the final cut.

== Content ==
Diana spoke of her early expectations of her marriage to Prince Charles and how she "desperately wanted it to work" in light of her own parents' divorce. The constant presence of the media and their focus on her led her to perceive herself as a "good product that sits on the shelf...and people make a lot of money out of you". The effect of the initial trip to Australia and New Zealand in 1983 was that she returned as "...a different person, I realised the sense of duty...and the demanding role I now found myself in". She was uncomfortable with being the centre of attention over her husband and had found an affinity with people who'd been "rejected by society".

Diana said that she had felt enormous relief at her pregnancy with William but that she subsequently suffered from post natal depression, which led her to be labelled by others as unstable and mentally unbalanced. She thus began self-harming and became bulimic, both of which intensified following Charles's resumption of his relationship with Camilla Parker Bowles. She famously noted, in reference to her husband's relationship with Parker Bowles, that "there were three of us in this marriage, so it was a bit crowded". Diana felt that she had been compelled to perform her role as Princess of Wales and that her behaviour had led friends of Charles to indicate "that I was again unstable and sick and should be put in a home of some sort ... I was almost an embarrassment".

Diana claimed that she never met Andrew Morton but that she allowed her friends to speak to him. His subsequent book, Diana: Her True Story would lead to Diana and Charles agreeing to a legal separation. Diana confirmed the accuracy of the Squidgygate tapes of a telephone conversation she had with James Gilbey; however, she denied the charges of having an affair with him and harassing Oliver Hoare. Diana said that she was in a unique position as the separated wife of the Prince of Wales, and that she would "fight to the end, because I have a role to fulfill and I've got two children to bring up". She confirmed her extramarital affair with James Hewitt and was hurt at his cooperation for a book about their relationship. Diana spoke of her difficulty at coping with constant media attention, which she labelled "abusive and ... harassment".

Diana spoke of her wish to be an ambassador for the United Kingdom. On the future of the monarchy she said that, "I do think that there are a few things that could change, that would alleviate this doubt, and sometimes complicated relationship between monarchy and public. I think they could walk hand in hand, as opposed to be so distant". She mentioned showing William and Harry homelessness projects and meeting people dying of AIDS. Diana said it was not her wish to divorce but did not think she would ever be queen, or that many people wanted her as queen; however, she wished to be a "queen of people's hearts, in people's hearts".

Diana felt that the royal household saw her as a "threat of some kind" but that "every strong woman in history has had to walk down a similar path, and I think it's the strength that causes the confusion and the fear". When asked if the Prince of Wales would ever be king, Diana said, "I don't think any of us know the answer to that. And obviously it's a question that's in everybody's head. But who knows, who knows what fate will produce, who knows what circumstances will provoke?" and that, "There was always conflict on that subject with him when we discussed it, and I understood that conflict, because it's a very demanding role, being Prince of Wales, but it's an equally more demanding role being King".

== Aftermath ==
Birt subsequently wrote in his memoirs that, "In effect the Diana interview marked the end of the BBC's institutional reverence—though not its respect—for the monarchy." Birt had previously liased with Robert Fellowes and Robin Janvrin while negotiating the BBC's access to the British royal family and wrote that he "had been sorry to hurt such good people". The BBC soon lost its sole production of the Queen's Royal Christmas Message in the wake of the interview, though Buckingham Palace denied that it was the reason, saying the new arrangements "reflect the composition of the television and radio industries today."

Prince William who was 13 years old at the time of the interview's airing was reported to have been "overcome with a feeling of dread" when he saw the interview, while Prince Harry who was 11 years old at the time initially refused to watch it and later blamed Bashir for asking personal invasive questions and not his mother for answering them. In Simon Heffer's opinion, by going public about her marital issues, Diana's only purpose was "to manipulate public opinion ruthlessly, and to cause whatever damage she could to her husband and his family." Tina Brown held a similar view and argued that Diana's "purpose was to frame herself to the British public as a betrayed woman before the increasingly inevitable divorce from Charles". The interview proved to be the tipping point. On 20 December, Buckingham Palace announced that the Queen had sent letters to Charles and Diana, advising them to divorce.

Sarah Bradford believed Diana was a "victim of her own poor judgment" as she lost social privilege by doing the Panorama interview. However, according to former BBC Royal Correspondent Jennie Bond, Diana told Bond in late 1996 that she did not regret the interview. She is reported to have said: "Suddenly it seemed right, particularly with a divorce on the horizon. I thought that would mean a gagging clause. And I felt it was then or never."

== 2020 investigation ==
=== Allegations and concerns ===
In November 2020, interest was renewed in the circumstances of the interview on its 25th anniversary, with documentaries being broadcast by all of the UK's non-BBC terrestrial channels, comprising ITV (The Diana Interview, Revenge of a Princess), Channel 4 (Diana: The Truth Behind The Interview), and Channel 5 (Diana: The Interview That Shocked The World).

Following these documentaries, BBC Director-General Tim Davie apologised to the princess's brother, Earl Spencer, for the use of forged bank statements falsely indicating people close to her had been paid for spying. The people named in the fabricated bank statements included Alan Waller, an employee of Lord Spencer; Patrick Jephson, Diana's former private secretary; and Richard Aylard, Prince Charles's former private secretary. The falsified documents had been created by one of the BBC's freelance graphic designers, Matt Wiessler. An internal investigation in 1996 concluded that the documents were not used to secure the interview and cleared Bashir of any wrongdoing. The inquiry, following a Mail on Sunday account of the falsified documents, was headed by Tony Hall, who later became BBC director-general, to be succeeded by Davie in 2020. Hall acknowledged having never interviewed Wiessler for the 1996 inquiry. Wiessler's house had been robbed a month after the interview aired and two CDs containing the graphics he had created for Bashir were stolen. Wiessler said in 2020 that work dried up for him after the 1996 inquiry cleared Bashir, and said he had been made the scapegoat. Similarly, former BBC producer Mark Killick was removed from Panorama after voicing his concerns about the falsified documents.

Lord Spencer, also not interviewed in the 1996 investigation, rejected the apology and demanded an inquiry. Spencer told Davie that his records of contacts with Bashir implied the journalist lied to the princess to gain her trust. Spencer claimed that he would not have introduced Bashir to his sister without the falsified documents and charged that Bashir had made false and defamatory claims about senior members of the royal family. Davie announced on 9 November that the BBC was in the process of commissioning an independent inquiry. Michael Grade, a former chairman of the corporation, said that the allegations left "a very dark cloud hanging over BBC journalism".

At the time of the revelations about his interview with the princess, Bashir, who had been rehired by the BBC in 2016 as its religion and ethics correspondent, was seriously ill from the aftereffects of COVID-19 and was recuperating after undergoing quadruple heart bypass surgery. The BBC said Bashir's ill health had impaired its ability to investigate the controversy any further until his recovery. The Daily Mirror published a photo of Bashir taken on 6 November with the headline: "Martin Bashir visits takeaway after BBC says he's 'too ill' to respond to Princess Diana claims". The Daily Telegraph later reported on a series of emails exchanged between Bashir and the BBC's senior managers during his illness which saw him engage in detailed discussions about the scandal despite the BBC's statement that he was unable to respond to any questions publicly.

On 13 November 2020, it was reported that the BBC had found the note from Diana which cleared Bashir of pressuring her to give the interview. Jennie Bond wrote in The Sunday Times that the princess told her in a private meeting in 1996 that she did not regret the broadcast. Diana said she had feared a gagging order in her imminent divorce settlement, meaning it might have been her only chance to give an interview. Nevertheless, Rosa Monckton, who was a friend of the Princess of Wales, noticed a change in her behaviour after she became acquainted with Bashir as her focus shifted from "day-to-day matters, just like any normal friend, to suddenly becoming obsessed with plots against her."

=== Independent inquiry and outcome ===
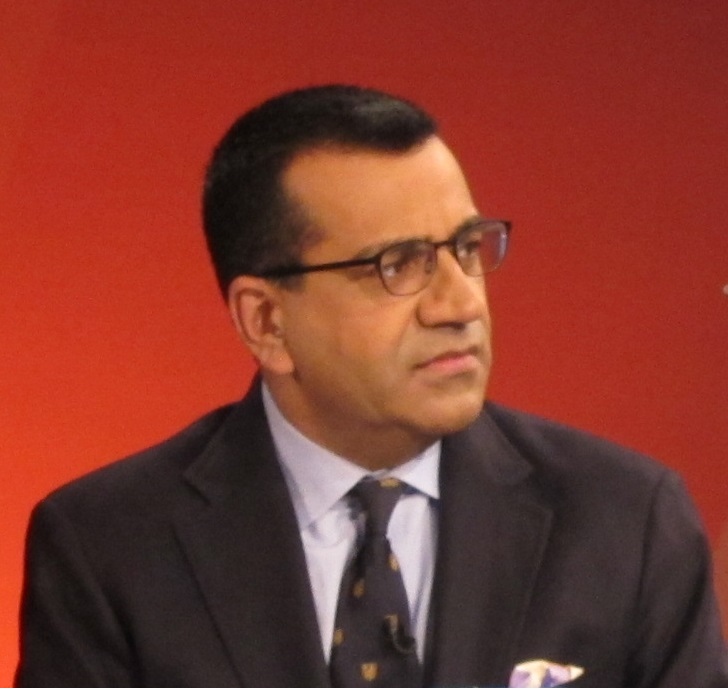
A 2021 inquiry found Martin Bashir guilty of deceit and breaching BBC editorial conduct

On 18 November 2020, the BBC announced an independent investigation into how the interview was obtained, to be headed by former Supreme Court judge John Dyson. The following day, Prince William released a statement supporting the inquiry, saying that the investigation was a "step in the right direction" and that "it should help establish the truth behind the actions that led to the Panorama interview and subsequent decisions taken by those in the BBC at the time." It was also reported that Prince Harry was "aware" of the inquiry and was receiving updates on the situation.

On 4 March 2021, the Metropolitan Police announced that they would not begin a criminal investigation into the allegations after a "detailed assessment" and consulting with the force's lawyers, independent counsel and the Crown Prosecution Service. Later in the same month, Bashir told the BBC inquiry that he was not responsible for spreading false claims about the royal family to convince the princess to sit for the interview, and that it was probably Diana herself who was the source of those claims. Among the smears were allegations of Prince Edward being treated for AIDS; the Queen suffering from cardiac problems and intending to abdicate; and that the Prince of Wales was having an affair with his children's nanny, Tiggy Legge-Bourke.

Bashir argued that bringing up such allegations in front of Diana would have exposed him as a "complete fantasist" and narrowed down the chance of doing any interviews with her. He added that Diana had revealed to him that she spoke with mystics and clairvoyants who could have been the source of the false information given to her. Later in March, it was alleged that Bashir himself had provided Diana with a faked abortion "receipt" which led Diana to believe that Legge-Bourke had become pregnant following an affair with Prince Charles.

Bashir departed the BBC in May 2021, citing health issues. Later that month, it was reported that Dyson's inquiry found Bashir guilty of deceit and breaching BBC editorial conduct to obtain the interview. In Dyson's report, the 1996 inquiry led by Hall was described as "woefully ineffective" and the corporation was criticised for covering up the matter despite knowing how Bashir had secured the interview.

In a statement, Hall admitted that he was wrong to give Bashir the "benefit of the doubt" during the initial investigation that cleared Bashir and the BBC of wrongdoing. Following the report's release, he resigned from his position as chairman of the Board of Trustees of the National Gallery, stating that his continuing presence there would be a "distraction". Tim Suter, a former BBC executive who was part of the 1996 inquiry, also resigned from the board of Ofcom.

==== Reactions ====
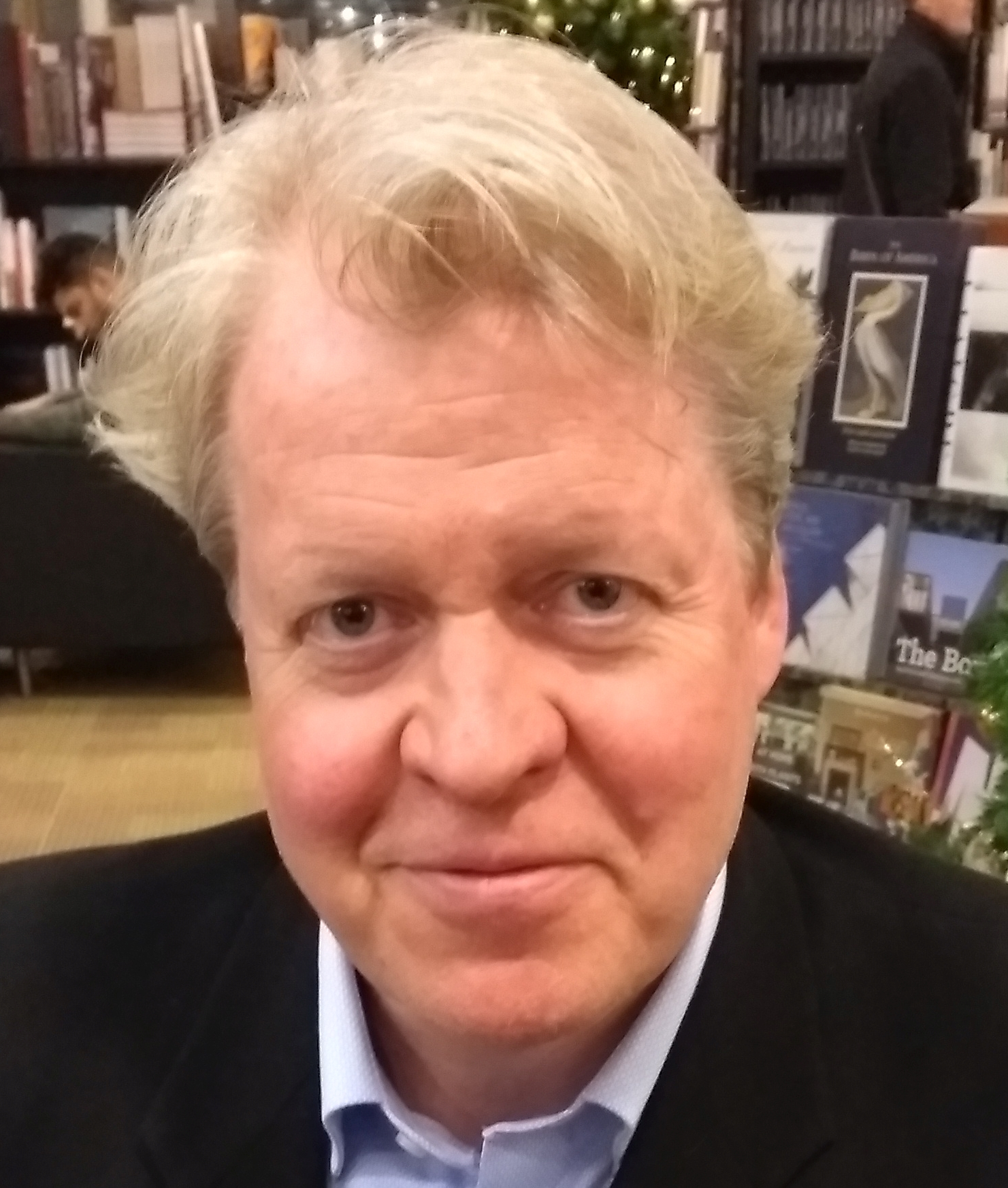
The BBC apologised to the royal family and Lord Spencer for the interview

Diana's sons issued their own statements following the conclusion of the inquiry, with William condemning the actions of BBC leaders and employees, stating that the lies told to his mother had contributed to her sense of "fear, paranoia and isolation". He argued that the interview had created a "false narrative", and due to its questionable legitimacy it should never be aired again. Harry also blamed the media and the paparazzi, adding that the "ripple effect of a culture of exploitation and unethical practices" was the reason that Diana lost her life. Diana's brother made a connection between the interview and the succeeding chain of events that led to his sister's death two years later "without any form of real protection".

Davie offered "a full and unconditional apology" and the BBC wrote apology letters to Princes Charles, William and Harry, as well as Lord Spencer. Matt Wiessler also received an apology from the BBC but described it as "too little, too late", accused the corporation of "turning their back" on him, and added that none of the senior figures responsible for the coverup had apologised to him personally. Wiessler later received compensation from the BBC in a substantial financial settlement, reported to be around £750,000. Davie also wrote to the BBC staff, stating that they needed to "learn lessons and keep improving". Former director of BBC News James Harding apologised as well and added that the responsibility for rehiring Bashir in 2016 "sits with me".

Bashir apologised through his own statement, saying that using fake documents was "a stupid thing to do and was an action I deeply regret", but added that he would still "reiterate that the bank statements had no bearing whatsoever on the personal choice by Princess Diana to take part in the interview". Speaking to The Sunday Times, he stated that, "Everything we did in terms of the interview was as she wanted", and he had not harmed Diana "in any way". He also added that Lord Spencer's attempt to hold him responsible for the subsequent tragedies in Diana's life was "unreasonable and unfair". The note written by Diana in December 1995 was published as a part of the inquiry in which she said, "Martin Bashir did not show me any documents, nor give me any information that I was not previously aware of". The report also concluded that, "By his deceitful behaviour ... Mr Bashir succeeded in engineering the meeting that led to the interview. But it is important to add that Princess Diana would probably have agreed to be interviewed". Diana's biographer Andrew Morton also stated that there was "no question at all that Diana was going to speak her mind", but that Bashir "scared her half to death" by making her believe that she was being watched by MI5 and, as a result, she chose him as the interviewer.

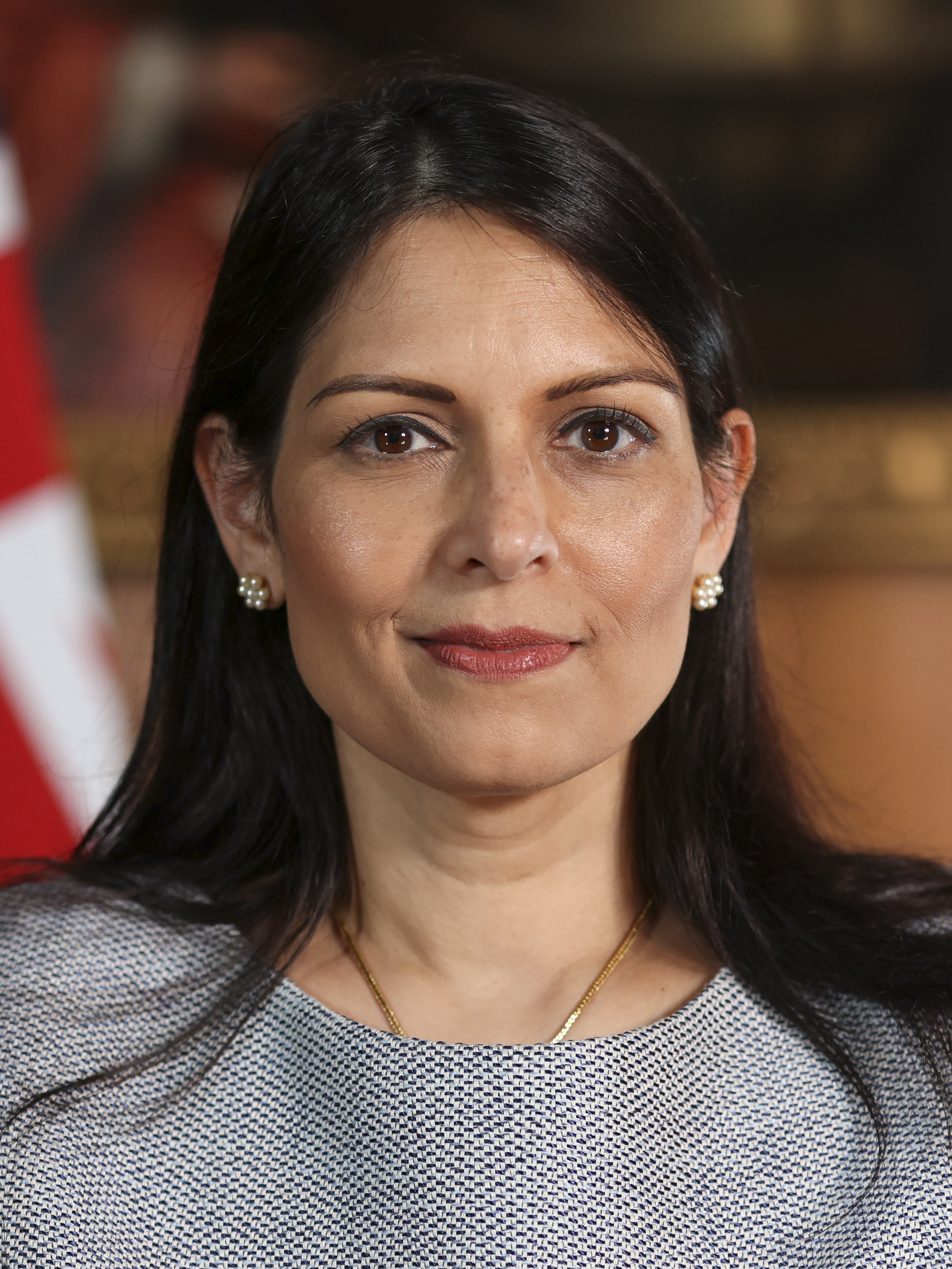
Home Secretary Priti Patel hinted at a possible criminal prosecution of the BBC

Despite the initial announcement in March that a criminal investigation would not be appropriate, the Metropolitan Police announced in May 2021 that they would assess Dyson's inquiry to look for "any significant new evidence". Lord Spencer later wrote to the Metropolitan Police chief Cressida Dick, asking them to look again at the evidence and circumstances surrounding his sister's interview. Prime Minister Boris Johnson, Justice Secretary Robert Buckland and Culture Secretary Oliver Dowden all raised concerns about governance within the BBC. Digital, Culture, Media and Sport Committee chairman Julian Knight said he was writing to Davie to find out why Bashir was rehired in 2016. Home Secretary Priti Patel also hinted at a possible criminal prosecution alongside "changes to the institution, structure, governance, accountability". However, some have argued that this response from the Conservative government and those opposed to the BBC is unwarranted and served an ulterior motive against the corporation: the government has previously been highly critical of the corporation's news coverage (in particular of Brexit) and planned to decriminalise non-payment of the television licence which funds the organisation.

In June 2021, an internal investigation led by BBC executive Ken MacQuarrie found that there were "shortcomings" in the process for rehiring Bashir in 2016, but none of the individuals involved in the process knew about the deceitful methods he had used to secure the 1995 interview. MacQuarrie added that they had "found no evidence that Martin Bashir was rehired to contain and/or cover up the events surrounding the 1995 Panorama programme". Knight stated that the rehiring process still raised "disturbing" concerns, adding: "That the BBC considered rehiring Martin Bashir when there were high-level doubts over his integrity stretches incredulity to breaking point".

Former BBC directors general – Tony Hall and John Birt, the incumbent Tim Davie, and chairman Richard Sharp – appeared in front of the Digital, Culture, Media and Sport Committee on 15 June to answer questions about the interview. During the hearing, Knight further criticised the decision to rehire Bashir, "a known liar", and added that there had been "a failure of morality". Hall stated that the 1996 inquiry which found Bashir as an "honest and honourable man" was the result of "wrong judgement", and that their trust in him was "abused and misplaced". He also denied any attempts "to conceal anything". Birt described the affair as "an absolute horror story", adding that they were all deceived by "a serial liar on an industrial scale" who perpetrated "one of the biggest crimes in the history of broadcasting". Davie also stated that at the time of Bashir's rehiring in 2016, the 1996 report was the only official document that addressed the issues related to the interview but it did not show the wrongdoings revealed "at the level we found out from the commissioning of Lord Dyson".

In September 2021, the Metropolitan Police announced that they would not be launching a criminal investigation into the interview after assessing the Dyson report. In the same month, Tiggy Legge-Bourke, who was the subject of the fake abortion receipt, was offered significant damages by the BBC.

In an article in The Daily Telegraph of 9 October 2021, Tom Mangold asserted that the BBC manages its funds very carefully. Bashir could not have paid for the faked documents, Mangold argued, without allowing Hewlett to look at the documents and sign off on them. Mangold claimed that, as rumours of the faked documents emerged, he and two others attempted to warn Hewlett, who told them the matter was none of their business and attributed the speculation about the documents as the rumour-mongering of jealous colleagues. During the 1996 inquiry, neither Hewlett nor Lord Spencer were invited to attend. A key internal memorandum by Gardam has disappeared from the BBC archives. Despite Freedom of Information requests, no internal document to or from Hewlett has been published.

In March 2022, the BBC apologised "unreservedly" to Patrick Jephson and paid him a "substantial sum" in damages (reported to be around £100,000) for the "serious harm" caused to him due to the manner through which the interview was obtained by Bashir. Jephson announced that he would donate the money to the Welsh charity Tŷ Hafan in memory of the late princess.

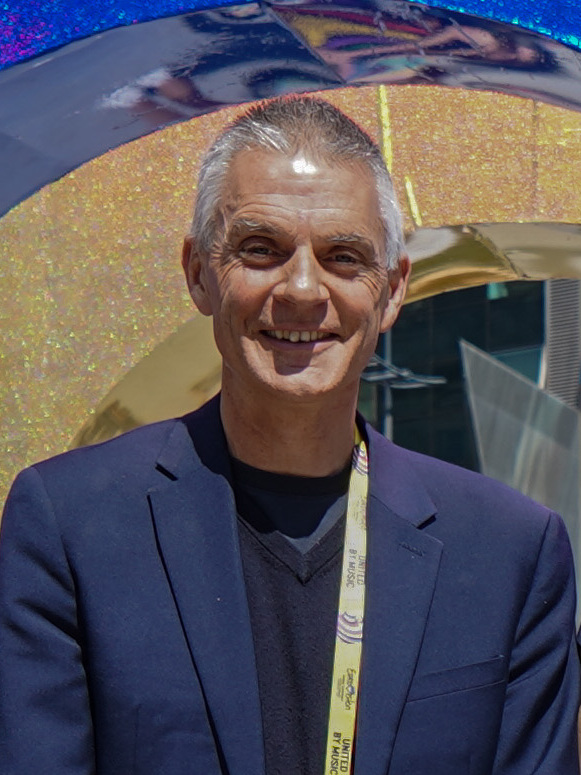
In 2022 Tim Davie of the BBC said it would never air the interview again

In July 2022, the BBC in a High Court public apology to Tiggy Legge-Bourke stated, "The BBC accepts that the allegations made against the claimant were wholly baseless, should never have been made, and that the BBC did not, at the time, adequately investigate serious concerns over the circumstances in which the BBC secured the Panorama interview with Diana, Princess of Wales." The BBC announced they would pay substantial damages and legal costs to the claimant, which was reported to be around £200,000. BBC's director-general Tim Davie would later say that the BBC would never air the interview again and would no longer license the whole interview nor partial segments to other broadcasters. Davies noted that the interview did nevertheless "remain part of the historical record and there may be occasions in the future when it [would] be justified for the BBC to use short extracts for journalistic purposes", but such usage would be sparing, would require authorisation at executive committee level, and would be presented "in the full context of what we now know about the way the interview was obtained"; he also urged other broadcasters to implement similar restrictions on their future usage of the material. At the same time, Lord Spencer again called for the police to open an investigation into the circumstances in which the interview was obtained.

In September 2022, it was reported that the BBC had donated £1.4 million, which it had earned by selling the rights to the interview to other TV channels and networks, to seven charities associated with Diana, Princess of Wales: Centrepoint, English National Ballet, Great Ormond Street Hospital, the Leprosy Mission, the National AIDS Trust, the Royal Marsden Hospital, and the Diana Award. In the same month, the BBC announced that it had apologised and paid £60,000 to Alan Kuznetsov (formerly Alan Waller), Lord Spencer's former head of security who was named in the fabricated bank statements.

Documentary maker Andy Webb sought the release of internal BBC documents on the interview (including 3,000 emails) under the Freedom of Information Act and Lord Spencer took part in an information rights tribunal held as part of the case in September 2023. Spencer stated that he had first informed the BBC of his concerns about the interview circa 2006. He also dismissed a suggestion made by a senior BBC lawyer that he had colluded with Bashir. Judge Brian Kennedy issued an order in December 2023 directing the release of emails pertaining to the time in 2020 that the broadcaster was handling the controversy surrounding the interview. The BBC released the emails in January 2024. In one email from July 2020, Bashir argued that forged documents had no bearing on obtaining the interview and if a "dynastic" journalist like David Dimbleby had been involved there would have been less controversy. He also cited "professional jealousy" within the BBC and the fact that he was "a second-generation immigrant of non-white, working-class roots" as factors that made him a target.

== Awards ==
Bashir and Robinson were the recipients of the BAFTA Award for Best Talk Show at the 1996 British Academy Television Awards for their work on the interview. Bashir also won the Factual or Science Based Programme of the Year from the Television and Radio Industries Club, TV Journalist of the Year from the Broadcasting Press Guild, and Journalist of the Year from the Royal Television Society.

In May 2021, after the conclusion of the Dyson inquiry that found Bashir guilty of deceit in obtaining the interview and the corporation of "incompetence" in their investigation, the BBC decided to return all awards it received for the programme, including the BAFTA.

== In popular culture ==
The first half of the 2013 biographical film Diana, directed by Oliver Hirschbiegel and starring Naomi Watts as Diana, includes a depiction of the interview, with Bashir being played by Prasanna Puwanarajah.

Season 5 of Netflix's The Crown, which was originally made available for streaming on 9 November 2022, depicts the lead-up to the interview, the interview proper, and the initial aftermath over the course of its seventh ("No Woman's Land"), eighth ("Gunpowder"), and ninth ("Couple 31") episodes. Diana is played by Elizabeth Debicki, while Bashir is again played by Prasanna Puwanarajah. The series shows Diana giving advance warning of the interview to Elizabeth II; in reality, it has been reported that no such warning was given and that the interview took the Royal Family by surprise.

Jonathan Maitland, who had previously worked with Bashir, would write a play about the interview. Issues stemming from Prince William's view, and the BBC's subsequent decision, that the interview should never be shown again (following the revelations about Bashir's conduct) meant that the play mostly focuses on events before and after the interview; depiction of the interview is mostly limited to such parts as are "well known and famous enough to be in the public domain as historical quotes". Maitland did nevertheless have access to material that was either cut from the original interview or was transcribed but not filmed. The play, named simply The Interview, was first performed at the Park Theatre from 27 October to 25 November 2023, with Diana being played by Yolanda Kettle and Bashir being played by Tibu Fortes.

== See also ==
- Charles: The Private Man, the Public Role, 1994 documentary and interview with Charles, Prince of Wales
- "Prince Andrew & the Epstein Scandal", a 2019 interview with Prince Andrew, Duke of York
- Interviews with Prince Harry, Duke of Sussex
  - Oprah with Meghan and Harry, 2021 interview with Prince Harry and Meghan, Duchess of Sussex
  - Harry: The Interview, 2023 interview with Prince Harry only
