= Nicola Tallis =

British historian and author

Nicola Tallis FRHistS
- Born: Nicola Louise Tallis; 1985 (age 40–41); Cardiff, Wales
- Education: Bath Spa University; Royal Holloway, University of London; University of Winchester
- Website: nicolatallis.com/biography/

Nicola Louise Tallis FRHistS (born 1985) is a British historian and author whose work centres on the politics and material culture of the Tudor and Stuart courts.

== Early life and education ==
Tallis was born in Cardiff and grew up in Wiltshire. She initially qualified as beautician before deciding to study history. Tallis graduated with a Bachelor of Arts (BA) from Bath Spa University in 2011 and a Master of Arts (MA) from Royal Holloway, University of London in 2013. She completed a PhD at the University of Winchester in 2019.

== Career ==
Tallis began her career working as a curator and guide at Sudeley Castle. In 2013, she featured in the BBC series Countryfile.

In 2016, Michael O'Mara Books acquired the rights to publish Tallis' debut book Crown of Blood: The Deadly Inheritance of Lady Jane Grey. Michael O'Mara Books would publish Tallis' second and third books Elizabeth's Rival: The Tumultuous Tale of Lettice Knollys, Countess of Leicester in 2017 and Uncrowned Queen: The Fateful Life of Margaret Beaufort, Tudor Matriarch in 2019.

Tallis contributed to a 2021 installment of the BBC programme Who Do You Think You Are about the Boleyn family. She published her PhD All The Queen's Jewels, 1445–1548: Power, Majesty and Display in 2023. She featured in the 2023 Channel 4 special Frankie Boyle's Farewell to the Monarchy. Also in 2023, Tallis reunited with Michael O'Mara Books for the publication of her next book Young Elizabeth: Princess. Prisoner. Queen in 2024. Young Elizabeth was named a Book of the Week by Katherine Harvey of The Sunday Times.

Tallis is a Fellow of the Royal Historical Society.

== Publications ==
- Crown of Blood: The Deadly Inheritance of Lady Jane Grey (Michael O'Mara, 2016)
- Elizabeth's Rival: The Tumultuous Tale of Lettice Knollys, Countess of Leicester (Michael O'Mara, 2017)
- Uncrowned Queen: The Fateful Life of Margaret Beaufort, Tudor Matriarch (Michael O'Mara, 2019)
- All The Queen's Jewels, 1445–1548: Power, Majesty and Display (Routledge, 2023)
- Young Elizabeth: Princess. Prisoner. Queen (Michael O'Mara, 2024)
