= Charles: The Private Man, the Public Role =

1994 documentary about Charles III

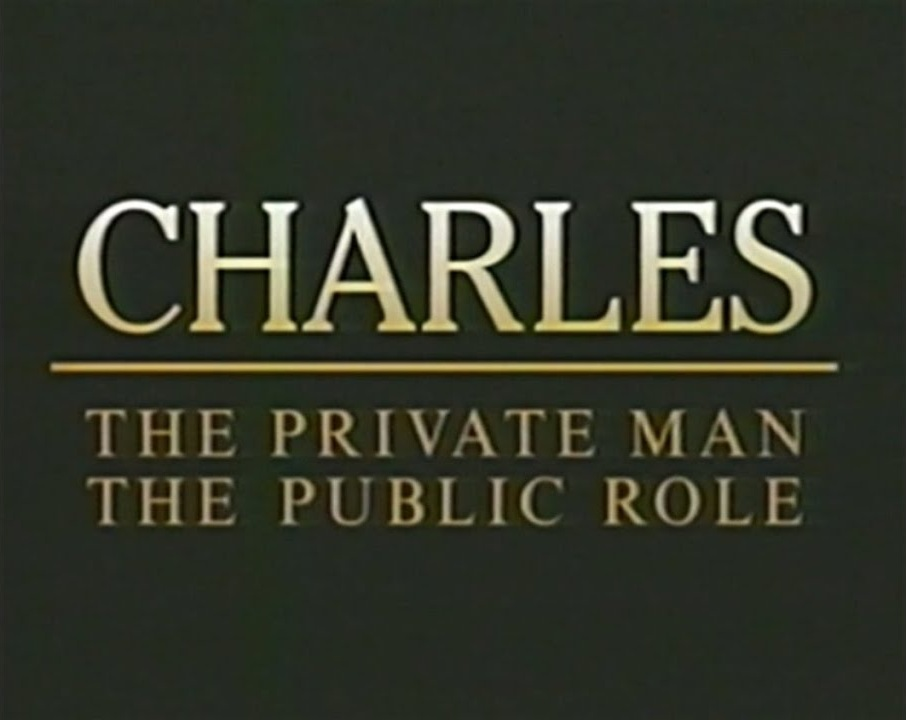
- Genre: Documentary film
- Presented by: Jonathan Dimbleby
- Country of origin: United Kingdom
- Original language: English

Production
- Running time: 150 minutes

Original release
- Network: ITV
- Release: 29 June 1994

Charles: The Private Man, the Public Role is a documentary about Charles III, then Prince of Wales, broadcast on 29 June 1994 on ITV. It was presented by Jonathan Dimbleby.

Excerpts from the film were broadcast on NBC's Dateline a few days after its original broadcast.

== Content and production ==
The programme was two and half hours in duration and featured several interviews with Charles. The programme was broadcast to mark the 25th anniversary of Charles's investiture as Prince of Wales.

Film production took 18 months, and 180 hours of footage was shot. The remaining footage is believed to be stored at Windsor Castle. The broadcast of the film was watched by 13 million people. In the UK, the National Grid reported a 700 MW surge in demand for power after the programme, as viewers switched on lights and turned on their kettles for a cup of tea. Dimbleby said of his documentary that "While I had no reason to feel any hostility towards the Prince, I did not want to be in a position of painting a glossy portrait". Dimbleby said that he had "complete editorial freedom" in the making of the film. In an interview with Valerie Grove in July 1994, Dimbleby said that had he not asked the question on infidelity he would have been "pilloried" and that Charles was "perfectly entitled to say it is nobody's business". Dimbleby said that Charles "cannot lie, he's not good at disguising it when he's not having a good time, and in conversation I don't think he is capable of telling a lie" and that "What comes through is a man speaking the truth — his face, his body language, his anguish".

The film shows Charles on his official visits to Mexico, the Middle East, Australia, and various countries in Europe. Charles is interviewed about his children, Prince William and Prince Harry, and the failure of his marriage to their mother, Diana, Princess of Wales. Dimbleby asked Charles if he had been faithful to his wife, Charles admitted that he had been "until it became clear that the marriage had irretrievably broken". Charles described the failure of his marriage as "the last possible thing that I ever wanted. I mean, I'm not a total idiot [...] It's not something that I went into, marriage, you know, with the intention of this happening, or in any way in a cynical frame of mind [...] I have always tried to get it right and tried to do the right thing by everybody". Referring to the extensive media coverage of his marriage Charles said that "It's so difficult though, in this day and age, I find, to know how to play the media [...] It is very hard, I think, to know where the balance lies".

Charles spoke of his belief that Islam, Catholicism, Zoroastrianism and other faiths were of equal importance to Protestantism and that he preferred the title "Defender of the Divine" to "Defender of the Faith" (in reference to the British monarch's role as Supreme Governor of the Church of England). Charles also argued that Britain should reintroduce a form of national service for young people and foreign governments should contribute to the financial upkeep for British military interventions in their countries when it was part of an international effort.

=== Admission of adultery ===
In the programme Charles notably admitted to having committed adultery after it had become clear to him that his marriage had broken down. Charles and Diana had separated two years before the programme. Dimbleby referred to reports in tabloid newspapers regarding Charles's personal life and asked him if he had tried to be "faithful and honourable" to his wife, to which Charles replied "Yes, absolutely". Dimbleby asked him if he had been faithful to her and Charles replied "Yes [...] Until it became irretrievably broken down, us both having tried".

Richard Aylard, the Private Secretary to the Prince of Wales, confirmed that the woman in question was Camilla Parker Bowles at a press conference the day after the programme. Charles had referred to Camilla as a "dear friend" and "a great friend of mine" but described her as only one of "a large number of friends". Camilla and her husband, Andrew Parker Bowles, divorced in January 1995.

== Reception and aftermath ==
Dimbleby's biography of Charles, The Prince of Wales: A Biography was published in November 1994.

Writing in The Guardian in 2021, Caroline Davies wrote that Charles's "astonishing admission of adultery on camera stunned the nation" and that the "fallout was immense, not least because it led to Diana's famous retaliatory interview". (Diana's interview with Martin Bashir was broadcast in November 1995). On the night the interview was broadcast, Diana attended an event at the Serpentine Gallery in Kensington Gardens wearing a "daring" black off the shoulder dress that has been interpreted as having been worn "in revenge" for Charles's admission of adultery. Penny Goldstone wrote in Marie Claire in 2021 that the dress remains one of Diana's "most iconic styles of all time".

William Rees-Mogg wrote in The Times that the documentary was "part of a public relations exercise" that had been planned "to restore [Charles's] image" and compared it to previous examples of British royal "public relations" including Edward III's foundation of the Order of the Garter and Henry VIII's Field of the Cloth of Gold. Peter Waymark wrote in The Times that the programme "fills two-and-a-half hours of peak screentime and should go far to meet complaints that he [Charles] is not given fair treatment by the media".

The film was seen as an attempt by supporters of Charles to redress the media coverage garnered by Diana in the previous decade; Steve Coll wrote in The Washington Post that "the prince has been overshadowed by Diana's global charisma and more recently has been victimized, at least in the view of the Charles camp, by systematic leaks to the media that she authorized" and that the film was "the prince's calculated attempt to match Diana at her own media game". Alan Hamilton wrote in The Times in November 1995 that the film was "an earnest examination of the man's boundless, but not always riveting, good works" and that "The jewel, when revealed, was set amid great cushions of sympathetic padding ... The disclosure was not in itself a shock, for the tabloids had been raking the coals for months beforehand; yet it was a shock to hear it from his own lips, and a shock that he should choose such a public platform as his confessional" and that "the Prince attracted far more sympathy than opprobrium for what viewers saw as his decision to be so honest".

Two-thirds of respondents to a telephone poll conducted by The Sun believed Charles "unfit to be king" in the aftermath of the interview.

Reviewing the film in The Washington Post, Steve Coll described it as having the "... tone of a wartime propaganda film – obsequious and elaborately flattering". Referring to the media frenzy in the wake of the programme Coll wrote that "Tiny nuances in leaked excerpts from the film have been dissected for days by tabloid and broadsheet newspapers seeking clues to Charles's royal intentions. The implications of his words for the long-term health of the British monarchy have been widely debated. Winners and losers in Britain's royal sweepstakes have been publicly assessed".

Reviewing the film in The Independent, Allison Pearson wrote that the tone of the film was "both privileged and self-indulgent – the very qualities it strove to play down in its subject" and that by "posing the big infidelity question", Dimbleby "kept his journalistic credibility, but also drew attention away from a docile approach elsewhere". Pearson felt the film was "the most remarkable royal film ever made" by virtue of its access to Charles's emotional life. Pearson concluded that "The headlines predictably zeroed in on the Prince's adultery and broad definition of faith, but 13 million viewers will have taken away a picture of a man as decent as he is troubled".

In his column for The Times, Matthew Parris wrote in June 1994 that Dimbleby "struck a small but welcome blow for civilised television discourse" feeling that "It was not a matter of extracting or bludgeoning opinions from [Charles]. As a result, Dimbleby was able to adopt the role of midwife to a natural birth, rather than surgeon in a Caesarean section" and "It was clear that Dimbleby had accompanied the Prince almost everywhere for a very long period. They must have had innumerable chats, some private, some recorded. Different "interviews" appeared to have taken place at very different times and in different circumstances. So what we got was a developing conversation between two men. The fear and tension, the urgency and artificiality which often produce "news" but so seldom enhance understanding or sympathy, were absent". Dimbleby was a "... softman extraordinaire. He was never rude, never insistent. His questions were never tendentious. Only with the utmost gentleness did he lead his witness".

== See also ==
- "An Interview with HRH The Princess of Wales", 1995 interview with Diana, Princess of Wales
- "Prince Andrew & the Epstein Scandal", 2019 interview with Prince Andrew, Duke of York
- Interviews with Prince Harry, Duke of Sussex
  - Oprah with Meghan and Harry, 2021 interview with Prince Harry and Meghan, Duchess of Sussex
  - Harry: The Interview, 2023 interview with Prince Harry only
