= TV pickup =

Increases of electrical power consumption at high rating TV programmes

TV pickup is a phenomenon that occurs in the United Kingdom involving sudden surges in demand on the national electrical grid, occurring when a large number of people simultaneously watch the same television programme. TV pickup occurs when viewers take advantage of commercial breaks in programming to operate electrical appliances at the same time, causing large synchronised surges in national electricity consumption. Such sudden huge surges in demand tied to the TV schedule are unique to the United Kingdom.

Electricity networks devote considerable resources to predicting and providing supply for these events, which typically impose an extra demand of around 200–400 megawatts (MW) on the British National Grid. Short-term supply is often obtained from pumped storage reservoirs, which can be quickly brought online, and are backed up by the slower fossil fuel and nuclear power stations. The largest ever pickup occurred on 4 July 1990, when a 2800 megawatt demand was imposed by the ending of the penalty shootout in the England v West Germany FIFA World Cup semi-final. In addition to pickups, the Grid also prepares for synchronised switch-offs during remembrance and energy-awareness events.

== Cause ==
TV pickups occur during breaks in popular television programmes and are a surge in demand caused by the switching on of millions of electric kettles to brew cups of tea or coffee. Kettles in the UK are particularly high powered, typically consuming 2.5–3.0 kW and create a very high peak demand on the electrical grid. The phenomenon is common in the UK, where individual programmes can often attract a significantly large audience share. The introduction of a wider range of TV channels is mitigating the effect, but it remains a large concern for the National Grid operators.

There are typically several large peaks in energy use caused by TV pickup during each day, dependent on TV schedules, the day of the week and weather. The largest pickup of the day is usually at 21:00, when several popular TV programmes end or go to commercial breaks. The most popular programmes, hence those giving the greatest pickup are soaps, sporting events, and reality TV. A typical TV pickup imposes an extra demand of 200–400 megawatts, with larger soap storylines bringing around 700–800 MW.

== Response ==
A sudden increase in demand, unmatched by an increase in supply, causes a drop in the mains frequency across the Grid (locally the voltage may also be affected due to changes in reactive power flows).

The National Grid Energy Balancing Team is responsible for ensuring an adequate supply of electricity and try to ensure a frequency of between 49.5 and 50.5 Hz is maintained. To prepare for pickups the team runs a computer program that compares the current day with corresponding periods over the past five years to predict the size of demand, and studies TV schedules to anticipate demand from popular shows. Grid employees must also be familiar with popular soap-opera storylines as one might cause a sudden rise in demand. Owing to this, they are aware of what shows attract the largest audiences and of customers' television choices; one expressed his disapproval in 2013, "The TV pickup from Deal or No Deal is gobsmackingly high. How sad is that?"

Sporting events like tennis matches are especially difficult because of the impossibility of predicting when one will end. International football finals are a particular problem as research has shown that 71% of people in the UK will watch them at home instead of public venues such as pubs. The Grid predicted a pickup of around 3000 MW, equivalent to 1.2 million kettles being turned on at once, if England made the later stages of the 2010 FIFA World Cup.

Diagram of a typical pumped storage power station

It is important to predict demand as precisely as possible as electricity grids are not capable of storing electricity in large quantities and all power stations have a lead-in time before generation can begin. Balancing teams attempt to meet short term fluctuations with "fast reserves" that are quick to come online, backed up with longer term fossil fuel-based "balance mechanism units". The shortest lead-in times are on pumped storage reservoirs, such as the Dinorwig Power Station that has the fastest response time of any pumped storage station in the world at just 12 seconds to produce 1320 MW. Once the longer term fossil fuel stations, which have response times around half an hour, and nuclear power stations, which can take even longer, come online then pumped storage stations can be turned off and the water returned to the reservoir. If capacity further exceeds demand, additional power is accessible via the HVDC Cross-Channel and BritNed undersea power cables that connect the UK to France and the Netherlands respectively.

== Records ==
The largest TV pickups recorded in the UK are:

Pickup demand	Date	Programme
2800 MW	4 July 1990	England v West Germany FIFA World Cup semi-final penalty shootout
2600 MW	22 January 1984	The Thorn Birds – Final episode
2570 MW	21 June 2002	England v Brazil FIFA World Cup quarter-final
2340 MW	12 June 2002	Nigeria v England FIFA World Cup group match
2290 MW	5 April 2001	EastEnders – "Who Shot Phil?"
2200 MW	16 January 1984	The Thorn Birds – Episode 4/5
2200 MW	20 July 1989	The Thorn Birds
2200 MW	5 August 1985	Dallas
2200 MW	28 April 1991	The Darling Buds of May
2200 MW	12 May 1991	The Darling Buds of May
2200 MW	18 April 1994	EastEnders & Coronation Street (combined)
2110 MW	22 November 2003	England v Australia Rugby World Cup Final
2100 MW	30 June 1998	Argentina v England FIFA World Cup round of 16 half time
2100 MW	19 February 1986	The Colbys
2010 MW	7 April 2002	Coronation Street
2000 MW	1 April 1991	Coronation Street
2000 MW	3 July 1990	Italy v Argentina FIFA World Cup semi-final
2000 MW	2 April 1984	Coronation Street & Blue Thunder (combined)
1960 MW	1 July 2006	England v Portugal FIFA World Cup quarter-final
1900 MW	5 April 1994	EastEnders
1830 MW	20 June 2006	Sweden v England FIFA World Cup group match
1820 MW	21 April 1999	Juventus v Manchester United UEFA Champions League semi-final
1820 MW	21 June 2002	England v Brazil FIFA World Cup quarter-final
1800 MW	29 July 1981	Wedding of Prince Charles and Lady Diana Spencer
1800 MW	2 September 1992	Coronation Street
1800 MW	3 September 1992	EastEnders
1800 MW	7 September 1992	Coronation Street
1800 MW	11 July 2021	England v Italy UEFA European Football Championship final
1700 MW	25 June 2006	England v Ecuador FIFA World Cup round of 16
1600 MW	29 December 1996	Only Fools and Horses – "Time On Our Hands"
1600 MW	29 April 2011	Wedding of Prince William and Catherine Middleton
1400 MW	11 July 2018	England v Croatia FIFA World Cup semi-final
1400 MW	7 July 2018	England v Sweden FIFA World Cup quarter-final
1400 MW	7 July 2021	England v Denmark UEFA European Football Championship semi-final
1300 MW	14 July 2024	Spain v England UEFA European Football Championship final (half-time)
1200 MW	3 July 2018	England v Colombia FIFA World Cup round of 16
1000 MW	10 July 2024	Netherlands v England UEFA European Football Championship semi-final (half-time)
1000 MW	20 November 1995	"An Interview with HRH The Princess of Wales"
950 MW	16 April 2020	Clap for Our Carers
700 MW	29 June 1994	Charles: The Private Man, the Public Role

Other events can cause even bigger pickups for the National Grid than television events. Immediately following the solar eclipse of 11 August 1999 there was a record demand of 3000 MW. This was the largest rapid increase that the grid had ever experienced but it had been anticipated and sufficient generating plant were made ready to accommodate the additional demand. Around 1000 MW of the demand was due to traditional TV pick-up demand caused by kettles, with the remainder arising from the return of people to their workplaces.

The Grid also plans for the opposite effect, a co-ordinated mass switch-off of appliances. Boxing Day is consistently, according to one employee, "the lowest of the low" power usage. At midday on 5 January 2005 a three minutes silence in remembrance of the Boxing Day Tsunami resulted in a 1300 MW temporary drop in consumption followed by a sudden 1400 MW rise. The 6 September 1997 funeral of Diana, Princess of Wales caused a 1000 MW drop.

Similar, though smaller, switch-offs occur annually at 11 am on Remembrance Day. These switch-offs occur during the day time, so they are smaller than pickups seen at night when more electrical appliances are likely to be in use. National Grid argued against the mass switch-off originally planned for the Live Earth and Planet Aid events as these would have resulted in highly unpredictable demands for electricity and would have generated more carbon dioxide than would have been saved. These events were subsequently cancelled.

The imposition of national lockdowns during the COVID-19 pandemic also affected the National Grid. Despite the trend towards streaming services reducing the magnitude of traditional pick-ups, televised pandemic statements such as by the Queen and Prime Minister Boris Johnson still attracted a large number of live viewers. For the Queen's 5 April 2020 address a pick-up of between 500 and 600 MW was recorded at the end of the event. The weekly Clap for Our Carers also saw a marginal dip in demand as people went outside followed by a peak in demand of around 1000 MW as people returned inside. During the lockdown periods demand for power overall was around 20% lower than usual owing to home working and furlough.

== See also ==
- Load management
- Control of the National Grid
- Energy in the United Kingdom
