= Michael O'Mara Books =

- Founded: 1985
- Founders: Michael O'Mara; Lesley O'Mara
- Country of origin: United Kingdom
- Headquarters location: London
- Distribution: Hachette UK Distribution; Hardie Grant Books (Australia); Jonathan Ball Publishers (South Africa); Trafalgar Square Publishing (USA)
- Publication types: Books
- Imprints: Buster Books; LOM ART
- Official website: www.mombooks.com

Michael O'Mara Books is a small, family-run, privately owned publishing house in the United Kingdom. Established in London in 1985, by an American expatriate, Michael O'Mara, a native of Philadelphia, Pennsylvania, and his British wife, Lesley, the company focuses on non-fiction books from autobiographies and memoir to colouring. O'Mara Books won the Independent Publishers Guild International Achievement Award in 2007 and the Lambeth Made Charter Mark Award for Best Apprenticeship Employer in 2021.

== History ==
Michael O’Mara Books was founded in July, 1985 and published its first book the same year. The company has since published thousands of titles, producing over one hundred and fifty new books a year across three imprints.

O'Mara Books' first publication was Alastair Burnet's biography of the Queen Mother, entitled The ITN Book of the Queen Mother, which topped the 1985 The Sunday Times bestseller list. One of the publishing house's most influential publications was Diana: Her True Story by Andrew Morton, the second highest-selling authored work in the UK in the 1990s. The publishing house has established a reputation for high-profile autobiographies and biographies (including In Strictest Confidence by Craig Revel Horwood, and My Word is My Bond by Roger Moore), innovative humour and non-fiction (The Wicked Wit series, The Good Bee), as well as children's books, published under the Buster Books imprint. In 2015, they established LOM ART, an art focused imprint that publishes colouring books, journals and gift books.

== Books ==
Michael O'Mara Books publishes non-fiction books for people of all ages. O'Mara Books has a reputation for publishing autobiographies and biographies, with a list that includes Roger Moore, Craig Revel Horwood, Michelle Heaton, Meghan Markle, José Mourinho, Billie Eilish and Harry Styles. Its other genres include memoirs, colouring books, humour, language, lifestyle and science and TV tie-in books such as By Order of the Peaky Blinders and The World of All Things Great and Small. The publishing house's successes include Sunday Times number-one bestseller, Diana: Her True Story by Andrew Morton, published originally in 1998 and re-issued in 2017. It was the biggest non-fiction book of the 90's, going on to sell over 5 millions copies worldwide.

Other successful titles and series include The Wild Remedy by Emma Mitchell, which was featured on BBC's Springwatch and Where's the Unicorn?, an interactive humour title that has sold over 600,000 copies in the worldwide, Lulu Mayo's A Million... colouring books, established in 2015 and has since published 11 more books into the series, I Before E (Except after C) written by Judy Parkinson, which was a Sunday Times top-ten title in 2007, the How To Think Like series, with subjects such as Stephen Hawking, Barack Obama, Albert Einstein and Steve Jobs, Sunday Times bestseller, I Used to Know That by Caroline Taggart which sparked a series of the same name looking at maths, geography, English language and grammar and Crown of Blood: The Deadly Inheritance of Lady Jane Grey by Nicola Tallis, which was published to wide praise.

== Buster Books ==
Buster Books publishes picture books and commercial non-fiction for children aged 0 to11. Its successes include Dr. Maggie's Grand Tour of the Solar System written by Dr Maggie Aderin-Pocock, The Dinosaur Department Store written by Lily Murray and illustrated by Richard Merritt and the Clever Kids series. In 2020 they won the Blue Peter Book Award with Rise Up: Ordinary Kids with Extraordinary Stories written by Amanda Li and continued this success in 2021 when they won the same award with A Day in the Life of a Poo, Gnu and You written by Mike Barfield and illustrated by Jess Bradley. In 2021 they launched the Buster Wellbeing Books with Feeling Good About Me written by Ellen Bailey and Lesley Pemberton, with the aim to bring mindfulness to children.

== LOM ART ==
Established in 2015, LOM ART is an imprint of Michael O'Mara Books that is dedicated to showcasing the most talented and creative artists. They publish artist-led books for people of all ages, from colouring books to mindfulness journals. Its notable authors and illustrators include Kerby Rosanes, Lulu Mayo, Emma Mitchell, Meera Lee Patel and Andrea Zanatelli. In 2021, they published The Kindness Journal written by Jaime Thurston, founder of the charity 52 Lives, with a portion of royalties from the sale of the book being donated to 52 Lives.

== Sustainability ==
In 2021, Michael O’Mara Books became a founding signatory of the Publishing Declares pledge in association with the Publishers Association. The purpose of Publishing Declares is to raise awareness of the sustainability issues most relevant to the UK book and journal publishing industry; to aid the discovery of existing tools and resources and to inspire action that results in sustained behaviour change.

O'Mara Books also created a green logo to print on the back cover of all new books to highlight the support given to environmental charities. The charities supported include Young People’s Trust for the Environment, Surfers Against Sewage, People’s Trust for Endangered Species, The London Wildlife Trust, The David Shepherd Wildlife Foundation, ClientEarth, and The Bloom Association.
