= James Colthurst =

Irish aristocrat, British radiologist (born 1957)

James Colthurst FRCSE
- Born: James Richard Colthurst; 7 March 1957 (age 69); Cork, Ireland
- Education: Eton College
- Alma mater: St Thomas's Hospital Medical School
- Occupations: Radiologist, consultant
- Known for: friendship with Diana, Princess of Wales
- Spouse: Dominique G. Coles
- Children: 2
- Parent: Sir Richard la Touche Colthurst, 9th Baronet
- Family: Colthurst family

James Richard Colthurst FRCSE (born 7 March 1957) is an Irish-born British aristocrat, radiologist, and medical business consultant. He worked as a radiologist at London's St Thomas' Hospital and is a Fellow of the Royal College of Surgeons of Edinburgh. Colthurst was a close friend to Diana, Princess of Wales and served as a "middle-man" between the princess and the writer Andrew Morton, interviewing her for the 1992 book Diana: Her True Story.

== Early life, family, and education ==
Colthurst was born on 7 March 1957, the second son of Sir Richard la Touche Colthurst, 9th Baronet and Janet Georgina Wilson-Wright, a granddaughter of Sir Almroth Wright. He is a member of the Colthurst family, an Anglo-Irish family who were elevated to the baronetage in Ireland in 1744 by George II. On his mother's side, he is a grandnephew of Sir Charles Theodore Hagberg Wright, who was the Librarian of the London Library. He is the great-grandson of the clergyman Charles Henry Hamilton Wright and a great-great-grandson of Nils Wilhelm Almroth, Governor of the Swedish Royal Mint in Stockholm.

Colthurst grew up at Blarney Castle, the family seat in Blarney, Ireland. He was educated at Eton College and, from 1973 to 1974, he rowed for England Youth International. He graduated from St Thomas's Hospital Medical School in London with a bachelor of medicine degree. In 1982, he earned his bachelor of surgery from St Thomas's. In 1992, he obtained a master of business administration degree from Brunel University London.

== Career ==
Colthurst worked as a radiologist at St Thomas' Hospital in London upon finishing medical school there. In 1985, he was appointed as a Fellow of the Royal College of Surgeons of Edinburgh.

He retired from medicine and works as the director of a medical research firm.

== Friendship with the Princess of Wales ==
Colthurst first met Lady Diana Spencer, then seventeen years old, while on a ski trip in Val Claret. The two had shared mutual friends, both moving in aristocratic circles in London. On the trip, Diana twisted her ankle and Colthurst, then a medical student, examined it for her. The two remained close friends for the remainder of Diana's life.

Diana, upon becoming Princess of Wales, visited Colthurst often, both publicly and privately, while he was working at St Thomas' Hospital. In October 1986, while escorting the princess on an official royal visit to St Thomas' Hospital where she opened a new CT scanner in Colthurst's X-ray department, he met royal journalist Andrew Morton. Colthurst was a "middle-man" between the Princess of Wales and Morton, who wrote a biography on the princess in 1992 titled Diana: Her True Story. Colthurst brought the princess questions from Morton and recorded tapes of her answers to bring back to him. Colthurst said of the experience, "She [Diana] was enormously enthusiastic to have her story out there, she knew exactly what she was doing. I'd cycle in, the recorder was in the briefcase, nothing surprising there. I'd go in and we'd normally have a few questions before lunch, we'd have lunch then we'd come out after lunch, I'd clip the microphone on and she'd finish them off." In 1992, shortly before Diana: Her True Story was published, the princess wrote to Colthurst, saying: "Obviously we are preparing for the volcano to erupt and I do feel better equipped to cope with whatever comes our way! Thank you for your belief in me and for taking the trouble to understand this mind—it's such a relief not to be on my own any more and that it's okay to be me."

He was featured in the 2017 Channel 4 documentary Diana: In Her Own Words. In 2018, Colthurst wrote about the Wedding of Prince Harry and Meghan Markle for the Irish Independent, stating that he believed Diana would be "enormously happy" and "extremely proud of her younger son".

== Personal life ==
Colthurst married Dominique G. Coles in 1990. They have two children:

- Leah Alexandra Colthurst (born 23 October 1994)
- Cicely Rachel Colthurst (born 5 June 1997)

He lives at Balsdon Farm House in Inkpen, Berkshire.

== In popular culture ==
Colthurst is portrayed by Oliver Chris in the fifth season of The Crown.
