= Harry: The Interview =

2023 television interview of the Duke of Sussex by Tom Bradby

- Genre: Television interview
- Presented by: Tom Bradby
- Starring: Prince Harry, Duke of Sussex
- Country of origin: United Kingdom
- Original language: English

Production
- Production location: Santa Barbara County, California
- Running time: 95 minutes
- Production company: ITN Productions

Original release
- Network: ITV1
- Release: 8 January 2023

Harry: The Interview is a British television programme that aired on both ITV1 and ITVX on 8 January 2023 to coincide with the release of Prince Harry, Duke of Sussex's autobiography, Spare, which was released on 10 January.

== Background and production ==
Produced by ITN Productions, the programme will see Prince Harry talking to ITV News at Ten presenter Tom Bradby ahead of the book's release. The programme was filmed in California, where the Prince lives with his family, and is one of two interviews to be broadcast on 8 January, the other having been recorded for 60 Minutes on CBS in the United States. Details of the programme, including some footage, were released on 2 January. As part of their promotion for the documentary, ITV said the Prince would go into "unprecedented depth and detail" about his life in and outside the British royal family.

== Content ==
In the interview, Harry stated that he still believed in the monarchy but did not know if he will play a part in its future. He reflected on the moment his father Charles broke the news about his mother's death to him and his brother William, saying that part of the reason he left the UK was to ensure his wife's safety so that the same interaction would not happen between him and his children. Harry mentions that after his mother's death, he only cried once at her burial. He adds that when he was in his 20s he asked his driver to take him through the tunnel in Paris where she was killed at the "same speed" only to realise "It's nothing, just a straight tunnel. I'd always imagined the tunnel was some treacherous passageway, inherently dangerous but it was just a short, simple, no frills tunnel. No reason anyone should ever die inside it." Harry also jokes about the account in his book where he described losing his virginity to "an older woman who liked macho horses."

Harry professes his love for his family in the interview: "love my father. I love my brother. I love my family. I will always do. Nothing of what I've done in this book or otherwise has ever been to any intention to harm them or hurt them," but added that certain members of his family had "decided to get in bed with the devil," i.e. the press, to rehabilitate their image. In the interview Harry points out flaws in his father's ability to handle being a single parent after his mother's death and added "Pa was never made for that. To be fair, he tried." He mentioned that he understood why the royal family needed a relationship with the tabloid press, but he did not agree with it as "There have been decisions that have happened on the other side that have been incredibly hurtful." He added that he was willing to reconcile with his father but "first there needs to be some accountability." He states that could not have been "delusional and paranoid when all the evidence is stacked up," and he was "terrified" about what could happen to him.

On his relationship with his brother William and sister-in-law Catherine, he said that before his marriage to Meghan he was "third wheel to them, which was fun at times but also, I guess slightly awkward." He also alleged that William and Catherine struggled to welcome Meghan into the family as she was an "American actress, divorced, biracial, [there are] all different parts to that and what that can mean." Harry also mentions that William "never tried to dissuade me from marrying Meghan, but he aired some concerns very early. He said you know, 'This is gonna be really hard for you' and I still to this day don't truly understand which part of what he was talking about." He attributed his brother's concerns to his worries about the British press's reaction. Referring to a row between Meghan and Catherine about flower girl dresses ahead of his and Meghan's 2018 wedding which was reported at the time to have left Catherine in tears, Harry stated that the palace was unwilling to put out a statement to correct the narrative because they were probably afraid that people would realise it was the other way around.

Harry mentioned that due to "planting and leaking from other members of the family" in the past six years, "countless books, certainly millions of words have been dedicated to trying to trash my wife and myself to the point of where I had to leave my country." He was unsure whether his family would watch the interview, but hopes any conversations with them afterwards would remain private. He described his grandmother Queen Elizabeth II's funeral as a "really good opportunity to bring the family together," but instead he alleged he received "a really, really horrible reaction from my family members."

Harry addresses the content of Jeremy Clarkson's December 2022 Sun newspaper column on his wife Meghan, describing it as "horrific, hurtful, and cruel". He added that it "encourages men to think that it's acceptable to treat women that way." He expresses his wish to "try and change the press" and said the royal family's "silence" over what he deemed harmful coverage of his family is "deafening" despite the fact that they "defend themselves regularly." On the possibility of forgiving and reconciling with his family, Harry said that "forgiveness is 100% a possibility because I would like to get my father back. I would like to have my brother back." He framed the British press as "an antagonist" responsible for the conflict between them and added that "certain members of my family and the people that work for them are complicit in that conflict." Harry mentions that both he and William were supportive of their father's relationship with his lover at the time Camilla Parker Bowles but did not want him to marry her. He alleged that their father did not respond to their pleas "But she answered. Straight away. Shortly after our private summits with her, she began to play the long game. A campaign aimed marriage, and eventually the Crown, with Pa's blessing we presumed." However, Harry also stated in the interview that what he said in the book wasn’t scathing towards any member of his family, especially not his stepmother.

Harry said that he wished his family was supportive "in the second-darkest moment of my life," adding that "they feel as though it is better to keep us somehow as the villains." Bradby also questioned Harry about accusations aimed at him for invading the privacy of the royal family, to which Harry responded that such accusations would only come from people who "don't want to believe that my family have been briefing the press solidly for well over a decade." When questioned if he and Meghan had accused members of his family of racism during their 2021 interview with Oprah Winfrey, Harry responded "No. The British press said that, right? Did Meghan ever mention 'they're racists'?" He reiterated his earlier claims that "there was concern about his [son's] skin colour," but he would attribute it to "unconscious bias," which he said was different from racism. He believed that pointing out the bias was "an opportunity to learn and grow from that in order so that you are part of the solution rather than part of the problem." He also commented on the conversation between Lady Susan Hussey and Ngozi Fulani, in which Fulani was questioned by Hussey about her origin. He believed Hussey "never meant any harm at all" and condemned the people online and the press's reaction to the incident. He also expressed his joy at the two women's reconciliation, stating "I'm very happy for Ngozi Fulani to be invited into the palace to sit down with Lady Susan Hussey, and to reconcile, because Meghan and I love Susan Hussey."

Harry described his memoir and his Netflix docuseries as "essential, for historical fact and significance." He added that "I want a family, not an institution." When asked if he would attend his father's coronation in May 2023, he responded "There is a lot that can happen between now and then." On the possibility of reconciling with the royal family and extending an olive branch, Harry said: "The ball is in their court. The door is always open. There is a lot to be discussed and I really hope that they are willing to sit down and talk about it."

== Reception ==
=== Audience viewership ===
According to data published by BARB, the interview had a peak audience of 4.5 million and an average audience of 4.1 million, one third of the number who tuned in to watch his 2021 interview with Oprah Winfrey. The figures were described as "disappointing" by Deadline compared to the number of people who tuned in to watch his 2021 interview. By contrast, Episode 2 of the third series of the crime drama Happy Valley, which aired on BBC One in the same 9.00pm timeslot, drew an audience of 5.2 million. The interview was also broadcast in 77 territories across Europe, Africa, the Middle East, Australia, and parts of Asia and South America.

=== Critical response ===
Julie Burchill wrote for The Spectator: "Though Harry talks a lot about 'growth', this was a portrait of a lost young man for whom the getting of wisdom is about as likely as Meghan serving up a Full English (with builder's tea) for breakfast." She added that he wanted "to be the hero of his own story, those who oppose him in any way must be painted as villains, for where is the epic 'journey' if everyone involved is simply a well-meaning, flawed human, trying to do their best and sometimes getting it wrong?" In a review for The Independent, Sean O'Grady was sympathetic about Harry and his wife Meghan's grievances about the press, but believed they do not "appear to understand how the media works." He added: "They seem to think the House of Windsor rules rather than reigns. They are wrong in claiming that the rest of the family and the Buckingham Palace staff have ever been in any position to do anything about the media, or indeed, to answer Harry's charge more directly, to control any leaking from various royal households." Writing for the same newspaper, Nick Hilton gave the programme two out of five stars and described it as "Prince Harry's latest primetime moan." He added that Bradby does not "leave a boot unlicked... It is a level of sycophancy typical of a product that is stage-managed and unchallenging from start to finish."

Lucy Mangan of The Guardian also gave the interview two out of five stars, but found Harry "charming" and "articulate" and predicted that "his story will appeal to the younger demographic." In a review for The Times, Carol Midgley questioned what the purpose of the interview was and wondered "when this whingeing will stop?... OK, we heard him say repeatedly that he wants 'accountability', whatever that means, but what's the endgame in hanging all this dirty family washing on the line? Revenge? Reconciliation? Your own regular slot on Loose Women?" In her review for The Telegraph, Anita Singh argued that despite Harry's claims of being in "a good headspace" he came off as "furious, defensive and just plain sad, it was a difficult watch." She praised Bradby for not being "a conduit for [Harry's] grievances" and instead questioning what he was hearing. Singh added that the summary of Harry's statements was "Nothing is [his] fault, and almost everything can be blamed on the press." In response to Harry's statements that he and Meghan had not accused his family of racism in their interview with Oprah Winfrey and it was the press who created that narrative, Good Morning Britain host Richard Madeley criticised the couple for allowing the press to run with the story and not correcting it for years. Pointing out Harry's supposed unhappiness when his family "fails to correct mistruths in the media," Emily Giffin wondered why Harry had allowed the narrative to go on for almost two years.

=== Royal family's response ===
Sources close to King Charles III responded to Harry's claims by insisting that he loves both of his sons and has kept communication channels open throughout the last few years, despite their relationship being occasionally tense. The two reportedly met several times during Queen Elizabeth II's Platinum Jubilee celebrations in June 2022. Sources also mentioned that a reconciliation between Harry and his family was impossible "because of the risk that anything they say being put in the public domain by Harry, potentially for commercial benefit. There has been a complete breakdown of trust."

== See also ==
- Charles: The Private Man, the Public Role, 1994 documentary and interview with Charles, Prince of Wales
- "An Interview with HRH The Princess of Wales", 1995 interview with Diana, Princess of Wales
- "Prince Andrew & the Epstein Scandal", a 2019 interview with Prince Andrew, Duke of York
- Oprah with Meghan and Harry, 2021 interview with Prince Harry and Meghan, Duchess of Sussex
