= Sir Nicholas Colthurst, 3rd Baronet =

Anglo-Irish member of the Irish House of Commons

Sir Nicholas Colthurst, 3rd Baronet (died July 1795) was an Anglo-Irish member of the Irish House of Commons for St Johnstown in 1783–1790 and Clonakilty in 1792–1795.

In 1788 he served as High Sheriff of County Cork - a position that his father and brother (the 2nd Baronet) had also held.

He was the younger son of Sir John Colthurst, 1st Baronet and Lady Charlotte FitzMaurice. He married Harriet La Touche, the daughter of Rt. Hon. David La Touche, on 8 May 1788. They had three children, Elizabeth, Charlotte and Sir Nicholas Conway Colthurst, 4th Baronet. Elizabeth married Edward St Lawrence, Archdeacon of Ross.

Baronetage of Ireland
| Preceded by John Colthurst | Baronet (of Ardrum); 1775–1795 | Succeeded by Nicholas Colthurst |
