= Who Shot Phil? =

EastEnders storyline from 2001

The "Who Shot Phil?" storyline is one of the biggest in EastEnders history.

"Who Shot Phil?" was a storyline of the BBC soap opera EastEnders which began on 1 March 2001 and climaxed on 5 April 2001.

== Background ==
The storyline centred around one of EastEnders' longest-running characters, Phil Mitchell (played by Steve McFadden), who had first appeared in February 1990. The build-up to the storyline occurred throughout 2000 and into 2001. The character saw a more menacing side to his personality beginning to surface. Phil's behaviour thus earned him a number of sworn enemies in Albert Square. These included his ex-girlfriend; her new boyfriend Mark Fowler; former step-son Ian Beale; former business partner Dan Sullivan; and love rival Steve Owen.

By 2001, the character had become one of the soap's nastiest villains. In an interview with The Guardian, McFadden commented on his alter ego's descent into villainy: "Phil's been had over by a lot of people, so now he feels like he can do it back. It's his history".

The character finally received his comeuppance in one of EastEnders most highly anticipated storylines, dubbed "Who Shot Phil?". Phil was shot outside his home in an episode that first aired on 1 March 2001 (penned by scriptwriter Christopher Reason and directed by Paul Annett).

The storyline has been described as a "Dallas-style" whodunnit mystery, echoing the attempted murder of J. R. Ewing (Larry Hagman) in the American TV soap opera Dallas in 1980. Various key characters were in the frame for the deed and viewers were left guessing for weeks as to which of them was the real culprit. Several outcomes were allegedly filmed and it was reported that only a few TV executives knew the identity of the would-be assassin — even the other actors were kept in the dark, being given only their own scripts. Script writers were reportedly given private security after a writer's laptop was stolen in what was believed to be an attempt to gain the identity of the assailant. The storyline captivated the public's imagination leading to thousands of bets being placed at the bookies across the UK — bookmaker William Hill said that around 50,000 bets were made on who was responsible.

It was revealed on 5 April 2001 that Lisa Shaw (Lucy Benjamin) — Phil's former girlfriend — was the culprit. The episode caused the third-largest TV pickup power surge on record, and the UEFA Cup semi-final between Liverpool and Barcelona broadcast straight after on BBC One was postponed for 15 minutes to accommodate a special 40 minute edition of the soap.

== Plot ==
=== Events leading up to the shooting ===
Steve Owen (Martin Kemp) was due to marry Mel Healy (Tamzin Outhwaite) on 1 March 2001, but he found out that she had sex with Phil Mitchell (Steve McFadden) — one of his deadliest enemies. Steve later decided to go ahead with the wedding. Steve's elderly mother Barbara (Sheila Hancock) arrived at the registry office to attend her son's wedding, and took an immediate dislike to Mel. Barbara also took a liking to Phil, who confirmed her suspicions, further angering Steve. When the wedding guests return to The Queen Victoria public house for the wedding reception, Barbara tells Mel about Steve's first girlfriend who cheated on him at the age of 16. Barbara implied that Mel is that sort of girl.

Dan Sullivan (Craig Fairbrass) re-appeared in Albert Square that evening after months away and demanded money from Phil, who had always despised him for leaving him with just £5 when selling his stake in The Queen Vic.

Ian Beale (Adam Woodyatt) started to question Phil about his fling with Mel (who had briefly been Ian's wife). Phil told Ian that Mel was good, but not as good as his mother Kathy (Gillian Taylforth), who was once Phil's wife. Phil then left the e20 nightclub and Ian followed him out, taunting him. Ian picked up a metal rod to intimidate Phil, who lost his temper and began to throttle Ian with the rod, and only stopped when Mel shouted at him.

When Phil returned home, he received a hoax phone call from an anonymous caller. Dan was then seen walking away from a nearby telephone box. The scene then returned to Steve's office, where Steve's gun had disappeared from the drawer where it was being kept. As the wedding reception drew to a close, Barbara finally lost her temper with Mel and called her a tart. Before leaving, she stubbed her cigarette out on the wedding cake. Steve and Mel got into Charlie Slater's (Derek Martin) taxi and were ready to depart for the airport to begin their honeymoon, but Steve went back to ensure that Billy Mitchell (Perry Fenwick) was keeping everything under control at e20. The shooting taking place in the time he was gone.

Phil's doorbell rung and he opened the door to find nobody there. As he turned around to re-enter his house, he was shot in the back and fell down the steps.

Phil was found minutes later by Beppe di Marco (Michael Greco). He was rushed to hospital, where doctors performed an emergency operation to remove the bullet. Phil's mother Peggy (Barbara Windsor) was told that there was no guarantee that Phil will recover. The police later visited Ian in his fish and chip shop, but they left after he told them to go and question Steve — who was now at Heathrow Airport waiting for a flight to the Caribbean.

=== Suspects ===
- Lisa Shaw (Lucy Benjamin) - Phil's ex-girlfriend. She had attacked Phil with a plate earlier in the week, and was appalled with him for his abusive mistreatment towards her. Lisa was later revealed to be the person responsible.
- Mark Fowler (Todd Carty) - Lisa’s new boyfriend. He was resentful towards Phil for his callous treatment of her.
- Dan Sullivan (Craig Fairbrass) - Phil's former best-friend and business partner. The pair embarked on a conflict after Phil had conned Dan's share of The Queen Vic, causing Dan to swear revenge on Phil. Prior to the shooting, Dan was seen leaving a telephone box after Phil received a hoax call.
- Ian Beale (Adam Woodyatt) - Phil's stepson and arch-nemesis. Ian hated Phil for causing him to be subjugated to financial bankruptcy, in which Ian had consequently lost all of his assets as a result. They had also got into a fight just hours before the shooting. Ian was then found under the bushes shortly after Phil was shot.
- Steve Owen (Martin Kemp) - Phil's love rival. Steve had just found out that Phil had previously had sex with his wife Mel, and a gun that had been hidden in Steve's office went missing just before Phil was shot. His mother had also taken a liking to Phil, much to Steve's disgust.
- Mel Owen (Tamzin Outhwaite) - Phil’s one night stand lover and Steve's fiance-turned-wife. On Mel and Steve’s wedding day, Phil decided to tell Steve that he had slept with Mel. She is furious with Phil for this. Mel also dislikes Phil for mistreating her best friend Lisa whilst they were together.

=== Events following the shooting ===
Three weeks after Phil's shooting, he was still in hospital recovering from his injuries. Steve and Mel returned from their honeymoon and as soon as they stepped into The Queen Vic, Peggy accused Steve of trying to murder her son. Phil's godson Jamie (Jack Ryder) later tried to attack Steve, but Mark and Lisa dragged him away. Steve was soon arrested on suspicion of attempted murder, and admitted to the police that he has never got on with Phil, but did not want to kill him, and insisted that he was away from the Square by the time Phil was shot. Steve suggested that the police should quiz Dan, who was meanwhile visiting Phil in hospital and taunting him. On 5 April 2001 Phil discharged himself from hospital, five weeks after being shot. Returning to the square at night, he went to confront his assailant. Each suspect received a knock on their front door with the audience oblivious as to whose door he was knocking on, the episode ending from the shooter's point of view and Phil saying to the unidentified person 'Guess Who?.' The beginning of the next episode revealed the shooter to be Lisa. A tense and intimidating conversation followed, with Lisa unsure if Phil knew it was her. But he soon made it clear he knew it was her, having spotted her running away after he'd been shot. He became threatening towards her and she admitted to not knowing what she was doing and had shot him in a crazy rage. She took the gun from Steve's office. Wanting the gun, Phil forced Lisa to retrieve it from inside a game of Monopoly, and Phil threatened to kill her with it. Lisa soon confesses that she shot Phil, but insisted that she still loved him. This made Phil understand that he had driven her to it and decided to forgive her. Mark showed up at the house and learned the truth, and the three of them vowed to keep the truth to themselves. Phil cleared the gun of Lisa's fingerprints and left, but letting Lisa know that he was sorry for his treatment of her.

Phil decided to conspire against Dan and Steve in the hope of getting them both out of the picture, wanting Dan convicted of attempted murder and Steve framed as his accomplice, as the gun belonged to Steve. Strangely enough, Dan was already plotting to swindle Phil and was making regular visits to both Phil and Jamie, demanding money. Jamie was stunned when Phil told him to pay Dan following one showdown between them. He feared Phil was giving into Dan but Phil was simply playing him. Phil made contact with Dan's former crime boss, Ritchie Stringer, and conspired with him to ensure Dan ended up with the gun that had shot him. Dan was later provided with the gun, not knowing he was being set up and decided on pressure from Stringer that he would kill Phil if he refused him again. Dan met with Phil at the Arches, Phil already having tipped off the police that Dan was planning to kill him. Although both Phil and Jamie were threatened by an armed Dan, Steve having been lured there by Phil watched from the door and quickly left to avoid getting caught up in the confrontation. The police quickly arrived in the Square and arrested Dan on suspicion of attempted murder. He was charged and remanded in custody. Dan went on trial at the end of July, and Steve agreed to back up Phil's plot to frame Dan, but at the same time he taunted Jamie, vowing that Phil would soon be caught for trying to frame Dan. Steve took the witness stand and testified that he heard Dan vowing to 'shoot through' Steve and put Phil out of business. Meanwhile, Steve's mother Barbara died and while he was clearing out her flat, the jury found Dan not guilty of attempted murder.

The week after Dan's release, Steve entered his office at e20 to find the furniture turned over and the safe open, and Mel had disappeared. Steve soon guessed that Mel had been kidnapped by Dan, and persuaded Phil to help him in his quest to get her back. Steve phoned Dan and heard Mel screaming in the background. Dan later phoned back and demanded a £200,000 ransom for Mel's release; exactly £100,000 each from both Steve and Phil. Soon enough, Dan used the kidnapping to make Mel realise what Steve was really like and told him about his recent fling with an unseen woman called Karen. Phil soon obtained the £100,000 for Mel's release and also took possession of a gun, intent on finishing Dan off for good. When he arrived at Dan's flat, Phil got the drop on Dan with the gun and was about to shoot him when a bound and gagged Mel suddenly turned off the lights - and Dan knocked Phil out before he could pull the trigger. Dan then turned the gun on Phil, but when he pulled the trigger, Phil discovered Dan had emptied it as Mel had convinced him not to kill him. Dan trapped Phil in the apartment and he and Mel then left the flat after Dan got his £100,000. Mel was then released and Dan offered her a share of the money, which she took. The police were summoned to arrest Dan, but by the time they arrived, Dan was gone. Phil managed to free himself and returned to the square.

Back in Albert Square, Mel lost her temper with Steve and accused him of shooting Phil as well as framing Dan. She also informed him that she knew about his affair with Karen, and later set fire to e20 before throwing her wedding ring at Steve and leaving Albert Square in a taxi. They eventually got back together just two months later; however, on the day of both their first wedding anniversary and Phil's shooting, Steve was killed in a vehicle explosion after a high-speed car chase with Phil during their final confrontation.

== Reception ==
Despite the outcome having been leaked by an e-mail from an unidentified BBC employee, the climax of the plotline, broadcast on 5 April 2001, was watched by 19.8 million people according to BBC figures (nearly three quarters of all television viewers), while the first show in the plot arc attracted 17 million viewers. The National Grid reported that the third highest power surge on record followed immediately after the end of the climactic show (beaten only by the 1990 FIFA World Cup finals and 1984 climax of The Thorn Birds). The kick-off of a UEFA Cup semi-final football game was delayed in order to avoid a clash with the scheduled programme. The episode was the second most-watched non-sport programme of the 2000s, behind an episode of Only Fools and Horses.

The plot was compared favourably in the media to "Who shot J.R.?", the popular 1980 Dallas plot involving the shooting of J.R. Ewing. At the 2001 TV Quick Awards, magazine readers voted Who Shot Phil? as the year's top soap storyline. The storyline also won the Most Dramatic Storyline award at the Inside Soap Awards in 2001. The storyline was featured in heat magazine's review of the 2000s, as their 49th greatest event of the decade.
