= Lisa Fowler =

Fictional character from EastEnders

- EastEnders character
- Portrayed by: Lucy Benjamin
- Duration: 1998–2003, 2010, 2017, 2019–2020, 2023
- First appearance: Episode 1704; 7 December 1998
- Last appearance: Episode 6735; 20 July 2023
- Introduced by: Matthew Robinson (1998); Louise Berridge (2003); Bryan Kirkwood (2010); Sean O'Connor (2017); Jon Sen (2019); Chris Clenshaw (2023)
- Spin-off appearances: EastEnders: The Podcast (2018)
In-universe information
- Other names: Lisa Shaw
- Occupation: Market inspector
- Family: Fowler
- Father: Johnathan Shaw
- Mother: Eleanor Shaw
- Husband: Mark Fowler (2002–2004)
- Daughters: Louise Mitchell
- Granddaughters: Peggy Mitchell Jnr

Lisa Fowler (also Shaw) is a fictional character from the BBC soap opera EastEnders, played by Lucy Benjamin. The character was introduced as a "home-wrecking blonde" by executive producer Matthew Robinson on 7 December 1998. The character made her initial departure on 3 October 2002, when she was written out by producer Louise Berridge.

Berridge later reintroduced the character on two occasions in 2003. Despite several reports stating she would return, Benjamin did not reprise the role until 2010 when Bryan Kirkwood brought the character back for a single episode on 5 August 2010. The actress reprised the role again in 2017 for a brief stint, returning on 21 July 2017 and departing on 3 August 2017. On 27 May 2019, it was announced that Benjamin would once again be reprising the role for a "specific storyline" and Lisa returned on 2 September 2019. She departed once again on 24 January 2020. On 23 May 2023, it was announced that Benjamin had signed up to reprise the role for another short stint later in the summer, alongside Lisa's granddaughter Peggy Taylor. They returned on 10 July and departed on 20 July 2023.

Lisa is characterised as "a loyal, romantic Earth Mother" who is "feisty, independent and ambitious". Initially, show scriptwriters and BBC controller of drama, Mal Young, doubted Benjamin's casting in the role. However, after a volatile relationship with Phil Mitchell (Steve McFadden), Lisa became an "eternal victim". The characters became instrumental in one of EastEnders most highly publicised and anticipated storylines, dubbed Who Shot Phil? in 2001, in which an unknown assailant guns down Phil. An estimated 23 million viewers watched Lisa confess to Phil's attempted murder, causing the third-largest power surge on record. Other storylines included Lisa's pregnancy with Phil's child, in which she opted not to tell him and claimed that her partner, Mark Fowler (Todd Carty), was the father, giving birth to Louise Mitchell (Rachel Cox/Brittany Papple/Tilly Keeper); in the show's Christmas 2001 episodes, Louise's parentage is revealed. In Lisa's returns, the storylines have centred around her daughter Louise's pregnancy, falling out with and coping with best friend Mel Owen's (Tamzin Outhwaite) death, a feud with Sharon Watts (Letitia Dean) and partially making amends with Phil.

== Creation and development ==
=== Casting ===
The character's arrival was announced by the press in November 1998. She was one of Executive Producer Matthew Robinson's introductions, and was described as a "home-wrecking blonde". According to actress Lucy Benjamin, who played Lisa, the scriptwriters had doubts about casting her in the role: "I just knew in my heart that I'd be able to do it well. And I desperately wanted the security of a regular income. But after the audition they kept me hanging on for such a long time. They tortured me by saying yes then saying no. It's the only job I've ever cried about when I thought I didn't have it." Benjamin said that she was overjoyed when she was eventually given the part. In 2010, Matthew Robinson discussed Lisa's introduction with Walford Web, suggesting that Lisa and several other new characters introduced were an attempt to fill in character gaps in the soap resulting from a large number of axings. Lisa was conceptualised as a "totty" contingent. He indicated that the casting of Benjamin had been awkward, as BBC controller of drama Mal Young was hesitant about her hiring. He eventually relented and, according to Robinson, admitted after seeing her in the role that "she was, after all, a great asset to the show".

=== Personality ===
Prior to the 2000s, Lucy Benjamin described Lisa Shaw, as "feisty, independent and ambitious". Later, she described her as "a loyal, romantic Earth Mother". It was revealed through dialogue on-screen that Lisa had nursed her mother through terminal cancer, and that she had not lost her virginity until the age of 28, when she came to Walford.

The character's demeanour altered somewhat circa 2000. Due to her romantic pairing with Phil Mitchell, she became "mentally battered". Rupert Smith, author of EastEnders: 20 years in Albert Square, classified the character as an "eternal victim": one who endures misfortune and misery, and is an endless sufferer. He adds, "She was intelligent, beautiful and young — and so, of course, Lisa had to lie down and let men walk all over her [...] a snivelling, suicidal wreck." Benjamin has noted that her character was "constantly crying".

=== Relationship with Phil Mitchell ===
Lisa became more prominently featured in 1999, when she was paired romantically with Phil Mitchell (Steve McFadden). The relationship was scripted as problematic, and included storylines about miscarriage, emotional and mental abuse, and infidelity, when Phil slept with Lisa's best friend, Mel Healy (Tamzin Outhwaite).

One of EastEnders' most highly anticipated storylines involved the couple. "Who Shot Phil?" saw Phil Mitchell gunned down outside his home in March 2001 in a Dallas-style whodunnit mystery. Various key characters were in the frame for the deed, and viewers were left guessing for weeks as to which one was the real culprit. Several outcomes were allegedly filmed, and it was reported that only a few TV executives knew the identity of the would-be assassin; even the actors were kept in the dark. A spokesman commented, "The cast are only getting their own scripts. They are not being told anyone else's storylines. Not even Phil knows who shot him. It's top secret." Scriptwriters were reportedly given private security after a writer's laptop was stolen, in what was believed to be an attempt to gain the identity of the assailant. The storyline captivated the public's imagination, leading to thousands of bets being placed at the bookies across the UK: bookmaker William Hill said there was about 50,000 bets on who was responsible for the shooting.

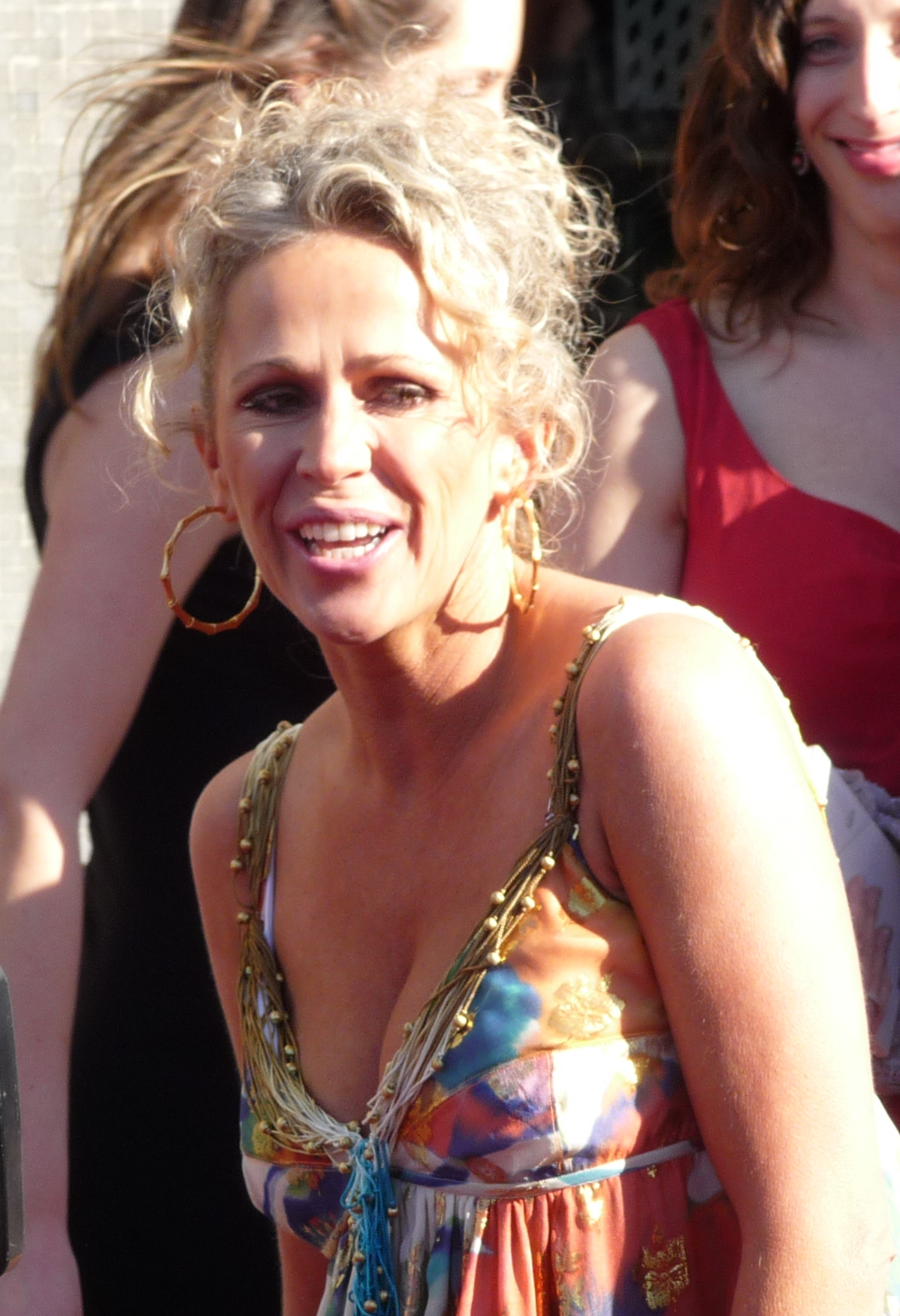
Lucy Benjamin (pictured) found it difficult to keep Lisa being Phil Mitchell's shooter a secret.

An estimated 22 million viewers watched EastEnders on 5 April 2001 to find out that Lisa – Phil's spurned ex-girlfriend – was the culprit. The episode caused the third-largest power surge on record, and the Liverpool and Barcelona UEFA Cup semi-final was postponed for 15 minutes to accommodate a special 40-minute edition of the soap.

Lucy Benjamin told the Daily Star that keeping the secret that her character was responsible for the attempted murder had been the "worst two months of her life". She commented to The Mirror, "For two months I've carried this secret and it's been tough, really hard. I've had to lie to my colleagues — all the suspects were told to say it wasn't us. I've become very good at lying! The lies went on and on. The first person I told that it wasn't me was Todd Carty, who plays Mark [Fowler]. I thought he was a good chap to try my lies on to see if he believed it! And he did. I was delighted that it was me. I think Lisa had every reason to do it". At the time, Benjamin expressed fear that the high-profile storyline would spell the end of her character, who she had thought would be imprisoned. However, in a further plot twist, Phil framed Dan Sullivan (Craig Fairbrass) for the shooting. Subsequent storylines involved in Lisa and Phil's narratives surrounded Lisa's pregnancy. In the storyline, Lisa, secretly expecting Phil's baby, married Mark, and claimed the baby was his. This secret was revealed in the Christmas Day 2001 episodes.

=== Departure (2002) ===
In June 2002, Lucy Benjamin was axed from her role of Lisa, whose departing storyline revolved around the rekindling of her romance with Phil. After beginning an affair, she left Mark, taking her daughter to live with the Mitchells. However, Lisa realised she had made a mistake when Phil and his family began excluding her from her daughter's life; she absconded with the baby in October 2002. In a subsequent plot, Phil retrieved his daughter off-screen, chasing Lisa to Portugal, and returning with Lisa and Louise's passport.

=== Guest stints (2003–2017) ===
In January 2003, the BBC announced that Lucy Benjamin would reprise the role of Lisa for a special set of episodes that revealed Lisa's fate in flashbacks. The episodes were filmed on-location in and around Albufeira on the Portuguese Algarve. It was claimed that several endings to the episodes had been filmed, and that the outcome was a "closely guarded secret". Despite initial claims that Lisa would be killed off in the episodes, this did not occur; instead, Lisa gave Phil custody of Louise after he convinced her she was unstable, and threatened to tell the police that she had once shot him if she returned to England.

However, in June 2003, it was confirmed that Lisa would once again be returning to the serial. Benjamin said, "I couldn't believe it when I got the call a few months ago to ask if I would return to Walford. I didn't think Lisa would give up baby Lou without one last fight." The return storyline was temporary, allowing Lisa to usurp Phil and once again take custody of her daughter, with the help of Den Watts (Leslie Grantham). The character then disappeared, exiting in November 2003.

Following this exit, numerous press reports suggested that the character would be returning to the serial again; these turned out to be false, with an EastEnders spokesperson saying in 2006 and 2007 that there were no current plans to bring the character back.

When asked if she would return in 2004, Benjamin said, "I loved Lisa. She was a great character and I loved playing all those story lines. It was a wonderful opportunity for me but all that angst and that drama can sometimes get to you. She hasn't been killed off. Loads of characters are revived and brought back but I don't know if it's something I'd want to do again at the moment. It still feels like only yesterday I was there and it's good to kind of recharge your batteries and get out there and do other things. But I love the show and I'd never say never! And I liked playing Lisa. I thought she was a great character so you just don't know."

In April 2010, it was reported that Lisa would return for a single episode later in the year in a bid to retrieve Louise from Phil, who gained custody of her earlier in the year. Benjamin said of her return: "I'm really looking forward to returning to EastEnders for this episode. It will be great to see some familiar faces and work alongside old friends again." Executive producer Bryan Kirkwood commented, "Lucy's character Lisa was responsible for one of the biggest cliffhanger episodes in EastEnders, so it's a real treat to have her back on screen," while a spokesperson for the show added, "Lisa Fowler was a major part of Phil's life – she knows him as well as anyone, so she won't be happy about him looking after his daughter. With their history, you know that this storyline is going to be an explosive episode in the Mitchells' history." The episode was broadcast on 5 August 2010.

Discussing her brief return, Benjamin said, "What I liked about doing this storyline was that it did explain where Lisa had been. When I was watching it, I was thinking 'Where's her mother? Where is Lisa? It's just ridiculous'. But it does make sense. She is mentally unstable and she does have times like that and the little girl is old enough to make her own decisions and say, 'I want to live with my dad now'. So she had to let her go. I liked that I was able to come back and defend myself because Lisa was kind of being slaughtered in the Square for being a rubbish mum!"

It was reported on 20 July 2017 that Benjamin had reprised the role for a "surprise" appearance; she was expected to be on screen until August. Lisa returns to care for Louise after she is seriously injured, arriving at the hospital in the closing moments of the episode. Steve McFadden (Phil) also returned to the serial in the episodes following Lisa's return, and a show insider commented, "When that hospital door starts to open, [the audience will] be on tenterhooks to see who has rushed to help Louise. When it turns out to be Lisa, rather than Phil, there will be gasps of shock. It's such a brilliant surprise." The show made no official confirmation of the reports, although Lisa returned in the episode broadcast in the United Kingdom on 21 July 2017.

It was subsequently confirmed that Lisa would be returning for a "brief stint", and would share scenes with Phil, following his return. On her return, Benjamin commented, "It was great to be back at EastEnders as it has been such a long time since I had been there. I loved being back in Elstree for the few weeks I was there, seeing old friends again and working with really talented people. I loved every minute of it."

Benjamin's agent was approached by the show with a potential return for Lisa, which intrigued Benjamin, who had reservations about returning, as she felt the character was "a chapter that was closed". Benjamin was later contacted personally by Liza Mellody, the show's story producer, who explained a possible storyline that appealed to Benjamin. She found the storyline "too good an offer to refuse" and agreed to the return, safe in the knowledge that "it was absolutely worth coming back for".

The actress struggled to keep her return a secret, and only informed her mother and husband. She called the secret "all very cloak and dagger" at the studios, and revealed that she was told to enter through a separate entrance and wear oversized sunglasses. On show scripts, Lisa's lines were listed under the character 'Sam' and, whenever Benjamin was filming, monitors that relay what is being filmed to sets are switched off.

Benjamin felt "a little apprehensive" on her first day back filming with the serial, but settled back in after 20 minutes, and enjoyed working with McFadden, Letitia Dean (Sharon Mitchell), Natalie Cassidy (Sonia Fowler), and Dean Gaffney (Robbie Jackson) again, which she compared to "being with old friends". Benjamin teased "great" scenes between Lisa and Sharon, Phil and Sonia, opining that it is "reminiscent of historical stuff". The actress also stated that she missed the workload associated with filming the serial and commented, "It was great to get my teeth back into doing what I do, really." Benjamin developed "a really lovely connection" with Tilly Keeper, who portrays Louise Mitchell, and found her "marvellous" to work with, calling her a "professional". They had never met before working together on EastEnders. The actress hoped her return has "a great impact" as she felt a "sense of responsibility" with portraying the storyline. She called the storyline dramatic and explained, "you'll see a lot of old Lisa being played out".

Benjamin explained the reasons for Lisa's return, saying she is back because Sonia contacted her, who "feels Louise needs her [Lisa] to be there" and Louise asks for Lisa in "a state of upset", where "she's a bit delirious". This allows Lisa the "choice about whether or not she wants to be involved." It was reported that Lisa would not get "a great reception", believing that Lisa has "been a bad mum", but Benjamin defended Lisa "not being there for Louise" as she "hasn't been informed about what's going on [...] and if things were going terribly wrong she'd know about it." Lisa has been absent from Louise's life due to "her own personal issues" and Lisa "thinks it's in Louise's best interest to have stayed away." Sharon will not "be particularly keen to see her for her own reasons", and Lisa staying away is seen as the best for Phil and his side of the family.

Benjamin said when it comes to Lisa and Phil, "there's always going to be drama [...] there's going to be fireworks" as Phil "isn't Lisa's favourite person" and "in true Lisa and Phil fashion, it will be quite explosive." Lisa sees Phil as the person that "triggers episodes of things going wrong for her" and the one who has "caused all of the problems going on her life", caused by him taking Louise away from her, which leads to her wariness around him, as she knows "what he's capable of doing." Benjamin believes Lisa and Phil will never "be the best of friends or see eye-to-eye", but Louise should be the person they put first and be adults for. Lisa sees Sharon as "the right woman for Phil" and regards her as "lovely", so she needs Sharon as an "ally" in order to help her relationship with Louise, but knows Sharon is "no fool", who "will stand her ground."

Benjamin added that Lisa "feels very guilty" about leaving Louise, and being excluded from her life, but her "driving force is her unconditional love for her child"; she has "hard times ahead with Louise, explaining why she hasn't been there. I think she just hopes her daughter will need her and see she's better off having her mum in her life."

=== Reintroduction (2019) ===
On 27 May 2019, it was announced that Benjamin would once again be reprising the role for a longer stint. Lisa, who was last seen in 2017, would be returning after discovering that her daughter Louise is pregnant. The friendship between Lisa and Mel Owen (Tamzin Outhwaite) would also be revisited, a friendship that was prominent during their original tenure in the soap.

On returning to the soap, Benjamin said: "Going back to EastEnders feels like going home. I love and adore playing Lisa, and am looking forward to seeing what's in store for her this time." The show's executive producer Jon Sen added: "Lisa is one of the most enduringly popular characters in the history of the show. We're chuffed Lucy has agreed to come back for a thrilling storyline that takes us into the heart of her past on the Square."

=== Departure (2020) ===
Benjamin confirmed during an interview on This Morning on 8 January 2020 that she had filmed her final scenes as Lisa, but was always "open for a return". In the interview, she also said that there would be no reunion between Lisa and Phil.

On Lisa's departure storyline, Benjamin said: "All Lisa knows is Keanu is the father of Sharon's baby and he's left the Square. That is all still to play out, the fact Lisa finds out more sinister things have happened to Keanu". Speaking about whether the door had been left open, Benjamin confessed: "I don't even know if I can talk about that. I knew I was going back for a stint and I've completed that stint." Benjamin commented, "It's so difficult. Lisa doesn't seem to go away, she's the bad penny."

Benjamin also said that she had enjoyed working with Tamzin Outhwaite, who played her on-screen best friend Mel Owen, once again. She said: "When Jon Sen put the call into me and said this is the storyline I said fantastic I get to work with Tamzin again and being with my mate was a glorious thing to get involved in. It was a massive storyline. A really big deal and done really well. Up until Mel died we had a great time exploring those characters and the dynamics between them. We got people who had never witnessed Mel and Lisa together seeing them for the first time."

== Storylines ==
=== 1998–2003 ===
Lisa Shaw first appeared in Albert Square as a trainee market inspector, but clashes with her boss Michael Rose (Russell Floyd) because of her poor time-keeping. However, she starts to fall for him, and the pair strike up an affair. Lisa soon begins to feel guilty, and demands that Michael chooses between her and his wife Susan (Tilly Vosburgh). Michael initially chooses Lisa, but does not tell Susan, and Lisa threatens to tell her. To escape the breakdown of his marriage, he flees Walford with Susan in February 1999, leaving heartbroken Lisa behind.

She later makes friends with Mel Healy (Tamzin Outhwaite) and moves in with Mark Fowler (Todd Carty). Although Mark has feelings for her, Lisa does not notice, having a fling with Gianni di Marco (Marc Bannerman) and a relationship with Phil Mitchell (Steve McFadden), resulting in Lisa's pregnancy. Phil asks her to have an abortion, but she refuses, so he asks her to move in after coming round to the idea, but she miscarries, and blames Phil. Lisa loses her job when Ian Beale (Adam Woodyatt) reports her for being absent, so she becomes dependent on Phil. He is happy with the situation, but she loses her confidence and becomes jealous of Phil's former wife, Kathy Mitchell (Gillian Taylforth) and son Ben (Morgan Whittle), hiding letters and a video from them. This irritates Phil, and he has sex with Mel when she is upset, following a fight with Lisa on Christmas Day. Regretting this, Mel agrees not to tell Lisa, but does so when Lisa says she intends to get pregnant again. Devastated, Lisa ends her relationship with Phil and moves in with Mark, but she is already pregnant. She keeps this secret, as Phil keeps belittling her, and on Mel and Steve Owen's (Martin Kemp) wedding night, Phil says that he never loved her, and suggests Mel give her tips in the bedroom. In revenge, Lisa steals a gun from the e20 nightclub and shoots Phil. He survives, and confronts her after leaving hospital, but realises that he drove her to it, and frames his enemy Dan Sullivan (Craig Fairbrass) instead. Wanting to keep Phil away from her child, Lisa and Mark marry, claiming that he is the baby's father. Everyone believes it, and their romance becomes real. However, Lisa gives birth to her baby, named Louise, and Lisa tells Sharon Watts (Letitia Dean) that Phil is Louise's father. Sharon, however, tells Phil that Louise is his daughter, and he forces them to accept he will be part of Louise's life. Despite initial animosity, when Lisa sees Phil with Louise, old feelings resurface, and they eventually reconcile. Following an affair, Lisa leaves Mark, and goes to live with Phil.

However, Phil wants Louise, not Lisa, and when she realises this, she and Louise emigrate to Portugal. Phil finds Lisa, and brings Louise home after blackmailing Lisa about shooting him, making her think that she is unstable and an unfit mother. Phil leaves her standing on the edge of a cliff, and she is presumed dead. On Phil's wedding day to Kate Morton (Jill Halfpenny), Lisa returns to reclaim her daughter. He is difficult, leading her to plan to shoot him again, but Den Watts (Leslie Grantham) persuades her to let him do it. He and his son, Dennis Rickman (Nigel Harman), frame Phil for armed robbery, and Lisa gains custody when he is imprisoned. She leaves the Square with Louise.

=== 2010 ===
Several years later, Jack Branning (Scott Maslen), a former policeman, tells Phil that Lisa and Louise are living in South East London. After seeing Louise call another man "daddy", Phil decides that she is better off with Lisa. Two years later, Louise arrives alone in Walford, saying that Lisa has gone on holiday but not returned. Louise is taken into care, but when Phil discovers this, he has a DNA test to prove Louise is his daughter, and gains custody of her. Later that year, Phil is visited by a social worker, Derek Evans (Simon Lowe), who says that Lisa has made an application to see Louise. Phil does not want Lisa to have contact with Louise, but Phil's mother Peggy Mitchell (Barbara Windsor) takes her to see Lisa on Louise's request. Peggy slaps Lisa for abandoning her daughter, and Lisa reveals she had a breakdown and thought Louise might be better off without her, but the neighbour she left Louise with promised to look after her. Lisa worries that Phil might hurt Louise physically after Phil has hit Peggy, who is unable to assure Lisa that this will not happen.

Peggy allows Louise to stay with Lisa permanently, as long as Phil can visit her. Phil steals the social worker's bag to get Lisa's address, and drives there to confront her, but finds the house abandoned and empty.

=== 2017 ===
Seven years later, Louise (now Tilly Keeper) is burnt by bullies Madison Drake (Seraphina Beh) and Alexandra D'Costa (Sydney Craven), and Lisa visits her in hospital. Lisa and Sharon argue, but Sharon allows Lisa to stay. She tells Sharon that Louise wanted to live with Phil when she got a new boyfriend, which she admits was a relief. Lisa tells Phil she has had help with her life and has changed, but he ejects her from the hospital, telling her to stay away from Louise. She then stands up to Phil, and he allows her to visit Louise. Lisa then starts talking strangely. She sees her therapist, and lies that she has been doing fun things with Louise.

Lisa takes the keys to Phil's house and lets herself in, talking to and smashing photos, but cuts herself on glass. A doctor allows Lisa to take Louise outside of the hospital, but Lisa tells Louise she has been discharged, and takes her to a train station. Phil and Sharon inform the police that Louise is missing, and they trace Lisa through a cash withdrawal. Phil then discovers that Lisa has a mental health team. Lisa takes Louise to a hotel, and prevents her from using the phone by cutting the cord, despite her being in agony. Louise realises that Lisa is not taking her medication. When Lisa allows Louise to go, she chooses to stay, and comforts Lisa when she is distressed.

Phil tracks them down, but Lisa hits him over the head with a phone, while Louise passes out. Sharon realises that Lisa's problems are all Phil's fault, and Lisa tells Louise they will go to the hospital together. Later, Louise blames herself for Lisa's condition, telling Phil she left her despite knowing she was ill.

=== 2019–2020 ===
In August 2019, a heavily pregnant Louise and her fiancé Keanu Taylor (Danny Walters) flee Walford after Phil's son Ben frames Keanu for attacking Phil, when the real culprit was Stacey Slater (Lacey Turner). Ben convinces Mel to give him Lisa's address, and Mel lies to Ben about Lisa's whereabouts; although Mel eventually reveals her location, Lisa is not found.

Lisa returns in September 2019 to seek Mel's help to get Keanu out of the country. Lisa suggests that she, Louise, Mel, Keanu and Mel's son Hunter Owen (Charlie Winter) flee together, but Hunter escapes and holds The Queen Vic hostage. Hunter takes Louise, threatening to shoot her if the police do not give into his demands, but he is later shot and killed by a marksman.

Phil asks Louise and Keanu to move back in with him, which upsets Lisa, as she had planned for her and Louise to live together. A concerned Lisa, recognising the signs, tries to support Louise's best friend Bex Fowler (Jasmine Armfield), advising her that she does not have to go to Oxford University if she does not want to, but Bex ignores her, pretending she is fine; Bex later overdoses, but eventually recovers.

Lisa and Mel fall out over Sharon, and also over Mel's increasing obsession with Louise's pregnancy. However, when Mel is killed, Lisa is devastated and, genuinely believing Sharon killed Mel, she exposes to Phil the truth she learned from a vengeful Mel that Phil is not Sharon's baby's father. Lisa later begins a feud with Sharon, and on the day of Mel's funeral, she bans the Mitchells from attending, and reveals to the whole pub that Sharon's baby is not Phil's.

After the square thinks Lisa is mentally ill again, she checks herself into a unit for a break. However, Sharon reveals to Lisa that Keanu is the father as Louise gives birth. Upon hearing this, Lisa leaves the unit, with the intention of telling Phil. Once Lisa sees them as a family, she decides not to tell Phil and Louise, but makes sure that Keanu never hurts Louise, stating that if he does, she will reveal everything. The birth of their granddaughter, Peggy Taylor, brings Lisa and Phil together, and they make amends.

Phil, however, becomes suspicious, and starts to believe Lisa. Mistakenly thinking Phil arranged Keanu's "murder", Lisa, Louise, Peggy and Phil flee to Portugal. In August 2021, Phil receives a call from Louise saying that Lisa was involved in a car accident in France, after a male driver drove into the back of her. Phil goes to care for Louise and Peggy while Lisa recovers.

=== 2023 ===
In July 2023, Lisa returns to Walford with Peggy, having become her legal guardian due to Louise's "uncontrollable behaviour" as a result of Keanu's affair with Sharon. She refuses to let Keanu see Peggy unless he gives her large amounts of money for maintenance; these demands continue, and after various arguments with Phil and his fiancée Kat Slater (Jessie Wallace), it is then discovered that Lisa has been lying about Louise, and has been using the money to fund a gambling addiction. Keanu then breaks into Phil's safe and steals money from him to hand over to Lisa.

Phil discovers his money is missing and assumes it was Lisa. Kat calls the police; Lisa is arrested and held for questioning. Before Lisa is released, Keanu confesses to Phil that it was him who stole the money because Lisa was blackmailing him. Sharon discovers Lisa has a gambling problem, and tells Phil. Phil then refuses to hand over Peggy until Lisa gets her act together. A destitute Lisa is found sleeping on the square bench by Sharon, who invites her to stay with her for a couple of nights.

Sharon and Keanu have a row over these arrangements; Keanu then sees Lisa's bag, and hides her and Peggy's passports so that they will miss the flight back to Portugal the following day. Lisa searches Sharon's house, and furiously accuses Keanu of sabotage. With the help of Sharon and Martin Fowler (James Bye), Lisa finds the passports, and secretly orders a taxi to the airport. Keanu then realises Lisa is leaving with Peggy, and chases after the taxi, desperately watching on as Lisa departs with Peggy for Portugal.

== Reception ==
In 2002, a survey done by Whitaker's revealed that 11% of British people questioned could not name a single world leader, but nearly half could list five characters in EastEnders. Most named was Phil Mitchell (44%), followed by Mark Fowler (40%), Pauline Fowler (30%), Peggy Mitchell (28%) and Lisa Fowler (24%).

Daily Mirror television critic Ian Hyland has described Lisa as miserable, suggesting in 2002 that she was "red-hot favourite to take over [Pauline Fowler's] misery mantle." Jamie McCallum from The Guardian mocked the character and her relationship with Phil in 2000, stating, "We should, however, pay tribute to Lisa. This was the latest in a string of gripping dilemmas, including Should I Date Phil?, Should I Shag Phil? and Should I Give Birth to a Descendant of Phil? For one who spends so much time deliberating, that girl makes a lot of duff decisions."
