= Sir Richard la Touche Colthurst, 9th Baronet =

Sir Richard la Touche Colthurst
- Predecessor: Richard St John Jeffryes Colthurs
- Successor: Charles St John Colthurst
- Born: August 14, 1928
- Died: March 22, 2003 (aged 74)
- Spouse: Janet Georgina Wilson-Wright
- Issue: Sir Charles Colthurst, 10th Baronet; James Colthurst
- Father: Sir Richard St John Jefferyes Colthurst, 8th Baronet

Sir Richard la Touche Colthurst, 9th Baronet (14 August 1928 – 22 March 2003) succeeded as 9th Colthurst Baronetcy in February 1955 following the death of his father Sir Richard St John Jefferyes Colthurst, 8th Baronet.

== Family dispute ==
In 1999, a series of family disputes ended up in the courts. These included rights of way, issues concerning two shops at Blarney Castle and the ownership of the furniture in Blarney Castle where Sir Richard lived. Despite earlier reaching an agreement with his parents that they owned the furniture in July 1999, their son Sir Charles St John Colthurst, 10th Baronet requested that a Rescission of this agreement. He is the father of James Colthurst, a close friend to Diana, Princess of Wales.

On his death, he left an estate valued at £232,305 net.

Baronetage of Ireland
| Preceded by Richard St John Jeffryes Colthurst | Baronet (of Ardrum); 1955–2003 | Succeeded by Charles St John Colthurst |
