= Sir Nicholas Colthurst, 4th Baronet =

Anglo-Irish politician

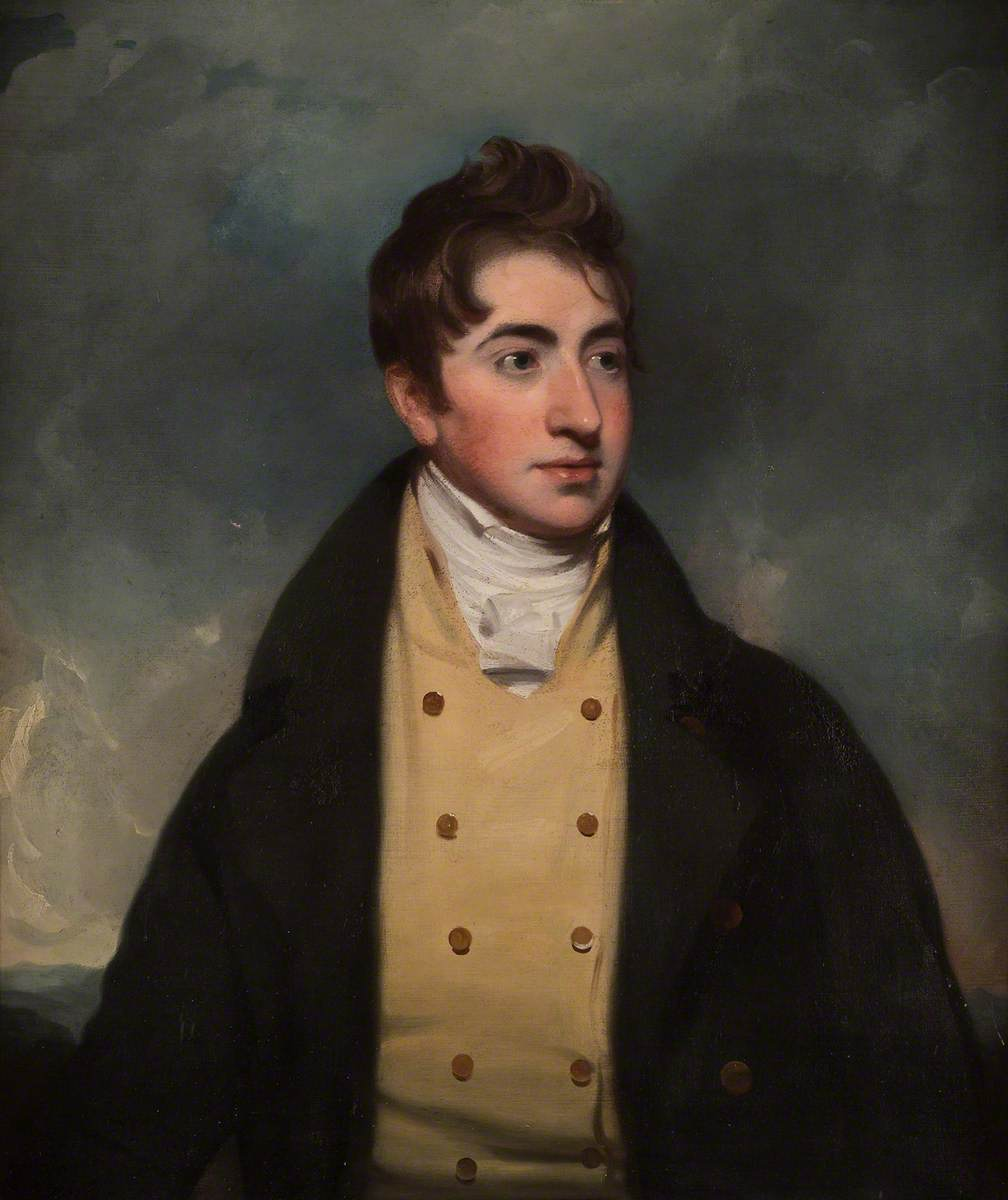
Image of Sir Nicholas Conway Colthurst

Sir Nicholas Colthurst, 4th Baronet (1789–1829) was an Anglo-Irish politician.

He served in the House of Commons of the United Kingdom as the member of parliament (MP) for Cork City 1812–1829.

He was the fourth of the Colthurst baronets in the Baronetage of Ireland, the only son of Sir Nicholas Colthurst, 3rd Baronet and Harriet LaTouche. In 1810, Sir Nicholas Colthurst got a grant from the British Government for £20,000 to begin the construction of Cork City Gaol. Although pledged to oppose Catholic emancipation, he felt it necessary at times to temporise on the issue., as the Roman Catholic influence was strong in Cork city.

He married his cousin Elizabeth Vesey and had four sons and one daughter, including David la Touche Colthurst who was member of parliament (MP) for County Cork from 1879 until his seat was abolished in 1885.

Baronetage of Ireland
| Preceded by Nicholas Colthurst | Baronet (of Ardum); 1795–1829 | Succeeded by George Colthurst |
