= Diana: Her True Story (film) =

1993 Sky One (UK) and NBC (US) TV film

- Genre: Biography; Drama
- Written by: Andrew Morton
- Directed by: Kevin Connor
- Starring: Serena Scott Thomas; David Threlfall
- Theme music composer: Ken Thorne
- Country of origin: United Kingdom
- Original language: English
- No. of series: 1
- No. of episodes: 2

Production
- Executive producer: Martin Poll
- Producers: Hugh Harlow; Shirley Mellner; Andrew Morton
- Cinematography: Douglas Milsome
- Editors: Barry Peters; Brian Smedley-Aston
- Running time: 180 minutes
- Production company: Martin Poll Productions

Original release
- Network: Sky One
- Release: 14 February – 16 February 1993

Diana: Her True Story is a 1993 biographical drama television film based on the life of Diana, Princess of Wales. It is based on the book of the same name by Andrew Morton, who also served as screenwriter and producer of the adaptation.

== Cast ==
=== Starring ===
- Serena Scott Thomas as Diana, Princess of Wales
- David Threlfall as Prince Charles

=== Also starring ===
- Elizabeth Garvie as Camilla Parker Bowles
- Donald Douglas as Prince Philip, Duke of Edinburgh
- Jemma Redgrave as Carolyn Bartholomew
- Jeremy Child as Alfred Drake-Kinney
- William Franklyn as Lord Mountbatten
- Jean Anderson as Lady Fermoy
- Anne Stallybrass as Queen Elizabeth II

=== Co-starring ===
- Belle Connor as Diana Spencer (age 6)
- Tracy Hardwick as Sarah Ferguson
- Aletta Lawson as Princess Anne
- Cornelia Hayes O'Herlihy as Jane Spencer
- Helen Masters as Sarah Spencer
- Gabrielle Blunt as the Queen Mother
- Christopher Bowen as James Gilbey
- Robert Reynolds as Sergeant Mannakee
- Rowland Davies as Earl Spencer
- Adam Blackwood as Christopher
- Alan Shearman as Reporter 1
- David Ryall as Reporter 2

=== Featuring ===
- Jeffrey Harmer as Prince Andrew
- Robin Hart
- Anthony Calf
- Georgia Reece
- Harvey Ashby
- Nicholas Bastian
- Barclay Wright
- John Vine
- Tessa Shaw as Countess Spencer

== Competition ==
The American ABC network was quicker off the mark, and soon after Morton's book Diana: Her True Story was published in May 1992, the television movie Charles and Diana: Unhappily Ever After went into production, and aired for the first time in December 1992.
