= The Queen: Her Life =

2022 book by Andrew Morton

- Authors: Andrew Morton
- Language: English
- Subject: Elizabeth II
- Genre: Biography
- Publisher: Grand Central Publishing
- Publication date: 15 November 2022
- Publication place: United States
- Media type: Print
- Pages: 448
- ISBN: 978-1-53870-043-3

The Queen: Her Life is a biographical book about Elizabeth II, written by Andrew Morton and published by Grand Central Publishing in 2022.

== Critical reception ==
The book was criticised by reviewers for giving a simplified and uniformly positive portrayal of the queen. Hillary Kelly, in her review for Vulture.com wrote that the author "twists himself in knots to excuse all but the most paltry defects of her character, a tactic that destroys any chance of his turning the flat image of the waving old lady into a person endowed with innate individuality", and Alexandra Jacobs, reviewing the book for The New York Times, reflected on the lack of in-depth analysis while also commenting favourably on Morton's droll style and his way of incorporating minor amusing details from the lives of the royals.

Several reviewers commented on the fact that the book, which had had a planned publicity date in the spring of 2023, was released several months earlier than planned. Jacobs called it "rushed and undernourished" and discussed a number of editorial slips, while Kelly referred to Morton as a "drive-by life hijacker".

The book's heavy reliance on previously published information was discussed by Arianne Chernock in The Washington Post as well as by Anne de Courcy in The Daily Telegraph. The book was also reviewed in The Rockdale Citizen.
