= Sir John Colthurst, 1st Baronet =

Anglo-Irish politician

Sir John Conway Colthurst, 1st Baronet (died 19 September 1775) was an Anglo-Irish politician.

Colthurst was the son of John Colthurst and Alice Conway. On 3 August 1744, he was created a baronet, of Ardum in the Baronetage of Ireland. He served in the Irish House of Commons as the Member of Parliament for Doneraile between 1751 and 1760, Youghal between 1761 and 1768 and Castlemartyr from 1769 to 1775.

He married Lady Charlotte FitzMaurice, the daughter of Thomas FitzMaurice, 1st Earl of Kerry and Anne Petty, in 1741.

Baronetage of Ireland
New creation	Baronet (of Ardrum); 1744–1775	Succeeded by John Colthurst
