= Andrew Morton (writer) =

English journalist (born 1953)

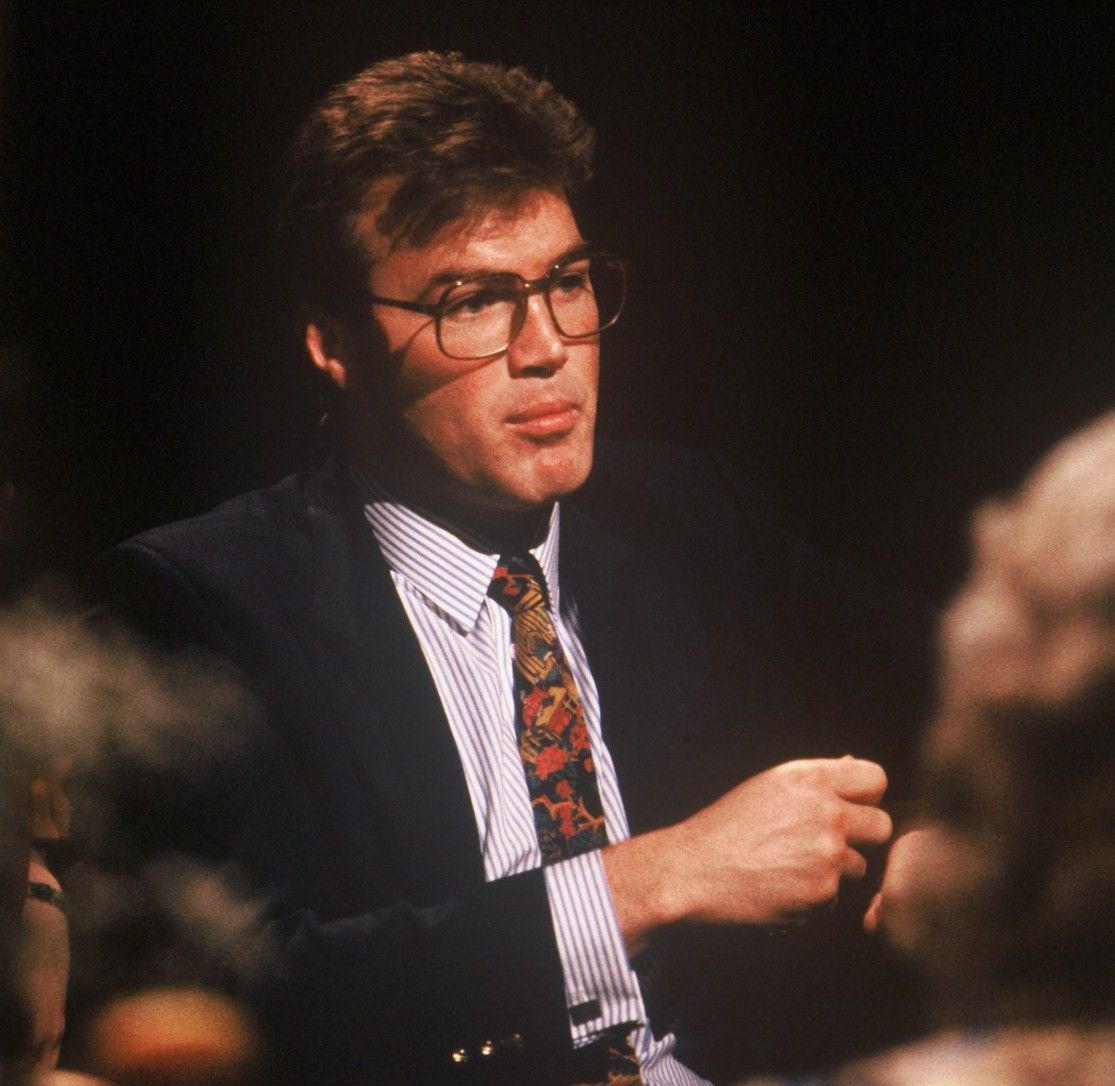
- Morton appearing on television programme After Dark in 1989
- Born: Andrew David Morton; 1953 (age 72–73); Dewsbury, West Riding of Yorkshire, England
- Education: Temple Moor Grammar School; University of Sussex
- Occupations: Journalist and writer

Andrew David Morton (born 1953) is an English journalist and writer who has published biographies of royal figures such as Diana, Princess of Wales, and celebrity subjects including Tom Cruise, Madonna, Angelina Jolie and Monica Lewinsky; several of his books have been unauthorised and contain contested assertions.

== Early life and career ==
Andrew David Morton was born and raised in Halton, Leeds, West Riding of Yorkshire, His father ran a picture framing business. He attended Temple Moor Boys' Grammar School, Leeds and Sussex University where he studied history. After university, Morton became a tabloid journalist and worked for three London tabloids, the Daily Star, News of the World, and Daily Mail, until 1987.

=== Biographies of royal figures ===
Andrew Morton wrote a biography of Diana, Princess of Wales called Diana: Her True Story. Unable to interview Diana in person, he passed along interview questions through her friend James Colthurst. In 1993 it was made into a television film of the same name, with Serena Scott Thomas as Diana. Following Diana's death in August 1997, Morton issued an edition entitled Diana: Her True Story in Her Own Words in October and acknowledged Diana's role as the book's main source of information. The revelation, which came after years of denial of getting any input from Diana for the book, together with the release of her recorded conversations on tapes caused a mixed reaction in the press, with some accusing Morton of breaching confidentiality and exploiting the tragedy of her untimely death and others praising his candour.

On 16 November 2010, Prince William announced his engagement to Catherine Middleton. Morton was commissioned by Michael O'Mara Books to write a book to coincide with the royal wedding on 29 April 2011. The book, which went on sale on 3 May 2011 in the UK, includes a detailed biography of Prince William, as well as details of his relationship with Catherine Middleton. The book features full-colour photos of Prince William and the couple, as well as a detailed section on the wedding itself.

In April 2018, he published Meghan: A Hollywood Princess about Meghan Markle, who married Prince Harry a month later in May 2018.

His biography of Elizabeth II, called The Queen: Her Life, was published in November 2022, two months after her death. Reviewers commented on the lack of depth, the frequent drawing on information from Morton's previous royal biographies, and the way the book had apparently been rushed through the process of publication.

=== Tom Cruise: An Unauthorized Biography ===
Tom Cruise: An Unauthorized Biography was published in January 2008, and reprinted with an update in February 2009. In a review in The New York Times, Janet Maslin writes "Mr. Morton has found a number of former Scientologists who are willing to speak freely, and in some cases vengefully, about the group's purported inner workings. Mr. Morton's eagerness to include their voices leads him to push the limits of responsible reporting." Maslin adds that Morton "provides a credible portrait extrapolated from the actor's on-the-record remarks and highly visible public behaviour."

Writing in Entertainment Weekly, Mark Harris gives the book a grade of "C−", and says "Cruise emerges from Morton's takedown moderately scratched but as uncracked as ever." Another review in The New York Times by Ada Calhoun stated:

However shady Scientology may be, Morton's language in Tom Cruise: An Unauthorized Biography is extreme. He and his sources compare the church and its leadership to fascists, the Roman Empire, storm troopers, Machiavelli, Orwell's Animal Farm, Napoleon, Stalinists and North Korea. He also repeatedly invokes Nazism, and quotes without censure the German Protestant Church's comparison of Cruise to Joseph Goebbels.

Teresa Budasi of the Chicago Sun-Times describes the book as "fascinating", although Budasi also raises a "question as to what's true and what isn't." Budasi sums up her impression of the work, writing "Morton's book is as much an indictment on Cruise's chosen faith as it is the life story of one of the world's biggest movie stars. And by the end you realize that 'Scientologist' is what will end up being the role of his lifetime." In a review in The Buffalo News, Jeff Simon writes of the author: "To give Morton the credit he's clearly due: he is one of the best around at constructing a 250-page gossip column."

Upon its publication, Cruise's lawyer and the Church of Scientology released statements questioning the truthfulness of assertions made by Morton in the book. In a 15-page statement released to the press, the Church of Scientology calls the book "a bigoted, defamatory assault replete with lies". The book was not published in the UK, Australia, or New Zealand due to strict libel laws in those countries.

=== Other publications ===
Morton received public attention after Diana's death, when he revealed the extent of her collaborations with him. He achieved greater prominence in the United States after the publication of Monica's Story. After Monica's Story, Morton investigated a mining disaster, which led to his first non-royal journalistic account, Nine for Nine: The Pennsylvania Mine Rescue Miracle. He also wrote an authorised biography of Kenyan president Daniel arap Moi. The book resulted in a libel case brought against Morton by a Kenyan judge – Morton lost the case and was ordered to pay £45,700 in damages. Morton then moved on to the "king and queen of pop culture", as he termed them, David Beckham and his wife Victoria. Posh and Becks became a No. 1 best-seller in the UK.

Soon after, Morton announced that he would be taking on the "queen of pop", Madonna. Despite a seven-figure advance by St. Martin's Press and a 500,000-copy first printing, Madonna failed to make waves in North America, where it spent only two weeks on The New York Times best-seller list (peaking at No. 8). By contrast, J. Randy Taraborrelli's Madonna: An Intimate Biography, released at the same time, became a massive best-seller in the United Kingdom (although it only made The New York Times extended best-seller list). Morton subsequently wrote another Diana book titled In Pursuit of Love, with information that he had left unaddressed, which made The New York Times best-seller list.

Morton also wrote an unauthorised biography of Angelina Jolie. Janet Maslin highlighted the lack of sources noted in the book in a review in The New York Times, saying "the people most eager to tell him about Ms. Jolie are people who don't know her, so that the book is shrink-wrapped in glib insights from dubious psychiatric talents". Allen Barra described it as "the worst book in the 21st century so far" in a Salon review which summarised the book as "ill-informed, moralistic and just plain mean".

== Works ==
- Andrew, the Playboy Prince. Severn House. 1983. ISBN 0727809881.
- Inside Kensington Palace. O'Mara. 1987. ISBN 0948397969.
- Duchess: An Intimate Portrait of Sarah, Duchess of York. Contemporary Books. 1989 [1988]. ISBN 0809244381.
- Diana's Diary: An Intimate Portrait of the Princess of Wales. Summit Books. 1990. ISBN 0671728830.
- Inside Buckingham Palace. Summit Books. 1991. ISBN 0671749617.
- Diana: Her New Life. New York: Pocket. 1995 [1994]. ISBN 0671533983.
- Diana: Her True Story in Her Own Words. New York: Pocket. 1998 [1992]. ISBN 0-671-02412-4.
- Monica's Story. New York: St. Martin's Press. 1999. ISBN 0-312-97362-4.
- Posh & Becks. Simon Spotlight Entertainment. 2000. ISBN 1-4169-5386-8.
- Madonna. New York: St. Martin's Press. 2001. ISBN 0-312-28786-0.
- Tom Cruise: An Unauthorized Biography. New York: St. Martin's Press. 2008. ISBN 978-0-312-35986-7.
- Angelina: An Unauthorized Biography. New York: St. Martin's Press. 2010. ISBN 978-0-312-35986-7.
- William & Catherine: Their Story. New York: St. Martin's Press. 2011. ISBN 978-0-312-64340-9.
- Diana: In Pursuit of Love. Michael OMara. 2013 [2004]. ISBN 978-1782431053.
- 17 Carnations: The Windsors, the Nazis and the Cover-Up. London: Michael O'Mara Books. 2015. ISBN 9781782434566.
- Wallis in Love: The Untold Life of the Duchess of Windsor, the Woman Who Changed the Monarchy. New York: Grand Central Publishing. 2018. ISBN 978-1-455-56697-6.
- Meghan: A Hollywood Princess. New York: Grand Central Publishing. 2018. ISBN 978-1-538-74735-3.
- Elizabeth & Margaret: The Intimate World of the Windsor Sisters. New York: Grand Central Publishing. 2021. ISBN 978-1538700464.
- The Queen: Her Life. New York: Grand Central Publishing. 2022. ISBN 978-1-538-70043-3.
- Winston and the Windsors: How Churchill Shaped a Royal Dynasty. London: Michael O'Mara Books. 2025. ISBN 978-1-789-29704-1.
