= Diana: Her True Story (book) =

1992 authorised biography of Diana, Princess of Wales by Andrew Morton

- First edition
- Author: Andrew Morton
- Language: English
- Genre: Biography
- Publisher: Michael O'Mara Books
- Publication date: 16 June 1992
- Media type: Print
- Pages: 224
- ISBN: 9781854791917

Diana: Her True Story (later published as Diana: Her True Story – In Her Own Words) is an authorised biography of Diana, Princess of Wales, written by Andrew Morton. The book was published in the United Kingdom in hardcover format on 16 June 1992 by Michael O'Mara Books. The book was controversial as it detailed out Diana's suicidal unhappiness within her marriage and her struggles with depression. At the time of publication, Buckingham Palace denied any cooperation between the princess and Morton, but it was later revealed that Diana was the main source behind the book's content.

== Background and writing ==
In October 1986, while escorting the Princess of Wales on an official royal visit to St Thomas' Hospital where she opened a new CT scanner in James Colthurst's X-ray department, Colthurst met royal journalist Andrew Morton. Colthurst acted as a "middle-man" between Diana and Morton, who wrote the biography on the princess. In 1991, Colthurst conducted secret interviews with the Princess of Wales in which she talked about her marital issues and difficulties. He brought her questions from Morton and recorded tapes of her answers to bring back to him. Colthurst said of the experience, "She [Diana] was enormously enthusiastic to have her story out there, she knew exactly what she was doing. I'd cycle in, the recorder was in the briefcase, nothing surprising there. I'd go in and we'd normally have a few questions before lunch, we'd have lunch then we'd come out after lunch, I'd clip the microphone on and she'd finish them off." In 1992, shortly before Diana: Her True Story was published, the princess wrote to Colthurst, saying: "Obviously we are preparing for the volcano to erupt and I do feel better equipped to cope with whatever comes our way! Thank you for your belief in me and for taking the trouble to understand this mind—it's such a relief not to be on my own any more and that it's okay to be me." In 1993 the book was made into a television film of the same name, with Serena Scott Thomas as Diana.

During her lifetime, both Diana and Morton denied her direct involvement in the writing process and maintained that family and friends were the book's main source; however, after her death Morton acknowledged Diana's role in writing the tell-all in the book's updated edition, Diana: Her True Story in Her Own Words. The revelation, which came after years of denial of getting any input from Diana for the book, together with the release of her recorded conversations on tapes caused a mixed reaction in the press, with some accusing Morton of breaching confidentiality and exploiting the tragedy of her untimely death and others praising his candour.
