= Colthurst baronets =

Baronetcy in the Baronetage of Ireland

The Colthurst Baronetcy, of Ardrum in the County of Cork, is a title in the Baronetage of Ireland. It was created on 3 August 1744 for John Colthurst, who later represented Doneraile, Youghal, and Castle Martyr in the Irish House of Commons. The second Baronet was an aspiring politician who was killed in a duel. The third Baronet was a member of the Irish Parliament for Longford and Castle Martyr. The fourth Baronet represented Cork City in the British House of Commons from 1812 to 1829 and his fourth son David la Touche Colthurst County Cork from 1879 until his seat was abolished in 1885. The fifth Baronet sat as Liberal Member of Parliament for Kinsale between 1863 and 1874. He came into the Blarney Castle estate on the death of his father-in-law. The sixth Baronet served as High Sheriff of County Cork. The seventh Baronet was an Army officer in the First World War and a leading figure in Irish cricket. The eighth Baronet was the High Sheriff of County Dublin. The ninth Baronet lived in London and did not use the title. Since 2003, the title has been held by his son, the tenth Baronet, Charles St John Colthurst, who manages the Blarney estate full-time.

The family seat is Blarney Castle, near Blarney.

== Colthurst baronets, of Ardrum (1744) ==
Escutcheon of the Colthurst baronets of Ardrum

- Sir John Colthurst, 1st Baronet (died 1775)
- Sir John Conway Colthurst, 2nd Baronet (c. 1743–1787)
- Sir Nicholas Colthurst, 3rd Baronet (died 1795)
- Sir Nicholas Colthurst, 4th Baronet (1789–1829)
- Sir George Conway Colthurst, 5th Baronet (1824–1878)
- Sir George St John Colthurst, 6th Baronet (1850–1925)
- Sir George Oliver Colthurst, 7th Baronet (1882–1951)
- Sir Richard St John Jefferyes Colthurst, 8th Baronet (1887–1955)
- Sir Richard la Touche Colthurst, 9th Baronet (1928–2003)
- Sir Charles St John Colthurst, 10th Baronet (born 1955)

The heir apparent is the present holder's only son John Conway la Touche Colthurst (born 1988).
