= 30th Screen Actors Guild Awards =

- Official poster
- Description: Outstanding motion picture and primetime television performances
- Date: February 24, 2024
- Location: Shrine Auditorium and Expo Hall, Los Angeles, California
- Country: United States
- Presented by: SAG-AFTRA
- Preshow hosts: Tan France; Elaine Welteroth

Highlights
- Most awards: Film; Oppenheimer (3); Television; The Bear (3)
- Most nominations: Film; Barbie (4); Oppenheimer (4); Television; Succession (5)
- Website: www.sagawards.org

Television/radio coverage
- Network: Netflix
- Runtime: 2 hours, 14 minutes
- Produced by: Silent House Productions
- Directed by: Alex Rudzinski

The 30th Annual Screen Actors Guild Awards, honoring the best achievements in film and television performances for the year 2023, was presented on February 24, 2024, at the Shrine Auditorium and Expo Hall in Los Angeles, California. For the first time, the ceremony streamed live on Netflix, starting at 8:00p.m. EST / 5:00p.m. PST.

Tan France and Elaine Welteroth presented the show's red-carpet and backstage interviews. The telecast was produced for the first time by Silent House Productions, with Alex Rudzinski serving as director.

Before the nominations announcement, Entertainment Weekly and the Screen Actors Guild co-hosted the inaugural SAG Awards Season Celebration, presented by City National Bank, on December 14, 2023, in Los Angeles. The nominees were announced on January 10, 2024, by Kumail Nanjiani and Issa Rae via the SAG Awards' and Netflix's Instagram Live.

Barbra Streisand was announced as the 2023 SAG Life Achievement Award recipient on December 14, 2023.

== Ceremony information ==
This year's ceremony marked its live debut on Netflix. In January 2023, Netflix struck an 11th hour deal to televise the show, after its previous deal with TBS/TNT expired in May 2022, but the previous year's ceremony was broadcast on Netflix's YouTube channel because Netflix was still experimenting with live broadcasts at that time.

== Winners and nominees ==
- Note: Winners are listed first and highlighted in **boldface**.

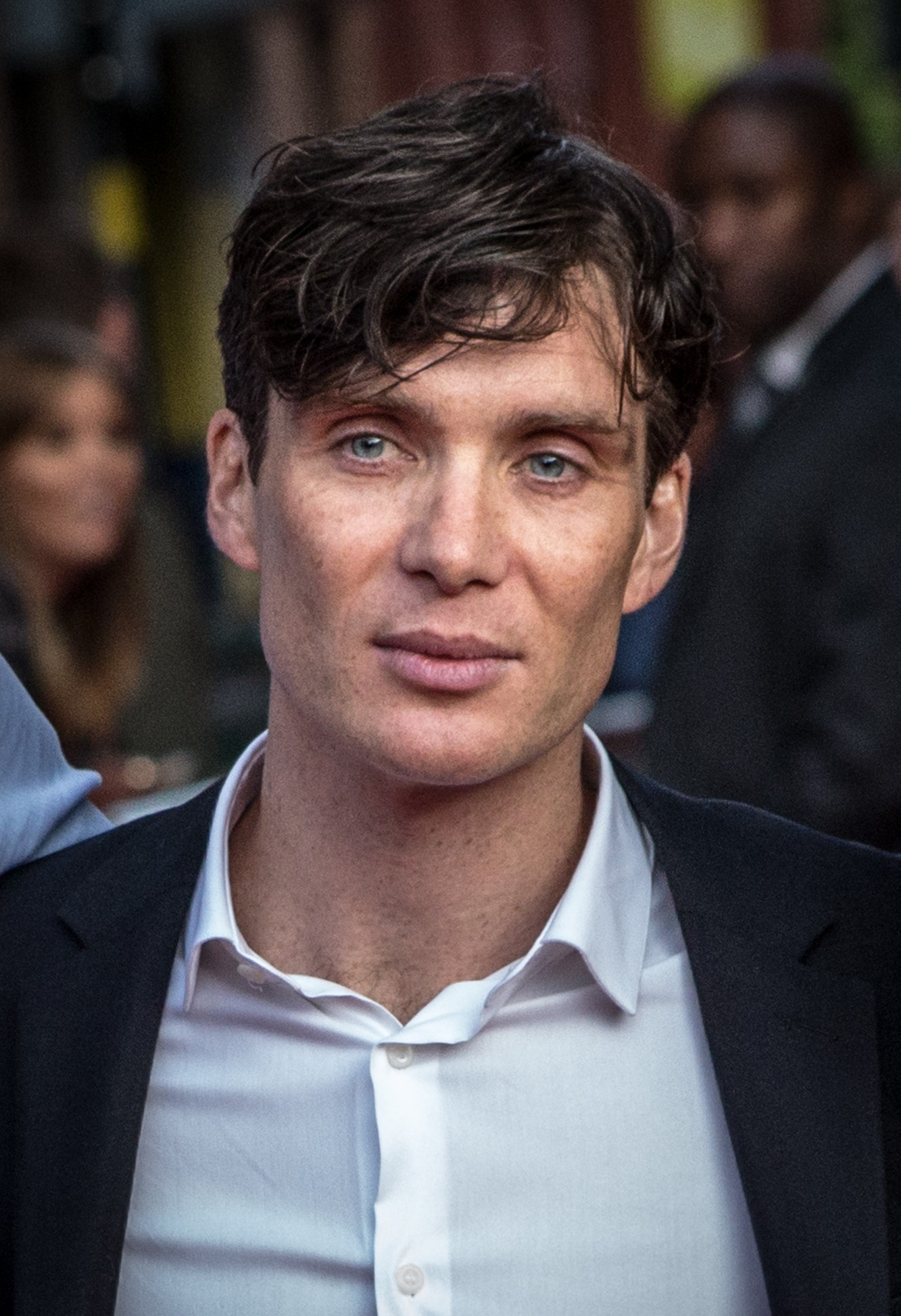
Cillian Murphy, Outstanding Performance by a Male Actor in a Leading Role winner

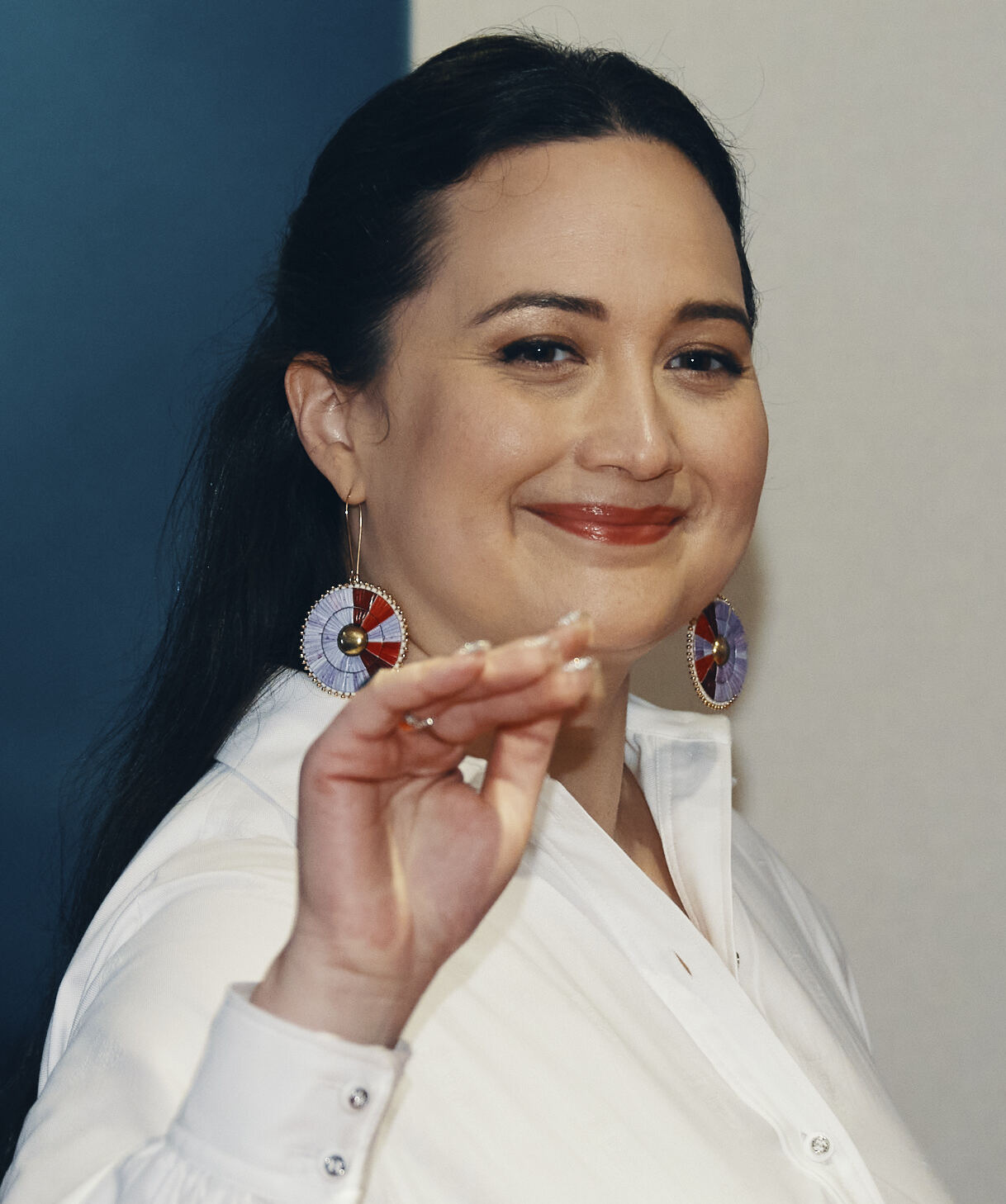
Lily Gladstone, Outstanding Performance by a Female Actor in a Leading Role winner

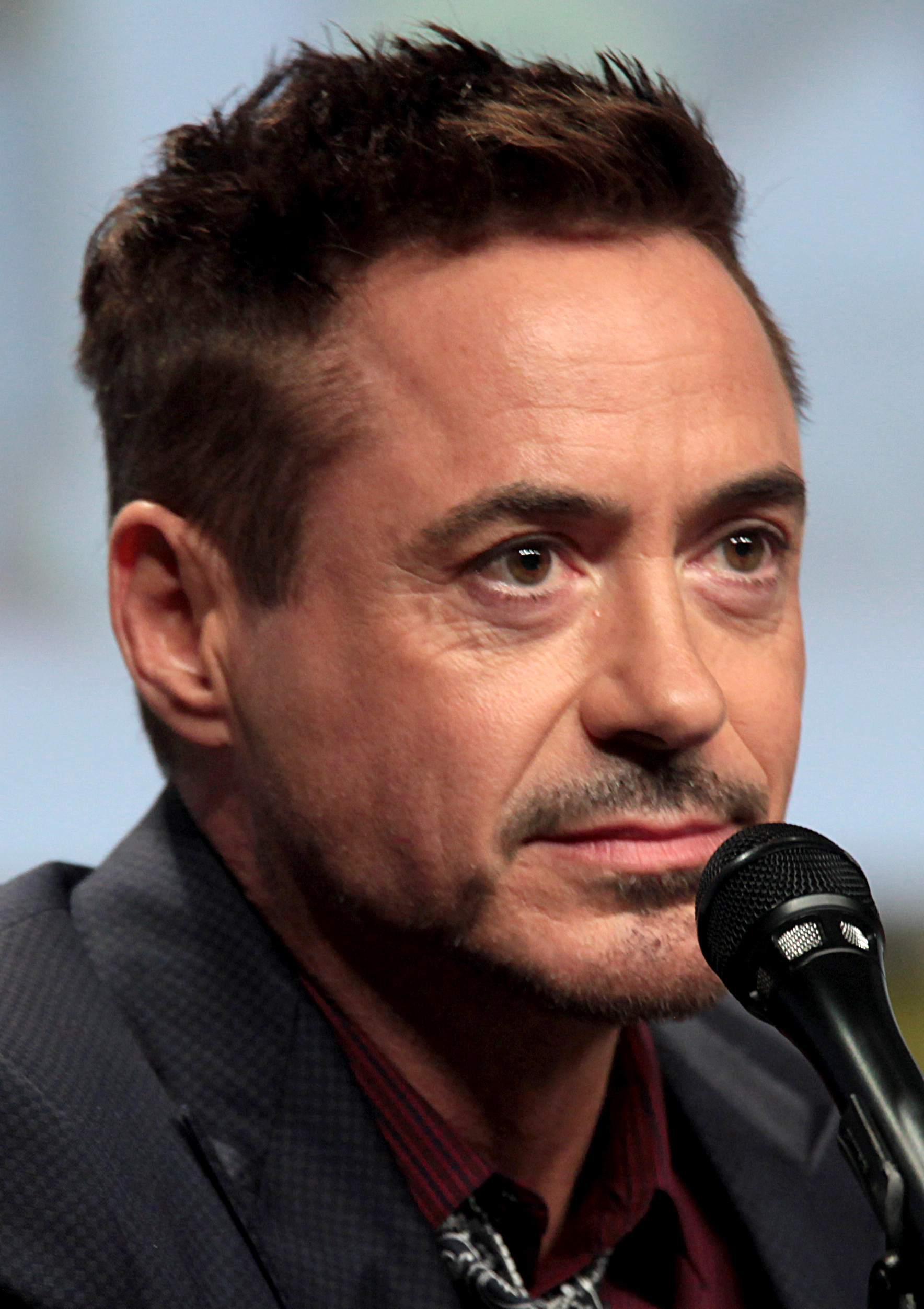
Robert Downey Jr., Outstanding Performance by a Male Actor in a Supporting Role winner

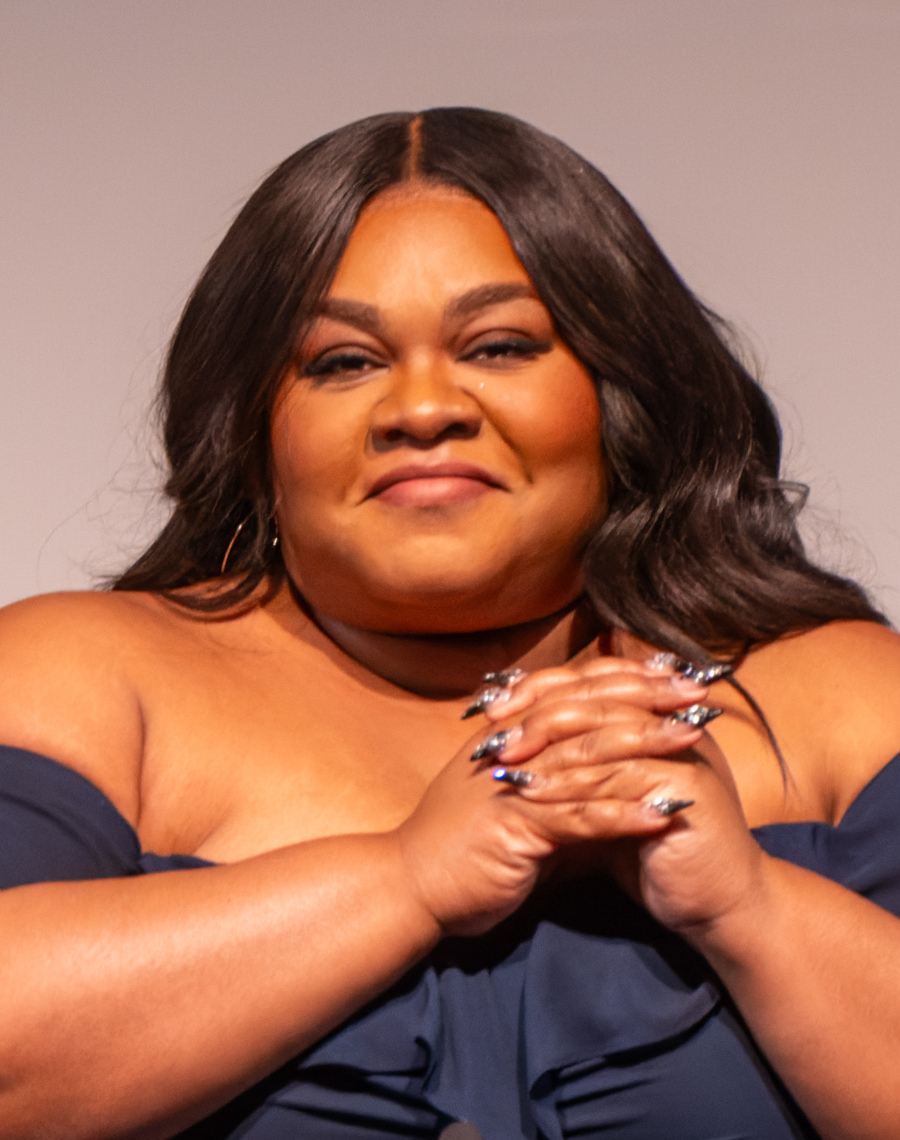
Da'Vine Joy Randolph, Outstanding Performance by a Female Actor in a Supporting Role winner

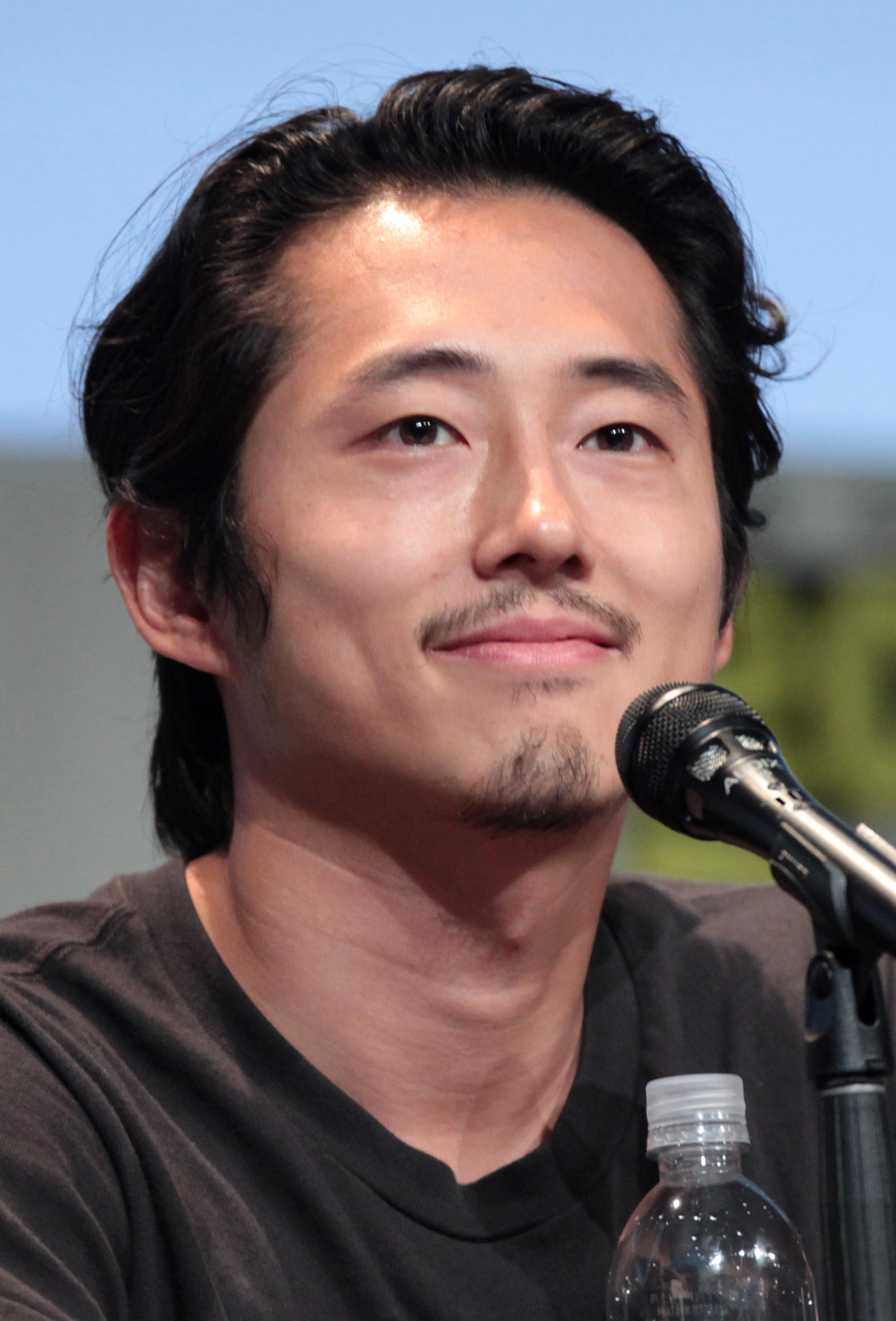
Steven Yeun, Outstanding Performance by a Male Actor in a Television Movie or Limited Series winner

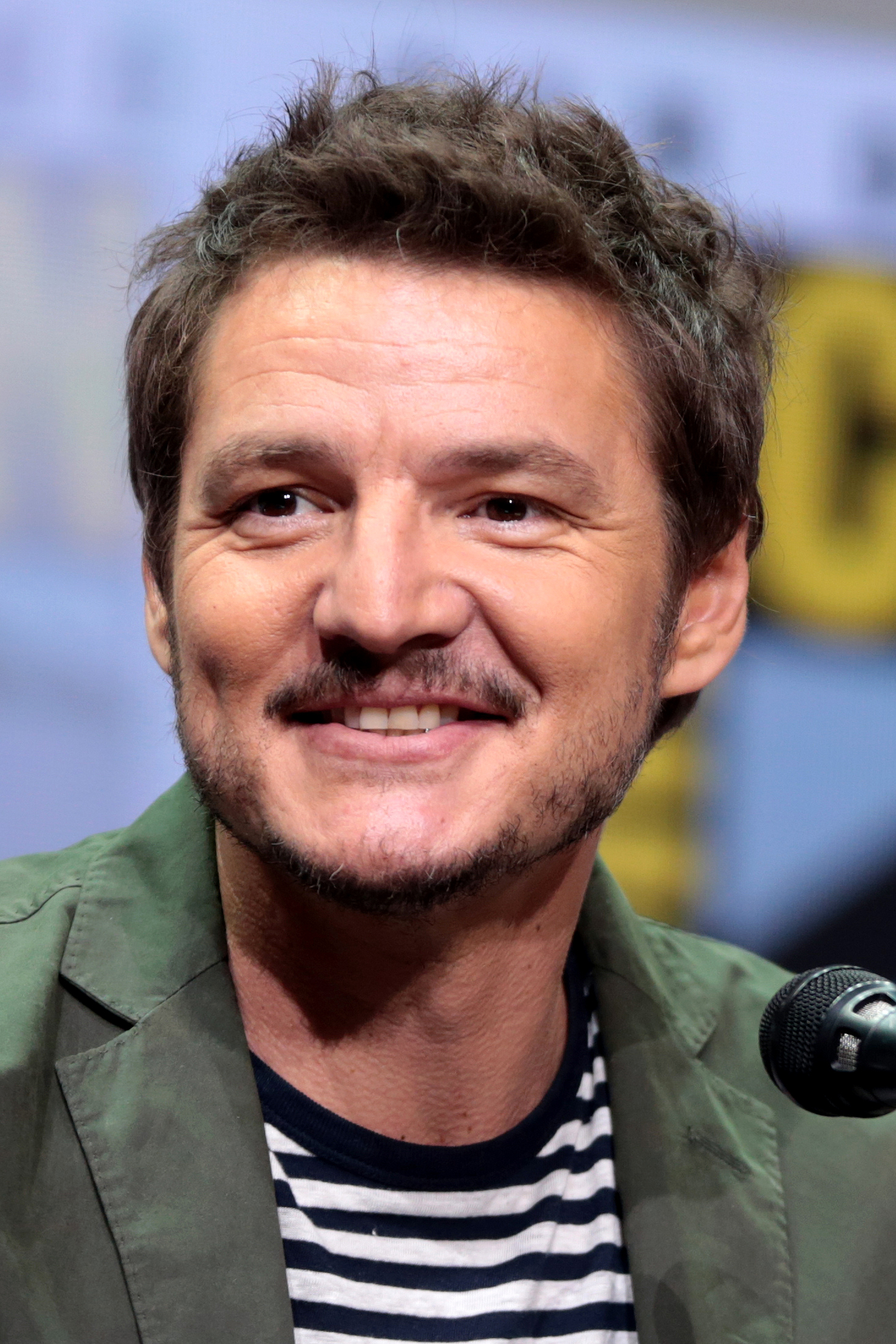
Pedro Pascal, Outstanding Performance by a Male Actor in a Drama Series winner

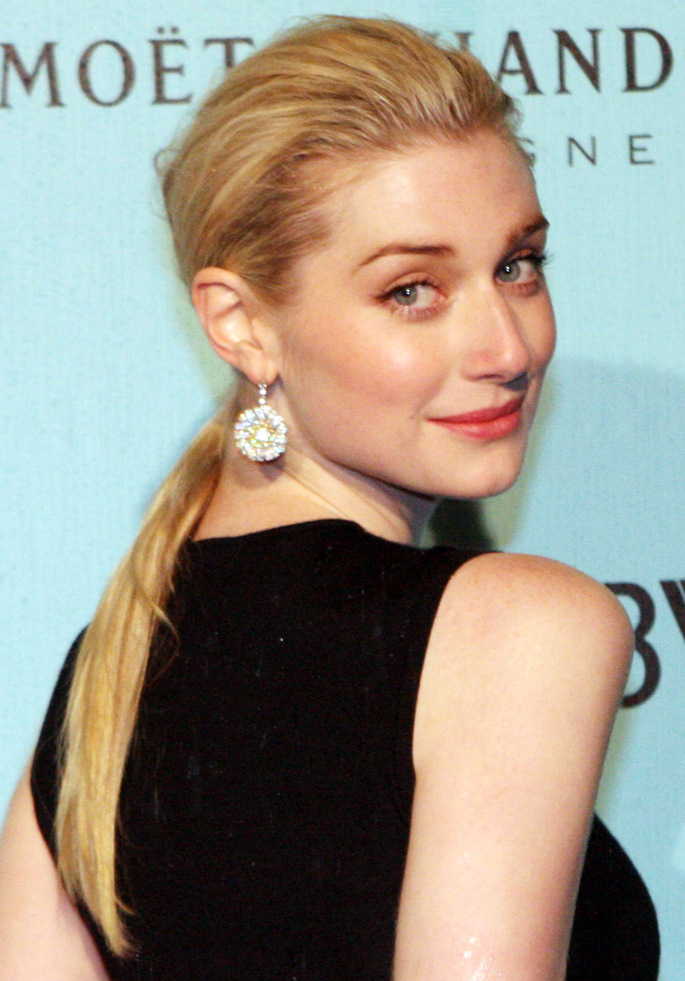
Elizabeth Debicki, Outstanding Performance by a Female Actor in a Drama Series winner

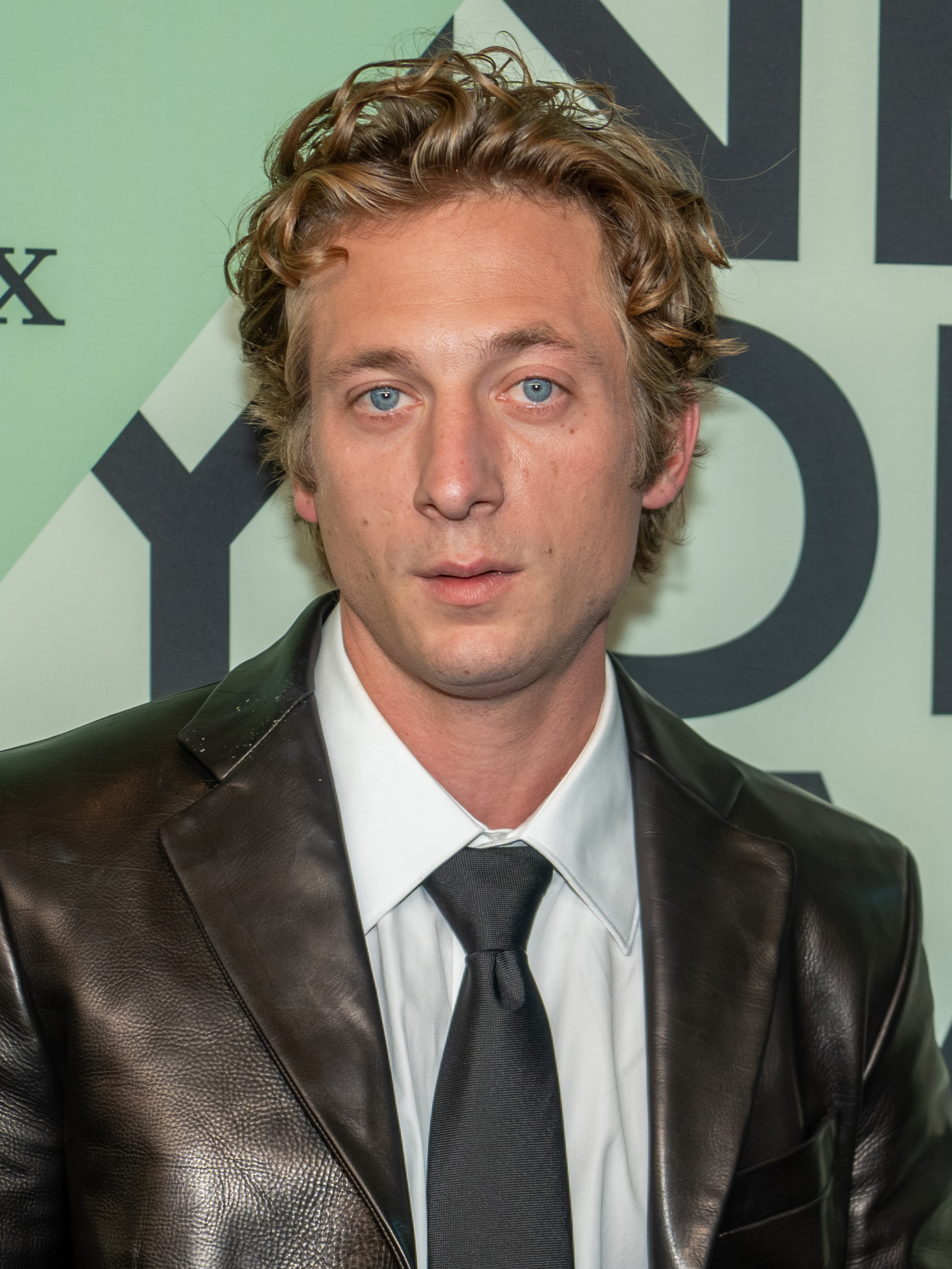
Jeremy Allen White, Outstanding Performance by a Male Actor in a Comedy Series winner

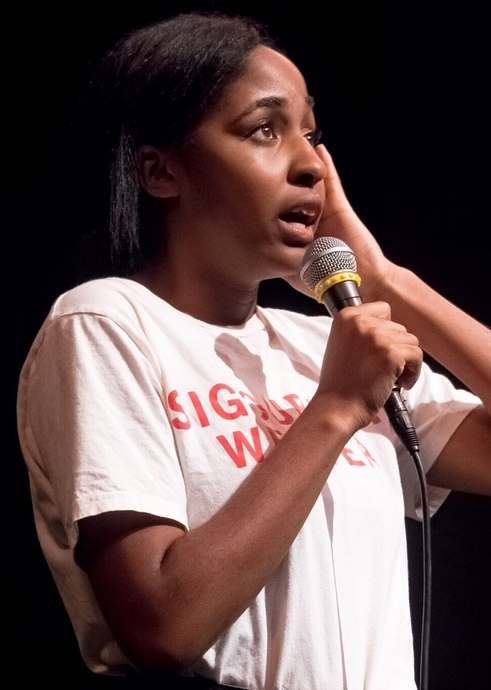
Ayo Edebiri, Outstanding Performance by a Female Actor in a Comedy Series winner

=== Film ===
**Outstanding Performance by a Male Actor in a Leading Role**: **Cillian Murphy – Oppenheimer as J. Robert Oppenheimer**; Bradley Cooper – Maestro as Leonard Bernstein; Colman Domingo – Rustin as Bayard Rustin; Paul Giamatti – The Holdovers as Paul Hunham; Jeffrey Wright – American Fiction as Thelonious "Monk" Ellison	**Outstanding Performance by a Female Actor in a Leading Role**: **Lily Gladstone – Killers of the Flower Moon as Mollie Burkhart**; Annette Bening – Nyad as Diana Nyad; Carey Mulligan – Maestro as Felicia Montealegre; Margot Robbie – Barbie as Barbie; Emma Stone – Poor Things as Bella Baxter
**Outstanding Performance by a Male Actor in a Supporting Role**: **Robert Downey Jr. – Oppenheimer as Lewis Strauss**; Sterling K. Brown – American Fiction as Clifford Ellison; Willem Dafoe – Poor Things as Dr. Godwin Baxter; Robert De Niro – Killers of the Flower Moon as William Hale; Ryan Gosling – Barbie as Ken	**Outstanding Performance by a Female Actor in a Supporting Role**: **Da'Vine Joy Randolph – The Holdovers as Mary Lamb**; Emily Blunt – Oppenheimer as Kitty Oppenheimer; Danielle Brooks – The Color Purple as Sofia; Penélope Cruz – Ferrari as Laura Ferrari; Jodie Foster – Nyad as Bonnie Stoll
**Outstanding Performance by a Cast in a Motion Picture**: **Oppenheimer – Casey Affleck, Emily Blunt, Kenneth Branagh, Matt Damon, Robert Downey Jr., Josh Hartnett, Rami Malek, Cillian Murphy, and Florence Pugh**; American Fiction – Erika Alexander, Adam Brody, Sterling K. Brown, Keith David, John Ortiz, Issa Rae, Tracee Ellis Ross, Leslie Uggams, and Jeffrey Wright; Barbie – Michael Cera, Will Ferrell, America Ferrera, Ryan Gosling, Ariana Greenblatt, Kate McKinnon, Helen Mirren, Rhea Perlman, Issa Rae, and Margot Robbie; The Color Purple – Halle Bailey, Fantasia Barrino, Jon Batiste, Danielle Brooks, Ciara, Colman Domingo, Aunjanue Ellis-Taylor, Louis Gossett Jr., Corey Hawkins, Taraji P. Henson, Phylicia Pearl Mpasi, and Gabriella Wilson "H.E.R."; Killers of the Flower Moon – Tantoo Cardinal, Robert De Niro, Leonardo DiCaprio, Brendan Fraser, Lily Gladstone, John Lithgow, and Jesse Plemons
**Outstanding Performance by a Stunt Ensemble in a Motion Picture**: **Mission: Impossible – Dead Reckoning Part One**; Barbie; Guardians of the Galaxy Vol. 3; Indiana Jones and the Dial of Destiny; John Wick: Chapter 4

=== Television ===
**Outstanding Performance by a Male Actor in a Television Movie or Limited Series**: **Steven Yeun – Beef (Netflix) as Danny Cho**; Matt Bomer – Fellow Travelers (Showtime) as Hawkins "Hawk" Fuller; Jon Hamm – Fargo (FX) as Roy Tillman; David Oyelowo – Lawmen: Bass Reeves (Paramount+) as Bass Reeves; Tony Shalhoub – Mr. Monk's Last Case: A Monk Movie (Peacock) as Adrian Monk	**Outstanding Performance by a Female Actor in a Television Movie or Limited Series**: **Ali Wong – Beef (Netflix) as Amy Lau**; Uzo Aduba – Painkiller (Netflix) as Edie Flowers; Kathryn Hahn – Tiny Beautiful Things (Hulu) as Clare Pierce; Brie Larson – Lessons in Chemistry (Apple TV+) as Elizabeth Zott; Bel Powley – A Small Light (Nat Geo) as Miep Gies
**Outstanding Performance by a Male Actor in a Drama Series**: **Pedro Pascal – The Last of Us (HBO) as Joel Miller**; Brian Cox – Succession (HBO) as Logan Roy; Billy Crudup – The Morning Show (Apple TV+) as Cory Ellison; Kieran Culkin – Succession (HBO) as Roman Roy; Matthew Macfadyen – Succession (HBO) as Tom Wambsgans	**Outstanding Performance by a Female Actor in a Drama Series**: **Elizabeth Debicki – The Crown (Netflix) as Princess Diana**; Jennifer Aniston – The Morning Show (Apple TV+) as Alex Levy; Bella Ramsey – The Last of Us (HBO) as Ellie; Keri Russell – The Diplomat (Netflix) as Kate Wyler; Sarah Snook – Succession (HBO) as Shiv Roy
**Outstanding Performance by a Male Actor in a Comedy Series**: **Jeremy Allen White – The Bear (FX / Hulu) as Carmen "Carmy" Berzatto**; Brett Goldstein – Ted Lasso (Apple TV+) as Roy Kent; Bill Hader – Barry (HBO) as Barry Berkman; Ebon Moss-Bachrach – The Bear (FX / Hulu) as Richard "Richie" Jerimovich; Jason Sudeikis – Ted Lasso (Apple TV+) as Ted Lasso	**Outstanding Performance by a Female Actor in a Comedy Series**: **Ayo Edebiri – The Bear (FX / Hulu) as Sydney Adamu**; Alex Borstein – The Marvelous Mrs. Maisel (Prime Video) as Susie Myerson; Rachel Brosnahan – The Marvelous Mrs. Maisel (Prime Video) as Miriam "Midge" Maisel; Quinta Brunson – Abbott Elementary (ABC) as Janine Teagues; Hannah Waddingham – Ted Lasso (Apple TV+) as Rebecca Welton
**Outstanding Performance by an Ensemble in a Drama Series**: **Succession (HBO) – Nicholas Braun, Juliana Canfield, Brian Cox, Kieran Culkin, Dagmara Domińczyk, Peter Friedman, Justine Lupe, Matthew Macfadyen, Arian Moayed, Scott Nicholson, David Rasche, Alan Ruck, Alexander Skarsgård, J. Smith-Cameron, Sarah Snook, Fisher Stevens, Jeremy Strong, and Zoë Winters**; The Crown (Netflix) – Khalid Abdalla, Sebastian Blunt, Bertie Carvel, Salim Daw, Elizabeth Debicki, Luther Ford, Claudia Harrison, Lesley Manville, Ed McVey, James Murray, Jonathan Pryce, Imelda Staunton, Marcia Warren, Dominic West, and Olivia Williams; The Gilded Age (HBO) – Ben Ahlers, Ashlie Atkinson, Christine Baranski, Denée Benton, Nicole Brydon Bloom, Michael Cerveris, Carrie Coon, Kelley Curran, Taissa Farmiga, David Furr, Jack Gilpin, Ward Horton, Louisa Jacobson, Simon Jones, Sullivan Jones, Celia Keenan-Bolger, Nathan Lane, Matilda Lawler, Robert Sean Leonard, Audra McDonald, Debra Monk, Donna Murphy, Kristine Nielsen, Cynthia Nixon, Kelli O'Hara, Patrick Page, Harry Richardson, Taylor Richardson, Blake Ritson, Jeremy Shamos, Douglas Sills, Morgan Spector, John Douglas Thompson, and Erin Wilhelmi; The Last of Us (HBO) – Pedro Pascal and Bella Ramsey; The Morning Show (Apple TV+) – Jennifer Aniston, Nicole Beharie, Shari Belafonte, Néstor Carbonell, Billy Crudup, Mark Duplass, Jon Hamm, Theo Iyer, Hannah Leder, Greta Lee, Julianna Margulies, Tig Notaro, Karen Pittman, and Reese Witherspoon
**Outstanding Performance by an Ensemble in a Comedy Series**: **The Bear (FX / Hulu) – Lionel Boyce, Jose Cervantes Jr., Liza Colón-Zayas, Ayo Edebiri, Abby Elliott, Richard Esteras, Edwin Lee Gibson, Molly Gordon, Corey Hendrix, Matty Matheson, Ebon Moss-Bachrach, Oliver Platt, and Jeremy Allen White**; Abbott Elementary (ABC) – Quinta Brunson, William Stanford Davis, Janelle James, Chris Perfetti, Sheryl Lee Ralph, Lisa Ann Walter, and Tyler James Williams; Barry (HBO) – Anthony Carrigan, Sarah Goldberg, Zachary Golinger, Bill Hader, Andre Hyland, Fred Melamed, Charles Parnell, Stephen Root, Tobie Windham, Henry Winkler, and Robert Wisdom; Only Murders in the Building (Hulu) – Gerald Caesar, Michael Cyril Creighton, Linda Emond, Selena Gomez, Allison Guinn, Steve Martin, Ashley Park, Don Darryl Rivera, Paul Rudd, Jeremy Shamos, Martin Short, Meryl Streep, Wesley Taylor, Jason Veasey, and Jesse Williams; Ted Lasso (Apple TV+) – Annette Badland, Kola Bokinni, Edyta Budnik, Adam Colborne, Phil Dunster, Cristo Fernández, Kevin "KG" Garry, Brett Goldstein, Billy Harris, Anthony Head, Brendan Hunt, Toheeb Jimoh, James Lance, Nick Mohammed, Jason Sudeikis, Jeremy Swift, Juno Temple, Hannah Waddingham, Bronson Webb, and Katy Wix
**Outstanding Performance by a Stunt Ensemble in a Television Series**: **The Last of Us (HBO)**; Ahsoka (Disney+); Barry (HBO); Beef (Netflix); The Mandalorian (Disney+)

=== Screen Actors Guild Life Achievement Award ===
- Barbra Streisand

== Multiple nominations ==
=== Film ===
Nominations	Film
4	Barbie
4	Oppenheimer
3	American Fiction
3	Killers of the Flower Moon
2	The Color Purple
2	The Holdovers
2	Maestro
2	Nyad
2	Poor Things

=== Television ===
Nominations	Program
5	Succession
4	The Bear
4	The Last of Us
4	Ted Lasso
3	Barry
3	Beef
3	The Morning Show
2	Abbott Elementary
2	The Crown
2	The Marvelous Mrs. Maisel

== Multiple wins ==
=== Film ===
Wins	Film
3	Oppenheimer

=== Television ===
Wins	Program
3	The Bear
2	The Last of Us

== In Memoriam ==
The segment, introduced by Naomi Watts, honoring the following who died in 2023 and early 2024.

- Richard Roundtree
- Glynis Johns
- David Soul
- George Maharis
- Angus Cloud
- David McKnight
- Paxton Whitehead
- Shelley Smith
- David McCallum
- Joss Ackland
- Frances Sternhagen
- Ray Stevenson
- Mark Goddard
- Jim Brown
- Dick Butkus
- Bill Hayes
- Julian Sands
- Jeffrey Carlson
- Burt Young
- Adan Canto
- Ellen Holly
- Nicolas Coster
- Joanna Merlin
- Barry Newman
- Tyler Christopher
- Suzanne Shepherd
- Casey Kramer
- Ron Cephas Jones
- Billy Miller
- Hinton Battle
- Carlin Glynn
- Maurice Hines
- Chita Rivera
- Don Murray
- Joseph Melendez
- David Emge
- Andrea Fay Friedman
- Tom Smothers
- Suzanne Somers
- Richard Moll
- Inga Swenson
- Mark Margolis
- Treat Williams
- Michael Gambon
- Sharon Farrell
- Conrad E. Palmisano
- Gary Kent
- Tina Turner
- Paul Reubens
- Michael Lerner
- Shecky Greene
- James McCaffrey
- Lance Reddick
- Arleen Sorkin
- Kamar de los Reyes
- Richard Romanus
- Lee Sun-kyun
- Chaim Topol
- Piper Laurie
- Tom Sizemore
- Frederic Forrest
- Joyce Randolph
- Ryan O'Neal
- Glenda Jackson
- Andre Braugher
- Alan Arkin
- Carl Weathers
- Tom Wilkinson
- Matthew Perry
- Harry Belafonte

== Presenters ==
The awards and segments were presented by the following individuals:

Presenters at the ceremony
Name(s)	Role
Idris Elba	Presented the highlights of nominated acting performances
Meryl Streep; Emily Blunt; Anne Hathaway	Presented Outstanding Performance by a Male Actor in a Comedy Series
Issa Rae; Glen Powell	Presented Outstanding Performance by a Female Actor in a Miniseries or Television Movie
Margot Robbie; America Ferrera	Presented the film Barbie on the Outstanding Performance by a Cast in a Motion Picture segment
Melissa McCarthy; Billie Eilish	Presented Outstanding Performance by a Female Actor in a Comedy Series
Erika Alexander; Tracee Ellis Ross; Sterling K. Brown; Jeffrey Wright	Presented the film American Fiction on the Outstanding Performance by a Cast in a Motion Picture segment
Phil Dunster; Storm Reid	Presented Outstanding Performance by a Male Actor in a Drama Series
Elijah Wood; Sean Astin	Presented Outstanding Performance by a Female Actor in a Supporting Role
Lily Gladstone; Robert De Niro; Tantoo Cardinal	Presented the film Killers of the Flower Moon on the Outstanding Performance by a Cast in a Motion Picture segment
Greta Lee; Troy Kotsur	Presented Outstanding Performance by a Male Actor in a Miniseries or Television Movie
The Cast of Modern Family	Presented Outstanding Performance by an Ensemble in a Comedy Series
Jennifer Aniston; Bradley Cooper	Presented the Screen Actors Guild Life Achievement Award for Barbra Streisand
Idris Elba	Presented Outstanding Performance by a Male Actor in a Supporting Role
Alexander Skarsgård; Omar Sy	Presented Outstanding Performance by a Female Actor in a Drama Series
The Cast of Breaking Bad	Presented Outstanding Performance by an Ensemble in a Drama Series
Emily Blunt; Robert Downey Jr. Cillian Murphy	Presented the film Oppenheimer on the Outstanding Performance by a Cast in a Motion Picture segment
Naomi Watts	Presented the In Memoriam tribute
Brendan Fraser	Presented Outstanding Performance by a Male Actor in a Leading Role
Danielle Brooks; Halle Bailey; Taraji P. Henson	Presented the film The Color Purple on the Outstanding Performance by a Cast in a Motion Picture segment
Jessica Chastain	Presented Outstanding Performance by a Female Actor in a Leading Role
Geena Davis; Jeff Goldblum	Presented Outstanding Performance by a Cast in a Motion Picture
