= 2018 British Academy Television Craft Awards =

Technical achievements in TV awards ceremony

19th British Academy Television Craft Awards
- Date: 2 April 2018
- Site: The Brewery, London
- Hosted by: Stephen Mangan

Highlights
- Best Direction: Philippa Lowthorpe (Fiction); Charlie Russell (Factual); Three Girls (Fiction); Chris Packham: Asperger’s and Me (Factual)
- Most awards: This Country / Three Girls (2)
- Most nominations: The Crown (7)

The 19th Annual British Academy Television Craft Awards are presented by the British Academy of Film and Television Arts (BAFTA) and was held on 22 April 2018. For the sixth consecutive year, Stephen Mangan was the ceremony's host. The awards were held at The Brewery, City of London, and given in recognition of technical achievements in British television of 2017. The Crown lead the nominations with seven followed by Taboo with six.

== Winners and nominees ==
Winners will be listed first and highlighted in boldface.

Special Award

- **Game of Thrones**

Best Breakthrough Talent	Best Director: Multi-Camera
**Daisy May Cooper** (writer), **Charlie Cooper** (writer) – **This Country**; Bernard MacMahon (director), Allison McGourty (Writer, Producer and Music Supervisor) – American Epic: The Sessions; Tom Pursey (director and producer) – Fighting Cancer: My Online Diary; Charlotte Wolf (writer) – Inspector George Gently	**Julia Knowles** – **World War One Remembered: Passchendaele**; James Morgan – Wild Alaska Live; Nikki Parsons – Strictly Come Dancing; Chris Power – Ant & Dec's Saturday Night Takeaway
Best Director: Fiction	Best Director: Factual
**Philippa Lowthorpe** – **Three Girls**; Jane Campion – Top of the Lake: China Girl; Mackenzie Crook – Detectorists; Paul Wittington – Little Boy Blue	**Charlie Russell** – **Chris Packham: Asperger’s and Me**; Anna Hall – Catching a Killer: The Search for Natalie Hemming; Will Yapp – The Real Full Monty; Xavier Alford – Drugsland: Heroin Love Story
Best Writer: Drama	Best Writer: Comedy
**Nicole Taylor** – **Three Girls**; Charlie Brooker – Hang the DJ (Black Mirror); Steven Knight – Peaky Blinders; Peter Morgan – The Crown	**Reece Shearsmith** and **Steve Pemberton** – **Inside No. 9**; Daisy May Cooper and Charlie Cooper – This Country; Paul Coleman, Peter Kay and Sian Gibson – Peter Kay's Car Share; Rob Delaney and Sharon Horgan – Catastrophe
Best Editing: Fiction	Best Editing: Factual
**Three Girls** - **Úna Ní Dhonghaíle**; Line of Duty (Episode 4) - Andrew John McClelland; Peaky Blinders (Episode 5) - Dan Roberts; The Crown (Paterfamilias) - Pia di Ciaula	**Chris Packham: Asperger’s and Me** - **Will Grayburn**; Blue Planet II (for "One Ocean) - Matt Meech; Blue Planet II (for "The Deep") - Nigel Buck; David Bowie: The Last Five Years - Ged Murphy; Louis Theroux: Dark States (for "Heroin Town") - Anna Price
Best Costume Design	Best Make Up & Hair Design
**Game of Thrones** - **Michele Clapton**; Peaky Blinders - Alison McCosh; The Crown - Jane Petrie; Taboo - Joanna Eatwell	**Taboo** - **Jan Archivald, Erika Ökvist, Audrey Doyle**; The Miniaturist - Chrissie Baker; Gunpowder - Jacqueline Fowler; Peaky Blinders - Loz Schiavo
Best Production Design	Best Original Music
**Game of Thrones** - **Deborah Riley, Rob Cameron**; USS Callister (Black Mirror) - Joel Collins, Phil Sims; The Crown - Martin Childs, Alison Harvey; The State - Pat Campbell	**King Charles III** - **Jocelyn Pook**; Born to be Free: Saving Russia’s Whales - Katya Mihailova; Taboo - Max Richter; Howards End - Nico Muhly
Best Photography: Fiction	Best Photography: Factual
**The Crown (Beryl)** - **Adriano Goldman**; Against the Law - Johann Perry; Taboo - Mark Patten; USS Callister (Black Mirror) - Stephan Pehrsson	**Blue Planet II (for "One Ocean")** - **Camera Team**; The Detectives: Murder on the Streets - Daniel Vernon, Daniel Dewsbury; Last Men in Aleppo - Fadi Al-Halabi, Hassan Kattan, Thaer Mohammed; The Fight for Mosul (Dispatches) - Olivier Sarbil
Best Titles & Graphic Identity	Best Special, Visual & Graphic Effects
**SS-GB** - **William Barlett**; Blue Planet II - BDH Creative; Have I Got News for You - Liquid TV; Top of the Lake: China Girl - Morgan Beringer	**Metalhead (Black Mirror)** - **Jean-Clement Soret, Russell McLean, Joel Collins**; Taboo - Adam Glasman, Rob Pizzey; The Crown - Asa Shoul, Christopher Reynolds; Emerald City - Thomas Horton
Best Sound: Fiction	Best Sound: Factual
**The Crown** - **Sound Team**; Peaky Blinders (Episode 6) - Forbes Noonan, Ben Norrington, Jim Goddard, Grant Bridgeman; Sherlock - Sound Team; Taboo - Sound Team	**Blue Planet II (for "Coral Reefs")** - **Graham Wild, Tim Owens, Kate Hopkins**; David Bowie: The Last Five Years - Karl Mainzer, Rowan Jennings, Adam Scourfield, Sean O'Neil; Mountain: Life at the Extreme (Himalaya) - Graham Wild, George Fry, James Burchill; The Grand Tour - Russell Edwards, Trisan Powell, Robert Entwistle, Marc Wojtanowski; World War One Remembered: Passchendaele - Andy Deacon, Kevin Duff, Andy James, Mark McLoughlin
Best Entertainment Craft Team
**World War One Remembered: Passchendaele** - **Nigel Catmur, David Cole, Kate Dawkins, Kevin Duff**; One Love Manchester - Richard Valentine, Toby Alington, Simon Sanders; Strictly Come Dancing - Jason Gilkison, Mark Kenyon, Patrick Doherty, David Newton; The Voice UK - Dave Davey, David Tench, Dominic Tolfts, Kevin Duff

== Programmes with multiple nominations ==
Programmes that received multiple nominations
Nominations	Programme
7	The Crown
6	Taboo
5	Blue Planet II
5	Peaky Blinders
4	Black Mirror
3	Three Girls
3	World War One Remembered: Passchendaele
2	Chris Packham: Asperger’s and Me
2	David Bowie: The Last Five Years
2	Game of Thrones
2	Strictly Come Dancing
2	This Country
2	Top of the Lake : China Girl

== Most major wins ==
Shows that received multiple awards
Wins	Show
2	Game of Thrones
2	Three Girls
2	Blue Planet II
2	Chris Packham: Asperger’s and Me
2	The Crown
2	World War One Remembered: Passchendaele

Wins by Network
Wins	Network
9	BBC One
4	BBC Two
3	HBO
3	Netflix
3	Sky Atlantic

== See also ==
- 2018 British Academy Television Awards
