= The Crown season 6 =

The Crown
- Season 6
- Promotional poster
- Starring: Imelda Staunton; Jonathan Pryce; Lesley Manville; Dominic West; Elizabeth Debicki; Olivia Williams; Bertie Carvel; Claudia Harrison; Marcia Warren; Khalid Abdalla; Salim Daw; Ed McVey; Luther Ford; Meg Bellamy
- No. of episodes: 10

Release
- Original network: Netflix
- Original release: 16 November – 14 December 2023

Season chronology
- ← Previous; Season 5

The sixth and final season of The Crown, which follows the life and reign of Queen Elizabeth II, was released by Netflix in two volumes. The first volume of four episodes was released on 16 November 2023, and the second, consisting of six episodes, was released on 14 December. The season began production shortly before the death of Queen Elizabeth II on 8 September 2022.

== Premise ==
The Crown portrays the reign of Queen Elizabeth II, from her wedding in 1947 through to the early 21st century.

The sixth season is set from 1997 to 2005, during the premiership of Tony Blair. Events depicted include the death of Diana, Princess of Wales, the Golden Jubilee of Elizabeth II, the deaths of Princess Margaret and Queen Elizabeth the Queen Mother, the early relationship of Prince William and Catherine Middleton, and the wedding of Prince Charles and Camilla Parker Bowles.

== Cast ==
=== Main ===
- Imelda Staunton as Queen Elizabeth II
- Jonathan Pryce as Prince Philip, Duke of Edinburgh, Elizabeth's husband
- Lesley Manville as Princess Margaret, Countess of Snowdon, Elizabeth's younger sister
- Dominic West as Charles, Prince of Wales, Elizabeth and Philip's eldest child and the heir apparent
- Olivia Williams as Camilla Parker Bowles; later the Duchess of Cornwall, Charles's long-time lover
- Bertie Carvel as Prime Minister Tony Blair
- Claudia Harrison as Anne, Princess Royal, Elizabeth and Philip's second child and only daughter
- Marcia Warren as Queen Elizabeth the Queen Mother, widow of King George VI, mother of Queen Elizabeth II and Princess Margaret
- Salim Daw as Mohamed Al-Fayed, Dodi Fayed's father
- Khalid Abdalla as Dodi Fayed, Diana's lover who died alongside her in the 1997 car crash
- Elizabeth Debicki as Diana, Princess of Wales, Charles's ex-wife
- Ed McVey as Prince William of Wales, Charles and Diana's elder son and the second-in-line to the British throne
- Luther Ford as Prince Harry of Wales, Charles and Diana's younger son and the third-in-line to the British throne
- Meg Bellamy as Catherine Middleton, a classmate of Prince William

==== Featured ====
The following actors are credited in the opening titles of episodes in which they play a significant role:

- Eve Best as Carole Middleton, mother of Catherine Middleton
- Viola Prettejohn as teenage Princess Elizabeth
- Beau Gadsdon as teenage Princess Margaret
- Claire Foy as young Queen Elizabeth
- Olivia Colman as middle-aged Queen Elizabeth

=== Recurring ===
- Rufus Kampa as young Prince William of Wales
- Fflyn Edwards as young Prince Harry of Wales
- Ben Lloyd-Hughes as Mark Bolland, public-relations executive and deputy private secretary to Prince Charles
- Alex Blake as Stephen Lamport, private secretary to Prince Charles
- Lee Otway as Kez Wingfield, a bodyguard employed by Dodi Fayed
- Harry Anton as Trevor Rees-Jones, a bodyguard employed by Dodi Fayed
- Paul Gorostidi as Philippe Dourneau, Dodi Fayed's chauffeur
- Hanna Alström as Heini Wathén, Mohamed Al-Fayed's wife
- Lydia Leonard as Cherie Blair, Tony Blair's wife
- Mohammed Kamel as Ali Fayed, Mohamed's brother and Dodi's paternal uncle
- Semo Salha as Salah Fayed, Mohamed's brother and Dodi's paternal uncle
- Andrew Havill as Robert Fellowes, Elizabeth's private secretary (who retired in 1999) and brother-in-law of Princess Diana
- Jamie Parker as Robin Janvrin, Elizabeth's deputy private secretary (and private secretary from 1999)
- Theo Fraser Steele as Timothy Laurence, Princess Anne's husband
- James Murray as Prince Andrew, Duke of York, Elizabeth and Philip's third child
- Sebastian Blunt as Prince Edward, Earl of Wessex, Elizabeth and Philip's youngest child
- Adam Damerell as Alastair Campbell, Labour Party strategist and adviser to Tony Blair
- Charlotte Melia as Anji Hunter, adviser to Tony Blair
- Blake Ritson as Andrew Gailey, Prince William's housemaster at Eton College
- Isaac Rouse as Ollie Chadwyck-Healey, close friend of Prince William
- Charlie Beaven as Charlie Nelson, close friend of Prince William
- Jack Cunningham-Nuttall as Fergus Boyd, close friend of Prince William
- Tim Dutton as Michael Middleton, father of Kate Middleton
- Matilda Broadbridge as Philippa 'Pippa' Middleton, sister of Kate Middleton
- Daniel Burt as James Middleton, younger brother of Kate Middleton
- Martin Turner as the Earl of Airlie, Lord Chamberlain and brother-in-law of Princess Alexandra, The Hon. Lady Ogilvy

=== Notable guests ===
- Ella Bright as young Catherine Middleton
- Erin Richards as Kelly Fisher, Dodi Fayed's fiancée
- Jana Quiles as Jasmine Fayed, Mohamed's daughter and Dodi's half-sister
- Kian Noam as Karim Fayed, Mohamed's son and Dodi's half-brother
- Rai Maiques as Omar Fayed, Mohamed's son and Dodi's half-brother
- Irene Barbero as Camilla Fayed, Mohamed's daughter and Dodi's half-sister
- Amira Ghazalla as Selma, Mohamed's secretary
- Enzo Cilenti as Mario Brenna, Italian paparazzo
- Forbes Masson as Duncan Muir, Scottish photographer
- Kate Cook as Susie Orbach, Princess Diana's therapist
- Yoann Blanc as Henri Paul, deputy head of security at Hôtel Ritz Paris
- Philip Cumbus as Charles Spencer, 9th Earl Spencer, brother of Princess Diana
- Justine Mitchell as Lady Sarah McCorquodale, Princess Diana's eldest sister
- Annette Flynn as Lady Jane Fellowes, Princess Diana's older sister, the wife of Robert Fellowes
- Eric Colvin as Michael Jay, British Ambassador to France
- Christophe Guybet as Jean-Pierre Chevènement, French Minister of the Interior
- Laurent C. Lucas as Jacques Chirac, President of France
- Richard Rycroft as George Carey, the Archbishop of Canterbury
- Polly Frame as Sally Morgan, adviser to Tony Blair
- Thomas Nelstrop as Jonathan Powell, adviser to Tony Blair
- Honor Swinton Byrne as Lola Airedale-Cavendish-Kincaid, ex-girlfriend of Prince William
- Oli Green as Rupert Finch, ex-boyfriend of Kate Middleton
- Tim Bentinck as the Earl of Carnarvon, Racing Manager to the Queen
  - Joe Edgar as young Porchey, Lord Porchester
- Hamish Riddle as Peter Townsend, lover of Princess Margaret, equerry of King George VI
- Imogen Stubbs as Lady Glenconner, lady-in-waiting of Princess Margaret, and wife of Lord Glenconner
- Lorcan Cranitch as Sir John Stevens, Commissioner of the Metropolitan Police
- Jonathan Hyde as the Duke of Norfolk, Earl Marshal of England
- Richard Heap as Rowan Williams, the Archbishop of Canterbury
- Julian Wadham as David Stancliffe, the Bishop of Salisbury
- Lizzie Hopley as Angela Kelly, Principal Dresser to the Queen
- Bert Seymour as Tom Parker Bowles, Camilla's son
- Clementine Blake as Laura Parker Bowles, Camilla's daughter
- Emma Laird Craig as Sarah, Duchess of York, ex-wife of Prince Andrew, Duke of York

== Episodes ==
No. overall	No. in season	Title	Directed by	Written by	Original release date
Volume 1
51	1	"Persona Non Grata"	Alex Gabassi	Peter Morgan	16 November 2023
In Paris, a car pursued by paparazzi speeds into the Pont de l'Alma tunnel and crashes. Eight weeks earlier, Diana lobbies Prime Minister Tony Blair for an official role with the government, but the Queen rejects the idea. Diana takes her two sons on a yachting holiday in Saint-Tropez, France, at the invitation of Mohamed Al-Fayed. Prince Charles prepares to throw a party for Camilla's 50th birthday; he petitions the Queen to attend, knowing it will win approval for Camilla, but she refuses. Dodi travels to Saint-Tropez at the insistence of Mohamed, who plans to marry him to Diana to get closer to the British elite, leaving behind his fiancée, Kelly Fisher. Diana gets photographers to leave her sons alone by briefly posing in a bathing suit, upstaging Camilla's party in the newspapers and infuriating Charles. Dodi invites Kelly to Saint-Tropez, but keeps her in a smaller yacht, away from Diana. Dodi confides in Diana about his reconsidering his engagement, and they bond over both of their difficult relationships with their fathers. After hearing about the party from Margaret, the Queen tells Charles that she is happy that he is happy. Dodi tells Diana that she will always be welcome. Returning to Kensington Palace, Diana finds an invitation to Paris.
52	2	"Two Photographs"	Christian Schwochow	Peter Morgan	16 November 2023
The royal family is informed that Diana spent a weekend in Paris with Dodi, which puts pressure on the British government regarding its consistent denial of citizenship to Mohamed, who arranges for a paparazzo photographer to take pictures of Diana and Dodi kissing, leading to a bidding war by the newspapers. The Queen and Diana are warned about the photographs. Diana says farewell to William and Harry, who are going to Balmoral Castle to spend time with Prince Charles, and travels to Bosnia to support the Landmine Survivors Network charity. However, her work is overshadowed by the publication of the photographs. Charles's public relations adviser, Mark Bolland, informs him that Dodi is being sued by his fiancée for breach of contract and urges him to counter Diana with his own photographs. Charles persuades William and Harry to be photographed spending time together at Balmoral. The Queen discusses Diana's erratic behaviour with Prince Philip. Diana retreats to the south of France with Dodi.
53	3	"Dis-Moi Oui"	Christian Schwochow	Peter Morgan	16 November 2023
Diana decides to return to London. Mohamed tells Dodi that if he marries Diana, he will make Dodi an equal partner in his company. At Monte Carlo, Diana and Dodi continue to be pursued by paparazzi. They enter a jewellery shop for refuge; Dodi asks if there's anything she likes, and she points out a ring. They prepare to return to London, but Dodi plans a stop at Paris to propose to her. At Balmoral, Prince William shoots his first stag deer stalking. Diana and Dodi continue to be pursued by paparazzi in Paris; Diana is stunned when Mohamed offers her Villa Windsor to live with Dodi. Diana and Dodi stay at Hôtel Ritz Paris, where Dodi proposes to Diana with the ring, but she declines, saying their marriage would only make his father happy. They diagnose each other's problems: Dodi tells her that she needs to slow down, and Diana tells him he needs to stop letting his father control his life. Dodi decides to return to his apartment; he, Diana, and Diana's bodyguard Trevor Rees-Jones get into a car at the hotel's rear, driven by the Ritz's head of security Henri Paul, who had been drinking. Pursued by paparazzi, their car speeds into the Pont de l'Alma tunnel and is heard crashing.
54	4	"Aftermath"	Christian Schwochow	Peter Morgan	16 November 2023
Diana dies from the accident, along with Dodi and Henri Paul. A grief-stricken Mohamed travels to Paris to retrieve Dodi's body. Elizabeth, Philip and Charles learn of Diana's death; Charles tells William and Harry. Mohamed returns Diana's possessions to the royal family and writes to them, but the palace does not respond. Charles flies to Paris to accompany Diana's coffin back to England; he has a vision of Diana and expresses his regret. At Balmoral, Charles tells Elizabeth and Philip of the reactions he witnessed and pushes for a more public response from the family. Mohamed buries his son and has a vision of Dodi, in which each regrets the mistakes of the other. William leaves Balmoral without informing anyone and returns fourteen hours later. The royal family faces a public backlash at its muted response. Elizabeth has a vision of Diana; she then agrees to a ceremonial funeral and travels to London. Philip, Charles, William, Harry and Diana's brother, Charles Spencer, walk behind the funeral procession. Elizabeth delivers a televised address memorializing Diana.
Volume 2
55	5	"Willsmania"	May el-Toukhy	Jonathan Wilson and Peter Morgan	14 December 2023
Following the death of Diana, Charles struggles to connect with William, now 15 years old. William insists on returning to boarding at Eton College immediately and throw himself into his studies, despite assurances that he can take it slowly. He begins to receive fan mail and enthusiastic reactions from crowds of young girls at official events, which he finds uncomfortable. He later reluctantly joins Charles and Harry in an official visit to Canada. While on a skiing holiday in Whistler, British Columbia, William tells Charles he "hates" the press and crowds. Charles tells the Queen and Philip that he thinks William is struggling to cope with Diana's death. William is invited to tea with the Queen and Philip, but is instead met by Charles. He accuses Charles of driving Diana to her death. Philip meets William and proposes that his frustration lies with the legacy left by his mother, but since he cannot be angry at her, he is angry at Charles instead. William visits Charles and they share a hug as Philip, reflecting on his own mistakes as a father to Charles, looks on. William later visits his mother's grave at Althorp.
56	6	"Ruritania"	Erik Richter Strand	Daniel Marc Janes and Peter Morgan	14 December 2023
The opening weeks of the NATO bombing of Yugoslavia during the Kosovo War results in little progress, causing Prime Minister Blair to propose a ground invasion, but US President Bill Clinton is reluctant to commit American troops. Blair tours the US and gives a speech rallying American public opinion, causing Clinton to change his mind, resulting in Yugoslavian president Slobodan Milošević withdrawing his forces from Kosovo. With Blair continuing to enjoy higher popularity than the Queen, the Queen asks Blair to look into ways the monarchy can modernise. Blair's proposals included cutting positions in the Royal Household and scaling back ceremonies such as the State Opening of Parliament. After interviewing the people working in those positions, the Queen decides not to proceed with the proposals. However, her private secretary, Robert Fellowes, resigns to make way for Robin Janvrin. The Queen has a nightmare about Blair being crowned as the new monarch amid chants of Things Can Only Get Better. Blair suffers a setback when his speech at a Women's Institute event is heckled.
57	7	"Alma Mater"	May el-Toukhy	Jonathan Wilson and Peter Morgan	14 December 2023
During Christmas in 1996, a teenage Kate Middleton and her mother Carole Middleton have a brief encounter with William and Diana. Noticing that Kate has a crush on William, Carole reminds her daughter that her husband's grandmother was friendly with the Queen's aunt and that his father was an RAF pilot who'd flown with Prince Philip. Three years later, William graduates from Eton, and after taking a gap year, enrols at the University of St Andrews to study art history. He notices Kate, a popular student, doing the same course, and becomes attracted to her. He strikes up a conversation with her, which initially goes well, but then accidentally offends her, causing her to storm off. He later apologises, but is disappointed to find she has a boyfriend. Kate takes her boyfriend to meet her family for Christmas, but notices her mother's reaction. Kate accuses her mother of trying to set her up with William, by suggesting she change universities to St Andrews and participating in the same gap year activities as William. Carole tells Kate that William is contemplating leaving university. Kate sends a text message to William asking him not to leave.
58	8	"Ritz"	Alex Gabassi	Meriel Sheibani-Clare and Peter Morgan	14 December 2023
On Victory in Europe Day in 1945, Princesses Elizabeth and Margaret join the celebrating crowds outside Buckingham Palace and find their way to the Ritz Hotel. Elizabeth ventures to a downstairs nightclub where she dances to jazz music with American servicemen; Margaret glimpses her and is stunned by her carefreeness. In 1998, Margaret suffers a stroke while vacationing in Mustique and returns home to England, where her doctors tell her she must give up drinking and smoking and undergo physical rehabilitation. Margaret suffers another stroke, severely burning her feet in the process, and returns to London where Elizabeth can care for her. At Margaret's 70th birthday party at the Ritz, she begins to tell the story of her and Elizabeth's night out in 1945, but Elizabeth stops her by proposing a toast to her sister's dutiful support of her. As Elizabeth cares for Margaret, Margaret says that no one who is unaware of their secret night out will ever understand how much Elizabeth had to give up when she became Queen. Margaret's health further declines after a third stroke, and an epilogue reveals she died in her sleep in 2002.
59	9	"Hope Street"	Erik Richter Strand	Jonathan Wilson and Peter Morgan	14 December 2023
Mohamed Al-Fayed accuses the royal family of orchestrating the deaths of Diana and Dodi, leading to an inquiry by the Metropolitan Police, Operation Paget. William learns that Kate is single, and attends a charity fashion show where Kate models a sheer dress to catch his attention. Queen Elizabeth the Queen Mother dies, and William returns to England for her funeral. Elizabeth asks William to participate in her Golden Jubilee after being encouraged by Tony Blair, but she allows him to excuse himself to give him some semblance of a normal life at university. Charles, William and Harry are interviewed for the inquiry. Sir John Stevens, the leader of the inquiry, announces that the inquiry found no evidence of foul play. William joins Kate and her family to watch the jubilee on television, but while watching it, he decides to return to London to join his family. William and Kate begin a relationship and move into a flat together with friends.
60	10	"Sleep, Dearie Sleep"	Stephen Daldry	Peter Morgan	14 December 2023
As the Queen's 80th birthday nears, her advisers ask to begin planning Operation London Bridge, the plans for her state funeral. Charles asks the Queen for permission to marry Camilla, but she is reluctant to give it. After consulting with the bishops, and William and Harry, she grants Charles and Camilla permission. Elizabeth selects the lament "Sleep, Dearie, Sleep" to be played at her funeral after the royal bagpiper suggests it. William, Kate and Harry attend a costume party where Harry is photographed wearing a Nazi uniform with a swastika armband, and he is condemned by the media. A rift develops between William and Harry, though they later reconcile. Elizabeth sees her middle-aged self encouraging her to abdicate, while a vision of her younger self later encourages her to continue. Charles and Camilla marry, and the Queen delivers a speech at the blessing at St George's Chapel. Philip commends Elizabeth on her decision not to abdicate. The Queen, alone in the chapel, sees visions of her coffin and her younger selves as "Sleep, Dearie, Sleep" plays, before leaving through the West Door, disappearing into white light. (Note: Interpreted as an allusion to the Queen's eventual death on 8 September 2022.)

== Production ==
=== Development ===
Although the series was initially planned to run for six seasons, in January 2020, creator Peter Morgan announced that it would instead conclude with the fifth season. However, in July 2020, Morgan reversed his decision and announced that the series would end with a sixth season as originally planned, saying, "As we started to discuss the storylines for Season 5, it soon became clear that in order to do justice to the richness and complexity of the story we should go back to the original plan and do six seasons. To be clear, Season 6 will not bring us any closer to present-day—it will simply enable us to cover the same period in greater detail."

=== Casting ===
In January 2020, Imelda Staunton was announced as succeeding Colman as the Queen in the fifth season, and her role in the final sixth season was reported in July. The same month, Lesley Manville was announced as portraying Princess Margaret, and the following month, Jonathan Pryce and Elizabeth Debicki were cast as Prince Philip and Diana, Princess of Wales, respectively. In October 2020, Dominic West was in talks to play Prince Charles and was officially confirmed as part of the cast in April 2021. In June 2021, Olivia Williams announced that she would portray Camilla Parker Bowles. In September 2022, Rufus Kampa and Ed McVey were cast as Prince William, while Meg Bellamy was cast as Kate Middleton. Viola Prettejohn was cast as young Elizabeth, while Beau Gadsdon reprised her role as young Margaret, for flashback scenes set on Victory in Europe Day.

=== Filming ===
Filming for the season began in early September 2022, but was paused following the death of Queen Elizabeth II on 8 September 2022. On that day, Manville said she filmed an "emotional scene" between her character, Princess Margaret, and the Queen in hospital, and the scene was finished at around 16:00 BST. The real-life Queen's death was publicly announced two and a half hours later.

Production resumed the following week, but was paused again on the day of the Queen's funeral on 19 September 2022. Filming wrapped on 21 April 2023, the day of what would have been the Queen's 97th birthday.

=== Music ===
The Crown: Season Six

Soundtrack album by Martin Phipps
- Released: 14 December 2023
- Genre: Soundtrack
- Length: 39:52
- Label: Sony Music

Martin Phipps soundtrack chronology
Napoleon (2023)	The Crown: Season Six (2023)

No.	Title	Length
1.	"William"	2:27
2.	"Charles & Camilla"	2:08
3.	"Lost in Space"	3:19
4.	"Mohamed's Drum"	5:19
5.	"Holding Hands"	3:32
6.	"Queen's Speech"	3:37
7.	"Chorale"	2:18
8.	"Sacrifice"	3:08
9.	"Orders & Customs"	2:35
10.	"Limerick Re-Imagined"	2:36
11.	"Funeral Preparations"	4:29
12.	"Leave You to It (Sleep Dearie Sleep)"	4:18
Total length:		39:52

=== "Ghost of Diana" controversy ===
Shortly after releasing the teaser for season 6 on 9 October 2023, Netflix ran into controversy after an insider described a scene in which Diana would appear as a ghost in front of her ex-husband, Charles, and his mother, the Queen. After a backlash, a Netflix spokesperson claimed that: "These sensitive and thoughtful imagined conversations seek to bring to life the depth of emotion that was felt after such a seismic tragedy struck at the heart of the family." Peter Morgan said of the scenes, "I never imagined it as Diana's 'ghost' in the traditional sense — it was her continuing to live vividly in the minds of those she has left behind."

On the other hand, an identical ghost-scene involving Dodi Al-Fayed attracted hardly any attention or controversy, just as the showing of his body in the morgue did.

== Release ==
The season was released by the Netflix streaming service in two parts: the first four episodes were released on 16 November 2023, and the remaining six were made available on 14 December 2023. The trailer for the first part was released on 26 October 2023, while the trailer for the second part was released on 1 December 2023. The season was then released on DVD and Blu-ray in the United Kingdom on 16 September 2024 and worldwide the following day.

== Critical response ==
According to review aggregator Metacritic, the first volume of the season received "generally favorable" reviews, based on a weighted average score of 61 out 100 from 29 critics' reviews. On Rotten Tomatoes, 54% of 85 reviews are positive and the average rating is 6.1/10. The website's critics consensus states, "Elizabeth Debicki's haunting portrayal does right by the Princess of Wales, but The Crown's final season often feels like a reign extended past its prime." The BBC reported that the first four episodes "have split critics, but many have given [them] the thumbs down" in the UK, while French reviews largely praised them. The cast's performances, especially those of Debicki, Staunton, and West, were widely praised, including by critics who reviewed the season more negatively. (Note: Attributed to multiple references:)

In a top-marked review for Newsday, Verne Gay praised the four episodes, presenting "a cohesive and deeply moving picture" of the last hours of Diana and Dodi, with particular commendation for a humane rather than a more vilified depiction of Dodi. Writing for Variety, Aramide Tinubu contended that by portraying Diana's relationship as "a comforting friendship that had only started to blossom", the show prompts viewers to reflect on the British royal family's choices, juxtaposed against the reigning monarch's stoicism and adherence to tradition, which, according to the reviewer, has led to the monarchy being perceived as "relic-like". Carol Midgley of The Times wrote that, despite some "gauche imaginings" of characters, the majority of performances were "excellent" and the show was still "a compelling piece of television with very high production values that makes you want to see more". Entertainment Weekly's Kristen Baldwin thought Diana and Dodi's romance and their deaths in Paris were depicted with a "wistful, careful, and restrained approach". Lacy Baugher from Paste gave the first part of the season a score of 7.2 out of 10 and considered it to be an "excellent Diana miniseries", but questioned its suitability as the final season, which initially had broader scope and bigger ambitions, due to its perceived simplicity or its potential bias to portray Charles in a "wildly friendly" way. In a mixed review for The Independent, Nick Hilton similarly opined that the series left little to say "about what it means to be British" as it nears its conclusion.

Reviewing the first volume for The Guardian, Lucy Mangan gave it one out of five, describing the "Diana-obsessed series" as "the very definition of bad writing", despite the "brilliant performances from the entire cast". She particularly criticised scenes featuring "Ghost Diana", which is "all of a piece with what is now simply a crass, by-numbers piece of film-making, with a script that barely aspires to craft, let alone art, any more". Caryn James, writing for BBC Culture, said that the series has "failed to right the terrible flaws of the last season", scoring it at two out of five.

In her review of the second volume for Variety, Alison Herman noted that there was a vacuum left by Diana's departure, but that similar to earlier seasons the focus shifted towards the Queen and the final moments were "an articulate expression of why ritual, stasis and pageantry matter". Writing for The New York Times, Mike Hale also noted that by moving past Diana's storyline the show was "back inside the parlors, bedrooms and country houses of Elizabeth and the other Windsors" and was again "in its comfort zone". In her review for The Independent, Katie Rosseinsky gave the second volume two out of five and concluded that "Morgan's drama is haunted by the ghost of past glories" and the people depicted "exist less as characters, more as vessels for exposition and knowing nods to present-day royal in-fighting". Anita Singh of The Telegraph also gave the second volume two out of five and believed that "Morgan had clearly run out of steam", adding that the story of William and Kate's relationship was "sweet but dull".

== Accolades ==
Year	Award	Category	Nominee(s)	Result	Ref.
2024	British Academy Television Awards	Best Actor	Dominic West	Nominated	
2024	British Academy Television Awards	Best Supporting Actor	Salim Daw	Nominated	
2024	British Academy Television Awards	Best Supporting Actress	Elizabeth Debicki	Nominated	
2024	British Academy Television Awards	Best Supporting Actress	Lesley Manville	Nominated	
2024	Golden Globe Awards	Best Television Series – Drama	The Crown	Nominated	
2024	Golden Globe Awards	Best Actor – Television Series Drama	Dominic West	Nominated	
2024	Golden Globe Awards	Best Actress – Television Series Drama	Imelda Staunton	Nominated	
2024	Golden Globe Awards	Best Supporting Actress – Series, Miniseries or Television Film	Elizabeth Debicki	Won	
2024	Screen Actors Guild Awards	Outstanding Performance by a Female Actor in a Drama Series	Elizabeth Debicki	Won	
2024	Screen Actors Guild Awards	Outstanding Performance by an Ensemble in a Drama Series	The ensemble cast (Note: The nominees are Staunton, Debicki, West, Manville, Daw, Abdalla, Pryce, Blunt, Carvel, Ford, Harrison, McVey, Murray, Warren, and Williams.)	Nominated	
2024	Writers Guild of America Awards	Drama Series	Daniel Marc Janes, Peter Morgan, Meriel Sheibani-Clare, Jonathan Wilson	Nominated	
2024	Writers Guild of America Awards	Episodic Drama	Peter Morgan (for "Sleep, Dearie Sleep")	Nominated	
2024	Ivor Novello Award	Best Television Soundtrack	Martin Phipps	Nominated	
2024	Primetime Emmy Awards	Outstanding Drama Series	The Crown	Nominated	
2024	Primetime Emmy Awards	Outstanding Lead Actor in a Drama Series	Dominic West	Nominated	
2024	Primetime Emmy Awards	Outstanding Lead Actress in a Drama Series	Imelda Staunton	Nominated	
2024	Primetime Emmy Awards	Outstanding Supporting Actor in a Drama Series	Jonathan Pryce	Nominated	
2024	Primetime Emmy Awards	Outstanding Supporting Actress in a Drama Series	Elizabeth Debicki	Won	
2024	Primetime Emmy Awards	Outstanding Supporting Actress in a Drama Series	Lesley Manville	Nominated	

== Historical accuracy ==
Episode 1 shows Princess Margaret attending Camilla's 50th birthday party in 1997, though she was not present at the event. The Queen is also keen for Camilla to not be viewed as "wicked", but there were reports that she once referred to her as "that wicked woman" in front of Charles.

In episode 2, Mohamed Al-Fayed hires Italian paparazzo Mario Brenna to take photos of his son Dodi and Diana during their trip in the south of France; however, there is no evidence that Al-Fayed was behind this and Diana's biographer Tina Brown suggests that it was Diana herself who notified Brenna. The episode also suggests that news of Diana's relationship with Dodi broke during her trip to Bosnia and she was disturbed by the media enquiring about them, but in reality, the photos of them did not appear in the papers until a few days after the trip was over.

Episode 3 features a scene during which Diana and Dodi are forced into the Repossi jewellery store in Monte Carlo while trying to escape a group of fans. In reality, Dodi visited the Paris branch of Repossi quietly and purchased a ring which he kept at his apartment, rather than at the Ritz hotel where he and Diana were staying, making the scene showing his proposal fictitious.

Episode 4 focuses on the row within the royal family about whether or not Diana should have a public funeral, which Buckingham Palace denied ever happened. Another fictional plot involves Prince William going missing in Scotland for fourteen hours shortly after his mother's death.

Episode 6 implies that the role of the Herb Strewer was still being carried out during the reign of Elizabeth II. However, since William IV, no other monarch has appointed a Herb Strewer. The last person to hold that post was Anne Fellowes, who fulfilled the role during the coronation of George IV in 1820. The other titles and posts mentioned are still in place today, although some have now become purely ceremonial.

Episode 7 depicts Catherine Middleton and her mother Carole buying a copy of The Big Issue from Prince William and his mother Diana on the street in December 1996; Diana and William never sold any copies of the magazine together. Catherine made it clear that she never met William's mother, Diana, in her 2010 engagement interview. In real life, the two Princesses of Wales never met, making the whole scene of Diana meeting her future daughter-in-law fictional. However, it is likely William and Catherine's paths did cross at one or two school social events. Another plotline involves William dating a fictional character named Lola Airdale-Cavendish-Kincaid, but William did have a real girlfriend before Catherine. The episode also relates William's initial dissatisfaction with St Andrews to his supposed sense of loneliness whereas according to his biographers he was mainly unimpressed with how small and provincial the school was. William does make this point himself in the episode.

Episode 8 correctly shows Princesses Elizabeth and Margaret taking part in VE Day celebrations at The Ritz, though Elizabeth herself reports it was in a party of about 16 people, and there is no record of the sisters visiting the hotel's basement bar the Pink Sink and dancing jitterbug. The episode shows the Queen attending Margaret's 70th birthday accompanied by her childhood friend Porchey rather than Philip who actually attended, and Porchey is depicted as having been part of the group visiting The Ritz in 1945. Both Porchey and Margaret die seemingly not long after as depicted in the episode, in reality within a couple of years.

Episode 9 shows Prince William and Catherine Middleton starting to date after she walks on the stage at a charity fashion show on the day the Queen Mother died. However, the show took place four days before her demise. Both are also shown to spend time together as a couple during the Queen's Golden Jubilee in 2002, but they reportedly did not start dating until 2003. The episode shows Sir John Stevens, who led Operation Paget, publicly refuting Mohamed Al-Fayed's conspiracies about Diana and Dodi's deaths, but no set-piece public speech was delivered by Stevens on the matter. Contrary to what the episode shows Al-Fayed also never left Britain. There were also no credible polls published in the 2000s that suggested more than 50% of the public believed Diana was murdered. The scenes showing William and Harry's relationship falling apart as early as 2002 were also fictional.

Episode 10 features a fictional plotline in which the Queen is shown to self-debate the idea of abdication in favour of her son Charles in the days leading up to his wedding to Camilla.
