= Sleep, Dearie, Sleep =

Traditional Scottish lament

Sleep, Dearie, Sleep is a traditional Scottish lament for the bagpipes. The tune is used as a lament signal in Highland army regiments. It gained prominence when it was played during the state funeral of Queen Elizabeth II on 19 September 2022.

== Lyrics ==
Part lullaby and part lament, "Sleep, Dearie, Sleep" has lyrics in Gaelic and Scots, although it is generally played without lyrics.

Soldier lie down on your wee pickle straw
It's not very broad and it's not very braw
But Soldier it's better than nothing at all
(So) Sleep, Soldier, sleep.

Dearie lie down on your wee pickle straw
It's not very broad and it's not very braw
But Dearie it's better than nothing at all
(So) Sleep, Dearie, sleep.
Sleep, Dearie, sleep.

The Gaelic title, Caidil mo Ghaoil, translates as "Sleep my love." The tune is still used as a Last Post / taps signal call in Highland army regiments.

== Queen's funeral ==
"Sleep, Dearie, Sleep" was played at the end of the state funeral of Queen Elizabeth II at Westminster Abbey. The Queen's piper, Warrant Officer Class 1 (Pipe Major) Paul Burns, whose task was playing the bagpipes outside the Queen's window each morning to wake her up, performed the traditional lament.

== Popular culture ==
"Sleep, Dearie Sleep" is also the title of the series finale of The Crown. The episode depicts the Queen planning her own funeral and the wedding of Prince Charles and Camilla Parker Bowles.
