= Ed McVey =

English actor (born 1999)

- Born: 30 May 1999 (age 27); Devon, England
- Occupation: Actor
- Years active: 2020–present

Ed McVey (born 30 May 1999) is a British actor best known for playing Prince William on the sixth season of the Netflix series The Crown (2023).

== Early life ==
McVey is from Devon where his parents run a pharmaceuticals company. His older brother Tom works for their parents’ business. At 12, McVey decided he wanted to be an actor and appeared in school productions at Blundell's School in Tiverton, including in a production of the Noël Coward play Cavalcade. He went on to attend ArtsEd performing arts school in Chiswick. He graduated in 2021 from the Drama Centre London.

== Career ==
After graduation, he landed an agent. Shortly after, he worked as an usher at London’s Playhouse Theatre during a production of Cabaret starring Eddie Redmayne and Jessie Buckley.

In May 2022, McVey played the character B in the two-hander play An Intervention by Mike Bartlett alongside Rachel De Fontes at the Riverside Studios in Hammersmith, London. On stage, he also appeared in Camp Siegfried at The Old Vic Theatre.

In September 2022, it was announced that McVey would be playing a young Prince William opposite Meg Bellamy as Kate Middleton in the sixth and final season of the Netflix series The Crown. First look images of Bellamy and McVey in costume were revealed in March 2023, and the season was released later that year in November.

== Filmography ==
=== Television ===
Year	Title	Role	Notes
2023	The Crown	Prince William	6 episodes (season 6)

=== Theatre ===
Year	Title	Role	Director	Playwright	Theatre
2022	An Intervention	B	Alice Wordsworth	Mike Bartlett	Riverside Studios
2025	The Talented Mr. Ripley	Tom Ripley	Mark Leipacher	Patricia Highsmith	The Lowry

== Awards and nominations ==
Award	Year	Category	Nominated work	Result	Ref.
Screen Actors Guild Awards	2024	Outstanding Performance by an Ensemble Cast in a Drama Series	The Crown	Nominated	
