= Napoleon (soundtrack) =

Napoleon (Soundtrack from the Apple Original Film)

Film score by Martin Phipps
- Released: November 24, 2023
- Studio: Abbey Road Studios, London
- Genre: Film score
- Length: 47:31
- Label: Milan
- Producer: Martin Phipps

Martin Phipps chronology
The Crown: Season Five (2022)	Napoleon (2023)	The Crown: Season Six (2023)

Napoleon (Soundtrack from the Apple Original Film) is the soundtrack to the 2023 historical drama film Napoleon directed by Ridley Scott. Based on the life of Napoleon Bonaparte, the film stars Joaquin Phoenix as the titular character and featured musical score written and composed by Martin Phipps. It was released by Milan Records on November 24, 2023, two days after the film's release.

== Development ==
Napoleon marked Phipps' maiden collaboration with Scott; during the conversation with Deadline Hollywood's Sound and Screen event, Phipps attributed that the conversation with Scott regarding the film's music was quite tough, but "when he did talk about [the score], he was really talking about the character and not being prescriptive about the music". He never indirectly attributed the specific instruments but wanted him to understand Napoleon's character and how he truly is, and added that:

"[Scott wanted me] to understand that Napoleon was a character and that he was an outsider. He wasn’t a polished aristocrat like many of the officers were in the army, and that’s, in fact, why he escaped the guillotine because he was a low-ranking aristocrat. And he wanted me to represent that in music."

He recalled Scott's ideas on how Napoleon was "not a super popular guy" but a relatively "simple, straightforward" person. This intended him to go with a gangsters-type of tune for the film. Scott attributed the 1975 film Barry Lyndon directed by Stanley Kubrick, which he directed after his unrealized project of the biopic on Napoleon. Tonally the film did not have a score composed for it, but selections of temp tracks that Kubrick curated and edited. Hence, Phipps brought back the similar approach while scoring the film. Most of the pieces he wrote were almost the tracks that have a flavour of the time period that were not scored traditionally. He described it as a "step back" and a "chance to be more specific and particular" regarding the use of music.

== Track listing ==
No.	Title	Length
1.	"Napoleon's Piano"	2:13
2.	"Toulon"	3:25
3.	"Josephine"	3:08
4.	"Soldiers of the 5th Regiment"	4:22
5.	"Ladies in Waiting"	1:52
6.	"Austerlitz Kyrie" (Martin Phipps and Ensemble Organum)	2:55
7.	"We Are Discovered"	6:04
8.	"Make the Rain Stop"	2:07
9.	"Look Down"	1:58
10.	"First Counsel"	2:47
11.	"Russia"	4:14
12.	"Return to France"	1:47
13.	"Waterloo Requiem"	4:24
14.	"Downfall" (Martin Phipps and Ensemble Organum)	3:32
15.	"Bonaparte's Lament" (Martin Phipps and Ensemble Spartimu)	2:43
Total length:		47:31

== Reception ==
David Rooney of The Hollywood Reporter called Phipps' score as "wide-ranging" and the use of period music as "inventive". Manuel of FandomWire wrote "Martin Phipps' thunderous score also contributes to the cinematic experience that warrants a big screen". Peter Debruge of Variety described Phipps' score as "epic". Devansh Sharma of Hindustan Times wrote "Composer Martin Phipps replaces the celebratory music of the French Revolution with a more reflective score, as shots of blood diffusing into the water under the ice cover the screen." Filmtracks wrote "Napoleon is one of the most interestingly unique, albeit brief scores to debut in this genre for many years. That alone earns it some goodwill, but its personality is too split, its discord too great for a recommendation on album."
