= List of The Crown episodes =

The Crown is a historical drama television series about the reign of Queen Elizabeth II. It was created by Peter Morgan and produced by Left Bank Pictures and Sony Pictures Television for Netflix. The first season was released on Netflix on 4 November 2016 with the second season being released on 8 December 2017. The third on 17 November 2019, the fourth on 15 November 2020, the fifth on 9 November 2022, and the sixth between 16 November and 14 December 2023.

During the course of the series, 60 episodes of The Crown were released over six seasons, between 4 November 2016 and 14 December 2023.

== Series overview ==
Season	Episodes		Originally released
1	10		4 November 2016
2	10		8 December 2017
3	10		17 November 2019
4	10		15 November 2020
5	10		9 November 2022
6	10	4	16 November 2023
6	10	6	14 December 2023

== Episodes ==
=== Season 1 (2016) ===
Season one episodes
No. overall	No. in season	Title	Directed by	Written by	Original release date
1	1	"Wolferton Splash"	Stephen Daldry	Peter Morgan	4 November 2016
2	2	"Hyde Park Corner"	Stephen Daldry	Peter Morgan	4 November 2016
3	3	"Windsor"	Philip Martin	Peter Morgan	4 November 2016
4	4	"Act of God"	Julian Jarrold	Peter Morgan	4 November 2016
5	5	"Smoke and Mirrors"	Philip Martin	Peter Morgan	4 November 2016
6	6	"Gelignite"	Julian Jarrold	Peter Morgan	4 November 2016
7	7	"Scientia Potentia Est"	Benjamin Caron	Peter Morgan	4 November 2016
8	8	"Pride & Joy"	Philip Martin	Peter Morgan	4 November 2016
9	9	"Assassins"	Benjamin Caron	Peter Morgan	4 November 2016
10	10	"Gloriana"	Philip Martin	Peter Morgan	4 November 2016

=== Season 2 (2017) ===
No. overall	No. in season	Title	Directed by	Written by	Original release date
11	1	"Misadventure"	Philip Martin	Peter Morgan	8 December 2017
12	2	"A Company of Men"	Philip Martin	Peter Morgan	8 December 2017
13	3	"Lisbon"	Philip Martin	Peter Morgan	8 December 2017
14	4	"Beryl"	Benjamin Caron	Amy Jenkins and Peter Morgan	8 December 2017
15	5	"Marionettes"	Philippa Lowthorpe	Peter Morgan	8 December 2017
16	6	"Vergangenheit"	Philippa Lowthorpe	Peter Morgan	8 December 2017
17	7	"Matrimonium"	Benjamin Caron	Peter Morgan	8 December 2017
18	8	"Dear Mrs Kennedy"	Stephen Daldry	Peter Morgan	8 December 2017
19	9	"Paterfamilias"	Stephen Daldry	Tom Edge and Peter Morgan	8 December 2017
20	10	"Mystery Man"	Benjamin Caron	Peter Morgan	8 December 2017

=== Season 3 (2019) ===
No. overall	No. in season	Title	Directed by	Written by	Original release date
21	1	"Olding"	Benjamin Caron	Peter Morgan	17 November 2019
22	2	"Margaretology"	Benjamin Caron	Peter Morgan	17 November 2019
23	3	"Aberfan"	Benjamin Caron	Peter Morgan	17 November 2019
24	4	"Bubbikins"	Benjamin Caron	Peter Morgan	17 November 2019
25	5	"Coup"	Christian Schwochow	Peter Morgan	17 November 2019
26	6	"Tywysog Cymru"	Christian Schwochow	James Graham & Peter Morgan	17 November 2019
27	7	"Moondust"	Jessica Hobbs	Peter Morgan	17 November 2019
28	8	"Dangling Man"	Sam Donovan	David Hancock & Peter Morgan	17 November 2019
29	9	"Imbroglio"	Sam Donovan	Peter Morgan	17 November 2019
30	10	"Cri de Coeur"	Jessica Hobbs	Peter Morgan	17 November 2019

=== Season 4 (2020) ===
No. overall	No. in season	Title	Directed by	Written by	Original release date
31	1	"Gold Stick"	Benjamin Caron	Peter Morgan	15 November 2020
32	2	"The Balmoral Test"	Paul Whittington	Peter Morgan	15 November 2020
33	3	"Fairytale"	Benjamin Caron	Peter Morgan	15 November 2020
34	4	"Favourites"	Paul Whittington	Peter Morgan	15 November 2020
35	5	"Fagan"	Paul Whittington	Jonathan Wilson and Peter Morgan	15 November 2020
36	6	"Terra Nullius"	Julian Jarrold	Peter Morgan	15 November 2020
37	7	"The Hereditary Principle"	Jessica Hobbs	Peter Morgan	15 November 2020
38	8	"48:1"	Julian Jarrold	Peter Morgan	15 November 2020
39	9	"Avalanche"	Jessica Hobbs	Peter Morgan	15 November 2020
40	10	"War"	Jessica Hobbs	Peter Morgan	15 November 2020

=== Season 5 (2022) ===
No. overall	No. in season	Title	Directed by	Written by	Original release date
41	1	"Queen Victoria Syndrome"	Jessica Hobbs	Peter Morgan	9 November 2022
42	2	"The System"	Jessica Hobbs	Peter Morgan	9 November 2022
43	3	"Mou Mou"	Alex Gabassi	Peter Morgan	9 November 2022
44	4	"Annus Horribilis"	May el-Toukhy	Peter Morgan	9 November 2022
45	5	"The Way Ahead"	May el-Toukhy	Peter Morgan	9 November 2022
46	6	"Ipatiev House"	Christian Schwochow	Peter Morgan	9 November 2022
47	7	"No Woman's Land"	Erik Richter Strand	Peter Morgan	9 November 2022
48	8	"Gunpowder"	Erik Richter Strand	Peter Morgan	9 November 2022
49	9	"Couple 31"	Christian Schwochow	Peter Morgan	9 November 2022
50	10	"Decommissioned"	Alex Gabassi	Peter Morgan	9 November 2022

=== Season 6 (2023) ===
No. overall	No. in season	Title	Directed by	Written by	Original release date
Volume 1
51	1	"Persona Non Grata"	Alex Gabassi	Peter Morgan	16 November 2023
52	2	"Two Photographs"	Christian Schwochow	Peter Morgan	16 November 2023
53	3	"Dis-Moi Oui"	Christian Schwochow	Peter Morgan	16 November 2023
54	4	"Aftermath"	Christian Schwochow	Peter Morgan	16 November 2023
Volume 2
55	5	"Willsmania"	May el-Toukhy	Jonathan Wilson and Peter Morgan	14 December 2023
56	6	"Ruritania"	Erik Richter Strand	Daniel Marc Janes and Peter Morgan	14 December 2023
57	7	"Alma Mater"	May el-Toukhy	Jonathan Wilson and Peter Morgan	14 December 2023
58	8	"Ritz"	Alex Gabassi	Meriel Sheibani-Clare and Peter Morgan	14 December 2023
59	9	"Hope Street"	Erik Richter Strand	Jonathan Wilson and Peter Morgan	14 December 2023
60	10	"Sleep, Dearie Sleep"	Stephen Daldry	Peter Morgan	14 December 2023
