= Marcia Warren =

English actress (born 1943)

- Born: 26 November 1943 (age 82); Watford, Hertfordshire, England
- Occupation: Actress
- Years active: 1970–present

Marcia Warren (born 26 November 1943) is an English stage, film and television actress. On stage, she appeared in Blithe Spirit as Madame Arcati and The Sea (2008) at the Theatre Royal, Haymarket. In 2022 and 2023, she starred as Queen Elizabeth the Queen Mother in seasons 5 and 6 of the Netflix historical drama series The Crown.

She is a two-time Olivier Award winner.

== Early life ==
Warren trained as an actress at Guildhall School of Music and Drama in London, graduating in 1963. From there on she took the path of many of her performing contemporaries, acting in repertory throughout the country, beginning as an assistant stage manager in David Copperfield in Salisbury.

== Career ==
From 1983 to 1986 she played Vera in the BBC sitcom, No Place Like Home. From 2013 to 2016, she played the role of Penelope in the ITV sitcom Vicious and also starred in the 2014 sitcom Edge of Heaven as Nanny Mo. She has also appeared in Keeping Up Appearances, Midsomer Murders and Inside No. 9.

== Awards ==
She has won two Laurence Olivier Theatre Awards for Best Actress in a Supporting Role—one in 1984 for Stepping Out and the other in 2002 for Humble Boy at the Royal National Theatre. She was also nominated for another in 2001 for In Flame at the New Ambassadors Theatre. For her role as Queen Elizabeth The Queen Mother in The Crown, Warren received two nominations for the Screen Actors Guild Award for Outstanding Performance by an Ensemble in a Drama Series.

Year	Award	Category	Nominated work	Result	Ref.
1984	Laurence Olivier Awards	Best Supporting Actress	Stepping Out	Won	
2001	Laurence Olivier Awards	Best Supporting Actress	In Flame	Nominated	
2002	Laurence Olivier Awards	Best Supporting Actress	Humble Boy	Won	
2023	Screen Actors Guild Awards	Outstanding Performance by an Ensemble in a Drama Series	The Crown	Nominated	
2024	Screen Actors Guild Awards	Outstanding Performance by an Ensemble in a Drama Series	The Crown	Nominated	

== Filmography ==
Film

Year	Title	Role	Notes
1986	Mr. Love	Doris Lovelace	
1994	Don't Get Me Started	Pauline Lewis	
2004	Gladiatress	Queen Tuathfhlaifthfth	
2005	Mrs. Palfrey at the Claremont	Vera Post	
2005	The Jealous God	Mrs Dungarvan	
2006	Housewife, 49	Mrs Lord	Television film
2011	Hattie	Esma Cannon	Television film
2012	Run for Your Wife	Woman on seat	
2016	Absolutely Fabulous: The Movie	Lubliana	

Television

Year	Title	Role	Notes
1972	Public Eye	Waitress	"Girl in Blue"
1983–1986	No Place Like Home	Vera Botting	sitcom
1986	We'll Think of Something	Maureen Brooks	ITV sitcom
1986	I Woke Up One Morning	Doris	BBC sitcom
1991	Miss Pym's Day Out	Dora Caldicote	
1991	The Diamond Brothers: South by South East	Mrs Jackson	CITV mini-series
1992	Keeping Up Appearances	Bunty	sitcom
1995	Searching	Chancy's Mum	sitcom
1996–1998	Dangerfield	Angela Wakefield	drama
2000	Coronation Street	Gladys Braithwaite	guest role
2003–2004	My Dad's the Prime Minister	Granny Philips	sitcom
2006	Housewife, 49	Mrs Lord	
2006, 2008	Jam & Jerusalem	Lady Anne Crump	sitcom
2007	Midsomer Murders	Melissa Shrike	“Death in a Chocolate Box” (Series 10, Episode 8)
2008	Consuming Passion: 100 Years of Mills & Boon	Elsie	BBC Four drama
2008	The Long Walk to Finchley	Old Dear	BBC Four drama
2009	Victoria Wood's Midlife Christmas	Arnica	
2011	The Café	Alice Dobson	Sky1
2013–2016	Vicious	Penelope	ITV sitcom
2014	Father Brown	Miss Audrey Diggle	"The Pride of the Prydes" Episode 2.3
2014	Edge of Heaven	Nanny Mo	ITV sitcom
2014	Agatha Raisin and the Quiche of Death	Mrs Boggle	Sky1
2015	Crackanory	Dolly Coblington	Series 3, Episode 6
2017	Sherlock	Vivian Norbury	"The Six Thatchers" (Series 4, Episode 1)
2017	Josh	Violet	Series 3, Episode 4
2018	Inside No. 9	Alice	"Zanzibar" (Series 4, Episode 1)
2019	Don't Forget the Driver	Joy	Series 1
2019	Not Going Out	Mrs Hoskins	Halloween Special (Series 10, Episode 8)
2019	Midsomer Murders	Belinda Braun	“The Causton Lions” (Series 20, Episode 4)
2022–2023	The Crown	Queen Elizabeth the Queen Mother	Main role (Seasons 5–6)
2023	Beyond Paradise	Floella	Episode 5
2026	Alice and Steve	Val	

Video games

Year	Title	Role	Notes
2003	Tomb Raider: The Angel of Darkness	Margot Carvier (voice only)	
2014	Dark Souls II	Morrel/Merchant Hag Melentia (voice only)	
