= Meg Bellamy =

English actress (born 2002)

- Born: Megan Kate Smith; 9 October 2002 (age 23); Leeds, England
- Years active: 2021–present

Megan Kate Smith (born 9 October 2002), known professionally as Meg Bellamy, is an English actress. She is known for her role as Catherine Middleton in the sixth season of The Crown (2023).

== Early life ==
Bellamy was born in Leeds, Yorkshire; her family moved to Wokingham, Berkshire, when she was five. Her mother enrolled her in local Stagecoach acting classes from a young age. Bellamy attended St Crispin's School, where she served as head girl and took part in the performing arts, including productions of Grease and Matilda.

== Career ==
In September 2022, it was announced Bellamy would make her professional acting debut portraying a young Catherine Middleton opposite Ed McVey as Prince William in the sixth and final season of the Netflix biographical series The Crown. Bellamy discovered the casting call through social media, auditioned shortly after completing her A Levels, and learned she had been cast while working as a mascot at Legoland. First look images of Bellamy and McVey in costume were revealed in March 2023, and the season was released later that year in November.

In 2024, Bellamy made her professional stage debut as Jean Purdy in A Child of Science, a play about the creation of IVF, at the Bristol Old Vic with Tom Felton and Adelle Leonce.

== Filmography ==
=== Film ===
Year	Title	Role	Notes
2021	The Prince of Savile Row	Janice	Short film

=== Television ===
Year	Title	Role	Notes
2023	The Crown	Kate Middleton	3 episodes (season 6)
2026	Up to No Good		

=== Theatre ===
Year	Title	Role	Director	Playwright	Theatre
2024	A Child of Science	Jean Purdy	Matthew Dunster	Gareth Farr	Bristol Old Vic
