= Luther Ford =

British actor

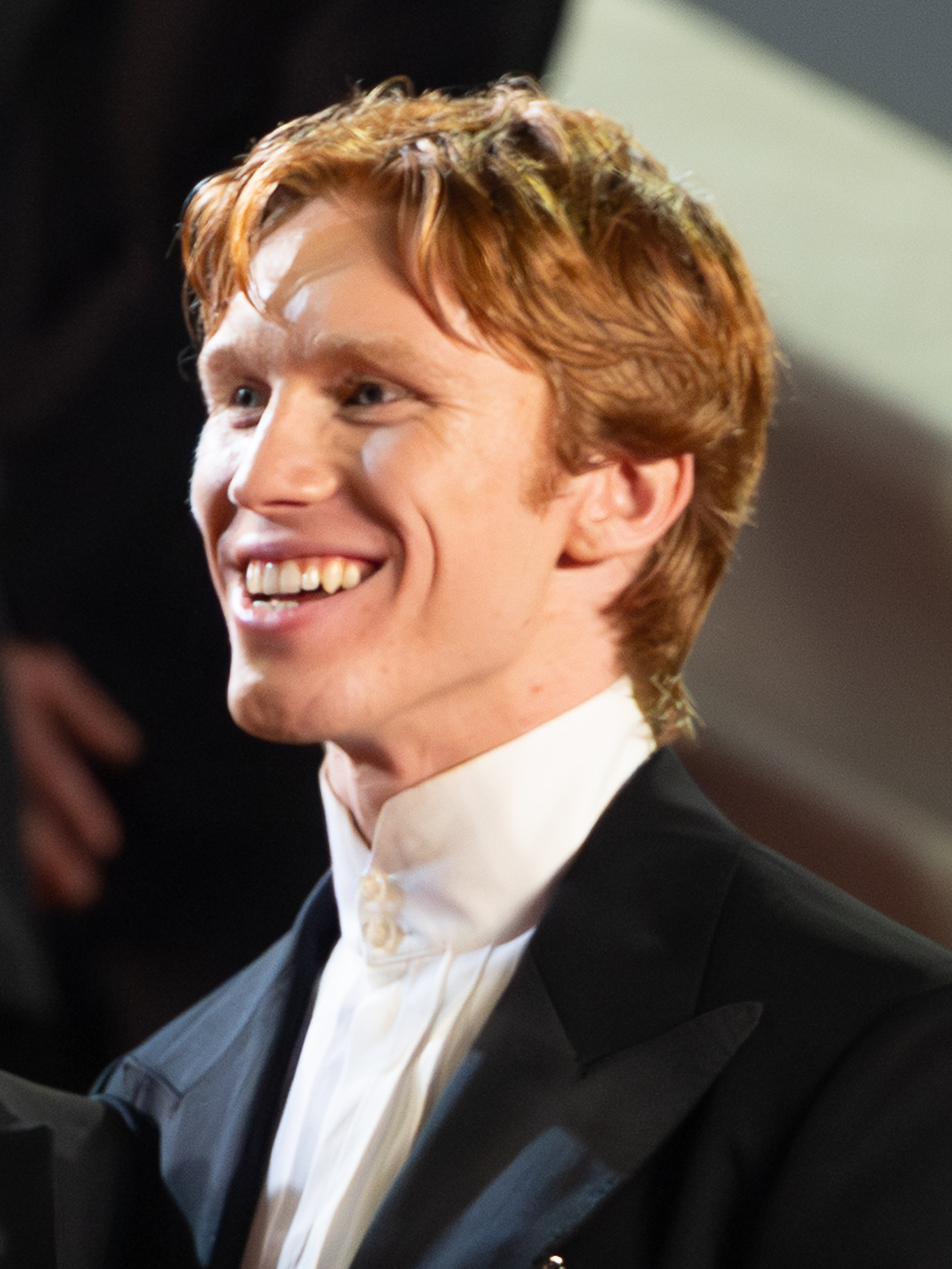
- Ford at the 2026 Cannes Film Festival
- Born: 2000 (age 25–26)
- Education: Arts University Bournemouth
- Occupations: Actor, director
- Years active: 2020–present
- Television: The Crown

Luther Ford (born 2000) is a British actor. He played a young Prince Harry in the Netflix series The Crown and Tostig Godwinson in the BBC series King & Conqueror.

== Early life and education ==
Ford was born and raised in London. He attended an all-boys' state school.

He has called himself "a bit of a strange teenager", and was not allowed to watch TV or films growing up, and did not own a mobile phone for most of his adolescence. Because of this, he and his best friend would spend their weekends making films in places such as Hampstead Heath, in an effort to try and escape London. Many of these films would include one-take choreographed battle scenes.

Ford attended film school to study film production in Bournemouth. He spent two years having to attend his lectures via Zoom due to the COVID-19 pandemic. He originally intended to become a filmmaker.

He co-wrote, co-directed and starred in, with Eleni Ordans, the short film Dream Between in 2020, when the two of them were the only students living on campus during lockdown for the COVID-19 pandemic. Following that, he also made the short film Woods, with Ordans starring.

== Career ==
Ford played a young Prince Harry on series six of the Netflix series The Crown. He was still a film production student at the time of the open casting, and he applied for the role after a message about the audition was sent to him on the family WhatsApp. He had six auditions before being confirmed in the role. He told The New York Times that he listened to the audiobook of Harry's autobiography Spare during production to help him get an essence of his voice.

In March 2024, Ford was added to the cast of Netflix spy thriller series Black Doves, which also features Keira Knightley and Ben Whishaw. That month, he was also cast as Tostig Godwinson in the BBC One historical epic series King & Conqueror. He would also walk the runway for Miu Miu during Paris Fashion Week that same month.

He would model for Burberry's Winter campaign, "A Grand Escape", in September 2025.

Ford stars in the second series of the Apple TV crime thriller Criminal Record, which premiered on 22 April 2026. He also played the role of Vincent in Ira Sachs' 2026 film The Man I Love which premiered at the 79th Cannes Film Festival on 20 May 2026.

== Personal life ==
Ford is from North London.

He has kept a low-profile despite his success, with little being known about his personal life. When interviewed in October 2025 by the magazine Man About Town, he would say; "I try not to represent myself too visibly."

== Filmography ==
Key
†	Denotes works that have not yet been released

Year	Title	Role	Notes
2023	The Crown	Prince Harry	Series 6
2024	Black Doves	Hector Newman	Recurring
2025	King & Conqueror	Tostig	Main cast
2026	Criminal Record	Billy Fielding	Series 2
2026	The Man I Love	Vincent	
TBA	Army of Shadows †		Upcoming series
