= An Intervention =

2014 play

An Intervention is a 2014 play by the British playwright Mike Bartlett. It premiered at the Watford Palace Theatre (in a co-production with Paines Plough) in April, 2014, was directed by James Grieve and featured Rachael Stirling and John Hollingworth.
