= Salim Daw =

Palestinian actor (born 1950)

- سليم ضو
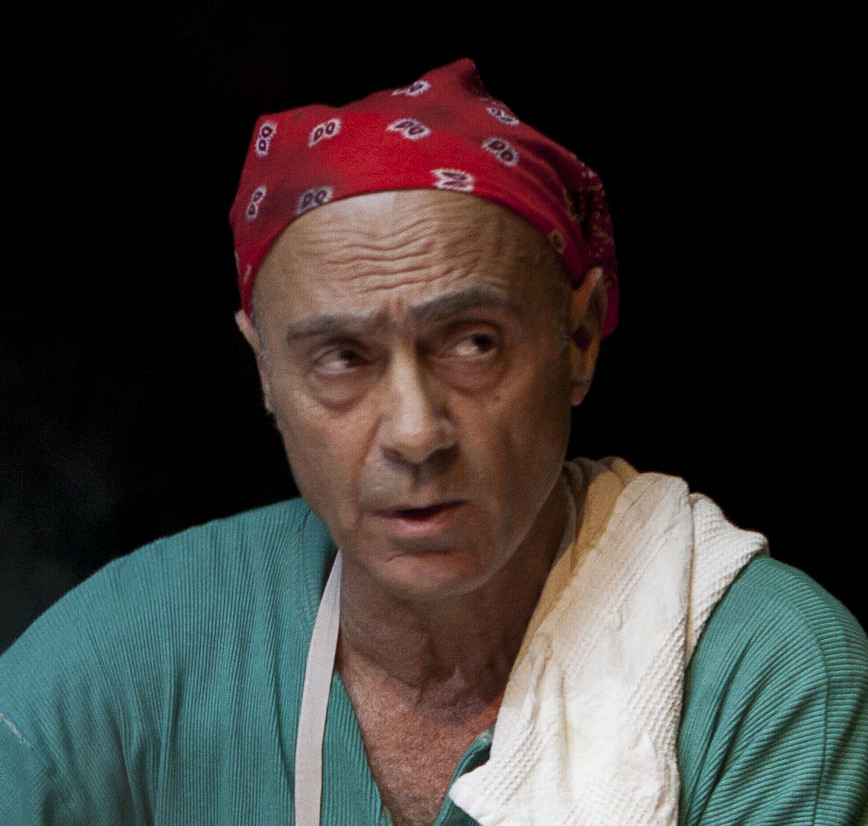
- Daw onstage at Haifa Theatre in 2011
- Born: 1 September 1950 (age 76); Bi'ina, Israel
- Education: Beit Zvi School for the Performing Arts; L'École Internationale de Théâtre Jacques Lecoq
- Occupation: Actor

Salim Daw (also spelled Salim Dau, Arabic: سليم ضو; born 1 September 1950) is a Arab-Israeli actor. With appearances in more than 60 works of stage, television and film, he is perhaps best known for portraying Mohamed Al-Fayed on seasons 5 and 6 of Netflix's The Crown.

== Early life and education ==
Daw was born in Bi'ina, a Palestinian village in Israel in 1950; he is a Palestinian citizen of Israel.

As a young child, his father's friends would often ask him to entertain them with impressions. “I was an expert even at five, and the funny thing was that they used to reward me with fruits, sweets, and a little money," he told Al-Ahram in 2021. "So being an actor was the thing for me at a very early stage in my life."

In 1972, Daw enrolled at the Beit Zvi School for the Performing Arts in Ramat Gan. He went on to study at the École Internationale de Théâtre Jacques Lecoq in Paris, graduating in 1979.

== Career ==
Daw had a recurring role as Sheikh Awadalla in the 2015 Israeli political TV drama Fauda. He starred as Issa in the 2020 international drama film Gaza mon amour.

In 2021, Daw was cast as the Egyptian billionaire and Harrods owner Mohamed Al-Fayed for The Crown's fifth season. The role earned him a 2023 BAFTA nomination for Best Supporting Actor. He also played Tarek, the protagonist's father, in the Palestinian film Let It Be Morning, and PLO minister Ahmed Qurei in HBO's adaptation of the play Oslo.

Daw reprised the role of Al-Fayed in The Crown's sixth season. He expressed "deep sadness" and a connection to Al-Fayed upon the businessman's 2023 death.

== Personal life ==
Daw lives in Haifa with his wife.

He has 4 daughters. One of them, Maysa Daw, is a musician and member of the influential rap group DAM.

== Awards and nominations ==
Year	Awards	Category	Project	Result	Ref.
2023	BAFTA Television Awards	Best Supporting Actor	The Crown	Nominated	
2024	Screen Actors Guild Awards	Outstanding Performance by an Ensemble in a Drama Series	The Crown	Nominated	
2024	BAFTA Television Awards	Best Supporting Actor	The Crown	Nominated	
