= The Crown (TV series) =

British historical drama television series (2016–2023)

- Genre: Historical drama
- Created by: Peter Morgan
- Starring: Seasons 1–2: Claire Foy; Matt Smith; Vanessa Kirby; Eileen Atkins; Jeremy Northam; Victoria Hamilton; Ben Miles; Greg Wise; Jared Harris; John Lithgow; Alex Jennings; Lia Williams; Anton Lesser; Matthew Goode; Seasons 3–4: Olivia Colman; Tobias Menzies; Helena Bonham Carter; Ben Daniels; Jason Watkins; Marion Bailey; Erin Doherty; Charles Dance; Josh O'Connor; Emma Corrin; Gillian Anderson; Stephen Boxer; Emerald Fennell; Seasons 5–6: Imelda Staunton; Jonathan Pryce; Lesley Manville; Dominic West; Elizabeth Debicki; Jonny Lee Miller; Olivia Williams; Claudia Harrison; Natascha McElhone; Marcia Warren; Salim Daw; Khalid Abdalla; Bertie Carvel; Ed McVey; Luther Ford; Meg Bellamy
- Theme music composer: Hans Zimmer
- Composers: Rupert Gregson-Williams (s. 1–2); Lorne Balfe (s. 2); Martin Phipps (s. 3–6)
- Countries of origin: United Kingdom; United States
- Original language: English
- No. of seasons: 6
- No. of episodes: 60 (list of episodes)

Production
- Executive producers: Peter Morgan; Stephen Daldry; Andy Harries; Philip Martin; Suzanne Mackie; Matthew Byam Shaw; Robert Fox; Tanya Seghatchian; Nina Wolarsky; Allie Goss; Benjamin Caron
- Producers: Andy Stebbing; Martin Harrison; Michael Casey; Andrew Eaton; Oona O'Beirn; Faye Ward
- Production location: United Kingdom
- Running time: 39–72 minutes
- Production companies: Sony Pictures Television; Left Bank Pictures

Original release
- Network: Netflix
- Release: 4 November 2016 – 14 December 2023

The Crown is a historical drama television series about the reign of Queen Elizabeth II, created and principally written by Peter Morgan and produced by Left Bank Pictures and Sony Pictures Television for Netflix. Morgan developed the series from his film The Queen (2006) and his stage play The Audience (2013), which also focused on Elizabeth.

The series consists of six seasons spanning almost six decades, beginning shortly before the wedding of Princess Elizabeth and Philip Mountbatten in 1947 and ending with the 2005 wedding of Prince Charles and Camilla Parker Bowles. The principal cast of the series has been changed every two seasons; Elizabeth was played by Claire Foy in the first and second seasons, Olivia Colman in the third and fourth, and Imelda Staunton in the fifth and sixth.

Filming took place at Elstree Studios in Borehamwood, Hertfordshire, with location shooting taking place in the United Kingdom and internationally. Netflix released the first season on 4 November 2016; the sixth was released in two parts, the first on 16 November 2023 and the second on 14 December 2023.

The Crown has been praised by critics for its acting, directing, writing, cinematography, and production value. However, its historical inaccuracies have been criticised, particularly in the latter half of the series's run. The series has won numerous awards, including a Primetime Emmy Award for Outstanding Drama Series and two Golden Globe Awards for Best Television Series-Drama.

== Plot ==
The Crown portrays the life of Queen Elizabeth II from her wedding in 1947 to Philip Mountbatten, until the early 21st century:

- The first season covers 1947 to 1955, including Elizabeth's accession and coronation after the death of George VI, Winston Churchill resigning as prime minister and the Queen's sister Princess Margaret's relationship with Peter Townsend.
- The second season covers 1956 to 1964, including the Suez Crisis, the tenures of Anthony Eden and Harold Macmillan as prime minister, the Profumo affair, and the births of Prince Andrew and Prince Edward.
- The third season covers 1964 to 1977, including Harold Wilson and Edward Heath's terms as prime minister, the Aberfan disaster, the introduction of Camilla Shand, and the Queen's Silver Jubilee.
- The fourth season covers 1979 to 1990, including Margaret Thatcher's tenure as prime minister and the courtship and marriage of Prince Charles to Lady Diana Spencer.
- The fifth season covers 1991 to 1997, including John Major's tenure as prime minister, the divorce of Charles and Diana, the rise of the Al-Fayed family and the Queen's "annus horribilis" of 1992.
- The sixth and final season covers 1997 to 2005, during the premiership of Tony Blair. The first four episodes cover the death of Diana, and the final six, the Queen's Golden Jubilee, the deaths of Princess Margaret and the Queen Mother, the early relationship of Prince William and Catherine Middleton and the wedding of Prince Charles and Camilla Parker Bowles.

== Episodes ==
| Season | Episodes | | Originally released |
|---|---|---|---|
| 1 | 10 | | 4 November 2016 |
| 2 | 10 | | 8 December 2017 |
| 3 | 10 | | 17 November 2019 |
| 4 | 10 | | 15 November 2020 |
| 5 | 10 | | 9 November 2022 |
| 6 | 10 | 4 | 16 November 2023 |
| 6 | 10 | 6 | 14 December 2023 |

== Cast and characters ==
=== Main ===
- Claire Foy (seasons 1–2, featured seasons 4 and 6, guest season 5), Olivia Colman (seasons 3–4, featured season 6), and Imelda Staunton (seasons 5–6) as Queen Elizabeth II
- Matt Smith (seasons 1–2), Tobias Menzies (seasons 3–4), and Jonathan Pryce (seasons 5–6) as Prince Philip, Duke of Edinburgh
- Vanessa Kirby (seasons 1–2), Helena Bonham Carter (seasons 3–4), and Lesley Manville (seasons 5–6) as Princess Margaret, Countess of Snowdon
- Eileen Atkins (season 1) as Queen Mary
- Jeremy Northam as Anthony Eden (seasons 1–2)
- Victoria Hamilton (seasons 1–2), Marion Bailey (seasons 3–4), and Marcia Warren (seasons 5–6) as Queen Elizabeth the Queen Mother
- Ben Miles (season 1, featured season 2, guest season 5) and Timothy Dalton (featured season 5) as Group Captain Peter Townsend
- Greg Wise (seasons 1–2) and Charles Dance (season 3, featured season 4) as Louis Mountbatten, 1st Earl Mountbatten of Burma
- Jared Harris as King George VI (season 1, featured season 2)
- John Lithgow as Winston Churchill (season 1, featured seasons 2–3)
- Alex Jennings (season 1, featured seasons 2 and 5) and Derek Jacobi (featured season 3) as Prince Edward, Duke of Windsor
- Lia Williams (season 1, featured seasons 2 and 5) and Geraldine Chaplin (featured season 3) as Wallis, Duchess of Windsor
- Anton Lesser as Harold Macmillan (season 2)
- Matthew Goode (season 2) and Ben Daniels (season 3) as Antony Armstrong-Jones, 1st Earl of Snowdon
- Jason Watkins as Harold Wilson (season 3)
- Erin Doherty (seasons 3–4) and Claudia Harrison (seasons 5–6) as Anne, Princess Royal
- Josh O'Connor (seasons 3–4) and Dominic West (seasons 5–6) as Charles, Prince of Wales
- Emma Corrin (season 4) and Elizabeth Debicki (seasons 5–6) as Diana, Princess of Wales
- Gillian Anderson as Margaret Thatcher (season 4)
- Stephen Boxer as Denis Thatcher (season 4)
- Emerald Fennell (season 4, featured season 3) and Olivia Williams (seasons 5–6) as Camilla Parker Bowles
- Jonny Lee Miller (season 5) as John Major
- Natascha McElhone (season 5) as Penelope "Penny" Knatchbull, Lady Romsey
- Bertie Carvel (season 6, featured season 5) as Tony Blair
- Salim Daw (season 6, featured season 5) as Mohamed Al-Fayed
- Khalid Abdalla (season 6, featured season 5) as Dodi Fayed
- Ed McVey (season 6) as Prince William of Wales
- Luther Ford (season 6) as Prince Henry of Wales
- Meg Bellamy (season 6) as Catherine Middleton

=== Featured ===
The following actors are credited in the opening titles of up to two episodes in a season:

- Stephen Dillane as Graham Sutherland, a noted artist who paints a portrait of the ageing Churchill (season 1)
- Gemma Whelan as Patricia Campbell, a secretary who works with Lord Altrincham and types up his editorial (season 2)
- John Heffernan as Lord Altrincham, a writer who penned a scathing criticism of Elizabeth II (season 2)
- Paul Sparks as Billy Graham, a prominent American preacher whom Elizabeth consults (season 2)
- Michael C. Hall as John F. Kennedy, the president of the United States who visits Elizabeth (season 2)
- Jodi Balfour as Jacqueline Kennedy, the first lady of the United States who visits Elizabeth (season 2)
- Burghart Klaußner as Dr Kurt Hahn, the founder of Gordonstoun, where Philip and Charles went to school (season 2)
- Finn Elliot as school-aged Prince Philip (season 2, guest season 3)
- Julian Baring as school-aged Prince Charles (season 2)
- Clancy Brown as Lyndon B. Johnson, the president of the United States following Kennedy (season 3)
- Jane Lapotaire (season 3), Rosalind Knight (recurring season 1) and Sophie Leigh Stone (recurring season 2) as Alice, Princess Andrew of Greece and Denmark, Philip's mother
- Mark Lewis Jones as Edward Millward, Prince Charles's Welsh language tutor (season 3)
- Tim McMullan as Robin Woods, the Dean of Windsor (season 3)
- Michael Maloney as Edward Heath (season 3)
- Andrew Buchan (season 3, recurring season 4) and Daniel Flynn (guest season 5) as Andrew Parker Bowles, Camilla's first husband
- Harry Treadaway as Roddy Llewellyn, Princess Margaret's boyfriend (season 3, guest season 4)
- Tom Brooke as Michael Fagan, a man who enters the Queen's bedroom in 1982 (season 4)
- Richard Roxburgh as Bob Hawke, the prime minister of Australia (season 4)
- Tom Burke as Derek "Dazzle" Jennings, a civil servant and friend of Princess Margaret (season 4)
- Nicholas Farrell as Michael Shea, Elizabeth's press secretary (season 4)
- Prasanna Puwanarajah as Martin Bashir, the journalist who conducted "An Interview with HRH The Princess of Wales" (season 5)
- Eve Best as Carole Middleton, mother of Catherine Middleton (season 6)
- Viola Prettejohn as teenage Princess Elizabeth (season 6)
- Beau Gadsdon as teenage Princess Margaret (season 6, recurring season 1, guest season 3)

== Production ==
=== Development ===
In November 2014, it was announced that Netflix was to adapt the 2013 stage play The Audience into a television series. Peter Morgan, who wrote the 2006 film The Queen and the play, is the main scriptwriter for The Crown. The directors of the first season are Stephen Daldry, Philip Martin, Julian Jarrold, and Benjamin Caron. The first 10-part season was the most expensive drama produced by Netflix and Left Bank Pictures, costing at least £100 million. A second season was commissioned, with the series intended to span 60 episodes over six seasons. By October 2017, "early production" had begun on an anticipated third and fourth season. By the following January, Netflix confirmed the series had been renewed for third and fourth seasons.

In January 2020, Morgan announced that the series had been renewed for a fifth and final season. Speaking to ending the series with five seasons, after it had been intended to last six, Morgan said while crafting the stories for season five, "it has become clear to me that this is the perfect time and place to stop"; Netflix and Sony supported Morgan's decision. However, in July 2020, Netflix announced that the series would receive a sixth season as originally intended. Morgan said that when the storylines were being discussed for season five, "it soon became clear that in order to do justice to the richness and complexity of the story we should go back to the original plan and do six seasons". He added that the final two seasons would enable them "to cover the same period in greater detail". As of 2020, the estimated production budget of The Crown has been reported to be $260 million, making it one of the most expensive television series ever.

=== Casting ===
By November 2014, Claire Foy had entered negotiations to portray Queen Elizabeth II. By May 2015, Vanessa Kirby was in negotiations to portray Princess Margaret. In June 2015, John Lithgow was cast as Winston Churchill, Matt Smith was cast as Prince Philip, and Foy was confirmed as Queen Elizabeth II. Victoria Hamilton, Jared Harris, and Eileen Atkins were also starring in the first season. Foy reprised her role as the young Queen in cameos in seasons 4, 5 and 6. For her appearance in "48:1", the eighth episode of season 4, Foy won an Emmy.

The producers recast the continuing roles with older actors every two seasons as the timeline moves forward. In October 2017, Olivia Colman was cast as Queen Elizabeth II for the third and fourth seasons. By January 2018, Helena Bonham Carter and Paul Bettany were in negotiations to portray Princess Margaret and Prince Philip, respectively, for these seasons. However, by the end of the month, Bettany was forced to drop out due to the time commitment required. By the end of March 2018, Tobias Menzies was cast as Prince Philip for the third and fourth seasons. In early May 2018, Bonham Carter was confirmed to have been cast alongside Jason Watkins as Prime Minister Harold Wilson. The next month, Ben Daniels was cast as Tony Armstrong-Jones for the third season, along with Erin Doherty joining the series as Princess Anne. A month later, Josh O'Connor and Marion Bailey were cast as Prince Charles and the Queen Mother, respectively, for the third and fourth seasons. In October 2018, Emerald Fennell was cast as Camilla Shand. In December 2018, Charles Dance was cast as Louis Mountbatten. In April 2019, Emma Corrin was cast as Lady Diana Spencer for the fourth season. Gillian Anderson, who had been rumoured since January 2019 to be in talks to portray Margaret Thatcher in the fourth season, was officially confirmed for the role in September 2019.

In January 2020, Imelda Staunton was announced as succeeding Colman as the Queen in the fifth season, with her role in the final season reported in July. Also in July 2020, Lesley Manville was announced as portraying Princess Margaret, and the following month, Jonathan Pryce and Elizabeth Debicki were cast as Prince Philip and Diana, Princess of Wales, respectively. In October 2020, Dominic West was in talks to play Prince Charles. His casting was confirmed in April 2021, when the start date for production of the fifth season was announced. In June 2021, Jonny Lee Miller was cast as John Major. During the same month, Olivia Williams confirmed during an interview that she had joined the cast as Camilla Parker Bowles for the series's fifth and sixth seasons. In July 2021, actress Marcia Warren joined the cast during filming as Queen Elizabeth the Queen Mother. That same month, the casting of Claudia Harrison as Princess Anne was also confirmed. In September 2021, Khalid Abdalla and Salim Daw were announced to play Dodi Fayed and Mohamed Al-Fayed, respectively. Later that month, it was confirmed that Timothy Dalton had been cast as Peter Townsend. In January 2022, Humayun Saeed was cast as Dr Hasnat Khan.

A casting search for actors to play teenage Prince William and Prince Harry in the sixth season began in March 2022. The new actor for Prince William would replace Senan West, who was cast as a young Prince William for season five, with the other new castings for the fifth season expected to remain for the sixth season.

In September 2022, it was announced that Rufus Kampa and Ed McVey would portray Prince William, and Meg Bellamy would portray Catherine Middleton.

==== Gender pay gap controversy ====
The Left Bank producers stated that Smith was paid more than Foy for the first two seasons, partly because of his Doctor Who fame. This led to a gender pay gap controversy, including the creation of a petition asking Smith to donate the difference between his and Foy's salary to the Time's Up Legal Defense Fund. Left Bank later apologised to Foy and Smith and said that they had been at the centre of a media storm "through no fault of their own", adding that they "are responsible for budgets and salaries; the actors are not aware of who gets what, and cannot be held personally responsible for the pay of their colleagues". They added that they support "the drive for gender equality in film and TV and [were] eager to talk to the British Time's Up campaign and [were] already speaking to Era 50:50, a group campaigning for gender equality on screen and stage". Suzanne Mackie, Left Bank's creative director, did note that in the future, no actor would be paid more than the actress portraying the Queen.

Regarding the controversy, Foy was "not surprised" that it became a big story, "in the sense that it was a female-led drama". Smith noted that he supported Foy and was "pleased that it was resolved and [the producers] made amends for it because that's what needed to happen". The Hollywood Reporter noted it was unclear what Smith was referring to as resolved since Netflix and Left Bank had not commented further. Foy later described reports that she had received backpay to bring her salary up to parity as "not quite correct".

=== Filming ===
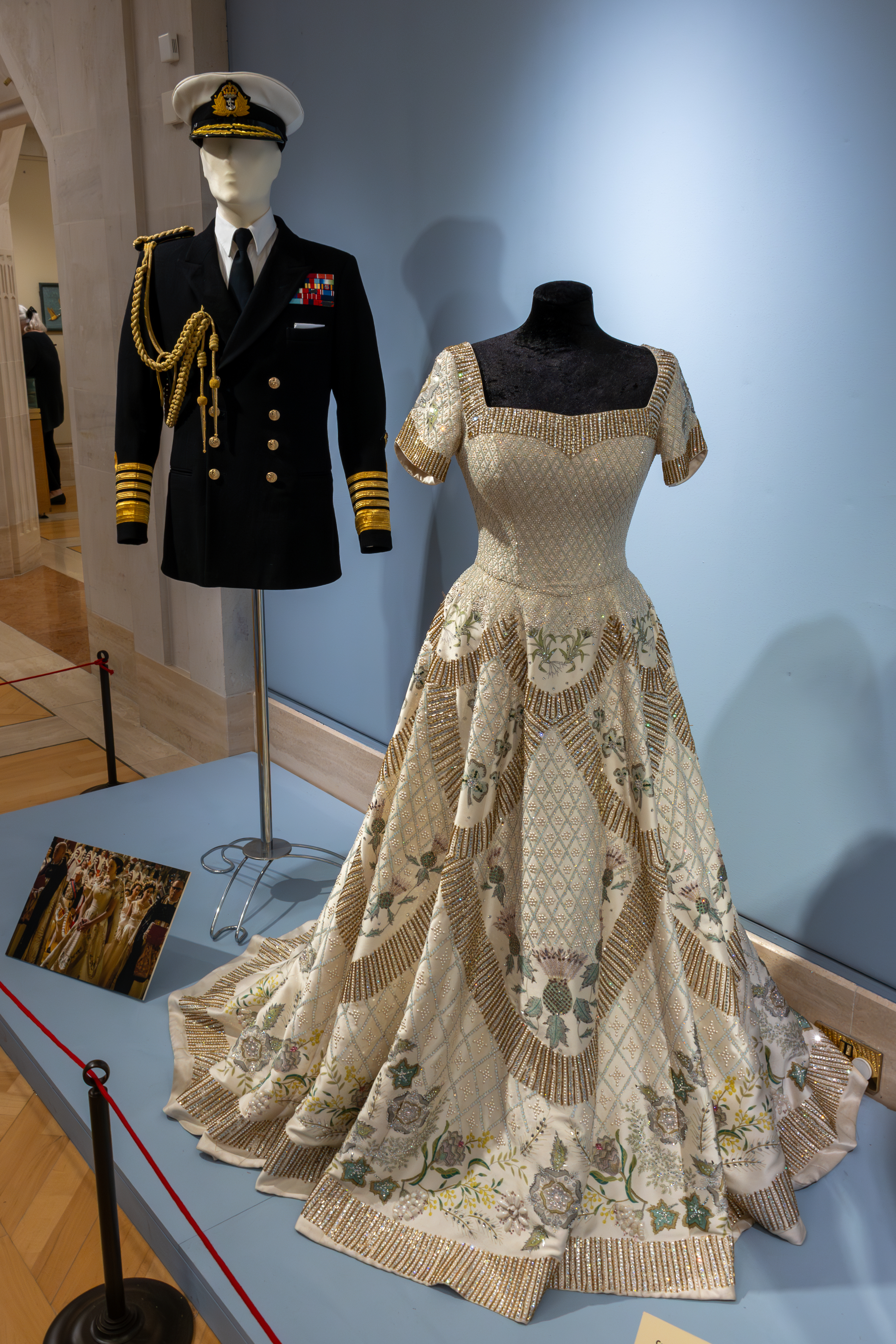
Replica coronation gown of Elizabeth II and wedding suit of Prince Philip used in the series.

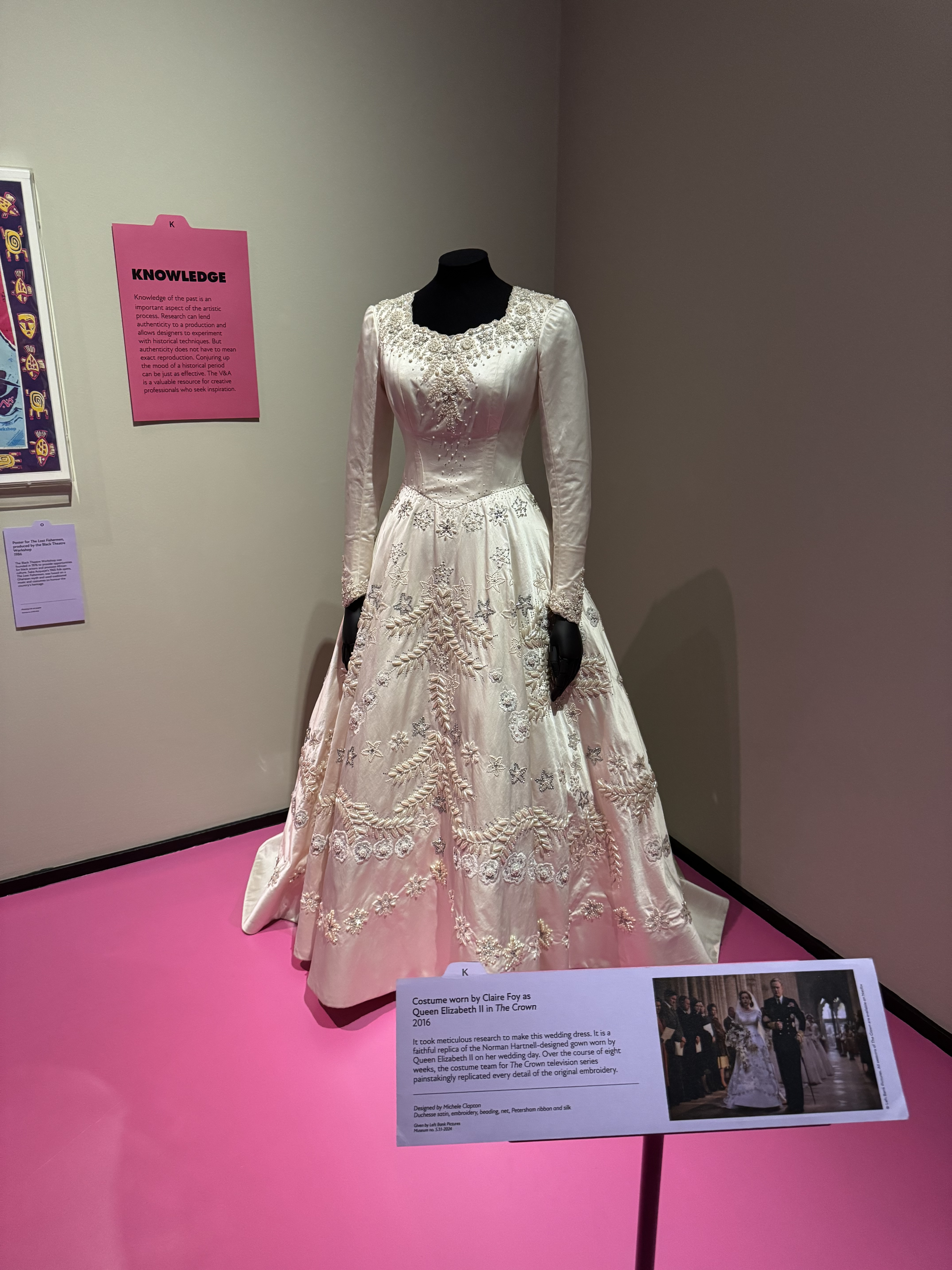
Replica wedding gown, worn by Claire Foy, in exhibition at the V&A museum (June 2025).

An estimated 25% of the first season was filmed at Elstree Studios in Borehamwood, Hertfordshire, with the remainder filmed on location, altogether taking 152 days. Sets for private quarters, the interior of a private jet, the cabinet room, and the exterior of 10 Downing Street were built at Elstree Studios. At the same time, Lancaster House, Wrotham Park, and Wilton House were used to double as Buckingham Palace. Ely Cathedral and Winchester Cathedral stood in for Westminster Abbey, while locations in South Africa doubled as Kenya. Additional locations in the UK included Belvoir Castle, Waddesdon Manor, Eltham Palace, the Royal Naval College, Goldsmiths' Hall, Shoreham Airport, New Slains Castle, Balmoral Castle, Cruden Bay, Lyceum Theatre, Loseley Park, Hatfield House, The Historic Dockyard Chatham, Southwark Cathedral, Ardverikie House, Englefield House, Wellington College, the Great Central Railway and the Glenfeshie Estate.

Filming for the second season began in early October 2016. Each episode of the first two seasons would shoot for about 22 days with each costing about £5 million to produce. The third season began filming in July 2018 and concluded in February 2019. The fourth season began filming in August 2019 and wrapped in March 2020. Shooting locations used to double foreign settings included Manchester (as New York City), Málaga and Almería (as Sydney and other Australian settings), as well as Atlanterra, Cádiz (as Mustique).

The filming of the fifth season began in July 2021. The year break in filming between the end of season four and the start of season five was built into the series's production schedule. It was not related to the COVID-19 pandemic. On 16 February 2022, items previously used in the series's production worth £150,000 were stolen from three vehicles, most of which were described as having "limited value for resale" but "are valuable as pieces to the UK film industry". Locations featured in series five included Cobham Hall, which doubled as Eton College, and the Historic Dockyard at Chatham, both in Kent. Filming for the sixth season began in August 2022, but Morgan noted he expected it to stop for a period of time in September following the death of Elizabeth II "out of respect". In October 2022, it was reported that the events just before and right after the death of Diana, Princess of Wales in Paris would be filmed for season six.

=== Historical accuracy ===
The series has been criticised for its depiction of historical events, particularly from the fourth season onwards. The programme's historical consultant, Robert Lacey, has stated that "there are two sorts of truth. There's historical truth, and then there's the larger truth about the past" and that "when history gets departed from, it's not done casually. It's done on the basis of wanting to convey a particular message that can only be conveyed by invention." An example of such a departure is the season one plot in which the Queen and the government oppose Princess Margaret's desire to marry Peter Townsend, which would have required the monarch's permission under the Royal Marriages Act 1772; in reality, a plan was made to amend the Act to allow the marriage while removing Margaret and her children from the line of succession. The third season was criticised for omitting any mention of Rhodesia and the crisis about their Unilateral Declaration of Independence.

The fourth season was criticised in the UK press as "inaccurate" and "anti-monarchy". It was described as "fake history" by Simon Jenkins in The Guardian, and the royal biographer Sally Bedell Smith stated that "because The Crown is such a lavish and expensive production, so beautifully acted and cleverly written, and so much attention has been paid to visual details about historical events, viewers are tricked into believing that what they are seeing actually happened". The British culture secretary, Oliver Dowden, and the actress Judi Dench both suggested that the series should have a fiction warning at the beginning as a disclaimer, with Dench arguing that the show could mislead non-British audiences with its use of dramatic licence. In October 2022, Netflix added a disclaimer to the series's title synopsis page on its website and to the YouTube description of the trailer for season five, which describes it as a "fictional dramatisation" that was "inspired by real events".

The accuracy of the series has been criticised by some of the individuals and institutions portrayed. Gordonstoun School responded to its negative portrayal by claiming that Prince Charles's personal feedback to the school had been overwhelmingly positive. Michael Fagan, whose intrusion into the Queen's bedroom while she slept is depicted in season four, has said that his conversation with the Queen was "short, polite and non-controversial", and that he never spoke about Margaret Thatcher as he is shown doing in the series. The former prime ministers John Major and Tony Blair publicly criticised the series; Blair's spokesman described the first episode of season five, where in 1991, Prince Charles is portrayed attempting to recruit John Major and Tony Blair to support the Queen's abdication in favour of him, as "complete and utter rubbish". Major stated that no such conversation took place and that the scene was "a barrel-load of malicious nonsense". Conversely, during a 2021 appearance on The Late Late Show with James Corden, Prince Harry stated that he was comfortable with The Crown's portrayal of the royal family, noting that, while as a work of fiction, it is "not strictly accurate", it does give a "rough idea" of the pressures of "putting duty and service above family and everything else".

== Release ==
The series's first two episodes were released in the United Kingdom on 1 November 2016. The first season was released worldwide on 4 November 2016. The second season was released on 8 December 2017. The third season was released on 17 November 2019. The fourth season was released on 15 November 2020. The fifth season was released on 9 November 2022. The sixth and final season was released in two parts: the first on 16 November 2023 and the second on 14 December 2023.

The first season was released on DVD and Blu-ray in the United Kingdom on 16 October 2017 and worldwide on 7 November. The second season was released on DVD and Blu-ray in the United Kingdom on 22 October 2018 and worldwide on 13 November 2018. The third season was released on DVD and Blu-ray in the United Kingdom on 2 November 2020 and worldwide the following day. The fourth season was released on DVD and Blu-ray in the United Kingdom on 1 November 2021 and worldwide the following day. The fifth season was released on DVD and Blu-ray in the United Kingdom on 16 October 2023 and worldwide the following day. The sixth season was released on DVD and Blu-ray in the United Kingdom on 16 September 2024 and worldwide the following day.

== Reception ==
=== Critical response ===
Critical response of The Crown
| Season | Rotten Tomatoes | Metacritic |
|---|---|---|
| 1 | 88% (77 reviews) | 81 (29 reviews) |
| 2 | 89% (85 reviews) | 87 (27 reviews) |
| 3 | 90% (101 reviews) | 84 (30 reviews) |
| 4 | 96% (113 reviews) | 86 (28 reviews) |
| 5 | 71% (104 reviews) | 65 (37 reviews) |
| 6 | 54% (87 reviews) | 61 (30 reviews) |

The Crown has been praised as a drama, being described by The Telegraph as "TV's best soap opera" and given a five out of five rating. However, some reviewers, such as in The Times, raised concerns that some episodes are based on false premises. The series has an overall score of 81% on Rotten Tomatoes and 78 on Metacritic.

The first season has an 88% critical approval rating on the review aggregator Rotten Tomatoes, based on 74 reviews with an average rating of 8.6/10. Its critical consensus reads, "Powerful performances and lavish cinematography make The Crown a top-notch production worthy of its grand subject." Metacritic gives the season a score of 81 out of 100, based on 29 critics. The second and third seasons received similarly positive reviews, while the fourth season was considered by critics to be the best season. The response to the fifth season, while still positive, was less favourable; it holds a 71% rating on Rotten Tomatoes from 103 reviews, with an average rating of 6.75/10, and the critical consensus reads, "In its fifth season, it's hard to shake the feeling that this series has lost some of its lusters – but addictive drama and a sterling cast remain The Crown's jewels." The season holds a score of 65 out of 100 on Metacritic, based on 37 critics. The sixth season has a rating of 54% on Rotten Tomatoes from 87 reviews and an average rating of 6.1/10; the critical consensus reads, "Elizabeth Debicki's haunting portrayal does right by the Princess of Wales, but The Crown's final season often feels like a reign extended past its prime." On Metacritic, the season holds a score of 61 out of 100 based on 29 critics.

=== Accolades ===
The series won twenty-four Primetime Emmy Awards, including Outstanding Drama Series for its fourth season and seven awards for the cast. It also won the Golden Globe Award for Best Television Series - Drama twice, at the 74th and 78th ceremonies, with additional acting wins for Foy, Colman, Corrin, O'Connor, Anderson, and Debicki.

== Costume exhibit ==
Costumes from both The Crown and The Queen's Gambit were displayed by Brooklyn Museum as part of its virtual exhibition The Queen and the Crown. Costumes and props from The Crown were exhibited at the auctioneers Bonhams in Mayfair from January to 4 February 2024 ahead of a live sale on 7 February.

== Prequel ==
In April 2022, it was reported that Netflix and Left Bank were having preliminary conversations about a prequel. It is believed that the series will span a period of nearly 50 years, starting with the death of Queen Victoria in 1901 and ending around the wedding of Princess Elizabeth in 1947, covering the reigns of Edward VII, George V, Edward VIII, and George VI. In April 2026 the prequel was confirmed, with Morgan expected to return.

== See also ==
- British royal family
- The Crown
- King Charles III (play)
