= Cultural depictions of Edward VIII and Wallis Simpson =

Fictional and biographical depictions of Edward VIII and Wallis Simpson in culture

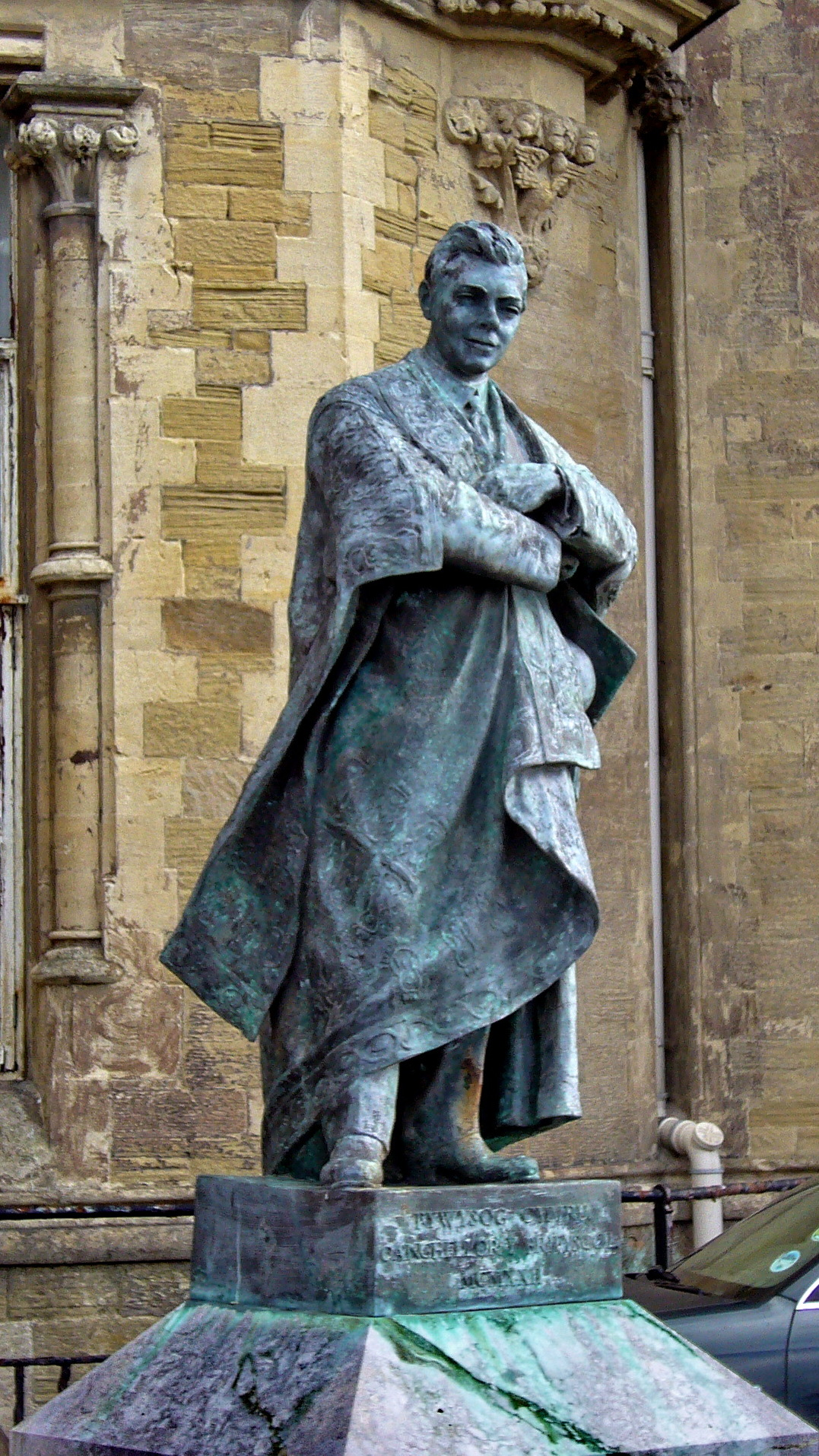
Statue of Edward VIII as Prince of Wales in Old College, Aberystwyth, Wales

Edward VIII and Wallis Simpson have been depicted in popular culture, both biographical and fictional, following his abdication in 1936 and their marriage the following year.

== Literature ==
- Robertson Davies's The Deptford Trilogy (1970 -1975) has Edward's profound effect on his public as a key element. One of the characters, Boy Staunton, is a great admirer of Edward VIII, having met him in person once and styled himself after him. His discontent upon being appointed as Lieutenant Governor of Ontario mirrors Edward's decision to choose love over his title and position.
- Several alternate history works depicting a victorious Nazi Germany assume that Edward VIII would have become a pro-Nazi puppet King (which the Nazis indeed tried to achieve in actual history - see Operation Willi).
  - Robert Harris's alternative history novel Fatherland (1992) depicts Edward VIII as the restored king of the United Kingdom alongside Wallis Simpson as part of a pro-Nazi puppet government in Britain. Like the rest of western Europe, Great Britain, although unoccupied, is forced to sign up to an E.U. (except Switzerland) which shows their loyalty to the Greater German Reich. However, the British Empire still controls its territories in Africa and Asia, Germany allows this to spread their influence around the world, whereas Canada, Australia and New Zealand are U.S. allies which recognize his niece Elizabeth as the Queen of the United Kingdom and the Commonwealth realms.
  - In Stephen Fry's Making History (1996), Adolf Hitler is never born, but the Nazi Party nevertheless is founded and takes power, led by Rudolf Glodner - a far more capable leader than Hitler. Under him, Nazi Germany develops nuclear weapons by 1938 and easily conquers the whole of Europe including Britain by 1939, its rule remaining firm and uncontested for generations to come. Also in this timeline, Edward VIII lives out his life as a puppet King, and is complicit in the brutal suppression by the Nazis of a forlorn British rebellion in 1939 and in the mass executions which follow - among those summarily shot by the occupying Nazis including the King's own brother, the Duke of York (who in other circumstances would have become King George VI).
  - Guy Walters's The Leader (2003) – an alternate history of World War II wherein Edward VIII does not abdicate but reigns as king with Wallis Simpson as queen. They rule a fascist Britain after World War II and are allied with a victorious Adolf Hitler, but are opposed by the hero of the book, Captain James Armstrong. In this scenario, Edward VIII is an ally of the Nazis rather than their complete puppet.
- In the timeline of Robert A. Heinlein's first novel For Us, The Living: A Comedy of Customs (written 1938, published 2003) - then a future history which can now be considered as a retroactive alternative history - Edward returns to England at the outbreak of war and distinguishes himself in wartime service. After the war - which ends in 1944 due to Germany's economic collapse - a European Federation is formed and Edward is made into a Constitutional Emperor of Europe, a task which he fulfills with great success. However, he dies without issue in 1970 (two years earlier than in actual history) and in the aftermath Europe is torn up in forty years of highly destructive war and is largely depopulated.
- In I Never Promised You a Rose Garden, written by Joanne Greenberg under the pseudonym Hannah Green, a mental patient believes that she is the secret first wife of Edward VIII.
- Famous Last Words, a novel by Timothy Findley, is a fictional recreation of the relationship between the Duke and Duchess of Windsor. In it, the couple conspire with Joachim von Ribbentrop to overthrow Hitler, with the intention of assuming control of the Nazi Party and taking over Europe.
- Royce Ryton's play Crown Matrimonial, telling the abdication story from Queen Mary's viewpoint, opened at the Haymarket Theatre in 1972, with Peter Barkworth as Edward, and Wendy Hiller as Queen Mary. In a televised version in 1974, Barkworth reprised his role, but Queen Mary was played by Greer Garson.
- Snoo Wilson's 1994 play HRH deals with the Duke's life in Bahamas and examines his possible role in a suggested cover-up following the murder of multi-millionaire Harry Oakes in 1943. This subject also features prominently in William Boyd's novel Any Human Heart.
- In the detective novel Thrones, Dominations, completed by Jill Paton Walsh from notes left by Dorothy L. Sayers, Lord Peter Wimsey is charged with recovering secret documents which King Edward has treated carelessly. Wimsey has an outspokenly negative opinion on Edward, whom he considers an irresponsible person unfit to be a King. Moreover, Wimsey discovers evidence of King Edward meeting secretly in France with high-level Nazi emissaries. Wimsey's report of this to the Foreign Office cannot be published, but it increases the pressure on the King to abdicate.
- In the alternate history novel The Two Georges by Harry Turtledove and Richard Dreyfuss, Edward VIII remains on the throne until his death in 1972. He is succeeded by Edward IX and later Charles III, who is the reigning monarch in 1995.
- In the alternate history novel Back in the USSA by Eugene Byrne and Kim Newman in which the United States has become a communist state in 1917, Edward VIII almost loses his throne over his relationship with Wallis Simpson in 1936. However, the abdication is averted and he and Mrs Simpson eventually marry. He remains King until his death in 1972, though with Wallis as Princess Consort rather than Queen. His near abdication later becomes the subject of a novel by Grand Duchess Anastasia Nikolaevna of Russia, the aunt of Tsar Nicholas III, which is adapted for television as a miniseries. Shortly before he dies, his great-nephew and heir presumptive Charles, Duke of Cornwall is to marry Nicholas III's eldest daughter Grand Duchess Ekaterina. While in Moscow, however, the Duke meets and falls in love with television makeup artist Cinzia Davidovna Bronstein, the granddaughter of the silent film comedian Lev Bronstein.
- In the Doctor Who Virgin New Adventures novel Timewyrm: Exodus, the Seventh Doctor and Ace visit an alternate timeline in which the Nazis won World War II. In 1940, Edward VIII is restored to the throne with Wallis Simpson as his Queen and signs a treaty which establishes Great Britain as a protectorate of the Greater German Reich.
- In the Doctor Who Past Doctor Adventures novel Players, the Sixth Doctor and Peri Brown visit England in 1936 to investigate the interference of the Doctor's time-manipulating enemies, the Players. During their time in the present, they discover that the Players have been manipulating various Nazi sympathisers in Britain to push Edward into deciding to dismiss the government and establish a new one sympathetic to Hitler's policies out of respect for his 'friendship' with Hitler, in response to the government's refusal to allow him to marry Wallis Simpson; but the Doctor and Peri - aided by Winston Churchill and his various contacts - instead have his government dismissal recorded as evidence and blackmail him into abdicating or be charged with high treason while the Nazi sympathisers are kept under observation.
- In the Southern Victory alternate history series of novels by Harry Turtledove, set in a reality where the Confederate States won the War of Secession, Edward VIII remains on the throne during the Second Great War, reigning until at least 1944. After Britain, the CSA and the rest of the Entente lose the First Great War to the Central Powers in 1917, losing Canada and Ireland as a result, a revanchist Conservative-Silvershirt coalition comes to power in 1935. Due to longstanding British-American animosity, Edward does not become romantically involved with Wallis Simpson.
- In the alternate history novel The Man Who Prevented WW2 by Roy Carter, Edward VIII is assassinated by Jerome Bannigan on 18 July 1936. It is suspected that the Prime Minister Sir Oswald Mosley, who has come to power when the British Union of Fascists won a landslide victory in the 1935 election, is responsible for his murder. After his death, the BUF government abolishes the monarchy and places the Royal Family under house arrest in Balmoral Castle until they are expatriated to Switzerland in September 1939. His younger brother and heir presumptive Albert, Duke of York (who would have become George VI if the monarchy had not been abolished) is given the deed to the Royal Hotel in Geneva. His mother Queen Mary is disturbed that he has become an innkeeper and even more disturbed that she is an innkeeper's mother. However, the Duke later establishes a successful hotel chain.
- In the alternate history short story "First to the Moon!" by Stephen Baxter and Simon Bradshaw, Edward VIII remains king.
- In Collaborator, a novel by Murray Davies, when the Nazis conquer the United Kingdom and the Irish Free State, the Duke of Windsor returns to rule as Regent, whilst Samuel Hoare is the puppet Prime Minister.
- In Len Deighton's alternative history novel SS-GB, Nazi Germany wins Battle of Britain and conquers the United Kingdom. The Duke of Windsor never collaborates with the Nazis and escapes to the Bahamas.

== Film and television ==
The abdication of Edward VIII was featured in the multi-award-winning historical drama film The King’s Speech, in which his decision to stand down was depicted solely upon his desire to marry Wallis Simpson.

The abdication is mentioned frequently in the first season of the Netflix television series The Crown, in which the former King, now titled the Duke of Windsor, returns to London for the funeral of King George VI and accession of Elizabeth II. Queen Mary is depicted as continuing her condemnation of his marriage to Mrs Simpson and his decision to abdicate, and faces animosity towards his attendance of Elizabeth's coronation, subsequently declining his invitation. His abdication is also cited as a factor in the opposition to the marriage of Princess Margaret and Group Captain Peter Townsend.

The sixth episode of the second season features the Duke returning to London in a bid to ask Queen Elizabeth II for forgiveness of his abdication and to allow him to work for the monarchy. However, following her being informed of The Marburg Files, which detailed facts of the Duke's relationship with Nazi Germany, plus further damning information from former private secretary Tommy Lascelles, and continuing animosity from the Queen Elizabeth The Queen Mother and Prince Philip, she admonishes him and asks him to return to Britain only at the request of the monarch.

Edward has been portrayed by:

- John Greenidge in the silent film The Scarlet Woman: An Ecclesiastical Melodrama (1925)
- Richard Chamberlain in the American television drama The Woman I Love (1972), which focused on the love between Edward VIII and Mrs Simpson
- Peter Barkworth in the LWT adaptation of the Royce Ryton play Crown Matrimonial (1974)
- Ian Ogilvy in the BBC television drama The Gathering Storm (1974), based on the book by Winston Churchill
- Edward Fox in the Thames Television drama series Edward & Mrs Simpson (1978), based on the 1974 biography Edward VIII by Frances Donaldson
- David Yelland in Chariots of Fire (1981); during a meeting with the Olympic committee regarding the status of British runner Eric Liddell, Lord Birkenhead (Nigel Davenport) calls him 'David' - he was known to close friends and family by this name.
- Madison Mason in the episode of the American television series Tales of the Gold Monkey, entitled "God Save the Queen" (1983)
- John Standing in the television drama To Catch a King (1984), based on the novel by Jack Higgins
- Anthony Andrews in the HTV drama The Woman He Loved (1988)
- Peter Sands in the LWT drama Beryl Markham: A Shadow on the Sun (1988)
- Andrew Ray in the television drama Passion in Paradise (1989), about the murder of Sir Harry Oakes; Ray had previously portrayed Edward's brother (the future George VI) in both Crown Matrimonial and the television series Edward and Mrs Simpson (above)
- Jonathan Weightman in the Portuguese film Passagem por Lisboa (1994)
- William Boyde in the television series A Dance to the Music of Time (1997), based on the novels by Anthony Powell
- Charles Edwards in the Carlton Television drama Bertie and Elizabeth (2002)
- Julian Firth in the BBC television series Cambridge Spies (2003)
- Stephen Campbell Moore in the television drama Wallis & Edward (2005), billed as the first scripted account of the romance from Mrs Simpson's point of view.
- Guy Pearce in the 2010 Oscar-winning film The King's Speech, a film about his brother Bertie's battle to overcome a stammer, a task made still more imperative when Bertie (played by Colin Firth) ascended to the throne because of Edward's abdication.
- Tom Hollander in the 2010 television adaptation of Any Human Heart.
- James D'Arcy in the 2011 film W.E., directed by Madonna.
- Oliver Dimsdale in the 2013 Christmas episode of the ITV Studios/Carnival Films period drama Downton Abbey.
- Alex Jennings (seasons 1 & 2) and Derek Jacobi (season 3) in the 2016 Netflix series The Crown.

He has also been used as a cultural reference. In Lady of the Night, Chunky reads a paper which proclaims Edward "The Best Dressed Man in the World", prompting him to go to a tailor with his suits and demand: "You fix these! I want to look like that Wales guy!".

Mrs. Simpson has been portrayed by:

- Faye Dunaway in The Woman I Love (1972, television drama)
- Cynthia Harris in Edward & Mrs. Simpson (1978, television miniseries)
- Barbara Parkins in To Catch a King (1983, television movie)
- Jane Seymour in The Woman He Loved (1988, television movie)
- Jane Hartley in Always (1997, West End musical)
- Amber Sealey in Bertie and Elizabeth (2002, television film)
- Joely Richardson in Wallis & Edward (2005, television film)
- Gillian Anderson in Any Human Heart (2010, television mini-series)
- Emma Clifford in Upstairs, Downstairs (2010, television mini-series)
- Eve Best in The King's Speech (2010)
- Andrea Riseborough in W.E. (2011)
- Lia Williams (seasons 1 & 2) and Geraldine Chaplin (season 3) in The Crown (2016, television series).

== Other ==
- I've danced with a man, who's danced with a girl, who's danced with the Prince of Wales was a 1927 popular music hall and cabaret song written at the height of Edward's popularity as Prince of Wales, inspired by an incident at the Ascot Cabaret Ball, where he asked ballroom dancing champion Edna Deane to dance with him nine times; it was the theme for the 1978 ITV television series Edward & Mrs. Simpson
- The calypso song "Edward VIII", by the Trinidadian calypsonian Lord Caresser, told the story of Edward's abdication and was the most popular record of its kind in 1937. The song included the chorus:

It's love, love alone,
that caused King Edward to leave the throne

- Portrait of Wallis, Duchess of Windsor (1939) by Gerald Brockhurst
- The last verse of the Status Quo song "Blessed Are The Meek", from their album Under The Influence, refers to the abdication of Edward VIII
- The Japanese all-female theatre troupe Takarazuka Revue adapted the story of Edward VIII's abdication into a romantic musical in 2012, with heavy focus on the courtship of the King and Mrs Simpson.
- The Rolling Stones song "Blinded by Love" (from the 1989 album Steel Wheels) mentions, among other historical relationships, Edward and Wallis in the verse, "The poor Prince of Wales, He gave up his crown, All for the trivial pursuit of A parvenu second-hand lady."
- The real time historical simulation game Hearts of Iron 4 gives the player an option to explore an alternate historical path in which Edward VIII restored royal authority to a greater degree, and even allows the player to conquer the United States and impose Wallis Simpson as Queen Wallis I, leader of the newly reconstituted United States.
