= The Crown season 2 =

Season of television series

The Crown
- Season 2
- Promotional poster
- Starring: Claire Foy; Matt Smith; Vanessa Kirby; Jeremy Northam; Anton Lesser; Greg Wise; Victoria Hamilton; Matthew Goode; Alex Jennings; Lia Williams
- No. of episodes: 10

Release
- Original network: Netflix
- Original release: 8 December 2017

Season chronology
- ← Previous; Season 1 Next → Season 3

The second season of The Crown follows the life and reign of Queen Elizabeth II. It consists of ten episodes and was released by Netflix on 8 December 2017.

Claire Foy stars as Elizabeth, with main cast members Matt Smith, Vanessa Kirby, Jeremy Northam, Greg Wise, Victoria Hamilton, Alex Jennings and Lia Williams reprising their roles from the first season. Anton Lesser and Matthew Goode are added to the main cast. Original main cast members Jared Harris, John Lithgow, and Ben Miles also return in cameo appearances.

== Premise ==
The Crown traces the life of Queen Elizabeth II from her wedding in 1947 through to the present day. Season two covers the period between 1956 and 1964.

Claire Foy continues to portray the Queen, and the season covers the Suez Crisis in 1956, the retirement of the Queen's third Prime Minister Harold Macmillan in 1963, following the Profumo affair political scandal, and the births of the Queen's two youngest sons – Prince Andrew in 1960 and Prince Edward in 1964. The season also portrays John F. Kennedy, Jackie Kennedy and Lord Altrincham.

== Cast ==
=== Main ===
- Claire Foy as Queen Elizabeth II
- Matt Smith as Prince Philip, Duke of Edinburgh, Elizabeth's husband
- Vanessa Kirby as Princess Margaret, Countess of Snowdon, Elizabeth's younger sister
- Jeremy Northam as Prime Minister Anthony Eden
- Anton Lesser as Harold Macmillan, Anthony Eden's successor as Prime Minister
- Greg Wise as Lord Mountbatten, Philip's ambitious uncle and great-grandson of Queen Victoria
- Victoria Hamilton as Queen Elizabeth the Queen Mother, King George VI's widow and Elizabeth's mother
- Matthew Goode as Antony Armstrong-Jones, a society photographer who marries Princess Margaret

==== Featured ====
The following actors are credited in the opening titles of up to two episodes:

- Alex Jennings as Prince Edward, Duke of Windsor, formerly King Edward VIII, who abdicated in favour of his younger brother in order to marry Wallis Simpson
- Lia Williams as Wallis, Duchess of Windsor, the Duke of Windsor's American wife
- John Heffernan as Lord Altrincham, a writer who pens a scathing criticism of the Queen
- Gemma Whelan as Patricia Campbell, a secretary who works with Altrincham and types up his editorial; later Lord Altrincham's wife
- Paul Sparks as Billy Graham, a prominent American preacher with whom Elizabeth consults
- Jared Harris as King George VI, Elizabeth's father, known to his family as Bertie
- John Lithgow as Sir Winston Churchill, the Queen's first Prime Minister
- Ben Miles as Group Captain Peter Townsend, George VI's former equerry and Princess Margaret's ex-fiancé
- Michael C. Hall as John F. Kennedy, 35th President of the United States
- Jodi Balfour as Jacqueline Kennedy, the First Lady of the United States
- Burghart Klaußner as Dr Kurt Hahn, the founder of Gordonstoun school
- Finn Elliot as school-aged Prince Philip
- Julian Baring as school-aged Prince Charles, Elizabeth and Philip's eldest child and the heir apparent

=== Recurring ===
- Billy Jenkins as young Prince Charles
- Will Keen as Michael Adeane, Private Secretary to the Queen
- Daniel Ings as Mike Parker, Private Secretary to the Duke of Edinburgh
- Chloe Pirrie as Eileen Parker, wife of Mike Parker
- Pip Torrens as Tommy Lascelles, Former Private Secretary to the Queen
- Harry Hadden-Paton as Martin Charteris, Assistant Private Secretary to the Queen
- Clive Francis as Lord Salisbury, Leader of the House of Lords
- Nicholas Burns as Anthony Nutting, Minister of State for Foreign Affairs
- Lizzy McInnerny as Bobo MacDonald, Principal Dresser to the Queen
- Lucy Russell as Lady Mountbatten, wife of Lord Mountbatten and Prince Philip's maternal aunt by marriage
- George Asprey as Walter Monckton, Minister of Defence
- Richard Elfyn as Selwyn Lloyd, Foreign Secretary; later Chancellor of the Exchequer
- Michael Culkin as Rab Butler, Deputy Prime Minister of the United Kingdom
- Adrian Lukis as Vice-Admiral Conolly Abel Smith, Commanding Officer of HMY Britannia
- Sophie Leigh Stone as Princess Alice, Philip's mother
- Guy Williams as Prince Andrew, Philip's father
- Leonie Benesch as Princess Cecilie, Philip's sister
- Simon Paisley Day as Meryn Lewis, solicitor to Eileen Parker
- Andy Sanderson as Prince Henry, Duke of Gloucester, Elizabeth II's paternal uncle
- Mark Tandy as Cecil Beaton, Court Photographer to the British Royal Family
- Sylvestra Le Touzel as Lady Dorothy Macmillan, wife of Harold Macmillan
- Catherine Bailey as Lady Elizabeth Cavendish, Lady-in-waiting to Princess Margaret
- Joseph Kloska as Henry "Porchey" Herbert, Lord Porchester, Racing Manager to the Queen
- Paul Clayton as Bob Boothby, Former Parliamentary Secretary to the Ministry of Food, Lady Dorothy Macmillan's lover
- Yolanda Kettle as Camilla Fry, Jeremy's wife
- Ed Cooper Clarke as Jeremy Fry, Camilla's husband
- Alice Hewkin as Jacqui Chan, Tony Armstrong-Jones's ex-girlfriend
- Ryan Sampson as Dudley Moore, English actor, comedian, musician and composer
- Tim Steed as John Profumo, Secretary of State for War
- Lyla Barrett-Rye as school-aged Princess Anne, Elizabeth and Philip's second child and only daughter
  - Grace and Amelia Gilmour as young Princess Anne (uncredited)
- Robert Irons as Freddie Bishop
- Patrick Warner as Peter Cook, English comedian
- James Laurenson as Doctor Weir, Physician to the Queen
- Oliver Maltman as Jim Orr, Private Secretary to the Duke of Edinburgh
- David Annen as Alec Douglas-Home, Foreign Secretary; later Prime Minister of the United Kingdom
- Richard Lintern as Stephen Ward, English osteopath and artist who was one of the central figures in the 1963 Profumo affair
- Gala Gordon as Christine Keeler, English model and showgirl

=== Guest ===
- Amir Boutrous as President Nasser, President of Egypt
- Julius D'Silva as Baron Nahum, Court Photographer to the British Royal Family
- Patrick Ryecart as the Duke of Norfolk, Earl Marshal and Chief Butler of England
- Anna Madeley as Clarissa Eden, Anthony Eden's wife (and Sir Winston Churchill's niece)
- Tom Durant-Pritchard as Billy Wallace, Princess Margaret's close friend
- Pip Carter as Colin Tennant, Lady Anne Tennant's husband
- Grace Stone as Lady Anne Tennant, Colin Tennant's wife (and Princess Margaret's lady-in-waiting)
- Abigail Parmenter as Judy Montagu, close friend of Princess Margaret
- Josh Taylor as Johnny Dalkeith, Princess Margaret's close friend (also the Duchess of Gloucester's nephew)
- Jo Herbert as Mary Charteris, Martin Charteris's wife
- Bertie Carvel as Robin Day, the journalist who interviewed Lord Altrincham
- Gareth Marks as Major Fruity Metcalfe, close friend and equerry to the Duke of Windsor
- Rebecca Saire as Lady Alexandra Metcalfe, wife of Major Fruity Metcalfe
- Anna Chancellor as the Countess of Rosse, Antony Armstrong-Jones's mother
- Danny Sapani as Kwame Nkrumah, the President of Ghana
- Richard Clifford as Norman Hartnell, Royal Warrant as Dressmaker to the Queen
- Sam Crane as Patrick Plunket, Deputy Master of the Royal Household
- Julian Ovenden as Robert F. Kennedy, the 64th United States Attorney General and President John F. Kennedy's brother
- Clare Holman as Princess Marina, Duchess of Kent, paternal aunt-by-marriage of Elizabeth, paternal first cousin of Prince Philip and widow of Prince George, Duke of Kent

== Episodes ==
| No. overall | No. in season | Title | Directed by | Written by | Original release date |
|---|---|---|---|---|---|
| 11 | 1 | "Misadventure" | Philip Martin | Peter Morgan | 8 December 2017 |
In February 1957, Elizabeth and Philip discuss the state of their marriage aboard the HMY Britannia in Lisbon, Portugal; both acknowledge that divorce is not an option. Five months earlier, as Philip prepares for his royal tour, Elizabeth becomes convinced he is having an affair after finding a photograph of ballerina Galina Ulanova in his briefcase. At 10 Downing Street, Chancellor of the Exchequer Harold Macmillan challenges Eden's solution to Egypt's takeover of the Suez Canal but ultimately agrees to military intervention. Mountbatten informs Elizabeth about the plan, and she confronts Eden after learning that Israel has invaded Sinai. Eden reveals that the invasion was not only planned but part of a secret agreement between the Israeli, French, and British governments to reclaim the Suez Canal without approval from Parliament or the United Nations. Elizabeth reluctantly agrees, and Eden authorises British forces to enter Egypt.
| 12 | 2 | "A Company of Men" | Philip Martin | Peter Morgan | 8 December 2017 |
Eden travels to Jamaica with his wife after international political pressure forces him to withdraw British forces from Egypt and damages his reputation. Philip continues his tour, punctuated by an interview he ends when the reporter inquires about his family history. At Christmas, Philip delivers a heartfelt radio address from Graham Land, prompting Elizabeth to let him know his family is waiting for him as part of her own Christmas address. Eileen Parker, the wife of Philip's private secretary Michael, initiates divorce proceedings on infidelity grounds. Charteris warns Adeane the fallout could cause the press to ask questions about Elizabeth and Philip's own marriage.
| 13 | 3 | "Lisbon" | Philip Martin | Peter Morgan | 8 December 2017 |
Eden returns from Jamaica and discovers that the Cabinet and the Conservative Party blame him for the Suez Crisis fallout, and have turned against him. As he resigns and Macmillan becomes Prime Minister, Adeane works with Tommy Lascelles to change Eileen's mind about her divorce. They fail, and Elizabeth, Philip, and Michael learn about the proceedings. Elizabeth's attempt to speak to Eileen also fails and Philip forces Michael to resign when the divorce becomes public knowledge. Elizabeth brings the royal tour to an end before meeting the Britannia in Lisbon and privately talking with Philip about their marriage. Philip makes it clear he resents Charles outranking him and wants more respect from both the courtiers and the palace staff. Philip is made a Prince of the United Kingdom, with the style "His Royal Highness The Prince Philip, Duke of Edinburgh". After the ceremony, Michael Adeane shaves at Elizabeth's request and Philip says goodbye to Michael Parker, who returns to his native Australia, thanking each other for the life they shared.
| 14 | 4 | "Beryl" | Benjamin Caron | Amy Jenkins and Peter Morgan | 8 December 2017 |
Still recovering from her decision not to marry Townsend, Margaret accepts a proposal from close friend Billy Wallace and, after gaining Elizabeth's blessing, plans to announce the union during a gala celebrating Elizabeth and Philip's tenth wedding anniversary. On the night of the announcement, however, Margaret breaks off the engagement after finding a drunk Wallace recovering from wounds he received during a duel. The following evening, after a discussion with the Queen Mother about her birthday portrait, Margaret meets photographer Tony Armstrong-Jones at a party and agrees to let him take her picture. Sometime later, she sneaks out to Tony's studio for a sitting. He takes several photographs, after which Margaret asks him to send one to the newspapers. The next day, the picture, in which Margaret appears to be nude, is published to great shock. Macmillan, meanwhile, presses his wife into ending her affair but later discovers that she is still seeing her lover after overhearing them on the telephone.
| 15 | 5 | "Marionettes" | Philippa Lowthorpe | Peter Morgan | 8 December 2017 |
In response to a speech given by Elizabeth at a car factory in 1956, Lord Altrincham writes an article attacking her style of public speaking and her court's upper-class attitude. Both the general public and the press are initially opposed to Altrincham, but start to sympathise with him after he argues on TV that the monarchy must adapt to the post-war society. After Macmillan reminds her of the tendency of other nations to abolish their monarchies, Elizabeth arranges a meeting with Altrincham, during which she agrees to televise the upcoming Royal Christmas Message and open the Debutante Ball to her subjects. Six months later, the Queen Mother expresses embarrassment over the monarchy's loss of authority while hosting a garden party.
| 16 | 6 | "Vergangenheit" | Philippa Lowthorpe | Peter Morgan | 8 December 2017 |
In 1945, a surrendering German soldier leads American troops to classified documents previously belonging to Adolf Hitler's personal translator. British translators uncover damning information in a series called the Marburg Files, which Churchill and King George VI agree to suppress from publication. In the 1950s, the Duke of Windsor returns to the UK to seek employment. Historians uncover the files, and the American government threatens to publish them if the British government does not. The matter is brought to Macmillan and then to Elizabeth, who learns about the Duke's past links with Nazi High Command. Elizabeth confronts the Duke, who explained his reasons. Elizabeth contemplates forgiving the Duke, but Philip persuades her to pay Tommy Lascelles a visit. Lascelles, who served as the Duke's private secretary, reveals more details to Elizabeth. Elizabeth denies the Duke's request, berating him for his betrayal, and seeks spiritual counsel from the evangelist Billy Graham.
| 17 | 7 | "Matrimonium" | Benjamin Caron | Peter Morgan | 8 December 2017 |
After learning that Townsend is engaged to a much younger woman, Margaret presses Tony into proposing marriage. Because Elizabeth is pregnant with her third child, protocol prevents her from announcing the engagement. Adeane and Lascelles learn Tony has enjoyed a series of sexual relationships, one with a woman presumed to be pregnant with his child. After giving birth to Prince Andrew, Elizabeth decides against telling Margaret. Months later, Margaret and Tony get married at Westminster Abbey on 6 May 1960.
| 18 | 8 | "Dear Mrs Kennedy" | Stephen Daldry | Peter Morgan | 8 December 2017 |
Elizabeth hosts US President John F. Kennedy and First Lady Jackie Kennedy at Buckingham Palace in June 1961 for dinner, and finds common ground with the First Lady. Later, Elizabeth discovers the First Lady had insulted her and the Palace at a party. When President Kwame Nkrumah of Ghana seeks closer ties to the Soviet Union, Elizabeth personally intervenes to bring Ghana back into the fold of the Commonwealth. When the First Lady returns to London, she apologises to Elizabeth, explaining that she had been under the influence of "substances". In 1963, after watching news coverage of Kennedy's assassination, Elizabeth arranges for a week of mourning within the household, and for the bells at Westminster Abbey to be rung, before writing a letter to the First Lady.
| 19 | 9 | "Paterfamilias" | Stephen Daldry | Tom Edge and Peter Morgan | 8 December 2017 |
Philip arranges for Charles to attend Gordonstoun in Moray, Scotland despite protests from Elizabeth and Mountbatten, both of whom recommend Eton College. Philip, however, gets his way after using his deal with Elizabeth to compel her to back him. While taking Charles to the school, Philip recalls his time there, as well as the death of his older sister Cecilie and her family, for which his father Andrew blamed him. Charles struggles with Gordonstoun's rigorous curriculum and, on the day of a school event, disappears, only for his security detail to find him crying. Philip takes Charles home, admonishing him for being "bloody weak" after an attempt to give him a pep talk fails.
| 20 | 10 | "Mystery Man" | Benjamin Caron | Peter Morgan | 8 December 2017 |
In 1962, Philip visits osteopath Stephen Ward after injuring his neck. The following year, knowledge of an affair between Secretary of State for War John Profumo and model Christine Keeler, who is believed to have simultaneously been involved with Soviet military attaché Captain Yevgeny Ivanov, becomes public. As Ward is charged with immorality offences and brought to trial, the press speculates about the identity of a "mystery man" seen in a photograph taken at one of Ward's parties, with Margaret and Tony noticing the man's similarities to Philip. Ward commits suicide before a verdict is reached, after which the police find a hand-drawn portrait of Philip among his belongings. Macmillan resigns on ill health grounds and recommends Alec Douglas-Home succeed him. Douglas-Home's close ties to the royal family make the appointment controversial. Elizabeth asks Philip if he is the mystery man and confronts him with Ulanova's portrait. Philip admits to knowing Ward but denies attending any of his parties, and reaffirms his love and support for Elizabeth, who gives birth to Prince Edward.

== Release ==
The second season was released on Netflix worldwide in its entirety on 8 December 2017. Season two was released on DVD and Blu-ray in the United Kingdom on 22 October 2018 and worldwide on 13 November 2018.

== Music ==
The Crown: Season Two

Soundtrack album by Rupert Gregson-Williams and Lorne Balfe
- Released: 8 December 2017
- Genre: Soundtrack
- Length: 58:57
- Label: Sony Music

Rupert Gregson-Williams soundtrack chronology
| Wonder Woman (2017) | The Crown: Season Two (2017) | The Alienist (2018) |

Lorne Balfe soundtrack chronology
| Geostorm (2017) | The Crown: Season Two (2017) | 12 Strong (2018) |

| No. | Title | Length |
|---|---|---|
| 1. | "Bounden Duty" | 3:35 |
| 2. | "Dismissed" | 3:40 |
| 3. | "The Downfall" | 6:19 |
| 4. | "Homesick" | 3:41 |
| 5. | "Your Majesty" | 4:14 |
| 6. | "Headlines" | 4:24 |
| 7. | "Radio Speech" | 3:50 |
| 8. | "Future King" | 2:21 |
| 9. | "Christmas Message" | 3:58 |
| 10. | "New Guinea Match" | 1:56 |
| 11. | "We Shall Go to War" | 2:17 |
| 12. | "Be My Portrait" | 2:37 |
| 13. | "Philip's Dream" | 3:00 |
| 14. | "Princess Margaret" | 3:01 |
| 15. | "Critical Article" | 1:23 |
| 16. | "I Have No Choice" | 3:27 |
| 17. | "A New Chapter" | 1:56 |
| 18. | "Bring Him Home" | 3:09 |
| Total length: | | 58:57 |

== Reception ==
Rotten Tomatoes reported an 89% approval rating for the second season based on 85 reviews, with an average rating of 8.30/10. The website's critical consensus read "The Crown continues its reign with a self-assured sophomore season that indulges in high drama and sumptuous costumes." On Metacritic, the second season holds a score of 87 out of 100, based on 27 critics.

Foy and Smith both earned significant praise from critics. Chancellor Agard of Entertainment Weekly wrote "As always, Claire Foy turns in an amazingly restrained performance." Reviewing the first episode, Gabriel Tate of The Daily Telegraph wrote that Foy and Smith have "seldom been better". Hugo Rifkind of The Times said "While ardent monarchists might bristle at the way this is going, for the rest of us it's getting better and better".

Alison Keene of Collider said "each new episode makes its mark and tells its own complete story... It's another exceptionally strong season of television, full of compelling drama and sweeping grandeur". Krutika Malikarjuna of TV Guide argued that the public is attracted to the royals' celebrity and star power, and said: "The brilliance of this framing becomes clear as the show evolves into The Real Housewives of Buckingham." Sophie Gilbert wrote for The Atlantic that the portrayal of a monarch who "would rather be living any other life" is "riveting", and that it is "gorgeously shot, with flawless re-creations of everything from the Throne Room in Buckingham Palace to a 1950s hospital ward. And it's surprisingly funny."

The Wall Street Journal critic John Anderson said "The Crown attains genuine sexiness without sex. Margaret, à la Ms. Kirby's interpretation, smolders, as does Elizabeth, at least on occasion." Meghan O'Keefe of Decider wrote that the season "continues to romanticize the British royal family, but the romance comes from how they're normal, not divine".

Less complimentary reviews saw the season criticised for what some regarded as failing to meet the emotional intensity of the first. John Doyle wrote for Globe and Mail that despite being "lavishly made" and "breathtaking", it "now leans toward a three-hanky weeper about marriage. It is less than it was, like the monarchy itself, and of interest to monarchy fans only." Alan Sepinwall of Uproxx added "Many of the season's wounds are self-inflicted" and that Philip "still comes across as a whiny man-child". Phil Owen of The Wrap described the season as "trashy" and saw dry comedy in Northam's portrayal of Eden: "I'm assuming that creator Peter Morgan meant for it to be comedy. There's really no other explanation for why Jeremy Northam played Prime Minister Anthony Eden like he's having a nervous breakdown in every scene."

Claire Foy won the 2018 Primetime Emmy Award for Outstanding Lead Actress in a Drama Series for her performance in the episode Dear Mrs Kennedy. Stephen Daldry won the 2018 Primetime Emmy Award for Outstanding Directing for a Drama Series for the episode "Paterfamilias."

== Historical accuracy ==
After season two was released, Peggy Noonan of The Wall Street Journal commented on its historical inaccuracy, and argued for "more truth in art and entertainment". Baron Nahum, for instance, continued to be featured in the season, but in reality had died in 1956. In the first episode, a picture of the Queen is hung in the offices of the Suez Canal company and English seems to be the working language, while the company was run under French law and much of the staff was French. The show also depicts the Queen as giving a speech at a Jaguar factory, when in reality there is no evidence that she gave a speech there. Similarly, while it is possible that she might have met Lord Altrincham to discuss his article, there is no record of it.

Hugo Vickers wrote that the Queen did condemn the Duke of Windsor after she read the Marburg Files, but suggested that the series gave the false implication that the Duke was banished from the royal family upon publication. In reality, the Duke remained in contact with his family, and his public appearances continued.

The depiction of the relationship between the American First Lady Jackie Kennedy and the royal family also drew criticism as inaccurate; reports from the time indicate that she had described Prince Philip as "nice but nervous", with no real bond between them. The implication that the Queen visited Ghana to compete with Kennedy's popularity was ridiculed by critics. Reviews noted that that episode ignored more significant events, such as President Kennedy's sister-in-law Lee and her husband Prince Stanisław Albrecht Radziwiłł's initial exclusion from the banquet invitation list due to their divorcee status; they were eventually invited, although Princess Margaret and Princess Marina did not attend, despite the Kennedys apparently wanting to meet them.

Gordonstoun School responded to its negative portrayal, claiming that Prince Charles's personal feedback to the school had been overwhelmingly positive. Vickers said that the same episode inaccurately depicted Prince Philip's sister's death in a plane crash as having arisen from his own misbehaviour at Gordonstoun: "It is beyond me how serious film-makers would wish to turn such a dreadful tragedy into a series of invented scenes bearing no relation to the truth". Vickers later added that Philip considered suing the show's producers over the inaccurate portrayal of his sister's death and its aftermath.

Phil Owen of The Wrap saw dry comedy in Northam's portrayal of Prime Minister Eden, stating: "I'm assuming that creator Peter Morgan meant for it to be comedy. There's really no other explanation for why Jeremy Northam played Prime Minister Anthony Eden like he's having a nervous breakdown in every scene."
