= Degenershausen Estate =

Coordinates: 51.6869°N 11.3031°E

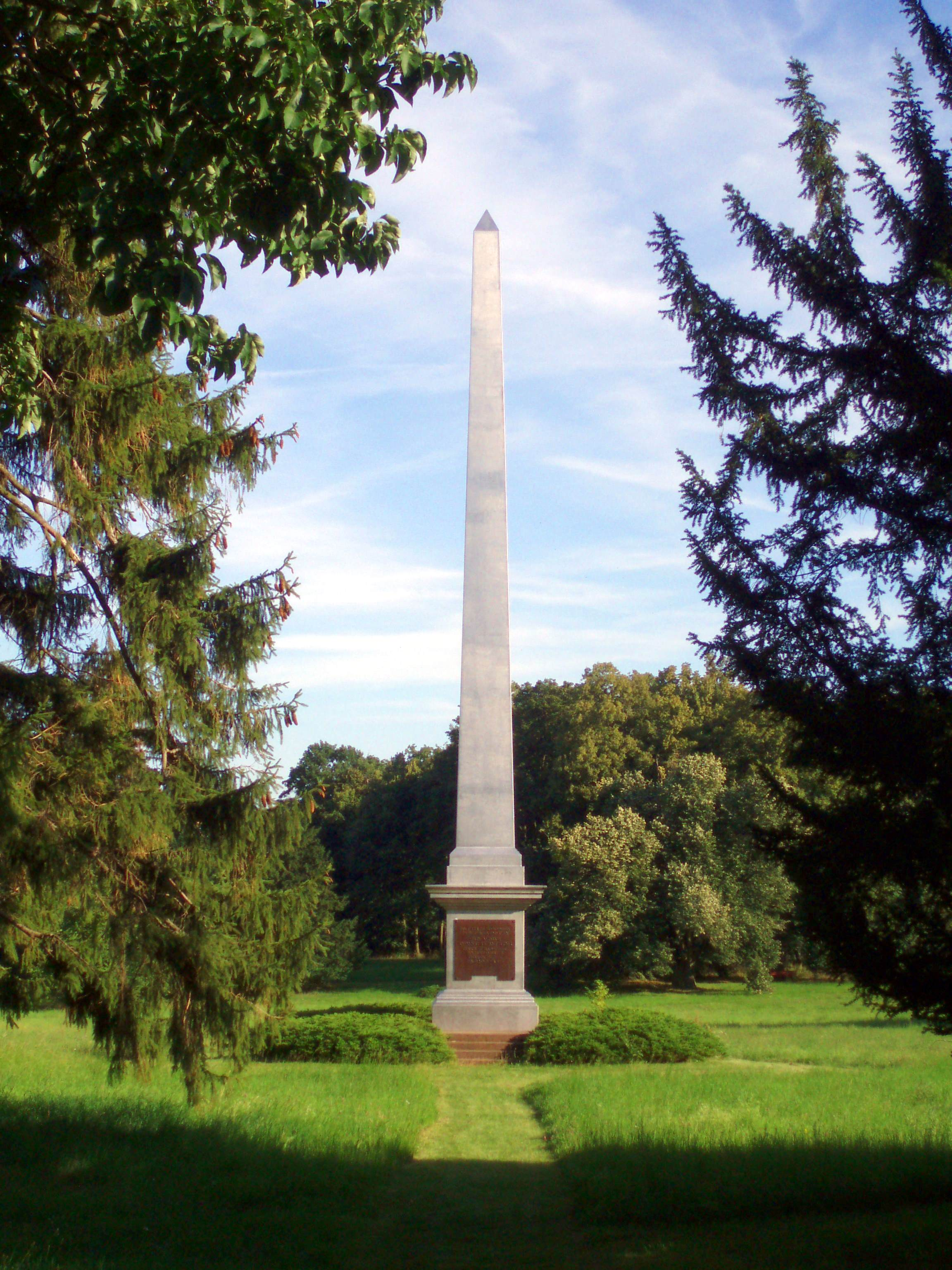
Degenershausen Landscape Park

The Degenershausen Estate (German: Gutsbezirk Degenershausen) was established in 1872 in accordance with the Prussian County Act of 1872 as an independent municipal estate together with a manor house. In 1928 the municipal estate was disbanded by an act of 27 December 1927. The estate then belonged to the municipality of Wieserode, now a village in the borough of Falkenstein, Harz county in the German state of Saxony-Anhalt. The owner of the estate during this period were Fideikommissherren Hans-Heinrich Freiherr von Bodenhausen-Degener (1839–1912), Eberhard Freiherr von Bodenhausen-Degener (1868–1918) and Hans Wilke Freiherr von Bodenhausen-Degener (1901–1937). The estate figured in the Allied discovery of the Marburg Files as World War II was ending. The estate is now a landscape park (Landschaftspark Degenershausen) which is also checkpoint no. 202 in the Harzer Wandernadel hiking network.

== Garden dreams ==
Degenershausen Landscape Park is part of the Saxony-Anhalt Garden Dreams project.

== Literature ==
- Maria von Katte: Der Park von Degenershausen und seine Menschen - Eine Chronik der Jahre 1806-2012. 2nd revised and expanded edition. Privat press, Wolfenbüttel, 2012.
- Georg Langlotz: Zwischen Selke und Wipper - Dörfer und Städte des Unterharzes, bekanntes und unbekanntes zu ihrer Geschichte. Selke Wipper GbR, ISBN 978-3-00-020316-9
