= Michael Parker (courtier) =

Private secretary to the Duke of Edinburgh

Michael Parker CVO AM

Private Secretary to The Duke of Edinburgh
- In office 1947–1957
- Succeeded by: James Orr

Personal details
- Born: 23 June 1920 Melbourne, Australia
- Died: 30 December 2001 (aged 81) Melbourne, Australia
- Spouse(s): Eileen Allan (m. 1943; div. 1958) Carol Thompson (m. 1962; div.) Jean Ramsay (m. 1976)
- Children: 4
- Education: Xavier College

Military service
- Allegiance: United Kingdom
- Branch/service: Royal Australian Navy; Royal Navy
- Years of service: 1938–1947
- Rank: Lieutenant-Commander
- Unit: HMS Lauderdale; HMS Wessex; HMS Wallace
- Battles/wars: Second World War

Lieutenant-Commander John Michael Avison Parker, CVO, AM (23 June 1920 – 29 December 2001) was an Australian who served as an officer of the Royal Navy (RN) during World War II, and was Private Secretary to Philip, Duke of Edinburgh, from 1947 to 1957.

== Early life and education ==
Parker was born in Melbourne on 23 June 1920. The son of Captain C. A. Parker, he was educated at Xavier College, Melbourne.

== Career ==
Parker served in the Royal Australian Navy, and then the Royal Navy, between 1938 and 1947, reaching the rank of lieutenant-commander. He fought at the Battle of Narvik, and later was First Lieutenant of HMS Lauderdale in 1942, then of HMS Wessex in the 27th Destroyer Flotilla of the British Pacific Fleet.

Parker first met the then Prince Philip of Greece and Denmark in 1942, when Philip was assigned to the destroyer HMS Wallace as a sub-lieutenant. They became close friends. In 1947, when Philip was created Duke of Edinburgh in the Peerage of the United Kingdom, Parker joined the Household of the Duke of Edinburgh as Private Secretary, initially on a part-time basis. He also became Equerry to the Duke and the Duchess of Edinburgh (who later, in 1952, became The Queen of the United Kingdom of Great Britain and Northern Ireland). The Duke brought Parker into the "Thursday Club," an exclusive weekly luncheon group.

In 1952, Parker was in Kenya with the royal couple and broke the news initially to the Duke, who then told his wife, of King George VI's death. Parker became full-time Private Secretary to the Duke. Parker was created Member of the Royal Victorian Order (MVO) in 1953, and Commander (CVO) in 1957. He accompanied the Duke on his 1956 five-month world tour aboard HMY Britannia.

Parker's divorce in 1958, reported on extensively in the media, forced him to resign as the Duke's Private Secretary. He was succeeded in that role by James Orr. Parker remained in contact with the Duke until the end of his life. Parker worked for aircraft builder Lockheed Corporation and advertising agency Leo Burnett Worldwide. He returned to live in Australia in the late 1960s. He became chairman of Australian Dredging and General Services, and was a director of Sperry Australia.

In the 1996 Australia Day Honours, he was appointed a Member of the Order of Australia for "service to education, particularly through the Plain English Speaking Award Scheme, and to the community".

== Personal life ==
Parker married Eileen Allan in 1942, with whom he had a son and a daughter. The marriage was dissolved in 1958. Eileen wrote a 1982 book called Step Aside for Royalty in which she claimed her husband and the Duke of Edinburgh used the pseudonyms Murgatroyd and Winterbottom to "gallivant out of the palace". Parker denied the claim.

In 1962 Parker married Carol Serena, daughter of Sir Ivo Wilfrid Home Thompson, 2nd Baronet. They had a daughter and son; the marriage was dissolved. In 1976, he married Jean Ramsay.

Parker died in Melbourne, Australia, in December 2001.

== In popular culture ==
Parker is portrayed by Daniel Ings in the Netflix series The Crown.
