= Marburger Schloss =

Castle in Marburg, Hesse, Germany

Coordinates: 50.810222°N 8.767017°E

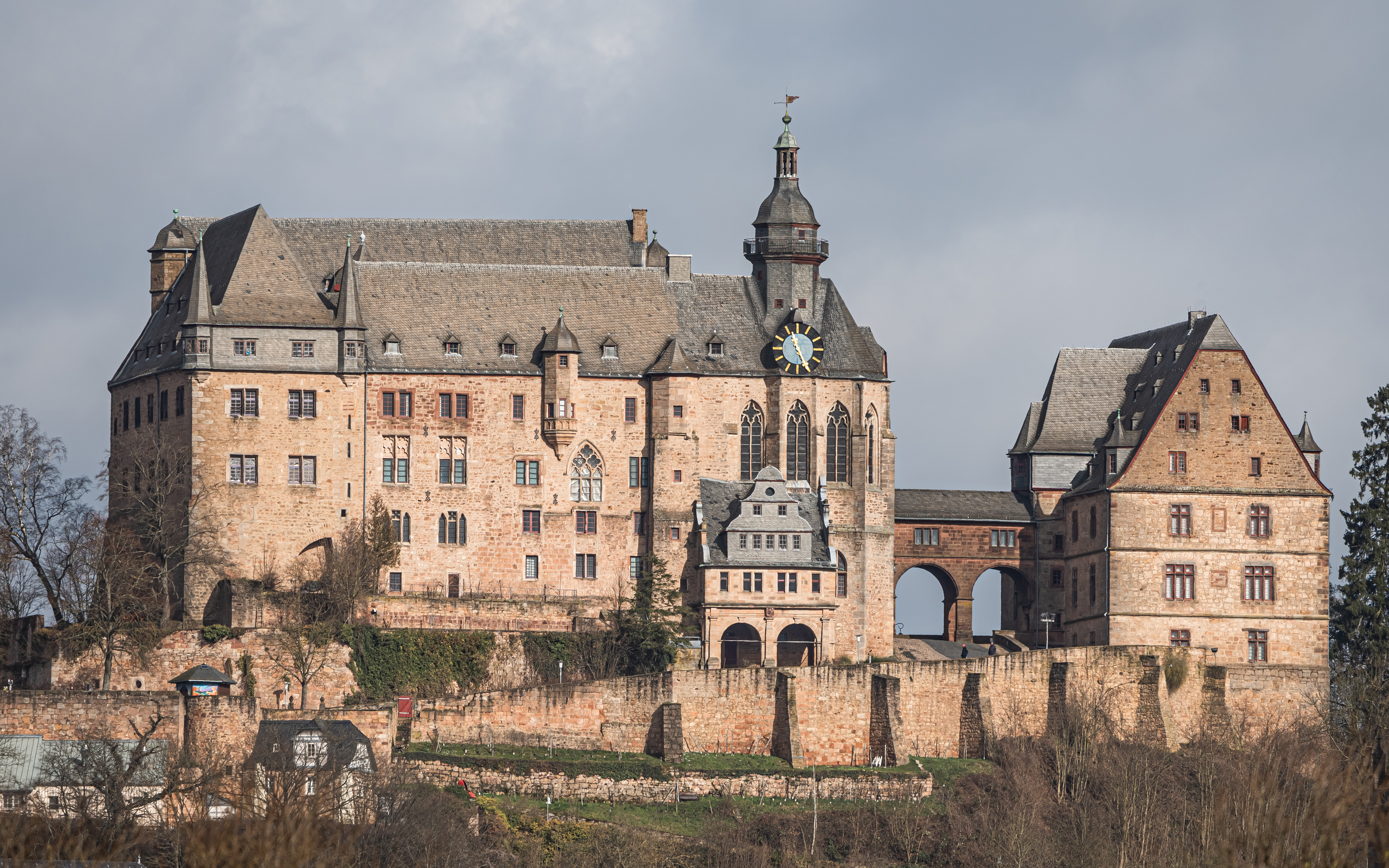
Southern view

The Marburger Schloss (or Marburg castle), also known as Landgrafenschloss Marburg, is a castle in Marburg, Hesse, Germany, located on top of Schlossberg (287 m NAP). Built in the 11th century as a fort, it became the first residence of Landgraviate of Hesse (HRE). The Marburg Colloquy was held here in 1529.

Today the building is used as a museum (Marburger Universitätsmuseum für Kulturgeschichte, Wilhelmsbau, since 1981) and as an event site.

== Location ==
The castle is located West of Marburg, Hesse, Germany, on top of Schlossberg ("Castle Hill").

== History of the building ==
In 1945, the Marburg Files were compiled at Marburg Castle.

== See also ==
- List of castles in Hesse

== Literature ==
- Elmar Brohl, Waltraud Brohl: Geschützturm – Barbakane – Rondell – Ravelin. In: Burgenforschung in Hessen. Begleitband zur Ausstellung im Marburger Landgrafenschloß vom 1. November 1996 – 2. Februar 1997. Kleine Schriften aus dem Vorgeschichtlichen Seminar Marburg. Bd. 46. Marburg 1996, S. 183–201, ISBN 3-8185-0219-6
- Elmar Brohl: Sicherungs- und Wiederherstellungsmaßnahmen an der Festung Marburg. In: Denkmalpflege und Kulturgeschichte. Wiesbaden 1999, 2, S. 2–9, ISSN 1436-168X
- Dieter Großmann: Das Schloß zu Marburg an der Lahn. Mit Ergänzungen von G. Ulrich Großmann. DKV-Kunstführer Nr. 366/9, 4., veränderte Auflage, Deutscher Kunstverlag, München, Berlin 1999, (keine ISBN).
- G. Ulrich Grossmann: Schloss Marburg. Burgen, Schlösser und Wehrbauten in Mitteleuropa. Bd. 3. Regensburg 1999, ISBN 3-7954-1218-8
