= For Us, the Living =

2003 novel by Robert A. Heinlein

For Us, the Living: A Comedy of Customs
- First edition cover
- Author: Robert A. Heinlein
- Language: English
- Genre: Science fiction
- Publisher: Scribner
- Publication date: November 28, 2003
- Publication place: United States
- Media type: Print (hardback & paperback)
- Pages: 288 (first edition, hardback)
- ISBN: 0-7432-5998-X (first edition, hardback)
- OCLC: 53145408
- Dewey Decimal: 813/.54 22
- LC Class: PS3515.E288 F67 2004

For Us, the Living: A Comedy of Customs is a science fiction novel by American writer Robert A. Heinlein. It was written in 1938 and published for the first time in 2003. Heinlein admirer and science fiction author Spider Robinson titled his introductory essay "RAH DNA", as he believes this first, unpublished novel formed the DNA of Heinlein's later works.

The novel's manuscript was lost until biographer Robert James traced down references to it. His research led to its rediscovery in a box left in a garage. Heinlein had apparently sent it to an earlier biographer, Leon Stover.

== Plot summary ==
Perry Nelson, a normal 1939 engineer and Navy pilot, is driving his automobile when he has a blowout, skids over a cliff, and wakes up in the year 2086. Though he was apparently killed in the summer, he re-appears in extremely cold snow, nearly dies again by freezing, and is saved by a fur-clad woman named Diana. The exact circumstances of his being killed and reborn after a century and a half are never explained.

The later 21st century people seem strangely incurious, showing little interest in how he had come to be among them and rather take his appearance for granted and proceed to explain to him the details of the social and political set-up of their world.

== Background ==
The book is akin more to a lecture series than a novel. A number of people have remarked on its resemblance to H. G. Wells' The Shape of Things to Come where the sleeper wakes into pseudo-utopia. The character Diana's background is clarified in a multiple-page footnote from the author. The future society has a version of a Social Credit structure with a central government-run bank exclusively controlling the monetary supply to prevent overproduction and remaining private banks prohibited from lending money they do not actually have on hand and which not had been explicitly designated for investment risk.

The book does not tell precisely how the protagonist came to wake up a century and a half after being killed in a car accident, and find himself wandering in the snow in the body of a denizen of the future who had had enough of life and chose to commit suicide. It is mentioned that his last sight before crashing down and getting killed was a girl in a green bathing suit who had the same face as the Diana which he meets in the future; it turns out that her name had been Diana, too, and that to her fell the disagreeable task of finding Perry's broken body and reporting the accident. There is the clear implication that the later Diana was an avatar or reincarnation of the earlier one, but this is not stated explicitly. As noted by reviewer Nancy Green, this aspect of the book gives the impression of a draft which Heinlein intended to further work on, but never did.

== Connections to other Heinlein works ==
Appearing already in this early stage of Heinlein's career is the fanatic and dictatorial religious leader Nehemiah Scudder. However, in Heinlein's later Future History Scudder succeeds in getting elected President and establishing a theocratic dictatorship dominating the U.S. for most of the 21st century. Conversely, in For Us, the Living, Scudder does establish for several years a de facto domination over the Mississippi Valley, and terrorizes much of the rest of the country by Ku Klux Klan–type thugs—but he is stopped at the last moment by the counter-mobilization of libertarians, and despite mass voter intimidation carries only Tennessee and Alabama.

In fact, the new regime seen in full bloom in the book's 2086 came into being in direct reaction to Scudder's attempt to impose Puritanical mores on the entire American society—for example, the complete abolition of the nudity taboo, which is an important aspect of the book's plot.

The abolition of the taboo on public nudity would re-appear as a major issue in Heinlein's The Puppet Masters—though under radically different circumstances to those in the present book.

A major difference between the time line of For Us, the Living and Heinlein's later Future History is the time when space exploration begins. In the Future History, Heinlein assumed that long before the end of the 20th century an extensive human exploration and colonization would take place all over the Solar System; the same assumption was made also in other works not fitting into the Future History's framework. However, in his earlier book dealt with here, Heinlein was far more cautious, placing the first circumlunar flight (not yet an actual landing) only in 2089.

Ward Carson wrote: "In For Us, the Living, space colonization waits until the end of the Twenty-First Century and Scudder is defeated; in the Future History it happens a century earlier and Scudder takes over the US. Heinlein made no explicit remark on this, but a causal connection could be made: in the Future History the bold individualistic Americans emigrated into space at the end of the Twentieth Century, and were not present in America to stop it from falling into the fanatic's hands".

A brief summary is given of David Lamb, whose tale is fully developed in Time Enough For Love as "The Man Who Was Too Lazy to Fail".

== Concepts and themes ==
=== The Second World War ===
At the time of writing, there was already a widespread expectation of a new war breaking out in Europe in the near future, and Heinlein followed this assumption. However, in the book's timeline the US stays out of the war, and it ends due to Germany's economic collapse rather than its military defeat (similar to the scenario given in H. G. Wells' The Shape of Things to Come, four years before). Heinlein did correctly guess that Adolf Hitler would end up committing suicide, once his schemes of conquest collapsed.

The timeline depicted in the book does not include a war between the US and Japan. However, in the context of a later war there is a depiction of Latin American aircraft carriers launching a devastating surprise attack on New York City, which bears some similarities to the methods which the Japanese would use at Pearl Harbor three years after the book was written. Heinlein, a former naval officer, clearly understood the strategic implications of the carriers' appearance and the revolution they would bring to naval warfare.

The recently abdicated King Edward VIII of the UK is very positively presented, his romantic image as "the King who gave up his throne for love" not yet, at the time of writing, tainted by pro-Nazi associations. In Heinlein's projected future, Edward returns to England at the outbreak of war and distinguishes himself in wartime service. After the war a European Federation is formed and Edward is made into a Constitutional Emperor of Europe, a task which he fulfills with great success. However, he dies without issue in 1970 (two years earlier than in actual history) and in the aftermath Europe is torn up in forty years of highly destructive war and is largely depopulated.

=== Secularism ===
As could be expected of a regime born directly of secular opposition to a religious fanatic's violent attempt to set up a theocracy, the regime depicted in the book has a clearly secularist inclination. All organized religious groups are defined as "sects", including what were considered "Churches" at the time of writing (and still are at present). Such religious themes as "the conspicuous depiction of a person suffering in great pain" (i.e. a crucifix) or the "wild aggressive behavior of ancient barbaric tribes" (i.e. the ancient Hebrews as depicted in the Hebrew Bible/Old Testament) are greatly frowned upon. While religious education is not outright forbidden, all youths typically undergo a minimum of two years at a "development center" (a kind of boarding school) where education is completely secular. An option for parents refusing to let their children have such an experience is to go to Coventry where they could do as they wish, and some "sects" have done exactly that, to their last member.

In this, Heinlein's vision of the future could be considered a watered-down version of that in Wells's The Shape of Things to Come where determined reformers completely suppress all organized religion for the explicit purpose of gaining a complete monopoly over education.

=== President Roosevelt ===
The book—written in the aftermath of the Democrats' heavy losses in the 1938 mid-term elections—assumes that by 1938–39 Franklin D. Roosevelt's New Deal had failed due to the constant attacks by his opponents, that in the 1940 election, Roosevelt would prove unelectable, that his downfall would drag the Democratic Party to ruin and that a sharp drift to the Right would culminate in an extreme-right dictatorship in the late 1940s—which would, however, prove short-lived and after which the pendulum would swing sharply to the Left again.

Heinlein assigned to Fiorello H. La Guardia—at the time of writing a reformer Mayor of New York and outspoken supporter of Roosevelt, despite being nominally a Republican—the role of picking up FDR's torch, as a militant reforming President in the 1950s who would lead a head-on confrontation with the banking system, effectively nationalize the banks and institute the system of Social Credit.

Several decades later, a John Delano Roosevelt is mentioned among the six highly regarded reformers who revise the US Constitution and institute the new regime seen in 2086.

=== Economic independence ===
At a number of points in For Us, the Living, Heinlein describes an environment in which individuals are able to choose whether or not to accept a job. Passing references are made to the large number of individuals who take up art or other careers that traditionally do not pay well. The book also points out the short working hours and high wages paid to employees. The book ascribes this flexible working environment to the social credit system (the "Dividend") adopted by the United States which provides enough new capital in the economic system to overcome the problems of overproduction while providing a guaranteed minimal income for all members of society.

For Us, the Living also depicts an early example of homesourcing in fiction. The character of Diana, a nationally renowned dancer, is shown performing in her own home for a broadcast audience, which sees her dancing on sets added by the broadcasting company to her original feed. The mechanism for this homesourcing is not described in much technical detail, but it appears to be similar to a high-definition video signal interfaced with something like modern chroma key technology.

The biggest economic impact in the book, however, is Heinlein's Social Credit system, that he takes many pains to explain: the Heritage Check System, an alternative form of government funding, in place of taxation. The heritage check system is a moderately altered Social Credit system. Its modification reflects Heinlein's more libertarian views and Heinlein's interpretation on how financial systems are affected by the relationship between consumption and production.

The system could be construed as a libertarian's approach to a socialist idea, creating an alternative to a tax system that puts fewer requirements on individuals, while simultaneously providing more for the common welfare. This is not too surprising, as Heinlein (a proclaimed libertarian) was also fascinated by the Social Credit plan that appeared in Canada in the 1930s. In this role, the government becomes less a part of the economy and more a facilitator of it.

The Heritage System in For Us, the Living can be summarized by four major actions:

1. A required end to fractional reserve banking. Banks must always have a 100% reserve for any loan they give out.
2. New money is printed only by the government, and then, only enough to counteract the natural deflation that would occur in a system without fractional reserve banking.
3. The government uses this money (and only this money), divided among all of its necessary roles. Any extra is divided evenly among citizens and businesses that over-produce, to offset the loss of not selling their over-production (the government buying the over-production for its own use, which can be bought by citizens later if they so desire at the same price.)
4. Goods bought by the government are later sold by the government (or used by it), and normal governmental services (such as postage) are sold. These goods and services provide the standard backing for the currency, similar to how gold is used to back the gold standard.

Dealing with government funding in this way is theorized to stabilize an economy, and deals with the production/consumption problem that Heinlein claims to exist with more conventional economic systems:

A production cycle creates exactly enough purchasing power for its consumption cycle. If any part of this potential purchasing is not used for consumption but instead is invested in new production, it appears as a cost charge in the new items of production, before it re-appears as new purchasing power. Therefore, it causes a net loss of purchasing power in the earlier cycle. Therefore, an equal amount of new money is required by the country.

In addition to stabilizing the economy, it is theorized to have the added benefit of being a system where Federal taxes would not be needed for Government function, and only be needed for regulatory measures (e.g. enforcing environmental standards, corporations being taxed for not meeting government requirements, tariffs that exist purely to discourage buying from certain locations, wealth redistribution, etc.)

The system also makes note of the fact that government spending and government taxing are not only not related, both can happen in the complete absence of the other (especially in a heritage check system), and that as far as market effect, taxing causes deflation and Government spending causes inflation. He notes this, and that as a result, the value of money can be completely and totally controlled, making the currency as stable as it is desired to be.

=== Social and governmental ===
For Us, the Living also depicts graphically the transition between the society that Perry left in 1939 and how it is transformed through a series of acts by the Government. Of specific note is the "War Voting Act". In this act, if the United States wished to engage in armed conflict with any other country, a national referendum was required to be held. Voting on a war is limited to citizens eligible for military service and not currently in the military. In the event that the article was passed and the country was to go to war, those who had voted for war were the first to be enlisted in the armed forces, those who did not vote were the second group conscripted, and those who voted "No" were the third group. Heinlein states that in the history of the "War Voting Act", the process had been enacted three times, and all three times the entire citizenry were actively engaged in very vocal debate as to whether the conflict was warranted. All three times, he states, the measures to go to war were defeated.

After the transition has been completed, the social norms of the society are effectively transformed. One of the most pervasive, is the distinction between "public sphere" and "private sphere". The society as a whole respects privacy in what are considered private sphere events, such as intimacy, closeness, interpersonal relationships and even identity in business and governmental transactions. As there is a great deal of information in the society, this becomes rather critical in moving the society toward a point away from information fetishism and toward a society where persons have respect for one another's privacy and work as a society for the betterment of all.

=== Feminist critique ===
Cynthia Brown noted in her review that

(...) Heinlein depicts a society where it is taken for granted that a woman may freely pursue a career, as well as choose her sexual partner(s) and live openly with a man without need of any sanction by a religious or secular authority. Already many decades before 2086, we live in such a society, and tend to forget that in 1939 when the book was written this was still quite a radical vision, and that this may well have been a major reason for publishers to reject it. We have not yet gotten to the point where possessiveness over another person and the use of even "mild" violence in pursuit of such possessiveness is regarded by society at large as an intolerable social and mental aberration; perhaps by 2086 we will get there, too.

(...) Still, Heinlein was far from completely and unequivocally accepting the full implications of gender equality—neither in this book nor in his later written and earlier published ones. The retrograde side raises its head in the later part, dealing with Heinlein's pet subject of space exploration. The protagonist Perry, who can be said to stand for Heinlein himself, is astonished at seeing a woman about to take up an experimental rocket, and exclaims: "But that's man's work!". He does not get told—as might have been expected—that the utopian society of 2086 has long since abolished any such distinction as "man's work". Rather, his interlocutor lamely explains that this particular woman, Vivian, was given a special privilege because she had designed the fuel for the rocket. A few pages later, the rocket crashes and Vivian is very severely punished for trying her hand at "a man's work": she was "burned to a crisp" and lost her right leg, and Heinlein neglects to tell the reader whether or not the doctors managed to save her life. It is left to the male hero from the past to take up the mission to which the poor Vivian was not equal, design a new and better rocket fuel (with his engineering knowledge a century out of date?) and proceed to triumphantly take off to "Where no man had gone before". To Perry's two love interests, Diana and Olga, is left the ultra-traditional female role, to tearfully embrace and kiss their hero and then wait fretting at home for his safe return—and to this reviewer is left a quite nasty aftertaste from the ending which followed a rather promising prelude.

— Cynthia Brown

== Editions ==
- January 2004, Scribner Book Company, ISBN 5-551-28585-5
- January 2004, Scribner Book Company, ISBN 5-551-28586-3
- January 6, 2004, Scribner, hardcover, 288 pages, ISBN 0-7432-5998-X
- December 1, 2004, Pocket Books, paperback, 352 pages, ISBN 0-7434-9154-8
