= Marburg Files =

Top-secret documents from Nazi Germany

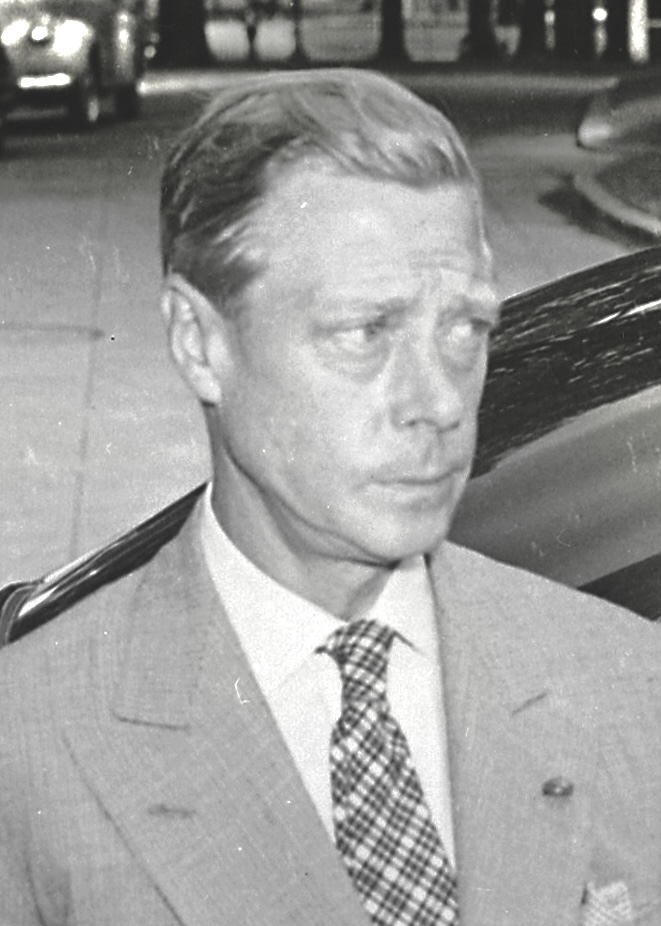
The Duke of Windsor, formerly Edward VIII, 1945

The Marburg Files, also known as the Windsor Files or Duke of Windsor Files, are a series of documents discovered in Germany during May 1945 near the Harz Mountains and compiled at Marburg Castle, Hesse. The files are alleged to have detailed a 1940 Nazi plot titled Operation Willi, attempting to persuade the Duke of Windsor to side with the Nazis in a bid to bring the United Kingdom into peace negotiations. The files were sent to the United Kingdom, where they were suppressed from public knowledge for many years.

== Discovery ==
As American troops were traveling through the outskirts of Degenershausen Estate, they found large numbers of abandoned or destroyed German military vehicles scattered along the side roads, with some containing various archives from the Nazi government. First Lieutenant David D. Silberberg initially discovered documents signed by the foreign minister of Nazi Germany, Joachim von Ribbentrop, and returned to Degenershausen to further study the background of his findings. After being advised of the locations of Meisdorf House and Marburg Castle, he escorted intelligence officers to the sites where a number of additional items were discovered. During this time, American troops arrested a German soldier named Karl von Loesch, an assistant to Hitler's personal translator Paul-Otto Schmidt, as he was retreating from Treffurt, near Eisenach. Schmidt had instructed him to destroy all the top-secret papers which he had placed in archives. Von Loesch destroyed the majority, but privately decided to keep some, and interred them in the grounds near the outskirts of Marburg. He was subsequently, by chance, introduced to Lieutenant-Colonel R. C. Thomson, chief of the British documents team, and offered to lead Thomson's team to the location of the buried correspondence in exchange for immunity from prosecution.

Around 400 tonnes of material were exhumed by the United States military and transported to Marburg Castle for review. Upon inspection, at least 60 documents appeared to contain correspondence between the Duke of Windsor and the Nazi German high command. American diplomats examined the contents before relaying a mix of original drafts and replicas to the British government. UK Prime Minister Winston Churchill discussed the files with King George VI, who insisted the files be suppressed and never released to the public. The entire collection was sent to the United Kingdom in 1948 and housed at Whaddon Hall, Buckinghamshire.

== Contents ==
The papers and correspondence discovered are alleged to have further detailed a plot by the Nazis, titled Operation Willi and orchestrated in 1940, to persuade the Duke of Windsor to officially join sides with the Nazis and move him to Germany in a bid to bring the UK to peace negotiations. It proposed convincing the Duke of a fictitious plot by King George VI and Prime Minister Winston Churchill to have him assassinated upon his arrival in The Bahamas, and conspiring with him to stage a kidnapping in the hope of blackmailing the monarchy and the UK into surrender. The papers are also alleged to reveal a plan to reinstate the Duke as king and recognise his wife, Wallis Simpson, as queen, in exchange for Nazi forces being given free movement across Europe.

Documents considered the most damning for the British royal family were among his final communications with the Nazis before his departure to the Bahamas, in which it has been alleged the Duke encouraged relentless bombing attacks on the United Kingdom in a bid to force the British government to begin peace negotiations. There is not believed to be any form of evidence that the Duke accepted any terms offered by the Nazis in a bid to co-operate with Operation Willi, with historians stating he was initially more impressed by the encouragement he had from the British government to become Governor of the Bahamas, but some documents are alleged to confirm he sympathised with Nazi ideologies.

== Release ==
Margaret Lambert, Maurice Baumont and Paul Sweet were the British, French and American historians and editors involved in examining the documents together from 1946. A small batch was released in 1954, before the entire volume was forced into publication in 1957 with further files released in 1996 at the Public Record Office in Kew. The release of the files was reported to have caused the Duke considerable annoyance.

== In popular culture ==
The Marburg Files are the main subject and focus of the episode "Vergangenheit" ("Past") of the Netflix television series The Crown, which depicts Queen Elizabeth II's initial review of the documents. The episode's director Philippa Lowthorpe stated that replicas of genuine files were used during filming. Despite confirming that Queen Elizabeth did condemn the Duke, historian Hugo Vickers has suggested that the episode falsely implies that the Duke was banished from the royal family upon release of the Marburg Files. He remained in contact with his family and public appearances continued.

== See also ==
- Abdication of Edward VIII
- Cultural depictions of Edward VIII of the United Kingdom
- The Blitz

== Bibliography ==
- Bloch, Michael (1982). The Duke of Windsor's War. London: Weidenfeld and Nicolson. ISBN 0-297-77947-8.
- Morton, Andrew (2015). 17 Carnations: The Windsors, the Nazis and the Cover-up. London: Michael O'Mara. ISBN 978-1-782-43456-6.
