= Portrait of Wallis, Duchess of Windsor =

1939 painting by Gerald Brockhurst

- Artist: Gerald Brockhurst
- Completion date: 1939
- Medium: Oil on canvas
- Dimensions: 101.6 cm × 81.3 cm (40.0 in × 32.0 in)
- Location: National Portrait Gallery, London

Portrait of Wallis, Duchess of Windsor is an oil-on-canvas painting by Gerald Brockhurst. It is part of the collection of the National Portrait Gallery (NPG) in London. The painting depicts the Duchess of Windsor, wife of the former Edward VIII who abdicated the throne to marry her.

Throughout the 1930s Brockhurst continued an increasingly successful career as a portrait artist, with notable sitters including the film stars Merle Oberon and Marlene Dietrich. He was a fan of Wallis's style and asked for permission to work on a painting of her. The portrait was eventually commissioned by Wallis and Brockhurst began working on it in his London studio. It hung in the library of Villa Windsor, the couple's home in Paris, and now is in the possession of the National Portrait Gallery, London, who purchased it with help from the National Lottery Heritage Fund in 1998. In it, Wallis is depicted wearing a Mainbocher blouse and a bouquet brooch by Van Cleef & Arpels which had been a gift from Edward.
