= Edna Deane =

English professional ballroom dancer

- Born: Edna Morton Sewell; 15 October 1905; Witsies Hoek, Orange River Colony
- Died: 22 November 1995 (aged 90); Rottingdean, East Sussex, England
- Occupations: author, choreographer, dancer
- Years active: 1917–1935
- Spouses: James Trevor Kendal (m. 1935; div. 1946) John Fuelling (m. 1950; died 1980)
- Children: 1
- Career
- Dances: Ballroom, foxtrot

Edna Morton Deane (née Sewell; 15 October 1905 – 22 November 1995) was an English professional ballroom dancer, author and choreographer who won the British and world ballroom dancing championships. She co-founded the Deane School of Dance and Drama and earned fame for being asked by the future Edward VIII for a dance nine times at a ball in the mid-1920s, which inspired the writing of the popular song "I've danced with a man, who's danced with a girl, who's danced with the Prince of Wales".

== Early life ==
Deane was born Edna Morton Sewell at Witsies Hoek in the Orange River Colony on 15 October 1905. She was the oldest daughter of English parents; her father, Percival George Sewell, later became an accountant for Harrods, and her mother, Anne St Leger Bradley, was a professional pianist who went by the name Dorothy Deane. Deane had two younger sisters, Dorothy and Eileen. The family returned to England in 1907, and Deane studied classical ballet under the tutelage of Marie Rambert, Greek dancing with Olive Ripman and Josephine Bradley taught her ballroom dancing.

== Career ==
Deane debuted at the professional level at the age of 12 as part of a dancing trio called The Sunshine Babies with her younger sisters. They toured at hotels situated in Piccadilly, Berkeley and Hyde Park. According to her obituary in The Times, Deane had become "one of London's leading dancers and as celebrated a figure as any film or stage star" by the mid-1920s, and one columnist called her 'the divine Edna'. During that period, the future Edward VIII had been so entranced by her, that he asked her to dance nine times at the Ascot Cabaret Ball. The event inspired the songwriter Herbert Farjeon to write the popular song "I've danced with a man, who's danced with a girl, who's danced with the Prince of Wales". Deane was reportedly unimpressed with the song due to the prince's dancing style.

Deane won the British foxtrot championship in 1929, and reached the height of her popularity in 1933, called her Annus mirabilis by The Times, when she and her partner Timothy Palmer won that year's British and world championships in ballroom dancing. The theatrical impresario George Black capitalised on her fame to introduce her as Edna Deane, the Queen of Dance, during a performance of the Crazy Gang at the London Palladium. She retired from dancing in 1935 and became a dance writer and choreographer. Deane authored a ballet poem, Boutique Fantasque, which was broadcast on BBC Radio, published a book Ballet to Remember in 1947, and wrote, directed, designed and choreographed several stage productions for young actors and dancers.

By that time, Deane, her mother, and sisters had founded the Deane School of Dance and Drama. Notable students included the actresses Hattie Jacques and Barbara Murray. Deane's stage productions include The Shepherd's Tale, which earned honours at the Sussex Drama Festival and Glyndebourne. She adapted the ballets Giselle and Coppélia into straight plays, and debuted her production at the Scala Theatre in 1956. Deane operated a boutique Tallboys 1780AD in Rottingdean between 1967 and 1979, and attracted customers such as the actress Anna Neagle, the playwright Enid Bagnold and Robin Maugham, the novelist.

== Personal life ==
She was married to the London barrister James Trevor Kendal from January 1935 to 1946 and then to the restaurant owner John Fuelling between 1950 and his death in 1980. Deane had a daughter from the second marriage. Her later years saw her affected by osteoporosis and confined to home. Deane attempted suicide by overdosing but was stopped from doing so by her daughter. She died on 22 November 1995 in Rottingdean.
