= I've danced with a man, who's danced with a girl, who's danced with the Prince of Wales =

1927 song by Herbert Farjeon and Harold Scott

Song
- Written: 1927
- Composer: Harold Scott
- Lyricist: Herbert Farjeon

"I've danced with a man, who's danced with a girl, who's danced with the Prince of Wales" is a 1927 song by Herbert Farjeon and Harold Scott written at the height of the popularity of Edward, Prince of Wales, later Edward VIII of the United Kingdom. It was inspired by a 1920s incident at the Ascot Cabaret Ball, at which Edward asked ballroom dancing champion Edna Deane to dance with him nine times.

== Background ==
Edward, Prince of Wales, was known to enjoy dancing, being both a patron and participant in many fund-raising dances and balls. He often asked women from the lower classes to dance with him, which increased his widespread popularity. According to Marriott in Downton Abbey: The Official Film Companion, women sought him out as a dancing partner and those who did share a dance with him earned instant celebrity.

In the mid-1920s, Edward attended the Ascot Cabaret Ball, which also saw the presence of Edna Deane, a ballroom dancing champion. Edward was reportedly "entranced" by Deane and asked her to dance with him nine times. This incident inspired songwriter Herbert Farjeon to write the song in 1927, using the title words in the chorus, which proclaims "Glory, Glory, Alleluia! I'm the luckiest of females; For I've danced with a man, who's danced with a girl, who's danced with the Prince of Wales."

== History ==
According to the Oxford Dictionary of Modern Quotations, Farjeon originally wrote the song for Elsa Lanchester, who sang it in a London music hall performance. Lanchester regarded the song as her greatest hit. The song was then sung at private parties. Its popularity also spread to the United States and Canada.

On 4 June 1928, the soprano Mimi Crawford sang it in the London revue Many Happy Returns—also written by Farjeon—at the Duke of York's Theatre. Several weeks earlier, the revue was privately staged at the Arts Theatre. Although this performance was not subject to censorship by the Lord Chamberlain's office, the Prince of Wales was a member of the Arts Theatre Club and the theatre's managing director therefore opted to submit the tune to the prince's secretary for his approval. The prince—said to be "a good sport" with "a very good sense of humour"—gave his verbal assent. The song was subsequently sent to the Lord Chamberlain for his approval before the public performance at the Duke of York's Theatre, and was approved without comment.

The song was later chosen as the theme for the 1978 ITV television series Edward & Mrs. Simpson, scored by Ron Grainer.

== Legacy ==
The song's title lyric is often quoted in the contemporary press, typically referencing the desire of ordinary people to forge connections with famous individuals. In 2009 the journalist Tom Sutcliffe of The Independent quoted the lyric in the context of how an "exotic threat" like the swine flu epidemic suddenly came closer to home.
