= Operation Willi =

German attempt to kidnap Edward, Duke of Windsor in July 1940

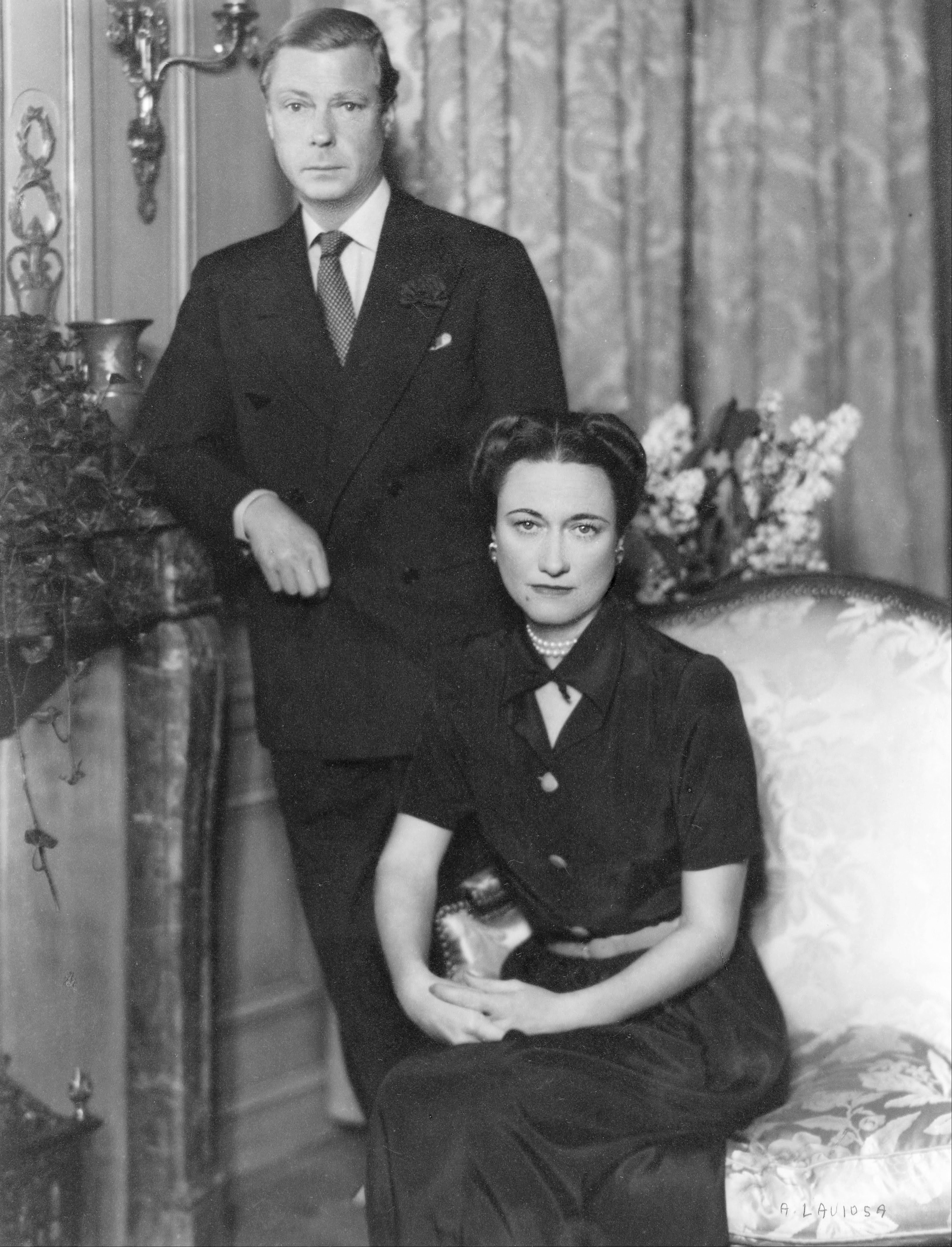
The future Edward VIII and Wallis Simpson in 1934. They were married in June 1937.

Operation Willi (German: Unternehmen Willi, pronounced [ˈvɪli]) was the German code name for the unsuccessful attempt by the SS to kidnap Prince Edward, Duke of Windsor in July 1940 and induce him to work with German dictator Adolf Hitler for either a peace settlement with Britain, or a restoration to the throne after the German conquest of the United Kingdom.

== Background ==
Edward, the son of George V, assumed the throne in January 1936, when his father died. But it was already clear by then that he wanted to marry the American Wallis Simpson, and, since the Church of England proscribed marriages for divorced people whose former spouse was still living, he stunned the world by abdicating his throne less than a year later in favour of his brother Albert, the Duke of York, who became George VI.

The ex-king and Mrs. Simpson were married in France and, as the Duke and Duchess of Windsor, toured Nazi Germany in October 1937 as personal guests of Adolf Hitler, fanning speculations that they were sympathetic to Nazism. The trip was paid for by the Nazi government, which believed that the duke was a potential ally.

In Germany, "they were treated like royalty ... members of the aristocracy would bow and curtsy towards her, and she was treated with all the dignity and status that the duke always wanted," according to royal biographer Andrew Morton, quoted by BBC News. The Duke admired the economic achievements of the nazist regime, such as the reduction in unemployment. His biographers later said that "the worst that could be said about his visit is that he closed his eyes to much of what he did not want to see".

When World War II broke out in September 1939, the Duke became liaison officer with the British military mission to the French Army High Command. He served as an agent for British military intelligence, which wanted information on French defences: specifically, the Maginot Line. His reports gave a very accurate assessment of French unpreparedness, but they were ignored.

After the fall of France in June 1940, the Windsors made their way to neutral Spain through Biarritz to escape capture by the Germans.

== Beginnings of a plot ==
On June 23rd, the German ambassador to Madrid, Eberhard von Stohrer, telegraphed Joachim von Ribbentrop, the Nazi Foreign Minister, that the Spanish Foreign Minister, Colonel Juan Beigbeder y Atienza, was inquiring on how to deal with the Duke, who was on his way to Lisbon, with the possibility of detaining him.

Ribbentrop instructed von Stohrer the following day to forward the suggestion that the Duke and Duchess be detained for two weeks, but not let it appear that the suggestion came from him. Stohrer replied that Beigbeder would do as Ribbentrop asked. The Spanish Foreign Minister then wired Ribbentrop on July 2nd that he met with the Duke and reported the Duke's alleged antagonism against the Royal Family due to the treatment meted to his wife, as well as criticising Winston Churchill and his wartime policies.

The Windsors then proceeded to Lisbon, where they arrived on July 3rd. The British government got wind of the Duke's alleged indiscreet remarks with Beigbeder, and as a result Churchill sent the Duke a telegram, ordering him back to Britain. Churchill pointed out that the Duke was under military authority, and unless he obeyed, he would be subjected to a court-martial. (The Duke had the temporary rank of major general.) Then came another telegram designating him as Governor of the Bahamas and ordering him to assume this post at once. Nevertheless, the Windsors stayed a month in the villa of Ricardo do Espirito Santo Silva, a banker (Banco Espírito Santo) said to have pro-Nazi sympathies.

The German minister to Lisbon, Baron Oswald von Hoyningen-Huene, reported this to Ribbentrop on 11 July and added that the Duke "intends to postpone his departure as long as possible... in hope of a turn of events favourable to him," and basically reiterated what was reported by Minister Beigbeder.

Ribbentrop took this as an encouraging sign, and cabled the German embassy in Madrid to try to prevent the Duke from going to the Bahamas by being brought back to Spain — preferably by his Spanish friends — and be persuaded, even compelled, to remain in Spanish territory. He further intimated that the "British Secret Service" was going "to do away" with the Duke as soon as he arrived in the Bahamas.

== The emissary ==
The next day, 12 July, von Stohrer saw Ramón Serrano Súñer, Spanish Minister of the Interior, who promised to get his brother-in-law Generalissimo Francisco Franco in on the plot and carry out the following plan: the Spanish government would send a friend of the Duke, Miguel Primo de Rivera, leader of the Falange and son of Miguel Primo de Rivera, a former dictator, as an emissary. Rivera would invite the Duke to Spain for a hunting trip and also to discuss Anglo-Spanish relations. There he would also be informed of the "plot" by the British secret-service to liquidate him. If the Duke would agree to stay, he would be given financial assistance to permit him in maintaining a lifestyle befitting his station. (Reportedly 50 million Swiss francs were set aside for this.)

Rivera agreed to the task, although he was not told of German involvement in this. He visited the Windsors on 16 July and presented the offer to the Duke; while he was receptive to the offer, the Duke also expressed reservations for several reasons, not least of which were the telegrams from the British government urging him to leave for the Bahamas. Another visit on 22 July gave similar results.

It was during the time of the last visit by Rivera that the Nazis were drawing up the plan to kidnap the Windsors. Hitler personally assigned Walter Schellenberg to handle the operation.

== Schellenberg's role ==
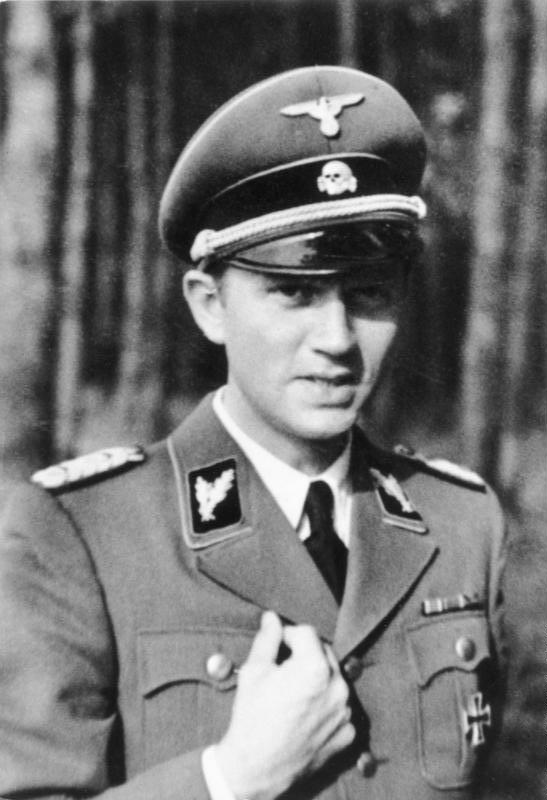
Walter Schellenberg

Schellenberg, who was awarded the Iron Cross for his role in the Venlo Incident the year before, flew from Berlin to Madrid, conferred with von Stohrer, then went on to Portugal to begin work. The final plan would be to entice the Windsors over the border to Spain (with the collusion of cooperative border officials, since they did not have passports) and keep them there to "protect them from plotters against their lives, specifically the British Intelligence Service".

He carried out scare tactics to induce the Duke's willingness to leave the villa while trying to pin the blame on the British. Schellenberg arranged for some stone-throwing against the windows of the villa while circulating rumours among the servants that the British were responsible. A bouquet of flowers was also sent to the Duchess warning her of "the machinations of the British intelligence service". Another scare tactic, the firing of shots resulting in the harmless breaking of the windows, scheduled for 30 July, was not carried out due to possible psychological effects on the Duchess.

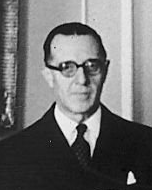
Sir Walter Monckton

On that same day, Schellenberg reported that Sir Walter Monckton, an old friend of the Duke, had arrived, evidently charged by the British government to speed the Windsors toward the Bahamas as soon as possible. Moreover, the German ambassador reported that the Windsors would be leaving on 1 August for the small British possession. According to Schellenberg in his memoirs, when Hitler learned of this, he urged Schellenberg to take away all pretence and abduct them outright.

== Failure of the plot ==
Even while the Spanish ambassador to Lisbon was prevailed upon to make a last-minute appeal to the Windsors, the automobile carrying the ducal baggage was "sabotaged", according to Schellenberg, so the luggage arrived at the port late. A bomb threat on the liner Excalibur was also spread by the Germans, which further delayed its departure while Portuguese officials searched the ship.

Nevertheless, the Windsors departed that evening. While Schellenberg blamed the failure of the plot on Monckton, the collapse of the Spanish plan and the alleged "English mentality" of the Duke, it was also probable that Schellenberg deliberately refused to carry out the plan, which seemed doomed from the start. Even he admitted in his memoirs that his role in the affair was a ridiculous one.

== Suspicions of pro-Nazi sentiment ==
Many historians have suggested that Hitler was prepared to reinstate the Duke of Windsor as king in the hope of establishing a fascist Britain, had Edward agreed to do so after reaching Spain. Documents recovered from the Germans in 1945 near Marburg, later called the Marburg Files as well as The Windsor Files, included relevant correspondence about the planned outcome of Operation Willi. A telegram from Joachim von Ribbentrop indicated that the Duke of Windsor would be offered the throne of the United Kingdom (as a puppet king) if the Operation succeeded and Edward reached Spain. Another telegram indicates that the plan to reinstate the Duke as king had been discussed with the Duke and Duchess:

"Both seem to be completely bound up in formalistic ways of thought since they replied that according to the British constitution this was not possible after abdication ... When [an] agent then remarked the course of war may produce changes even in the British constitution, the Duchess in particular became very thoughtful."

The Duke was appointed to the Bahamas post in 1940 as a means of removing him from Europe, as his ties with the Nazis "made him a liability", according to royal historian Carolyn Harris.

== See also ==
- Cultural depictions of Edward VIII of the United Kingdom
