= Edward & Mrs. Simpson =

1978 British television series

- DVD cover
- Written by: Frances Donaldson; Simon Raven
- Directed by: Waris Hussein
- Starring: Peggy Ashcroft; Maurice Denham; Edward Fox; Marius Goring; Cynthia Harris; Nigel Hawthorne; Charles Keating; Cherie Lunghi; Kika Markham; Jessie Matthews; Andrew Ray; John Shrapnel; David Waller
- Theme music composer: Ron Grainer
- Country of origin: United Kingdom
- Original language: English

Production
- Producer: Andrew Brown

Original release
- Network: ITV
- Release: 6 November – 20 December 1978

Edward & Mrs. Simpson is a seven-part British television series that dramatises the events leading to the 1936 abdication of King Edward VIII, who gave up his throne to marry the twice-divorced American Wallis Simpson.

The series, made by Thames Television for ITV, was originally broadcast in 1978. Edward Fox played Edward, and Cynthia Harris portrayed Mrs. Simpson. The series was scripted by Simon Raven, based on Fox's maternal aunt Frances Donaldson's biography of the King, Edward VIII. It was produced by Andrew Brown, overseen by the Head of Drama at Thames Television Verity Lambert and directed by Waris Hussein. The incidental music was by Ron Grainer.

The series, broadcast in the US in 1979 as instalments of the nationally syndicated Mobil Showcase Network, won the 1980 Emmy Award for Outstanding Limited Series, and BAFTA Awards in 1979 for Best Actor, Best Design, Best Costume Design, and Best Series or Serial. It has been released on DVD in Region 2 (UK) by Network, and in Region 1 (United States) by A&E.

== Episodes ==
1. "The Little Prince": Edward's life in the 1920s as Prince of Wales, his romances with Freda Dudley Ward and Lady Furness, his introduction to Mr. and Mrs. Ernest Simpson. There is a slight historical query as the first official meeting of Edward and Mrs Simpson took place at Burrough Court near Melton Mowbray, Leicestershire, on Saturday 10 January 1931. The episode suggests a short meeting took place at the London residence of Lady Furness in the autumn of 1930 (which is not documented and therefore cannot be proved).
2. "Venus at the Prow": The romance between Edward and Mrs. Simpson develops, with regular weekends at his country home Fort Belvedere outside London near Windsor.
3. "The New King": Edward succeeds to the throne on the death of his father, King George V, in January 1936, and asks Mrs. Simpson to marry him. Mr. Simpson agrees to a divorce. The King, Mrs. Simpson, and friends cruise the Mediterranean, an event widely reported by the press outside Britain. Mrs Simpson is invited to Balmoral Castle, which causes difficulties with Edward's brother Bertie and his wife Elizabeth.
4. "The Divorce": Edward convinces Mrs. Simpson to go forward with her divorce; she would then be free to marry him and be crowned Queen at the coronation scheduled for May 1937. The King and the government pressure the British press to maintain silence about the King's romance, but news dribbles into Britain and gossip abounds.
5. "The Decision": Edward is warned that British press silence about his 'friendship' with Mrs. Simpson is about to be broken. The King tells the royal family and the Prime Minister that he intends to marry Wallis Simpson, and will abdicate if he cannot do so as King.
6. "Proposals": Attempts are made to resolve the problem without Edward abdicating, including a proposal put forth by the King for a morganatic marriage with Wallis Simpson. The British and Dominion governments oppose the marriage in any form.
7. "The Abdication": The final days of Edward as King as attempts to gain more time are undercut by Edward himself. The signing of the Deed of Abdication on 10 December 1936 at Fort Belvedere. The radio broadcast to the nation on 11 December 1936 from the Augusta Tower, Windsor Castle. Edward's exile sailing on HMS Fury from Portsmouth. The marriage of Edward and Mrs Simpson on 3 June 1937.

== Music ==
In 1978, RK Records released an official soundtrack album (UK cat No: RKLP 5003). It had 12 tracks, some composed or arranged by Ron Grainer and all played by his orchestra. The track listing is as follows:

Side one

1. "I've Danced with a Man" (Herbert Farjeon)
2. "The Very Thought of You" (Ray Noble)
3. "A Room with a View" (Noël Coward)
4. "If I Had You" (Al Bowlly)
5. "Of Cabbages and Kings"
6. "Bring Down the Curtain"

Side two

1. "One More Dance"
2. "Dance Little Lady" (Coward)
3. "Tango"
4. "When Love Grows Cold"
5. "Rumours in the Wind"
6. "I've Danced with a Man" (End Titles/Reprise) (Farjeon)

The theme music used for the opening and closing titles was a composite of Herbert Farjeon's 1927 song "I've danced with a man, who's danced with a girl, who's danced with the Prince of Wales" and the opening of the British national anthem "God Save the King." The vocalist for "I've Danced with a Man", "Bring Down the Curtain" and "One More Dance" is Jenny Wren.

Al Bowlly's original recordings of "Isn't It Heavenly" and "Love Is the Sweetest Thing" are also used in the series.

The soundtrack album was produced and engineered by Barry Kingston for Robert Kingston Productions Ltd.

== Cast ==
- Edward Fox as King Edward VIII
- Cynthia Harris as Wallis Simpson
- David Waller as Stanley Baldwin
- Nigel Hawthorne as Walter Monckton
- Dame Peggy Ashcroft as Queen Mary
- Marius Goring as King George V
- Cherie Lunghi as Lady Thelma Furness
- Kika Markham as Freda Dudley Ward
- Jessie Matthews as Aunt Bessie Merryman
- Charles Keating as Ernest Simpson
- Andrew Ray as the Duke of York
- Amanda Reiss as the Duchess of York
- John Shrapnel as Alexander Hardinge and Private Secretary to Edward VIII
- Maurice Denham as Cosmo Lang, Archbishop of Canterbury
- Ed Devereaux as Lord Beaverbrook
- Geoffrey Lumsden as Geoffrey Dawson
- Patrick Troughton as Clement Attlee
- Trevor Bowen as Duff Cooper
- Patricia Hodge as Lady Diana Cooper
- Elsie Randolph as Lady Sibyl Colefax
- Bessie Love as Emerald (Maud) Cunard
- Tony Church as Sir Samuel Hoare
- Wensley Pithey as Winston Churchill
- Gary Waldhorn as Chips Channon
- Hugh Fraser as Anthony Eden
- Gerald Sim as Theodore Goddard
- Jeremy Child as equerry Piers "Joey" Legh
- Simon Cadell as equerry Major John Renton Aird
- Anthony Brown as equerry Hugh Lloyd Thomas
- Michael Stroud as Esmond Harmsworth
- William Hoyland as Lord-in-waiting Lord Brownlow

== Production ==
The series was made by Thames Television, part of the ITV network, at its Teddington Studios.

== Response ==
The series was produced and aired during the Duchess of Windsor's lifetime and it is reported that although becoming increasingly ill, she found the series to be a gross invasion of her privacy. Her requests to be sent a copy of the script were apparently ignored, and she received correspondence from people who said they would not watch the series.
