= James Orr (courtier) =

British colonial police officer and courtier (1917–2008)

James Bernard Vivian Orr CVO (19 November 1917 – 14 June 2008) was a police officer and Private Secretary to the Duke of Edinburgh from 1957 to 1970.

Orr was educated at Harrow School, and Gordonstoun School, and the Royal Military College, Sandhurst.

He joined the British South Africa Police in 1939, and remained until 1946. From 1941 to 1949, he was attached to the Ethiopia and Eritrea occupied Enemy Territory Administration Police Forces. In 1954–1957, he was a member of the Kenya Police.

Orr joined the Household of the Duke of Edinburgh in 1957. He retired in May 1970. From 1970 he was an Extra Equerry to the Duke of Edinburgh, and he subsequently worked as Secretary of the Medical Commission on Accident Prevention.

He was unmarried.

Orr was appointed a Member of the Royal Victorian Order (MVO) in 1962, and was promoted to Commander (CVO) in the 1968 Birthday Honours.
