= List of The Crown characters =

The Crown is a historical drama web television series about the reign of Queen Elizabeth II, created and principally written by Peter Morgan, and produced by Left Bank Pictures and Sony Pictures Television for Netflix. It grew out of Morgan's film The Queen (2006) and his stage play The Audience (2013).

The following is a list of characters and respective cast members who appeared on the television series. The majority of the cast has changed every two seasons to better portray the characters as they age.

== Characters and cast ==
List indicator

This section includes main cast members, recurring characters, and notable guest stars.

- A green cell indicates the actor is a main cast member.
- A yellow cell indicates the actor is a featured cast member.
- A red cell indicates the actor is a recurring cast member.
- A light blue cell indicates the actor is a guest or special guest cast member.

=== Main ===
The following characters have been credited as main cast in the opening credits.

Character	Appearances / actors					
Character	Season 1 (2016)	Season 2 (2017)	Season 3 (2019)	Season 4 (2020)	Season 5 (2022)	Season 6 (2023)
Queen Elizabeth II	Claire Foy	Claire Foy	Olivia Colman	Olivia Colman	Imelda Staunton	Imelda Staunton
Queen Elizabeth II	Verity Russell		Verity Russell	Claire Foy	Claire Foy	Viola Prettejohn (Note: Prettejohn is credited with the main cast in "Ritz" and as a guest star in "Sleep, Dearie Sleep".)
Queen Elizabeth II						Claire Foy
Queen Elizabeth II						Olivia Colman
Prince Philip, Duke of Edinburgh	Matt Smith	Matt Smith	Tobias Menzies	Tobias Menzies	Jonathan Pryce	Jonathan Pryce
Prince Philip, Duke of Edinburgh		Finn Elliot (Note: Elliot is credited with the main cast in "Paterfamilias" and as a guest star in "A Company of Men".)	Finn Elliot			
Princess Margaret	Vanessa Kirby	Vanessa Kirby	Helena Bonham Carter	Helena Bonham Carter	Lesley Manville	Lesley Manville
Princess Margaret	Beau Gadsdon		Beau Gadsdon		Vanessa Kirby (Note: Kirby and Miles are credited for flashback scenes in "Annus Horribilis" that used archival footage from the first two seasons.)	Beau Gadsdon
Queen Mary	Eileen Atkins				Candida Benson	
Anthony Eden	Jeremy Northam	Jeremy Northam				
Queen Elizabeth the Queen Mother	Victoria Hamilton	Victoria Hamilton	Marion Bailey	Marion Bailey	Marcia Warren	Marcia Warren
Peter Townsend	Ben Miles	Ben Miles			Timothy Dalton	Hamish Riddle
Peter Townsend					Ben Miles	
Louis Mountbatten	Greg Wise	Greg Wise	Charles Dance	Charles Dance		
King George VI	Jared Harris	Jared Harris				
Winston Churchill	John Lithgow	John Lithgow	John Lithgow			
Prince Edward, Duke of Windsor	Alex Jennings	Alex Jennings	Derek Jacobi		Alex Jennings	
Prince Edward, Duke of Windsor					Adam Buchanan	
Wallis, Duchess of Windsor	Lia Williams	Lia Williams	Geraldine Chaplin		Lia Williams	
Harold Macmillan		Anton Lesser				
Antony Armstrong-Jones		Matthew Goode	Ben Daniels			
Harold Wilson			Jason Watkins			
Anne, Princess Royal	Grace and Amelia Gilmour (uncredited)	Grace and Amelia Gilmour (uncredited)	Erin Doherty	Erin Doherty	Claudia Harrison	Claudia Harrison
Anne, Princess Royal		Lyla Barrett-Rye				
Charles, Prince of Wales	Billy Jenkins	Billy Jenkins	Josh O'Connor	Josh O'Connor	Dominic West	Dominic West
Charles, Prince of Wales		Julian Baring (Note: Baring is credited with the main cast in "Paterfamilias" and as a guest star in other season two episodes.)				
Diana, Princess of Wales				Emma Corrin	Elizabeth Debicki	Elizabeth Debicki
Margaret Thatcher				Gillian Anderson		
Margaret Thatcher				Eva Feiler		
Denis Thatcher				Stephen Boxer		
Camilla Parker Bowles			Emerald Fennell	Emerald Fennell	Olivia Williams	Olivia Williams
John Major				Marc Ozall	Jonny Lee Miller	
Penny Knatchbull					Natascha McElhone	
Tony Blair					Bertie Carvel	Bertie Carvel
Mohamed Al-Fayed					Salim Daw	Salim Daw
Mohamed Al-Fayed					Amir El-Masry	
Dodi Fayed					Khalid Abdalla	Khalid Abdalla
Prince William of Wales				Lucas Barber-Grant	Timothée Sambor	Rufus Kampa
Prince William of Wales				Elliott and Jasper Hughes	Senan West	Ed McVey
Prince Harry of Wales				Arran Tinker	Teddy Hawley	Fflyn Edwards
Prince Harry of Wales					Will Powell	Luther Ford
Catherine Middleton						Meg Bellamy
Catherine Middleton						Ella Bright

==== Featured ====
The following cast members have been credited in the opening titles of up to two episodes in a season.

Character	Appearances / actors					
Character	Season 1 (2016)	Season 2 (2017)	Season 3 (2019)	Season 4 (2020)	Season 5 (2022)	Season 6 (2023)
Graham Sutherland	Stephen Dillane					
Patricia Campbell		Gemma Whelan				
Lord Altrincham		John Heffernan				
Billy Graham		Paul Sparks				
John F. Kennedy		Michael C. Hall				
Jacqueline Kennedy		Jodi Balfour				
Kurt Hahn		Burghart Klaußner				
Lyndon B. Johnson			Clancy Brown			
Princess Alice of Battenberg	Rosalind Knight	Sophie Leigh Stone	Jane Lapotaire			
Edward Millward			Mark Lewis Jones			
Robin Woods			Tim McMullan			
Edward Heath			Michael Maloney (Note: Maloney is credited as a guest star in "Cri de Coeur".)			
Edward Heath			Louis Zegrean			
Andrew Parker Bowles			Andrew Buchan	Andrew Buchan	Daniel Flynn	
Roddy Llewellyn			Harry Treadaway	Harry Treadaway (Note: Treadaway is credited for archive footage in "The Hereditary Principle".)		
Michael Fagan				Tom Brooke		
Bob Hawke				Richard Roxburgh (Note: Roxburgh is credited with the main cast in "Terra Nullius" and as a guest star in "48:1".)		
Derek Johnson				Tom Burke		
Michael Shea				Nicholas Farrell		
Martin Bashir					Prasanna Puwanarajah	
Carole Middleton						Eve Best

=== Recurring ===
The following characters have appeared in two or more episodes within a season.

Character	Appearances / actors					
Character	Season 1 (2016)	Season 2 (2017)	Season 3 (2019)	Season 4 (2020)	Season 5 (2022)	Season 6 (2023)
Lord Salisbury	Clive Francis	Clive Francis				
Tommy Lascelles	Pip Torrens	Pip Torrens	Pip Torrens			
Martin Charteris	Harry Hadden-Paton	Harry Hadden-Paton	Charles Edwards	Charles Edwards		
Mike Parker	Daniel Ings	Daniel Ings				
Margaret "Bobo" MacDonald	Lizzy McInnerny	Lizzy McInnerny				
Duke of Norfolk	Patrick Ryecart	Patrick Ryecart	Patrick Ryecart			
Michael Adeane	Will Keen	Will Keen	David Rintoul			
Doctor Weir	James Laurenson	James Laurenson				
Cecil Beaton	Mark Tandy	Mark Tandy				
Clementine Churchill	Harriet Walter					
Jock Colville	Nicholas Rowe					
Clement Attlee	Simon Chandler					
Venetia Scott	Kate Phillips					
Archbishop of Canterbury	Ronald Pickup					
Harry Crookshank	Nigel Cooke					
Lord Chamberlain	Patrick Drury					
Archbishop of York	John Woodvine					
Prince Henry, Duke of Gloucester	Andy Sanderson	Andy Sanderson	Michael Thomas			
Rab Butler	Michael Culkin	Michael Culkin				
Walter Monckton	George Asprey	George Asprey				
The Queen's Equerry	James Hillier	James Hillier				
Collins	Jo Stone-Fewings					
Clarissa Eden	Anna Madeley	Anna Madeley				
Bishop of Durham	Tony Guilfoyle					
Billy Wallace	Nick Hendrix	Tom Durant-Pritchard				
Johnny Dalkeith	Josh Taylor	Josh Taylor				
Colin Tennant	David Shields	Pip Carter	Richard Teverson	Richard Teverson		
Bill Mattheson	Paul Thornley					
Eileen Parker		Chloe Pirrie				
Anthony Nutting		Nicholas Burns				
Master of the Household	Michael Bertenshaw	Michael Bertenshaw				
Lady Mountbatten		Lucy Russell				
Conolly Abel Smith		Adrian Lukis				
Prince Andrew of Greece and Denmark		Guy Williams				
Princess Cecilie of Greece and Denmark		Leonie Benesch	Leonie Benesch			
Meryn Lewis		Simon Paisley Day				
Dorothy Macmillan		Sylvestra Le Touzel				
Elizabeth Cavendish		Catherine Bailey				
Porchey	Joseph Kloska	Joseph Kloska	John Hollingworth			Tim Bentinck
Porchey						Joe Edgar
Bob Boothby		Paul Clayton				
Camilla Fry		Yolanda Kettle				
Jeremy Fry		Ed Cooper Clarke				
Dudley Moore		Ryan Sampson				
John Profumo		Tim Steed				
Freddie Bishop		Robert Irons				
Jim Orr		Oliver Maltman				
Jim Orr		Kit Redding				
Alec Douglas-Home		David Annen				
Stephen Ward		Richard Lintern				
Equerry			Sam Phillips	Sam Phillips		
Princess Alice, Duchess of Gloucester			Penny Downie	Penny Downie		
Winkie			Alan Gill			
Blinkie			Pippa Winslow			
Tony Benn			Mark Dexter			
Barbara Castle			Lorraine Ashbourne			
Richard Crossman			Aden Gillett			
Marcia Williams			Sinéad Matthews			
George Thomas			David Charles			
George Thomson			Stuart McQuarrie			
Sydney Johnson			Connie M'Gadzah		Jude Akuwudike	
Sydney Johnson					Joshua Kekana	
Prince Edward			Sidney Jackson	Angus Imrie	Sam Woolf	Sebastian Blunt
Prince Andrew			Marlo Woolley	Tom Byrne	James Murray	James Murray
Mark Thatcher				Freddie Fox		
Carol Thatcher				Rebecca Humphries		
Edward Adeane				Richard Goulding		
Virginia Pitman				Letty Thomas		
Carolyn Pride				Allegra Marland		
Anne Bolton				Flora Higgins		
Mark Phillips				Geoffrey Breton		
Bernard Ingham				Kevin McNally		
Sir Geoffrey Howe				Paul Jesson		
Jim Prior				Nicholas Day		
Lord Hailsham				Richard Syms		
Lord Soames				Peter Pacey		
John Nott				Paul Bigley		
Willie Whitelaw				Don Gallagher		
Francis Pym				Guy Siner		
Ruth, Lady Fermoy				Georgie Glen		
John Moore				Dugald Bruce-Lockhart		
Wendy Mitchell				Judith Paris		
Charles Powell				Dominic Rowan		
Sir Shridath Ramphal				Tony Jayawardena		
Sarah Lindsay				Alana Ramsey		
Sarah, Duchess of York				Jessica Aquilina	Emma Laird Craig	Emma Laird Craig
Patrick Jephson				Tom Turner	Jamie Glover	
Dickie Arbiter				David Phelan		
Equerry				Daniel Fraser		
Norma Major					Flora Montgomery	
Robert Fellowes					Andrew Havill	Andrew Havill
Norton Knatchbull					Elliot Cowan	
Nicholas Knatchbull					Edward Powell	
Alexandra Knatchbull					Elodie Vickers	
Richard Aylard					Alastair Mackenzie	
Timothy Laurence					Theo Fraser Steele	Theo Fraser Steele
Andrew Morton					Andrew Steele	
Charles Spencer					Phil Cumbus	Phil Cumbus
Hasnat Khan					Humayun Saeed	
Steve Hewlett					Michael Jibson	
Heini Wathén					Hanna Alström	Hanna Alström
Archbishop of Canterbury					Richard Rycroft	Richard Rycroft
Equerry					Ed Sayer	Ed Sayer
Andrew Gailey					Blake Ritson	Blake Ritson
Mark Bolland					Ben Lloyd-Hughes	Ben Lloyd-Hughes
Lord Chamberlain					Martin Turner	Martin Turner
Cherie Blair					Lydia Leonard	Lydia Leonard
Stephen Lamport						Alex Blake
Kez Wingfield						Lee Otway
Trevor Rees-Jones					Harry Anton	Harry Anton
Robin Janvrin						Jamie Parker
Henri Paul						Yoann Blanc
Philippe Dourneau						Paul Gorostidi
Thierry Rocher						Fred Ledoux
Alastair Campbell						Adam Damerell
Anji Hunter						Charlotte Melia
Fergus Boyd						Jack Cunningham-Nuttall
Olie Chadwyck-Healey						Isaac Rouse
Michael Middleton						Tim Dutton
Pippa Middleton						Matilda Broadbridge
James Middleton						Daniel Burt
Rupert Finch						Oli Green
Charlie Nelson						Charlie Beaven
Richard Thompson						Tristan Gemmill

=== Notable guests ===
The following cast members have appeared in a single episode within a season.

Character	Appearances / actors					
Character	Season 1 (2016)	Season 2 (2017)	Season 3 (2019)	Season 4 (2020)	Season 5 (2022)	Season 6 (2023)
Lord Moran	Nicholas Jones					
Ernest Augustus von Hanover	Daniel Betts					
Mary	Samantha Baines					
Thurman	Anthony Flanagan					
Nancy Lewis	Clare Foster					
Tony Longdon	Ed Stoppard					
Baron Nahum	Julius D'Silva	Julius D'Silva				
Mary Charteris	Jo Herbert	Jo Herbert				
John F. Dulles	Garrick Hagon					
Professor Hogg	Alan Williams					
Henry Marten	Michael Cochrane					
Norman Hartnell	Richard Clifford	Richard Clifford				
Commander Vyner	David Yelland					
Lady Doris	Caroline Goodall					
Imbert-Terry	John Standing					
Kathleen Sutherland	Amelia Bullmore					
Jean Wallop	Andrea Deck					
Gamal Abdel Nasser	Amir Boutrous	Amir Boutrous				
Judy Montagu	Abigail Parmenter	Abigail Parmenter				
Galina Ulanova		Aliya Tanikpaeva				
Christian Pineau		Sam Spiegel				
David Ben-Gurion		Hugh Futcher				
Helen King		Mirrah Foulkes				
Doctor Evans		Terrence Hardiman				
Bishop of Norwich		David Roper				
Dwight D. Eisenhower		Matthew Marsh				
Robin Day		Bertie Carvel				
Humphrey		Miles Jupp				
Gloria		Anne Lambton				
George Allen		Miles Richardson				
Fruity Metcalfe		Gareth Marks				
Vita Sackville-West		Janet Henfrey				
John Wheeler-Bennett		Tristan Sturrock				
Margaret Lambert		Stella Gonet				
Lady Baba Metcalfe		Rebecca Saire				
Adolf Hitler		Daniel Philpott				
Lady Anne Tennant		Grace Stone	Nancy Carroll	Nancy Carroll		Imogen Stubbs
The Countess of Rosse		Anna Chancellor				
Jacqui Chan		Alice Hewkin				
Kwame Nkrumah		Danny Sapani				
Patrick Plunket		Sam Crane				
Robert F. Kennedy		Julian Ovenden				
Leonid Brezhnev		James Borthwick				
Lee Radziwill		Skye Hallam				
Stanisław Radziwill		James Garnon				
Charles de Gaulle		Jacques Boudet				
Georg Donatus, Hereditary Grand Duke of Hesse		August Wittgenstein				
Princess Sophie of Greece and Denmark		Eliza Sodró				
Iain Tennant		Lewis MacLeod				
Peter Beck		Michael Fenton Stevens				
Stephen Ward		Richard Lintern				
Jonathan Miller		Josh Lacey				
Alan Bennett		Seb Carrington				
Princess Marina, Duchess of Kent		Clare Holman				
Christine Keeler		Gala Gordon				
Anthony Blunt			Samuel West			
Martin Furnival Jones			Angus Wright			
Michael Straight			Paul Hilton			
Mary Wilson			Teresa Banham			
James Jesus Angleton			Anthony Brophy			
Patrick Dean			Michael Simkins			
W. Marvin Watson			Martin McDougall			
Lady Bird Johnson			Suzanne Kopser			
Fred Phillips			Richard Harrington			
Gwen Edwards			Gwyneth Keyworth			
John Armstrong			Colin Morgan			
Chronos			Miltos Yerolemou			
Marquis Childs			Nigel Whitmey			
Lawrence E. Spivak			Colin Stinton			
Cecil Harmsworth King			Rupert Vansittart			
Cecil Boyd-Rochfort			Julian Glover			
Alec Head			Philippe Smolikowski			
Arthur "Bull" Hancock			John Finn			
Silvia Millward			Nia Roberts			
Thomas Parry			David Summer			
Richard Dimbleby			Henry Dimbleby			
Ben Bowen Thomas			Alan David			
Neil Armstrong			Henry Pettigrew			
Buzz Aldrin			Felix Scott			
Michael Collins			Andrew-Lee Potts			
Cliff Michelmore			Fred Broom			
Patrick Moore			Daniel Beales			
Priest Michael			Kevin Eldon			
Kenneth Harris			Matthew Baldwin			
Emperor Hirohito			Togo Igawa			
Arthur Scargill			David Wilmot			
Ann Parker Bowles			Judith Alexander			
Major Bruce Shand			Robert Benedetti-Hall			
Rosalind Shand			Nesba Crenshaw			
Joe Gormley			Richard Walsh			
Lucy Lindsay-Hogg			Jessica De Gouw			
Bodley Scott			Martin Wimbush			
Alastair Burnet			Dan Skinner			
John Betjeman			Tim Bentinck			
Lady Sarah Spencer				Isobel Eadie		Justine Mitchell
Patricia Knatchbull				Harriet Benson		
Dowager Lady Brabourne				Valerie Sarruf		
Timothy Knatchbull				Brandon Whitt		
Nicholas Knatchbull				Evan Whitt		
Lord Brabourne				Mark Carlisle		
Thomas McMahon				Mark Brennan		
Laurens van der Post				Roy Sampson		
Anne-Charlotte Verney				Karina Orr		
Admiral Henry Leach				Douglas Reith		
Graham Evans				Adam Fitzgerald		
Hazel Hawke				Naomi Allisstone		
Penelope Carter				Gemma Jones		
Katherine Bowes-Lyon				Trudie Emery		
Nerissa Bowes-Lyon				Pauline Hendrickson		
Hardy Amies				Peter Symonds		
Wayne Sleep				Jay Webb		
James Hewitt				Daniel Donskoy		
Elspeth Howe				Lin Sagovsky		
Margaret Heagarty				Annette Badland		
Kenneth Clarke				Nick Wymer		
Michael Howard				Al Barclay		
Norman Lamont				Keith Chopping		
Peter Lilley				Martin Fisher		
Cecil Parkinson				Duncan Duff		
Chris Patten				Oliver Milburn		
Malcolm Rifkind				Michael Mears		
Bernard Weatherill				Stephen Greif		
Leonora Knatchbull					Clara Graham	
Nigel Southward					Robert Portal	
John Latsis					Spyros Bibilas	
James Colthurst					Oliver Chris	
Monique Ritz					Philippine Leroy-Beaulieu	
Adnan Khashoggi					Ahmed Ghozzi	
Samira Khashoggi					Chayma Abdelkarimi	
Marie-Luce Townsend					Karine Ambrosio	
Jonathan Dimbleby					Ben Warwick	
Laura Parker-Bowles					Emilia Lazenby	Clementine Blake
Tom Parker-Bowles					James Harper-Jones	Bert Seymour
King George V					Richard Dillane	
Tsar Nicholas II of Russia					Aleksey Diakin	
Alexandra Feodorovna, Tsarina consort of Russia					Anja Antonowicz	
Grand Duchess Olga Nikolaevna of Russia					Anastasia Everall	
Grand Duchess Tatiana Nikolaevna of Russia					Julia Haworth	
Grand Duchess Anastasia Nikolaevna of Russia					Amy Fourman	
Grand Duchess Maria Nikolaevna of Russia					Tamara Sulkhanishvili	
Alexei Nikolaevich, Tsesarevich of Russia					William Biletsky	
Eugene Botkin					Oleg Mirochnikov	
Yakov Yurovsky					Gediminas Adomaitis	
Boris Yeltsin					Anatoliy Kotenyov	
Naina Yeltsina					Marina Shimanskaya	
Lord Stamfordham					Nicholas Lumley	
Oonagh Shanley-Toffolo					Olwen Fouéré	
Provost of Eton					Patrick Pearson	
John Birt					Nicholas Gleaves	
Duke Hussey					Richard Cordery	
Lady Susan Hussey					Haydn Gwynne	
Carol Kenyon					Danielle Fiamanya	
Susie Orbach					Kate Cook	Kate Cook
Fiona Shackleton					Annabel Mullion	
Kelly Fisher					Erin Richards	Erin Richards
Jonathan Powell					Thomas Nelstrop	Thomas Nelstrop
Captain Fletcher					Adonis Kapsalis	
Mario Brenna						Enzo Cilenti
Duncan Muir						Forbes Masson
Lady Jane Fellowes						Annette Flynn
Michael Jay						Eric Colvin
Jean-Pierre Chevènement						Christophe Guybet
Jacques Chirac						Laurent C. Lucas
Sally Morgan						Polly Frame
Lola Airdale-Cavendish-Kincaid						Honor Swinton Byrne
Harding Lawrence						Stuart Milligan
John Stevens						Lorcan Cranitch
Duke of Norfolk						Jonathan Hyde
Archbishop of Canterbury						Richard Heap
Bishop of Salisbury						Julian Wadham
Angela Kelly						Lizzie Hopley
