= Knatchbull =

Knatchbull is a surname. The surname Knatchbull has the meaning "knock out the bull", i.e. butcher.

Notable people with the surname include:

- Adrian Knatchbull-Hugessen
- Alexandra Knatchbull
- Daisy Knatchbull
- Dora Knatchbull, married name of Dora Bright (1862–1951), English composer and pianist
- Doreen Knatchbull, Baroness Brabourne
- Edward Knatchbull (disambiguation), various people
- Edward Knatchbull-Hugessen, 1st Baron Brabourne
- John Knatchbull, 7th Baron Brabourne
- Leonora Knatchbull
- Michael Knatchbull
- Michael Knatchbull, 5th Baron Brabourne
- Nicholas Knatchbull
- Norton Knatchbull (disambiguation), various people
- Patricia Knatchbull, 2nd Countess Mountbatten of Burma
