= Aylard =

Aylard is a surname. Notable people with the surname include:

- Joyce Aylard (1925–2022), codebreaker at Eastcote, an outstation of Bletchley Park, during World War II
- Richard Aylard (born 1952), British Royal Navy officer

== See also ==
- Allard (surname)
