= Lady Doris =

Lady Doris may refer to:

- Lady Doris (SP-3854), a motorboat briefly acquired by the U.S. Navy in 1918
- Lady Doris Vyner (1896–1980), a teenage friend of Queen Elizabeth the Queen Mother
- Lady Doris, a character on The Crown
- Lady Doris, a mare of Frederick W. Allen
- Lady Doris Furnival, a character in A Society Exile
- Lady Doris Peel (1900–1983), daughter of William Peel, 1st Earl Peel
- Lady Doris Gwendoline Hamilton-Temple-Blackwood (1895–1984), eldest daughter of Terence Hamilton-Temple-Blackwood, 2nd Marquess of Dufferin and Ava
- Lady Doris Curran, first wife of Lancelot Curran
- Doris Rhodes (1898–1982)

== See also ==
- Lunch Lady Doris, a The Simpsons character
- Doris (given name)
- Lady (disambiguation)
