= The Crown season 5 =

The Crown
- Season 5
- Promotional poster
- Starring: Imelda Staunton; Jonathan Pryce; Lesley Manville; Dominic West; Jonny Lee Miller; Olivia Williams; Claudia Harrison; Natascha McElhone; Marcia Warren; Elizabeth Debicki
- No. of episodes: 10

Release
- Original network: Netflix
- Original release: 9 November 2022

Season chronology
- ← Previous; Season 4 Next → Season 6

The fifth season of The Crown, which follows the life and reign of Queen Elizabeth II, was released by Netflix on 9 November 2022. It was the first season of the series to be released following both the death of Prince Philip, Duke of Edinburgh on 9 April 2021 and the death of Queen Elizabeth II on 8 September 2022; filming took place between the former and the latter's death.

Imelda Staunton stars as Elizabeth, along with main cast members Jonathan Pryce, Lesley Manville, Jonny Lee Miller, Dominic West and Elizabeth Debicki. All cast members are new to the series; this season marked The Crown's final wholesale recasting, following the ensembles led by Claire Foy (seasons one and two) and Olivia Colman (seasons three and four).

== Premise ==
The Crown traces the reign of Queen Elizabeth II from her wedding in 1947 through to the early 21st century.

The fifth season spans 1991–1997, during the premiership of John Major. Events depicted include Elizabeth's annus horribilis in 1992, Diana's Panorama interview, the separation and divorce of Prince Charles and Diana, Elizabeth's state visit to Russia, use of Prince Philip's DNA to identify the remains of the Romanov family, the decommissioning of Britannia, the handover of Hong Kong, and Major's departure from office and the beginning of Tony Blair's premiership.

== Cast ==
=== Main ===
- Imelda Staunton as Queen Elizabeth II
- Jonathan Pryce as Prince Philip, Duke of Edinburgh, Elizabeth's husband
- Lesley Manville as Princess Margaret, Countess of Snowdon, Elizabeth's younger sister
- Dominic West as Charles, Prince of Wales, Elizabeth and Philip's eldest child and the heir apparent
- Jonny Lee Miller as John Major, Prime Minister 1990–1997
- Olivia Williams as Camilla Parker Bowles, Charles's long-time lover
- Claudia Harrison as Anne, Princess Royal, Elizabeth and Philip's second child and only daughter
- Natascha McElhone as Penny Knatchbull, Lady Romsey, wife of Lord Romsey, first cousin once removed of Prince Philip
- Marcia Warren as Queen Elizabeth the Queen Mother, King George VI's widow, Elizabeth II and Margaret's mother
- Elizabeth Debicki as Diana, Princess of Wales, Charles's wife

==== Featured ====
The following actors are credited in the opening titles of episodes in which they play a significant role:

- Salim Daw as Mohamed Al-Fayed, Dodi Fayed's father
- Khalid Abdalla as Dodi Fayed, Diana's lover
- Alex Jennings as Prince Edward, Duke of Windsor, Elizabeth's paternal uncle and formerly King Edward VIII, who abdicated in 1936
- Lia Williams as Wallis, Duchess of Windsor, Elizabeth's paternal aunt by marriage and the Duke of Windsor's American wife
- Timothy Dalton as Peter Townsend, the man Margaret once hoped to marry
- Prasanna Puwanarajah as Martin Bashir, the journalist who conducted "An Interview with HRH The Princess of Wales"
- Bertie Carvel as Tony Blair, Prime Minister elected in 1997

=== Recurring ===
- Flora Montgomery as Norma Major, John Major's wife
- Andrew Havill as Sir Robert Fellowes, the Queen's private secretary and brother-in-law of Princess Diana
- Theo Fraser Steele as Timothy Laurence, Princess Anne's second husband
- James Murray as Prince Andrew, Duke of York, Elizabeth and Philip's third child
- Sam Woolf as Prince Edward, Elizabeth and Philip's youngest child
- Senan West as Prince William of Wales, Charles and Diana's elder son and the second-in-line for the British throne.
  - Timothée Sambor as young Prince William of Wales
- Humayun Saeed as Hasnat Khan, Diana's lover from 1995 to 1997
- Lydia Leonard as Cherie Blair, Tony Blair's wife
- Jude Akuwudike as Sydney Johnson, the Duke of Windsor's valet/footman
- Oliver Chris as Dr. James Colthurst, Princess Diana's close friend
- Jamie Glover as Patrick Jephson, Princess Diana's private secretary
- Alastair Mackenzie as Richard Aylard, Prince Charles's private secretary
- Phil Cumbus as Charles Spencer, 9th Earl Spencer, Princess Diana's younger brother
- Richard Rycroft as George Carey, Archbishop of Canterbury
- Blake Ritson as Andrew Gailey, Prince William's housemaster at Eton College
- Hanna Alström as Heini Wathén, Mohamed Al-Fayed's second wife
- Michael Jibson as Steve Hewlett, editor of "An Interview with HRH The Princess of Wales"

=== Notable guests ===
- Claire Foy as young Queen Elizabeth
- Vanessa Kirby as young Princess Margaret (Note: Kirby and Miles are credited for flashback scenes in "Annus Horribilis" that used archival footage from the first two seasons.)
- Amir El-Masry as young Mohamed Al-Fayed
- Adam Buchanan as young Edward, Prince of Wales
- Ben Miles as young Peter Townsend
- Joshua Kekana as young Sydney Johnson
- Erin Richards as Kelly Fisher, Dodi Fayed's girlfriend prior to meeting Diana, Princess of Wales
- Emma Laird Craig as Sarah, Duchess of York, Andrew's wife
- Helen Ryan as Peggy Roath, a personal aide to Queen Elizabeth II
- Will Powell as Prince Harry of Wales, Charles and Diana's younger son and the third-in-line to the British throne
  - Teddy Hawley as young Prince Harry of Wales
- Chayma Abdelkarimi as Samira Khashoggi, Mohamed Al-Fayed's first wife
- Ahmed Ghozzi as Adnan Khashoggi, Samira's brother and Dodi's maternal uncle
- Abdelatif Hwidar as Ali-Ali Al-Fayed, Mohamed's father and Dodi's paternal grandfather
- Mohammed Kamel as Ali Al-Fayed, Mohamed's brother and Dodi's paternal uncle
  - Moemen Hesham as young Ali Al-Fayed
- Semo Salha as Salah Al-Fayed, Mohamed's brother and Dodi's paternal uncle
  - Said Chatiby as young Salah Al-Fayed
- Philippine Leroy-Beaulieu as Monique Ritz, Charles Ritz's widow
- Richard Dillane as King George V, Edward VIII and George VI's father and Elizabeth II's paternal grandfather
- Candida Benson as Queen Mary, George V's wife, Edward VIII and George VI's mother and Elizabeth II's paternal grandmother
- Daniel Flynn as Andrew Parker Bowles, Camilla's husband
- Emilia Lazenby as Laura Parker Bowles, Camilla and Andrew's daughter
- James Harper-Jones as Tom Parker Bowles, Camilla and Andrew's son
- Aleksey Diakin as Tsar Nicholas II of Russia, Emperor of Russia, George V's maternal first cousin
- Anja Antonowicz as Tsarina Alexandra Feodorovna of Russia, Empress of Russia, George V's paternal first cousin, Prince Philip's maternal grandaunt, wife of Nicholas II
- Anastasia Everall as Grand Duchess Olga Nikolaevna of Russia, Nicholas II and Alexandra's elder daughter, Edward VIII and George VI's second cousin
- Julia Haworth as Grand Duchess Tatiana Nikolaevna of Russia, Nicholas II and Alexandra's second daughter, Edward VIII and George VI's second cousin
- Tamara Sulkhanishvili as Grand Duchess Maria Nikolaevna of Russia, Nicholas II and Alexandra's third daughter, Edward VIII and George VI's second cousin
- Amy Fourman as Grand Duchess Anastasia Nikolaevna of Russia, Nicholas II and Alexandra's fourth daughter, Edward VIII and George VI's second cousin
- William Biletsky as Alexei Nikolaevich, Tsesarevich of Russia, Nicholas II and Alexandra's only son and heir, Edward VIII and George VI's second cousin
- Oleg Mirochnikov as Eugene Botkin, Court Physician to the Tsar and Tsarina of Russia
- Gediminas Adomaitis as Yakov Yurovsky, Chief Executioner of the Tsar of Russia and his family
- Nicholas Lumley as Lord Stamfordham, private secretary to King George V, and maternal grandfather of the Queen's former private secretary Lord Adeane
- Elliot Cowan as Norton Knatchbull, Lord Romsey, grandson of Lord Mountbatten
- Edward Powell as Nicholas Knatchbull, Lord and Lady Romsey's son
- Elodie Vickers as Alexandra Knatchbull, Lord and Lady Romsey's daughter
- Clara Graham as Leonora Knatchbull, Lord and Lady Romsey's daughter, who died of kidney cancer
- Anatoliy Kotenyov as Boris Yeltsin, President of Russia
- Marina Shimanskaya as Naina Yeltsina, First Lady of Russia, wife of Boris Yeltsin
- Nicholas Gleaves as John Birt, Director General of the BBC
- Richard Cordery as Marmaduke "Duke" Hussey, Chairman of the Board of Governors of the BBC
- Haydn Gwynne as Lady Susan Hussey, Elizabeth II's senior lady-in-waiting
- Andrew Steele as Andrew Morton, Princess Diana's biographer
- Ben Lloyd-Hughes as Mark Bolland, public relations executive and deputy private secretary to Prince Charles
- Karine Ambrosio as Marie-Luce Townsend, Peter Townsend's wife
- Annabel Mullion as Fiona Shackleton, the Solicitor to the Prince of Wales
- Kate Cook as Susie Orbach, Princess Diana's therapist
- Ben Warwick as Jonathan Dimbleby, the journalist who interviewed Charles for Charles: The Private Man, the Public Role
- Martin Turner as The Earl of Airlie, Lord Chamberlain and brother-in-law of Princess Alexandra, The Hon. Lady Ogilvy

== Episodes ==
No. overall	No. in season	Title	Directed by	Written by	Original release date
41	1	"Queen Victoria Syndrome"	Jessica Hobbs	Peter Morgan	9 November 2022
In 1953, Elizabeth launches the Royal Yacht Britannia. In 1991, Elizabeth and Philip make a two-week cruise aboard the ageing Britannia while Charles and Diana travel to Italy for what is seen as their second honeymoon. Diana is annoyed that Charles has invited his cousin, Norton, and cousin-in-law, Penelope, to join them; even more so when Charles cuts the holiday short due to a "diary conflict". A Sunday Times poll reveals that half of the British public favours Elizabeth, seen as having been on the throne for too long, abdicating so that Charles would become king. Elizabeth meets the new Prime Minister John Major at Balmoral Castle and asks the government to fund renovations to Britannia. Major agrees despite admitting his reluctance. Philip, Charles, Diana, and Margaret talk to Major during the Ghillies Ball, each confiding their troubles. Major later tells his wife Norma that the Royal Family's situation threatens the country's stability.
42	2	"The System"	Jessica Hobbs	Peter Morgan	9 November 2022
Philip receives news of the Knatchbulls' daughter's death while giving an interview about how he got into carriage driving. To help a grieving Penelope, he introduces her to the sport. Diana learns from friend James Colthurst that journalist Andrew Morton plans to write a tell-all biography. She agrees to help Morton, seeing the book as a chance to tell her side of the story. To prevent direct contact, Morton gives Colthurst questions to deliver to Diana, who conveys answers back to Morton. Philip reflects on his grief over his sister's death while helping Penelope establish a charity in her daughter's memory. Penelope then informs Philip about the rumours concerning Diana and her involvement with Morton. Colthurst gets into a traffic accident, Morton's home is broken into, and Philip warns Diana about the consequences of disloyalty during a surprise visit. Morton's book is published amid growing tensions between Diana and the Royal Family.
43	3	"Mou Mou"	Alex Gabassi	Peter Morgan	9 November 2022
In 1946 Alexandria, Egypt, Coca-Cola street vendor Mohamed Al-Fayed briefly meets the Duke and Duchess of Windsor. In 1979, Mohamed, now a rich businessman, purchases the Hôtel Ritz Paris. Mohamed has his son, Dodi, dismiss black waiter Sydney Johnson at a reception, but rehires him after discovering he was the Duke of Windsor's valet. Johnson teaches Mohamed British customs and etiquette. Mohamed purchases the Harrods store and becomes an executive producer of Chariots of Fire, which wins the Academy Award for Best Picture. In 1986, following the Duchess of Windsor's death, Mohamed leases and restores the Windsors' villa. On receiving an invitation to visit, the Queen sends her private secretary, Sir Robert Fellowes, to take possession of certain items for the Royal Collection. Johnson dies shortly afterwards. At the Royal Windsor Horse Show, Mohamed meets Diana, whom the Queen sends to sit with him, and introduces her to Dodi.
44	4	"Annus Horribilis"	May el-Toukhy	Peter Morgan	9 November 2022
Margaret receives a letter from Peter Townsend and learns he will be in London for a veterans' reception. The former lovers reunite, with Townsend saying that he plans to return the letters written during their relationship. Andrew asks Elizabeth for permission to separate after compromising photos of his wife are published; a recently-divorced Anne announces her intention to marry Timothy Laurence, and Charles argues his marital struggles will affect the Royal Family. A fire breaks out at Windsor Castle, destroying over one hundred rooms. Townsend tells Margaret that he is dying before kissing her. Margaret tells Elizabeth she is still furious that she was not allowed to marry Townsend. During a luncheon marking her Ruby Jubilee, Elizabeth delivers a speech describing 1992 as an "annus horribilis".
45	5	"The Way Ahead"	May el-Toukhy	Peter Morgan	9 November 2022
Following Elizabeth's decision to allow Charles and Diana to separate, the senior royals create an informal group of advisors to find ways to improve the monarchy's image. The group comes up with only minor measures. A tabloid newspaper publishes transcripts of an intimate telephone conversation between Charles and Camilla from three years earlier. To improve his public image, Charles participates in an ITV documentary. Diana upstages him on the night of the premiere by attending an event in an outfit dubbed by the media as a "revenge dress". Anne reports to the senior royals following a meeting with Charles, stating that he is emerging from the scandal stronger than ever and is setting up his own circle of advisors to work on The Prince's Trust.
46	6	"Ipatiev House"	Christian Schwochow	Peter Morgan	9 November 2022
In 1917, George V and Queen Mary are asked by the British government to support the dispatch of a warship to Russia to bring Tsar Nicholas II and his family to the United Kingdom. At Ipatiev House in Yekaterinburg, the Romanovs are executed by local Bolsheviks. In 1992, the Queen receives Russian president Boris Yeltsin at Buckingham Palace. Yeltsin invites the Queen for a state visit to Russia. The Queen, pointing out that Yeltsin carried out the order to demolish Ipatiev House, makes it a condition for the remains of the Romanovs to be exhumed and reburied. Yeltsin agrees, and Prince Philip helps identify the remains through DNA profiling by providing his samples. On the state visit to Russia, Philip admits to the Queen that he has sought intellectual companionship elsewhere, the closest friend being Lady Romsey. The Queen invites Lady Romsey to make a public appearance alongside the royal family to dispel rumours of any impropriety.
47	7	"No Woman's Land"	Erik Richter Strand	Peter Morgan	9 November 2022
Prince William begins attending Eton College. Diana struggles with her separation and the changing relationship with her son. Martin Bashir, a journalist for the BBC current affairs programme Panorama, gains the confidence of Earl Spencer, Diana's brother. Bashir claims that Charles and Diana's staff such as Patrick Jephson are spying for the security services. Diana meets the surgeon Hasnat Khan. William confides to the Queen that he sometimes worries about his mother. Diana waits around the hospital until she has another encounter with Khan. Earl Spencer introduces Diana to Bashir; Bashir persuades Diana to film an interview to tell her story in response to Charles's documentary. Diana and Khan see a film together, then share a kiss. Bashir encourages Diana over her feelings of insecurity.
48	8	"Gunpowder"	Erik Richter Strand	Peter Morgan	9 November 2022
Diana and Khan continue their relationship. Bashir and his editor Steve Hewlett are given the go-ahead by BBC director-general John Birt to conduct the interview. Earl Spencer notes inconsistencies in Bashir's accounts and advises Diana to cease contact, but Bashir persuades Diana to continue. Bashir and his team film "An Interview with HRH The Princess of Wales" under secrecy in Diana's flat at Kensington Palace on bonfire night. Reviewing the footage, Birt is stunned by the explosive content and has misgivings about letting it air, but does not terminate it. Diana informs the Queen of the interview in advance of its broadcast, which the Queen notes is on her and Prince Philip's 48th wedding anniversary.
49	9	"Couple 31"	Christian Schwochow	Peter Morgan	9 November 2022
The Queen writes to Charles and Diana advising them to divorce. Diana deals with the fallout of the Panorama interview and the end of her relationship with Khan. With Charles and Diana unable to agree on settlement terms, the Queen asks Major to act as an intermediary. Charles engages the services of public relations executive Mark Bolland, who advises him to agree to terms so that Charles and Camilla can improve their public image. Charles and Diana agree on a settlement. Charles visits Diana at her flat, where they nearly make amends before the conversation turns to their marriage, at which point they argue again, prompting Charles to storm out. A government worker finalises their divorce paperwork; the episode ends with newsreel footage of Charles and Diana's wedding.
50	10	"Decommissioned"	Alex Gabassi	Peter Morgan	9 November 2022
The Labour Party led by Tony Blair wins the 1997 general election by a landslide. With Blair making it clear that he will not fund a new yacht with taxpayers' money, and his proposal for private financing rejected by the Queen, she decides to retire Britannia without replacement. Diana and her sons are invited by Mohamed Al-Fayed to a holiday in Saint-Tropez. Charles travels to Hong Kong to give a speech marking the handover of Hong Kong. After the handover ceremony, he meets Blair on Britannia to discuss modernising the monarchy. Before the decommissioning of Britannia, the Queen returns to the yacht for a private farewell.

== Production ==
=== Casting ===
In January 2020, Imelda Staunton was announced as succeeding Colman as the Queen in the fifth season, and her role in the final sixth season was reported in July. Also in July 2020, Lesley Manville was announced as portraying Princess Margaret, and the following month, Jonathan Pryce and Elizabeth Debicki had been cast as Prince Philip and Diana, Princess of Wales, respectively. In October 2020, Dominic West was in talks to play Prince Charles and was officially confirmed as part of the cast in April 2021. In June 2021, Jonny Lee Miller was cast as John Major and Olivia Williams announced that she would portray Camilla Parker Bowles. On 18 November 2021, it was announced that Senan West, the real-life son of Dominic, was cast as Prince William. In March 2022, Philippine Leroy-Beaulieu was cast as Monique Ritz. Khalid Abdalla plays Dodi Fayed; he relied on a piece of audio of Fayed doing a call-in for The Larry King Show to get a handle on Fayed's accent whilst speaking English, as Abdalla was unable to find an audio clip of Dodi Fayed online.

=== Filming ===
Filming for the season began in July 2021. Jemima Khan, who was a friend of Princess Diana, revealed that she had stepped down as a consultant and co-writer on episodes focusing on the Princess over concerns that the story of her final years would not be properly portrayed. Filming was temporarily halted that December after eight crew members tested positive for COVID-19, which resulted in them being quarantined.

=== Music ===
While not on the soundtrack, "Emotions" by American singer Mariah Carey was featured in the first episode.

The Crown: Season Five

Soundtrack album by Martin Phipps
- Released: 11 November 2022
- Genre: Soundtrack
- Length: 38:29
- Label: Sony Music

Martin Phipps soundtrack chronology
The Railway Children Return (2022)	The Crown: Season Five (2022)	Napoleon (2023)

No.	Title	Length
1.	"Actually Her"	3:12
2.	"Feet Up"	3:11
3.	"Al Fayed"	3:15
4.	"A Companion"	1:54
5.	"Ipatiev House"	3:30
6.	"To The Grave"	2:56
7.	"Forty Years"	3:14
8.	"Gunpowder"	3:31
9.	"Hasnat"	3:02
10.	"Outsiders"	3:30
11.	"Carriages"	3:19
12.	"Voices" (Remix)	3:48
Total length:		38:29

== Release ==
The season was released on the Netflix streaming service 9 November 2022. It was then released on DVD and Blu-ray in the United Kingdom on 16 October 2023 and worldwide the following day.

== Reception ==
=== Audience viewership ===
During its debut week, the season topped Netflix's Top ten TV English titles with 107.39 million hours viewed. The following week, it remained number one with 84.31 million viewing hours. In its third week, it ranked at number three and generated 42.36 million viewing hours.

=== Critical response ===
Rotten Tomatoes reported a 71% approval rating for the season based on 103 reviews, with an average rating of 6.75/10. Its critical consensus reads: "In its fifth season, it's hard to shake the feeling that this series has lost some of its luster – but addictive drama and a sterling cast remain The Crown's jewels." On Metacritic, the season holds a score of 65 out of 100 based on 37 critics, indicating "generally favorable" reviews.

TVLine named Elizabeth Debicki and Dominic West the "Performers of the Week" on 19 November 2022, for their performances in the penultimate episode "Couple 31", writing: "...in one masterful scene near the end of the season's penultimate episode, the newly divorced pair met in private to share a few laughs and take a hard look what went wrong with their relationship, with Debicki and West bringing shocking candor and fresh vulnerability to the two former sweethearts. In the extended scene [...] Debicki and West [displayed] a warmth we hadn’t seen between these two since they first started dating". Meanwhile, Lesley Manville was given an honourable mention on 12 November 2022 for her performance in the episode "Annus Horribilis". The website wrote: "...Manville [brought] magnificent depth to a woman looking back on her life and wondering if things could’ve been different".

However, many reviewers criticised the season for comparing poorly with earlier ones. Writing for The Atlantic, Shirley Li comments that "The new season of The Crown never risks challenging anyone's reputation. Instead, it merely risks its own as a compelling show". In Variety, Caroline Framke comments that "Morgan's scripts [hammer] their most obvious themes home with clattering thuds, pushing allegory after allegory with vanishingly little nuance". In The Guardian, Jack Seale concludes that "these new episodes are bitty and often just boring, with Morgan casting around for side plots to hide the fact that everything he has to say about the Windsors has already been said".

=== Controversy ===
After the fourth season, there were increased calls for Netflix to add a disclaimer to The Crown to emphasise that the series is a fictionalised portrayal based on historical events. These calls increased given that the fifth season was released only two months after the Queen's death. Veteran actress Judi Dench wrote an open letter to The Times, deeming the series "crude sensationalism" and calling for a disclaimer to be added. Netflix updated both the series description and the season five trailer caption on YouTube to refer to the series as a "fictional dramatization". However, upon the release of the series, no episode contained a disclaimer.

== Historical accuracy ==
Ahead of its release, former Prime Minister John Major publicly criticised the series, and Tony Blair's spokesman described the first episode of the season, where (in 1991 and 1997) Prince Charles is portrayed attempting to recruit John Major and Tony Blair to support the Queen's abdication in favour of him, as "complete and utter rubbish". Major stated that no such conversation took place, and that the scene was "a barrel-load of malicious nonsense". The Sunday Times article recorded that at the time nine out of ten people felt 'very favourably' or 'mainly favourably' about the Queen, while four in ten felt she should abdicate 'at some point in the future', rather than continue until her death. In the same episode, Major suggests that the Queen should give up on the idea of having HMY Britannia refurbished or replaced at a time of national belt-tightening. Correspondence with his principal private secretary Alex Allan, however, shows that the decision was made "in the light of the current debate about the Royal Family and the Monarchy", which stemmed from high-profile separations and divorces among family members. The plot in episode two which shows James Colthurst run off the road by a white van and Andrew Morton finding his home ransacked is fictionalised.

Episode three shows the Duke and Duchess of Windsor visiting Alexandria in 1946, where they are seen by a young Mohamed Al-Fayed from a distance. However, there is no record of the couple having visited Egypt that year. The episode also suggests that Diana met Dodi Fayed during a polo match in the 1990s, but they reportedly met during a match in 1986 where Charles was also present. In episode three after the death of Wallis Simpson in 1986, Sydney Johnson the former valet for 30 years to her husband Edward VIII is deeply saddened and so his new employer Mohamed Al-Fayed takes him to visit her now dilapidated Paris home nicknamed Villa Windsor. Al Fayed is shocked to learn that the French government has seized the house with intent to auction it and its contents. Fayed purchases the estate from France and renovates everything as a gift to the Royal Family. A representative of the family arrives in place of a Royal visit, and requests all the restored items including the abdication desk, paintings and papers. Rather than being upset at the apparent snub Al-Fayed is instead overjoyed that his efforts have been recognised. The true circumstances however were different: the house had always been rented from the Paris Council, Al Fayed took a 50-year lease for $1m per year under the proviso that he would restore it; he was also allowed to keep the art and furniture to decorate it. She bequeathed the rest of her belongings, which had personal value to the Royal Family, as charity to the Pasteur Institute. Al Fayed paid $4.5m to acquire them at auction but was outbid on her jewellery which sold the following year for $50m. In 1998 he auctioned the Windsor Collection in aid of his and his sons' charities raising $23m. The Royal Family were believed to have acquired all the items by bidding via proxies, finally returning the abdication desk (sale price $415,000), papers and other belongings to the family.

Episode four, which covers the Queen's annus horribilis speech, shows her acknowledging "the errors of the past" in her speech, none of which occurred during the lunch at the Guildhall. The episode also incorrectly depicts Princess Margaret appearing on Desert Island Discs, whereas she was a guest on the show in 1981. Additionally, her initial reunion with Peter Townsend had occurred in 1978, not in the 1990s. The scene in the next episode which depicts Prince Charles breakdancing in the mid-1990s is inspired by a charity visit by the prince in 1985. Episode six begins with the murder of the Romanov family, portraying George V refusing to offer political asylum to the Russian imperial family at the advice of his wife Queen Mary, who is shown to have opposed the idea because the tsarina was pro-German. Government papers released in the 1980s show that it was George himself who opposed the idea due to the tsar's unpopularity in Britain.

Episode eight shows Diana warning the Queen about her upcoming Panorama interview, but it has been reported that in reality the interview had surprised the royal family, with no advance warning. A scene in episode ten that shows Charles confronting the Queen about the prospects of her abdication is an invention, but the prince did privately meet Blair — then Prime Minister — during the Handover of Hong Kong Sovereignty, although the meeting was brief.
