= Kate Snell =

British author and filmmaker

Kate Snell is a British author and filmmaker. She researched the life of Princess Diana and published a book, Diana: Her Last Love (2000), which is the basis for the film, Diana (2013) and British Indian actor Naveen Andrews as Dr. Hasnat Khan. A reissue of Diana: Her Last Love appeared as a tie-in to the film and was published in August 2013 by Andre Deutsch, an imprint of Carlton Books.

Snell's book Deceived (2007), about conman Robert Freegard, who posed as a spy for 10 years, was published by Orion Books. Deceived was written following the 2005 production of the award-winning feature-length documentary, The Spy Who Stole My Life, which was directed by Snell and produced by her production company, Creative Touch Films.

Her book The Care Home Swindler was published by Sphere in March 2026.

Snell is a former reporter for the BBC's Woman’s Hour, a producer of BBC current affairs programme Panorama, and Series Producer for the BBC’s foreign affairs strand Correspondent.
