= Diana (2013 film) =

2013 film by Oliver Hirschbiegel

- UK theatrical release poster
- Directed by: Oliver Hirschbiegel
- Screenplay by: Stephen Jeffreys
- Based on: Diana: Her Last Love by Kate Snell
- Produced by: Robert Bernstein; Douglas Rae
- Starring: Naomi Watts; Naveen Andrews
- Cinematography: Rainer Klausmann
- Edited by: Hans Funck
- Music by: David Holmes; Keefus Ciancia
- Production companies: MGM Television; Ecosse Films; Le Pacte; Film i Väst; Filmgate Films; Scope Pictures; MP Film
- Distributed by: Metro-Goldwyn-Mayer (United States); Entertainment One (United Kingdom); Le Pacte (France); Svensk Filmindustri (Sweden, Finland and Norway); Cinéart (Belgium)
- Release dates: 5 September 2013 (Premiere); 20 September 2013 (United Kingdom)
- Running time: 113 minutes
- Countries: United Kingdom; France; Sweden; Belgium
- Languages: English; French; Swedish; Dutch
- Budget: $15 million
- Box office: $21.7 million

Diana is a 2013 biographical drama film directed by Oliver Hirschbiegel and written by Stephen Jeffreys. Naomi Watts stars as Diana, Princess of Wales, with Naveen Andrews, Douglas Hodge, and Geraldine James in supporting roles.

Based on Kate Snell's 2001 book Diana: Her Last Love, the film focuses on the final two years of Diana's life, particularly her secret relationship with heart surgeon Hasnat Khan.

Diana had its world premiere in London on 5 September 2013 and was released in the UK on 20 September 2013. The film received overwhelmingly negative reviews from critics upon release, with sharp criticism for its direction, screenplay, and Watts' portrayal of the late Princess. At the box office it grossed $21.7 million worldwide against a budget of $15 million.

== Plot ==
The film depicts the last two years of Diana, Princess of Wales's life, beginning with her divorce from Charles, Prince of Wales. Diana meets and falls in love with Pakistani heart surgeon Hasnat Khan. The film highlights her humanitarian work, including her tours of Angola in her campaign against the use of land mines. It also shows her trips to Australia, Pakistan, New York City, Bosnia, Italy, and ultimately Paris, with detailed recreations of her real-life outfits.

Diana's relationship with Dr. Khan eventually ends due to his desire for a private life and discomfort with her celebrity status. The film portrays her subsequent affair with Anglo-Egyptian billionaire Dodi Fayed as a calculated effort to make Dr. Khan jealous. The story culminates in the fatal car crash that killed Diana, Fayed, and their driver in the Pont de l'Alma Tunnel in Paris—though the film does not re-enact the crash itself.

== Cast ==
- Naomi Watts as Diana, Princess of Wales
- Naveen Andrews as Dr. Hasnat Khan
- Cas Anvar as Dodi Fayed
- Laurence Belcher as Prince William
- Harry Holland as Prince Harry
- Douglas Hodge as Paul Burrell
- Geraldine James as Oonagh Toffolo
- Charles Edwards as Patrick Jephson
- Mary Stockley as Assistant
- Juliet Stevenson as Sonia
- Michael Byrne as Christiaan Barnard

== Production ==
The screenplay, based on Kate Snell's 2001 book Diana: Her Last Love, was written by Stephen Jeffreys. Robert Bernstein and Douglas Rae produced the film for Ecosse Films.

Key scenes involving Diana and Dodi Fayed on his family yacht, Jonikal, were filmed on the luxury charter yacht Princess Iolanthe. The opening and closing scenes at the Hôtel Ritz Paris' Imperial Suite were filmed at Fetcham Park House in Fetcham, Surrey. Other filming locations include the Croatian cities of Opatija, Rovinj and Zagreb.

== Reception ==
Diana received overwhelmingly negative reviews from critics upon release, with sharp criticism for its direction, screenplay, and Naomi Watts' portrayal of the late Princess.

On the review aggregator website Rotten Tomatoes, 7% of 104 critics' reviews are positive. The website's consensus reads: "Naomi Watts tries hard in the title role, but Diana buries her efforts under a shoddy script and clumsy direction." Metacritic, which uses a weighted average, assigned the film a score of 35 out of 100, based on 28 critics, indicating "generally unfavorable" reviews.

David Edwards from The Mirror criticized the film as a "cheap and cheerless effort that looks like a Channel 5 mid-week matinee" and quipped that "Wesley Snipes in a blonde wig would be more convincing," awarding the film 1 star out of 5. Peter Bradshaw of The Guardian also gave it 1 star out of 5, dubbing the film "car crash cinema."

However, some reviewers praised Watts' performance despite the overall negative reception. Joshua Rothkopf of Time Out New York called Watts's performance "extraordinary" and rated the film 3 stars out of 5, describing it as "a restrained biopic that affords its subject the romantic privacy that life denied her." Nigel Andrews of the Financial Times praised Watts’ performance, saying "once again Watts supplies the wattage" but noted that her role felt "frighteningly isolated... the compensating passion in a torpid drama." Jim Schembri of 3AW also praised Watts’ "impressive performance" but felt the film "could have done with another half-hour putting more meat onto the bones of these underdeveloped chapters of her story." Dominic Corry of flicks.co.nz criticized the film as "bad in the blandest way possible" and lamented that "Watts is let down by the Mills & Boon-level script." Fionnuala Halligan of Screen International echoed this, saying that Watts’ "brave performance should not be underestimated given the poverty of the dialogue and the pressure of the part."

== Awards ==
At the 34th Golden Raspberry Awards, Watts received a nomination for Worst Actress for her performances in both Diana and Movie 43, but lost to Tyler Perry for his performance in drag in A Madea Christmas.

== Soundtrack ==
Diana (Original Motion Picture Soundtrack)

Soundtrack album by David Holmes and Keefus Ciancia
- Released: 23 September 2013
- Genre: Soundtrack
- Length: 36:15
- Label: Canderblinks

David Holmes soundtrack chronology
The Motel Life (2012)	Diana (Original Motion Picture Soundtrack) (2013)	Light of My Eyes (2014)

Keefus Ciancia soundtrack chronology
Nashville (2013)	Diana (Original Motion Picture Soundtrack) (2013)	The Fall Season (2013)

No.	Title	Length
1.	"Culture of Duty"	2:00
2.	"Lone Runner"	1:23
3.	"Hospital"	2:36
4.	"Lonely Souls"	3:18
5.	"The Kiss"	4:00
6.	"Missed You So Much"	1:28
7.	"To the Edge of The..."	1:58
8.	"Stranded"	1:54
9.	"Underwater"	1:15
10.	"Caught in Flight"	1:40
11.	"New York City"	2:25
12.	"It's Over"	1:07
13.	"Kings Cross"	1:22
14.	"Some Mother's Son"	1:02
15.	"Call"	1:04
16.	"Paparazzi"	1:44
17.	"Alone"	1:57
18.	"Gone"	3:54
Total length:		36:15
