= Penelope Knatchbull, Countess Mountbatten of Burma =

British peeress (born 1953)

The Right Honourable The Countess Mountbatten of Burma

High Steward of Romsey Town Council
- Incumbent
- Assumed office 2010

Personal details
- Born: Penelope Meredith Mary Eastwood; 16 April 1953 (age 73) London, England
- Spouse: Norton Knatchbull, 3rd Earl Mountbatten of Burma (m. 1979)
- Children: Nicholas Knatchbull, Lord Brabourne; Lady Alexandra Hooper; The Hon. Leonora Knatchbull

Penelope Meredith Mary Knatchbull, Countess Mountbatten of Burma (née Eastwood; born 16 April 1953) is a British aristocrat and the wife of Norton Knatchbull, 3rd Earl Mountbatten of Burma. Since 2010, she has served as High Steward of Romsey.

== Early life ==
Born in London, she is the only daughter of Reginald Wray Frank Eastwood (1912–1980), a butcher who became the founder of Angus Steakhouse, and Marian Elizabeth (1926–2020), née Hood. She had a younger brother, Peter Eastwood (1955–2013). She grew up and was educated in Switzerland. In 1976, she graduated from the London School of Economics.

== Activities ==
In 2010, she succeeded her husband in the honorary position of High Steward of Romsey after he left the family to pursue an "amorous adventure" with fashion designer Jeannie Nuttall in the Bahamas. The position had previously been filled by the 1st Earl Mountbatten of Burma. She was inaugurated on 2 March 2011. Following the death of her daughter, she founded Leonora Children's Cancer Fund which in 2010 merged with The Edwina Mountbatten Trust, founded in memory of Leonora's great-grandmother. The merged charities were renamed The Edwina Mountbatten and Leonora Children's Foundation on 20 February 2014. She has taken on the running of Broadlands following her husband's diagnosis with Alzheimer's disease.

Since her marriage, Lady Mountbatten has been in close contact with the British royal family. She frequently attends the Royal Windsor Horse Show as a guest of the royal family. She was particularly close to Prince Philip, Duke of Edinburgh from the 1990s when they participated in carriage driving competitions. She was one of only 30 mourners at his funeral on 17 April 2021 at St George's Chapel, Windsor Castle. At her daughter's wedding in 2016, King Charles III, then Prince of Wales, gave the bride away. With her daughter Lady Alexandra Hooper, Lady Mountbatten attended the state funeral of Queen Elizabeth II on 19 September 2022.

== Marriage and children ==
On 20 October 1979 at Romsey Abbey, she married Lord Romsey, son and heir of the 2nd Countess Mountbatten of Burma and the 7th Lord Brabourne. The groom's second cousin, Charles, Prince of Wales (later King Charles III), served as best man. The wedding took place two months after the assassination of her husband's grandfather, the 1st Earl Mountbatten of Burma, by an IRA bomb. The family seat is Broadlands, Hampshire.

Lady Mountbatten and her husband have three children and three grandsons:

- Nicholas Louis Charles Norton Knatchbull, Lord Brabourne (born 15 May 1981), his father's heir apparent; married Ambre Pouzet on 20 May 2021 at Broadlands. They have two children:
  - The Hon. Alexander Knatchbull (born June 2022)
  - The Hon. Endora Luna Marie Knatchbull (born 2025)
- Lady Alexandra Victoria Edwina Diana Hooper (née Knatchbull; born 5 December 1982); a goddaughter of Diana, Princess of Wales. She married Thomas Edward Huntly Hooper on 25 June 2016, at Romsey Abbey. They have two sons:
  - Inigo Norton Sebastian Mountbatten Hooper (born 21 December 2017)
  - Alden Peter Theodore Mountbatten Hooper (born 27 March 2020)
- The Hon. Leonora Louise Marie Elizabeth Knatchbull (25 June 1986 – 22 October 1991). She died of kidney cancer at the age of five years and is buried in the grounds of the family home, Broadlands. The charity Leonora Children's Cancer Fund was founded in her memory.

From her marriage in 1979 until her father-in-law's death in 2005, she was styled as Lady Romsey and from then until her mother-in-law's death in 2017 as The Lady Brabourne.

== In popular culture ==
Lady Mountbatten is portrayed by Natascha McElhone in the fifth season of the Netflix series The Crown. She first appears in episode one of season five and becomes more prominent as the season progresses, becoming a central part of the plot in episode six.
