= Patrick Jephson =

British journalist

- Born: Ireland
- Education: Cambridge University
- Occupation: Journalist
- Spouse: Mary Jo Jacobi

Patrick Jephson is an Irish-born British-American journalist, television presenter, and author who was previously the private secretary and equerry to Diana, Princess of Wales.

== Biography ==
Jephson was born and raised in Ireland. He was awarded an undergraduate degree in political science from Cambridge University.

Jephson served in the British Royal Navy for a decade and was then selected for the Royal Household. Jephson was the private secretary to Diana, Princess of Wales from 1988 to 1996.

In 1995, then BBC television journalist, Martin Bashir, produced what later proved to be forged bank documents in order for Bashir to gain access to the Princess and secure an interview with her. The forged documents purported to show that Jephson was spying on the Princess of Wales. On 22 January 1996, shortly before the story of Tiggy Legge-Bourke's unfounded abortion allegation was published, Jephson resigned, as did his assistant Nicole Cockell the next day. Jephson later wrote that Diana had "exulted in accusing Legge-Bourke of having had an abortion".

In 2022 the BBC apologised and paid compensation to Jephson for the harm done to him by the false allegations made against him by Bashir while Bashir was working for the network. Jephson donated all the compensation to Tŷ Hafan children's hospice in memory of the late princess.

Jephson is the author of Shadows of a Princess: An Intimate Account By Her Private Secretary (Harper 2000).

Jephson subsequently emigrated to the United States, and became a naturalised U.S. citizen in 2015. He resides in Washington, D.C. He is married to Mary Jo Jacobi.

== In popular culture ==
Jephson is played in the 2013 film Diana by Charles Edwards. In season 4 of The Crown, he is portrayed by Tom Turner and in season 5 by Jamie Glover.

Jephson also served as a historical consultant to the aforementioned Netflix series The Crown.
