= Leonora Children's Cancer Fund =

British registered charity

The Leonora Children's Cancer Fund was a British registered charity that was registered on 14 September 1994. It was, until 11 March 2010, registered charity number 1040757, when it was removed from the register following its merger with The Edwina Mountbatten Trust, registered charity number 228166. The merged charities were renamed The Edwina Mountbatten and Leonora Children's Foundation on 20 February 2014. The Edwina Mountbatten Trust was a charity founded in memory of Leonora's great-grandmother. The charity provided specially trained nurses to help look after children with childhood cancer. The charity continues to fund nurses looking after children.

The Fund was established by Lord and Lady Romsey, now the Earl and Countess Mountbatten of Burma, in memory of their daughter Leonora Louise Marie Elizabeth Knatchbull (25 June 1986 – 22 October 1991), who died, aged five, from a kidney tumour at St Bartholomew's Hospital in 1991. She was buried on 26 October 1991 at Romsey Abbey.

The Duke of Edinburgh attended a reception, in aid of the charity, on 3 May 1994.

== See also ==
- Knatchbull
