= Edward Knatchbull =

Edward Knatchbull is the name of:

- Sir Edward Knatchbull, 4th Baronet (c. 1670–1730), British MP for Rochester, Kent 1713–1715 & 1722–1727 and Lostwithiel
- Sir Edward Knatchbull, 7th Baronet (1704–1789), Irish MP for Armagh
- Sir Edward Knatchbull, 8th Baronet (1758–1819), his son, British MP for Kent 1790–1802 & 1806–1819
- Sir Edward Knatchbull, 9th Baronet (1781–1849), his son, British MP for Kent 1819–1831 and East Kent, Paymaster-General
