= Joyce Aylard =

British codebreaker at Eastcote (1925–2022)

Joyce Ethel Aylard
- Born: Joyce Ethel Baker; 1925
- Died: 16 October 2022 (aged 97)
- Education: London School of Economics
- Occupation: Codebreaker
- Known for: Code-breaking work during World War II
- Children: Richard Aylard

Joyce Ethel Aylard (née Baker, 1925 – 16 October 2022) was a British codebreaker at Eastcote, an outstation of Bletchley Park, during World War II.

Aylard was born in 1925, and grew up in Canning Town and Ilford. She was evacuated from London to Ipswich and later Blaengarw, Wales, during Operation Pied Piper in 1939–1940. She joined the Women's Royal Naval Service whose members were known as Wrens, in 1943, and was assigned to work at Eastcote.

At Eastcote, Aylard was one of operators of the Bombe cryptography machine, designed by codebreaker Alan Turing. Her role was to work during one of three shifts of operators (many women) who systematically tested different combinations to attempt to break the code used in the Cryptanalysis of the Enigma. The machines were loud, and may have led to hearing loss in one of her ears. According to the Guardian, the Wrens had a big impact.

When a code was broken, someone senior would come into the room and shout 'job up' ... So you’d stop and try another code. When successful, their codebreaking efforts could have a monumental impact on the war effort. The decoding of one message led to the location of the Scharnhorst, one of Germany’s most famous battleships, being revealed. Allied forces were then able to attack and defeat the ship in the Battle of the North Cape, off Norway.

At the end of World War II in Europe, she was reassigned to continue her code-breaking work on Japanese encrypted messages.

After the war, she studied at the London School of Economics and became an economics teacher at Queen Elizabeth's Girls School, Barnet.

Aylard was the mother of Royal Navy officer Richard Aylard, the former Private Secretary to the Prince of Wales. She was honoured with two medals for her war work. Aylard died on 16 October 2022, at the age of 97.
