= Jamie Glover =

British actor

- Born: Jamie Blair Glover; Barnes, London, England
- Education: Royal Central School of Speech and Drama
- Occupation: Actor
- Years active: 1980–present
- Partner: Sasha Behar
- Children: 2
- Parent(s): Julian Glover; Isla Blair

Jamie Blair Glover is an English actor. He is best known for playing Andrew Treneman in the BBC One school-based drama series Waterloo Road, returning to the role in 2023. He was also cast as Harry Potter in the second cast of the West End production of Harry Potter and the Cursed Child in 2017, and starred as Roger Tramplemain in Michael Frayn's comical farce Noises Off at the Novello Theatre in 2012. He also appeared as William Russell in the Doctor Who docudrama An Adventure in Space and Time (2013).

== Early life and education ==
Jamie Blair Glover was born and brought up in Barnes, London. He is the son of actors Julian Glover and Isla Blair.

He attended Frensham Heights School in Farnham, Surrey, and trained at the Central School of Speech and Drama. During his time at there, Glover met and shared a flat with fellow actor Philip Glenister.

== Career ==
=== Television ===
Glover made his professional debut in the soap opera Jupiter Moon. His other television credits include Birds of a Feather, Casualty, Cadfael, Joseph, New Tricks, Midsomer Murders and Trial & Retribution XV: Rules Of The Game. He played deputy head Andrew Treneman in the first two series of the BBC One school-based drama Waterloo Road, alongside Jason Merrells and Angela Griffin; he briefly reprised the role in the fourth series and returned again in 2023.

In February 2024, Glover was cast as Patrick Onley, the new Clinical Lead of the Emergency Department, in Casualty, with the character making his debut in March 2024. Glover departed the series at the conclusion of the character's storyline in June 2024, in a previously unannounced exit.

=== Theatre and film ===
Glover made his first stage appearance at the age of eight, playing young Marcius in a production of Coriolanus at Stratford. Although other juvenile appearances and film offers followed, his parents kept him from becoming a child actor, preferring that he make the choice about his career when he was ready. His theatre work includes Edward III, Henry V (Propeller), The Chalk Garden, The Glass Menagerie, The Cherry Orchard and All's Well That Ends Well, alongside Judi Dench. He also appeared in Hamlet at the Norwich Playhouse, alongside his parents, with Julian Glover also directing the production.

Glover played Peter in the French comedy What's in a Name? alongside Nigel Harman, Sarah Hadland, Raymond Coulthard and Olivia Poulet at the Birmingham Repertory Theatre in January 2017.

He joined the cast of Harry Potter and the Cursed Child at the Palace Theatre, London starting on 24 May 2017, playing the role of Harry Potter.

Glover has appeared in the films These Foolish Things, The Reef and Closing Numbers.

=== Voice work ===
Glover has lent his voice to documentaries, commercials, audiobooks and computer games. He joined the Star Wars universe in various voice-roles: he played General Maximilian Veers in Star Wars: Battlefront II, taking over the role from his father who played the same character in The Empire Strikes Back. In Battlefront II, he dubbed over archive footage of his father as Veers for the archive footage sequences in the game from Empire Strikes Back. He returned to reprise his role as Veers in Star Wars: Empire at War. He also did voice work in Knights of the Old Republic II, and has a major role in Star Wars: The Old Republic as Darth Malgus.

He also works in radio drama, and considers that: "Radio allows you to do work on a really good piece with a great cast, director and writer but because it takes far less time, it means that you can schedule in other things easily". In 2013, he starred in a BBC Radio adaptation of The Mask of Dimitrios.

=== Directing ===
Glover directed student productions at RADA, and in 2008 made his directorial debut with a production of Measure for Measure for the Ambassador's Theatre Group.

== Personal life ==
Glover has two children with his partner, actress Sasha Behar.

== Filmography ==
=== Television ===
Year	Show	Role	Notes
1980	Play for Today	Mark – Jude (1980)	Anthology series
1987	Vanity Fair	Ens Gray – Struggles and Trials (1987)	Miniseries
1989	Wish Me Luck	Julian – Episode 2.5 (1989)	
1990	Jupiter Moon	Phillipe Gervais	Science fiction soap opera
1990	Birds of a Feather	Richard – Young Guns (1990)	Sitcom
1990	The Tragedy of Flight 103: The Inside Story	New Scanner	Docudrama
1990	Casualty	Luke – Results (1990)	Medical drama
1992	The Young Indiana Jones Chronicles	Graves – Somme, Early August 1916 (1992)	
1992	Second Thoughts	Kevin – Recipe for Disaster (1992) – Affair Assessment (1992) – Occupational Hazard (1992) – Heartburn (1993)	Sitcom
1993	Don't Leave Me This Way	Paul Elvin	Television film
1994	Cadfael	Simon – The Leper of St Giles (1994)	
1995	Joseph	Benjamin	Television film
1997	Plotlands	Ralph Samson	
1997	A Dance to the Music of Time	Robert Tolland – The War (1997)	
1998	Dalziel and Pascoe	Rod Lomas – Child's Play (1998)	Police drama
1998	The Broker's Man	Max Collins – Keyman (1998)	
2000	The Thing About Vince...	Paul – Episode 1.1 (2000) – Episode 1.2 (2000) – Episode 1.3 (2000)	Miniseries
2000	In His Life: The John Lennon Story	Brian Epstein	Television film
2001	Casualty	Pete Binnington – Big Mistake (2001)	Medical drama
2001	Men Only	Robert	Television film
2002	Born and Bred	Cornelius Sibbald – The Inspector Calls (2002)	
2004	New Tricks	Stewart Pimley – Episode 1.4 (2004)	Police drama
2004	Holby City	Rory Jackson – Wants and Needs (2004)	Medical drama
2004	World's Worst Century	Narrator	Documentary
2005	Elizabeth I	Richard	Miniseries
2005	The Dark Side of Porn	Narrator – Death of a Porn Star	Documentary
2006–2007, 2009, 2023–2024	Waterloo Road	Andrew Treneman	Main cast
2006	Midsomer Murders	Jamie Cramner – Last Year's Model	Police drama
2008	Trial & Retribution	Dan Vaughan – Trial & Retribution XV: The Rules of the Game	Police drama
2009	Emma	Henry Knightley	Mini-series
2011	Holby City	Angus Farrell; 13x32, "A Greater Good" (24 May, 1 episode).	Medical drama
2012	Holby City	Angus Farrell; 14x13, "Hide Your Love Away" (10 January, 1 episode)	Medical drama
2013	Father Brown	Dr Michael Evans; 1x7 "The Devil's Dust" (22 January, 1 episode)	Detective series
2013	Endeavour	Dr. Ian Kern	Episode: "Home"
2013	An Adventure in Space and Time	William Russell	Television docudrama
2014–2022	Agatha Raisin	James Lacey	Recurring role
2022	The Crown	Patrick Jephson	Supporting role (Season 5)
2022	Shakespeare and Hathaway	Jonathan Skylark – 4x3, "Too Much of Water"	Detective drama
2024	Casualty	Patrick Onley	Series regular

=== Film ===
Year	Film	Role	Notes
1993	Age of Treason	Domitian	Feature film
1993	Closing Numbers	Pete	Feature film
1998	The Whisper		Short film
1999	The Reef	Owen Leath	Feature film
2006	These Foolish Things	Everard	Feature film
2011	Showreel	Sandy	

=== Video games ===
Year	Production	Role	Notes
2004	Harry Potter and the Prisoner of Azkaban (video game)	Remus Lupin	Computer game
2004	Star Wars: Knights of the Old Republic II – The Sith Lords	Additional voices	Computer game
2005	Star Wars: Battlefront II	General Veers / Imperial Officer 1 / Sadistic Moff	Computer game
2006	Star Wars: Empire at War	Colonel Veers / Additional Voices	Computer game
2009	Dragon Age: Origins	Mad Hermit / Slim Couldry / Additional Voices	Computer game
2010	Dragon Age: Origins – Awakening	The Architect	Computer game
2010	Star Wars: The Force Unleashed II	Imperial Officer	Video game
2011	Dragon Age II	Ser Thrask/ Kelder / Comte Guillaume de Launcet	Computer game
2011	Star Wars: The Old Republic	Darth Malgus	Computer game
2013	Soul Sacrifice	Venetar	Computer game
2014	Assassin's Creed: Unity	Additional voices	Video game
2016	Battlefield I		Video game
2020	Troy: A Total War Saga		Video game
