= Natascha McElhone =

English actress and producer (born 1971)

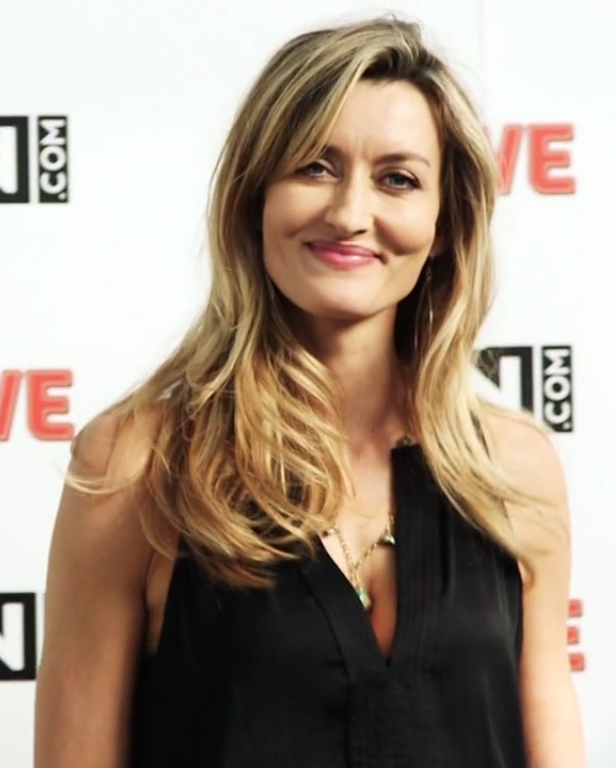
- McElhone at the premier of Believe at the National Football Museum in Manchester in 2014
- Born: Natascha Abigail Taylor; 14 December 1969 (age 56); London, England
- Education: London Academy of Music and Dramatic Art
- Occupation: Actress
- Years active: 1990–present
- Spouse: Martin Hirigoyen Kelly (m. 1998; died 2008)
- Children: 3
- Relatives: Roy Greenslade (stepfather)

Natascha McElhone (/ˈmækəlˌhoʊn/ MACK-əl-HOHN, born Natascha Abigail Taylor , 14 December 1969) is an English actress and producer, who has worked extensively in film and television in both the United Kingdom and the United States. She is known to film audiences for her roles in Surviving Picasso (1996), Ronin (1998), The Truman Show (1998), Kenneth Branagh's Love's Labour's Lost (2000), Solaris (2002) and Carmen (2021).

She is known to television audiences for her roles as Karen on Californication (2007–14), First Lady Alex Kirkman on Designated Survivor (2016–17), Penelope Knatchbull, Lady Romsey on The Crown (2022), Dr. Catherine Halsey on Halo (2022–24) and Cordelia Holmes in Young Sherlock (2026–present). She was the voice of Marie Belmont in the video game Castlevania: Lords of Shadow (2010) and its sequel Castlevania: Lords of Shadow 2 (2014).

McElhone is a Satellite Award, Saturn Award, and an Irish Film & Television Award nominee.

== Early life ==
McElhone was born Natascha Abigail Taylor, on 14 December 1971 in London, England, to Irish mother Noreen McElhone, and English father Michael Taylor, both journalists. Her parents separated when she was two. Her mother moved the family to Brighton, and later married journalist and columnist Roy Greenslade. McElhone has a brother, Damon (by Taylor), and two half-brothers, Nicholas and Alex (by Taylor).

She studied acting at the London Academy of Music and Dramatic Art.

== Career ==
While eventually taking McElhone, her mother's maiden name, as her stage name, she began her career, in the theatre, as "Natascha Taylor", work that included starring roles in Richard III and A Midsummer Night's Dream at the Open Air Theatre, Regent's Park, London, and in The Count of Monte Cristo and The Cherry Orchard at the Haymarket Theatre, Leicester. She made her television debut in 1990, again credited as "Natascha Taylor", in Television South's adaptation of the Inspector Wexford story An Unkindness of Ravens.

She appeared the following year, again as "Natascha Taylor," in the series Bergerac as Louise Calder, a rebellious daughter of very wealthy parents. She appeared in two episodes of the Dennis Potter television miniseries Karaoke.

McElhone's first major box-office role, and an early role where she was credited as her new stage name, came with Surviving Picasso (1996), with co-star Anthony Hopkins. One of her most successful films to date has been The Truman Show (1998) with Jim Carrey. She had leading roles opposite Brad Pitt in The Devil's Own (1997), Robert De Niro in Ronin (1998) and George Clooney in Solaris (2002).

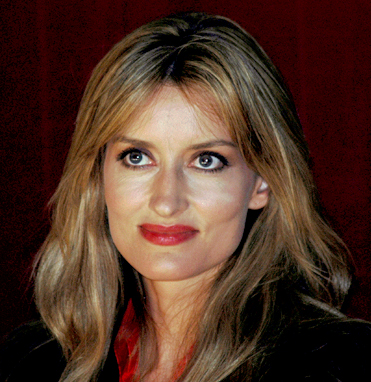
McElhone in 2009

Co-starring with Bill Pullman, she appeared in the NBC miniseries Revelations (2005). McElhone starred in a 2006 West End production of Honour at the Wyndham's Theatre alongside Diana Rigg and Martin Jarvis. She accepted the role as Karen in the Showtime cable television series Californication, alongside David Duchovny. In 2009, she became a spokeswoman for Neutrogena. In 2010, McElhone voiced Marie in the video game Castlevania: Lords of Shadow from Konami.

She featured as Lady Capulet in Romeo and Juliet (2013), a film adaptation of Shakespeare's play. Douglas Booth and Hailee Steinfeld were the leads, and Damian Lewis played her husband. In 2014, McElhone played Alex Forrest in Fatal Attraction at the Theatre Royal Haymarket. In 2015, she starred as Sarah Churchill in the Royal Shakespeare Company's production of Helen Edmundson's Queen Anne.

In February 2016, McElhone was cast alongside Kiefer Sutherland in ABC's political drama series Designated Survivor, which premiered in September 2016. She left the show in Season 2 to star as Laz Ingram in the Hulu science fiction drama series The First (2018).

In 2022, McElhone appeared as Prince Philip, Duke of Edinburgh's close friend Penelope Knatchbull in the Netflix historical series season 5 of The Crown.

From 2022 to 2024, she starred as Catherine Halsey in the Paramount+ military science fiction series Halo.

McElhone has narrated several audiobooks (alone, or in collaboration with other narrators) including Figuring by Maria Popova, Picasso by Arianna Huffington, Amok by Sebastian Fitzek, and several children's stories by Matt Haig.

== Personal life ==
McElhone married plastic surgeon Martin Hirigoyen Kelly on 19 May 1998. The couple lived in Fulham, south-west London. They had three sons, the third born five months after Kelly's death.

On 20 May 2008, 43-year-old Kelly was found slumped in the doorway of his family's home by a fellow doctor, who had him rushed to Chelsea and Westminster Hospital. He could not be revived and died one day after his 10th wedding anniversary. A postmortem exam revealed the cause of death to have been dilated cardiomyopathy.

After her husband's death, McElhone continued to write letters to him, sometimes documenting the daily trivia of life but also dealing with how she and their young children were coping with their loss. These letters and diary entries formed the basis of her book After You: Letters of Love, and Loss, to a Husband and Father, published in July 2010.

== Filmography ==
List of film works
Year	Title	Role	Notes	Ref.
1996	Surviving Picasso	Françoise Gilot		
1997	The Devil's Own	Megan Doherty		
1997	Mrs Dalloway	Young Clarissa Dalloway		
1998	The Truman Show	Lauren Garland / Sylvia		
1998	What Rats Won't Do	Kate Beckenham		
1998	Ronin	Deirdre		
2000	Love's Labour's Lost	Lady Rosaline		
2000	Contaminated Man	Holly Anderson		
2002	Laurel Canyon	Sara		
2002	FeardotCom	Terry Huston		
2002	Killing Me Softly	Deborah Tallis		
2002	City of Ghosts	Sophie		
2002	Solaris	Rheya Kelvin		
2004	Ladies in Lavender	Olga Daniloff		
2005	Guy X	SFC Irene Teal		
2006	Big Nothing	Penelope Wood		
2008	The Secret of Moonacre	Loveday de Noir		
2008	Blessed	Lou		
2010	The Kid	Gloria		
2013	The Sea	Connie Grace		
2013	Believe	Erica Gallagher		
2013	Romeo and Juliet	Lady Capulet		
2016	Mr. Church	Marie Brooks		
2016	London Town	Sandrine Baker		
2021	Carmen	Carmen		

List of television works
Year	Title	Role	Notes	Ref.
1990	The Ruth Rendell Mysteries	Helen Blake	Episodes: "An Unkindness of Ravens: Parts 1 & 2"	
1991	Bergerac	Louise Calder	Episode: "Snow in Provence"	
1994	Absolutely Fabulous	Art Gallery Assistant	Episode: "Death"	
1994	Minder	Vanessa	Episode: "All Quiet on the West End Front"	
1994	Cadfael	Cecily Corde	Episode: "The Sanctuary Sparrow"	
1994	Screen One	Janet	Episode: "A Breed of Heroes"	
1996	Karaoke	Angie	Episodes: "Tuesday" & "Friday"	
1996	Cold Lazarus	Angie	Miniseries; 2 episodes	
2003	The Other Boleyn Girl	Mary Boleyn	Television film	
2005	Revelations	Sister Josepha Montafiore	Miniseries; 6 episodes	
2007	The Company	Elizabet Nemeth	Miniseries; 2 episodes	
2007–2014	Californication	Karen Van Der Beek	Main role; 80 episodes	
2009	10 Minute Tales	Woman	Episode: "Deep & Crisp & Even"	
2010	Thorne: Sleepyhead	Anne Coburn	Miniseries; 3 episodes	
2015	Saints & Strangers	Elizabeth Hopkins	Miniseries; 2 episodes	
2016–2017	Designated Survivor	First Lady Alexandra Jane "Alex" Kirkman	Main role (seasons 1–2); 27 episodes	
2018	The First	Laz Ingram	Main role; 8 episodes	
2022	The Crown	Penelope Knatchbull, Lady Romsey	Main role; 3 episodes (Season 5)	
2022	Better Things	Mark's girlfriend (uncredited)	Episode: "England"	
2022–2024	Halo	Dr. Catherine Elizabeth Halsey	Main role; 16 episodes (also producer for season 2)	
2022–2024	Hotel Portofino	Isabella "Bella" Ainsworth	Main role; 18 episodes	
2025	The Kollective	Maya Blade	Main role; 6 episodes	
2026–present	Young Sherlock	Cordelia Holmes	Main role; 8 episodes	

List of video game appearances
Year	Title	Role	Notes	Ref.
2010	Castlevania: Lords of Shadow	Marie Belmont		
2014	Castlevania: Lords of Shadow 2	Marie Belmont		

== Awards ==
Awards and nominations
Year	Nominated work	Award	Category	Result
1999	Ronin	MTV Movie Award	Best Action Sequence (shared with Robert De Niro)	Nominated
2003	Solaris	Saturn Award	Best Actress	Nominated
2003	Solaris	IFTA Award	Best Actress in Film	Nominated
2005	Revelations	Satellite Award	Outstanding Actress in a Miniseries or a Motion Picture Made for Television	Nominated
2010	The Kid	Irina Palm	Worst British Supporting Actress	Won
2022	Halo	WIN Award	Actress Drama Series	Nominated
