= Hasnat Khan =

British-Pakistani heart-lung surgeon (born 1958)

Hasnat Khan FRCS
- Born: Hasnat Ahmed Khan; 1 April 1958 (age 68); Jhelum, Punjab, Pakistan
- Education: King Edward Medical University (MBBS); Imperial College London (PhD)
- Occupations: Heart and lung surgeon
- Spouses: Hadia Sher Ali (m. 2006; div. 2008); Somi Sohail (m. 2017)

Hasnat Ahmed Khan FRCS (Urdu: حسنات احمد خان; born 1 April 1958) is a British-Pakistani heart and lung surgeon. He is widely known for his romantic relationship with Diana, Princess of Wales, from 1995 to 1997.

== Early life and education ==
Khan was born on 1 April 1958 in Jhelum, a city in the Punjab province of Pakistan to a Pashtun family. He is the eldest of four children. His father, Rashid Khan, a graduate of the London School of Economics, ran a glass factory. Hasnat Khan is a distant cousin of Imran Khan, former prime minister of Pakistan.

Khan graduated from King Edward Medical University in 1984 with an MBBS degree. Then he undertook training in general medicine and general surgery before being promoted to a medical officer in cardiology at Mayo Hospital, Lahore, Pakistan.

He received a PhD from Imperial College London and fellowship from the Royal College of Surgeons of Edinburgh.

== Career ==
Khan relocated to Sydney in 1987 after he was selected by the Australian Medical Council for a position as a house officer in adult cardiac surgery. A year later he was promoted to a fellow position.

Until 1991 he worked in Sydney, Australia, and then began to work in London. In 1994, he began his first registrar job in adult cardiac surgery at Leeds General Infirmary. He served at the Royal Brompton Hospital in London from 1995 to 1996, then he began to work at the London Chest Hospital.

In 2000, he worked at St Bartholomew's Hospital, after which he served at Harefield Hospital. In November 2007, he resigned from the post and began to head a cardiac hospital in Malaysia. As of August 2013, Khan was working as a consultant cardiothoracic surgeon at Basildon University Hospital.

== Personal life ==
=== Relationship with the Princess of Wales ===
Khan had a two-year relationship with Diana, Princess of Wales, who is said to have described him as "Mr Wonderful." In May 1996, Diana visited the Khan family in Lahore. Diana's butler Paul Burrell said in testimony at her 2008 inquest that Diana described Khan as her soulmate. Diana ended the relationship in July 1997.

Diana's friends are reported to have described Hasnat as the "love of her life" and to have spoken of her distress when she ended their relationship. He, however, is said to be reticent about speaking of how much he may have meant to her or even how much she meant to him. Khan attended Diana's funeral ceremony at Westminster Abbey in September 1997.

Khan told the police in 2004 that he doubted she had been pregnant when she died because she always took her contraceptive pills. In March 2008, he said in a written statement to Lord Justice Scott Baker's inquest into Diana's death that their relationship had begun in the late summer of 1995, and that although they had talked about getting married he believed that he would find the inevitable media attention "hell." Khan also said he believed the car crash which caused Diana's death was a tragic accident.

=== Marriage ===
Khan married 28-year-old Hadia Sher Ali in Pakistan, descended from Afghan royalty, in May 2006. In July 2008, Khan and Ali filed an application for divorce in the local arbitration council of Islamabad. He was later linked to Dr Alexandra Panagoulas, a fellow heart surgeon, then married Somi Sohail, referred to as "Somi Khan".

== In the media ==
The relationship between Khan and Diana, Princess of Wales is portrayed in the film Diana (2013), directed by Oliver Hirschbiegel and based on Kate Snell's book Diana: Her Last Love (2001). Khan is played by Naveen Andrews, while Diana is played by Naomi Watts.

Khan was portrayed by Pakistani actor Humayun Saeed in the fifth season of The Crown.
