= Richard Cordery =

British actor

- Occupation: Actor
- Years active: 1978–present

Richard Cordery is a British actor.

== Career ==
=== Film and television ===
Cordery's television credits include Rumpole of the Bailey, as a prosecution Barrister (Series 5 Episode 6 - 1988), Doc Martin as Dennis Dodds, Whitechapel as George Collier, Garrow's Law as Sir Sampson Wright. He appeared in Midsomer Murders “The Straw Woman” as Dr John Cole in 2004, as Morris Bingham in “The-Made-to Measure Murders” in 2010, and as Atticus Bradley in “The Killings of Copenhagen“ (2014, S16:E5). He played the Duc De Raguse in the 2012 film Les Misérables.

In the 2013 film About Time, Cordery played Uncle Desmond, the "sweet but mentally-challenged" uncle of the protagonist Tim.

In the fifth season of The Crown, Cordery portrayed Marmaduke Hussey, the Chairman of the Board of Governors of the BBC from 1986 to 1996.

=== Theatre ===
Much of Cordery's acting career has been in theatre. His body of work includes many Shakespeare performances, such as the tragedy Romeo and Juliet (1997), the trilogy Henry VI (2000), the drama Richard III (2001), the tragedy Macbeth (2004), and the comedy The Winter's Tale. In 2002, Cordery played Menenius in a Swan Theatre adaptation of the Shakespeare play Coriolanus. Later that year, he appeared as Falstaff in another Shakespeare play, The Merry Wives of Windsor. Cordery portrayed the steward Malvolio in a 2005 production of Twelfth Night at the Royal Shakespeare Theatre.

In 2008, he played Russell Blackborough in the play Waste at the Almeida Theater and the following year he appeared in the musical Spring Awakening at the Lyric Theatre. Cordery appeared as Canon Chasuble in a 2011 production of The Importance of Being Earnest at the Rose Theatre, Kingston. The Daily Telegraph praised the actor for giving a "performance of comic bliss as the amorous and sententious Canon Chasuble, baffled by each new turn of events while supporting his prodigious bulk on a surprisingly nifty pair of pins."

== Personal life ==
Cordery is a former teacher who once taught in an inner-London secondary school.

== Filmography ==
Year	Title	Role	Notes
1971	Up Pompeii	Centurian	Uncredited
1992	Lorenzo's Oil	Suddaby's Senior Manager	
2004	Midsomer Murders	Dr. John Cole	
2009	Glorious 39	Vet	
2012	Les Misérables	Duc De Raguse	
2013	About Time	Uncle Desmond	
2014	Mr. Turner	Dinner Guest	
2014	Madame Bovary	Abbé Bournisien	
2014	Breaking the Bank	Bournville	
2015	Social Suicide	Laurence Emerson	
2015	Esio Trot (film)	Mr. Pringle	
2016	Monochrome	John Hughes	
2016	Mum's List	Bob	
2017	Dragonheart: Battle for the Heartfire	Earl Robert	
2017	The Wife	Hal Bowman	
2019	Judy	Louis B. Mayer	
2022	The Crown	Marmaduke Hussey	
