= Norton Knatchbull =

Norton Knatchbull is the name of:

- Sir Norton Knatchbull (MP for Hythe) (1569–1636), MP for Hythe, 1609
- Sir Norton Knatchbull, 1st Baronet (1602–1685), English MP for Kent and New Romney
- Norton Knatchbull, 6th Baron Brabourne (1922–1943), British peer and soldier
- Norton Knatchbull, 3rd Earl Mountbatten of Burma (born 1947), British peer

== See also ==
- The Norton Knatchbull School, English secondary school in Kent
