= Richard Aylard =

Royal Navy officer; Equerry to Prince Charles; Director, Thames Water

- Born: 10 April 1952 (age 74); St Pancras, London
- Relatives: Joyce Aylard (mother)
- Military career
- Allegiance: United Kingdom
- Branch: Royal Navy
- Service years: 1972–89
- Rank: Commander
- Conflicts: Falklands War
- Awards: Commander of the Royal Victorian Order
- Other work: Private Secretary to the Prince of Wales (1991–96)

Commander Richard J. Aylard, CVO (born 10 April 1952) is a retired British Royal Navy officer and is a Director and Special Advisor to the Chief Executive of Thames Water. From 1991 to 1996 he was Private Secretary to the Prince of Wales.

== Education ==
Richard Aylard was born on 10 April 1952 in St Pancras, London, and educated at Queen Elizabeth Grammar School, Barnet. His mother, Joyce Aylard, had been a Wren and codebreaker during World War II. His father, John Aylard, was an officer in the RNVR, serving on the PQ convoys to Russia. Richard studied at the University of Reading, graduating with a BSc(Hons) in Applied Zoology with Mathematics, and at the Britannia Royal Naval College, Dartmouth. He is an Honorary Fellow of the Chartered Institution of Water and Environmental Management.

== Royal Navy ==
Aylard joined the Supply and Secretariat Branch of the Royal Navy in 1972. He served on HMS Shavington, HMS Ark Royal and HMS Fox between 1974 and 1977, being promoted to lieutenant on 16 November 1975. From 1977 to 1979 he was on the staff of FOSM, and 1979–81 was Flag Lieutenant to Deputy Supreme Allied Commander Atlantic.

He was Captain's Secretary on HMS Invincible 1981–83, when he received the South Atlantic Medal for service during the Falklands War. He was promoted to lieutenant commander on 16 November 1983 and between 1984 and 1985, was Supply Officer on HMS Brazen, where he served alongside Prince Andrew. In November 1985 he was appointed Equerry to Diana, Princess of Wales, an office he held until 1988. He became a commander on 30 June 1987 and from 31 May to 30 September 1988, was temporary Assistant Private Secretary to the Princess.

== Royal household ==
Aylard left the Royal Navy in July 1989, and from May 1989 to 1991, was Assistant Private Secretary and Comptroller to the Prince and Princess of Wales. From May 1991 until his retirement in 1996, he was Private Secretary and Treasurer to the Prince of Wales. He remains an Extra Equerry to Charles III (previously the Prince of Wales). He was made a Commander of the Royal Victorian Order in 1994.

== Subsequent career ==
From 1996 to 2002, Aylard was a consultant on environmental issues and public affairs at Burson-Marsteller. In 2002, he joined Thames Water as Corporate Responsibility Director, became their External Affairs and Sustainability Director is now a Director and Special Advisor to the Chief Executive.

Aylard is a Senior Associate of the Cambridge Programme for Sustainability Leadership, an Ambassador for WWF-UK and an Associate of Forum for the Future.

== In popular culture ==
Aylard was portrayed by Alastair Mackenzie in season 5 of the Netflix TV series The Crown, and by Andrew Havill in the 2026 Channel 4 TV drama Dirty Business, about illegal sewage releases by water companies.

== Footnotes ==
Court offices
Preceded by Sir Christopher Airy	Private Secretary to the Prince of Wales; 1991–1996	Succeeded by Sir Stephen Lamport
