= Kelly Fisher (model) =

American fashion model

- Born: Kelly Ann Fisher; 3 February 1967 (age 59); Jefferson, Kentucky
- Occupations: Model; property developer
- Years active: 1986–present
- Children: 1
- Modeling information
- Height: 1.77 m (5 ft 9 1/2 in)
- Hair color: Brown
- Eye color: Hazel
- Agency: Martine's Women Agency in Paris, France; Okay Models in Hamburg, Germany

Kelly Movshina (born 3 February 1967) previously known as Kelly Ann Fisher, is an American property developer and model. Throughout her modeling career, she appeared in advertisement campaigns for fashion brands including Calvin Klein, Victoria's Secret, Armani, and La Perla. She was featured on the covers of Vogue, Marie Claire, Cosmopolitan, W and Elle.

Fisher was known for her relationship with Egyptian film producer Dodi Fayed, who died in a car crash in Paris in 1997 that also caused the death of Diana, Princess of Wales. At the time of Fayed's death, Fisher was suing him for breaking off their reported engagement to pursue a relationship with the princess.

== Early life ==
Fisher was born in Jefferson, Kentucky on 3 February 1967 to mother Judith Ross. In 1977, her mother married David Dunaway, an executive for Kentucky Fried Chicken. As a result of her step-father's job, she moved to Chicago, Illinois and later Toronto, Canada where Fisher was scouted as a model.

== Modeling career ==
Fisher began modeling while she was a teenager. She was featured on the covers of fashion magazines including Elle, Marie Claire, Vogue, Cosmopolitan, and W. Fisher also modeled for Armani, La Perla, Calvin Klein, and Victoria's Secret.

== Personal life ==
=== Relationship with Dodi Fayed ===
In July 1996, Fisher met Egyptian heir and film producer Dodi Fayed. In July 1997, while Fayed was in a relationship with Fisher, he became romantically involved with Diana, Princess of Wales. Fisher only learned of their relationship after seeing paparazzi photos of the two embracing. In August 1997, Fisher, represented by Gloria Allred, sued Fayed for breach of contract in the Santa Monica Superior Court and claimed that they were engaged to be married, with a wedding set for August 9, 1997, when he began a relationship with the princess. A spokesperson for the Al Fayed family denied an engagement between Fisher and Fayed.

Fisher withdrew her lawsuit on September 1, 1997, the day after Fayed and Diana died following a car crash. Fisher participated in the inquest into the death of Diana.

According to journalist Martyn Gregory's 2004 book Diana: The Last Days, Fisher and Fayed became engaged in February 1997 and were gifted a mansion in Malibu, California, from Fayed's father, billionaire Mohamed Al-Fayed. Fisher reportedly picked out antique furniture for the home from the Al-Fayed family home in Paris, Villa Windsor, which had previously been occupied by Prince Edward, Duke of Windsor, and Wallis Simpson.

=== Later life ===
In 2007, Fisher married Russian pilot Mikhail Movshin, whom she met in the Central African Republic. They have one daughter and live in Aiken, South Carolina. They previously lived in Paris and Switzerland.

Upon moving back to the United States, Fisher began working as a property developer in South Carolina.

== In popular culture ==
Fisher was portrayed by Welsh actress Erin Richards in the fifth and sixth seasons of the historical drama television series The Crown.
